= Shiokara =

Japanese snack made of salty seafood

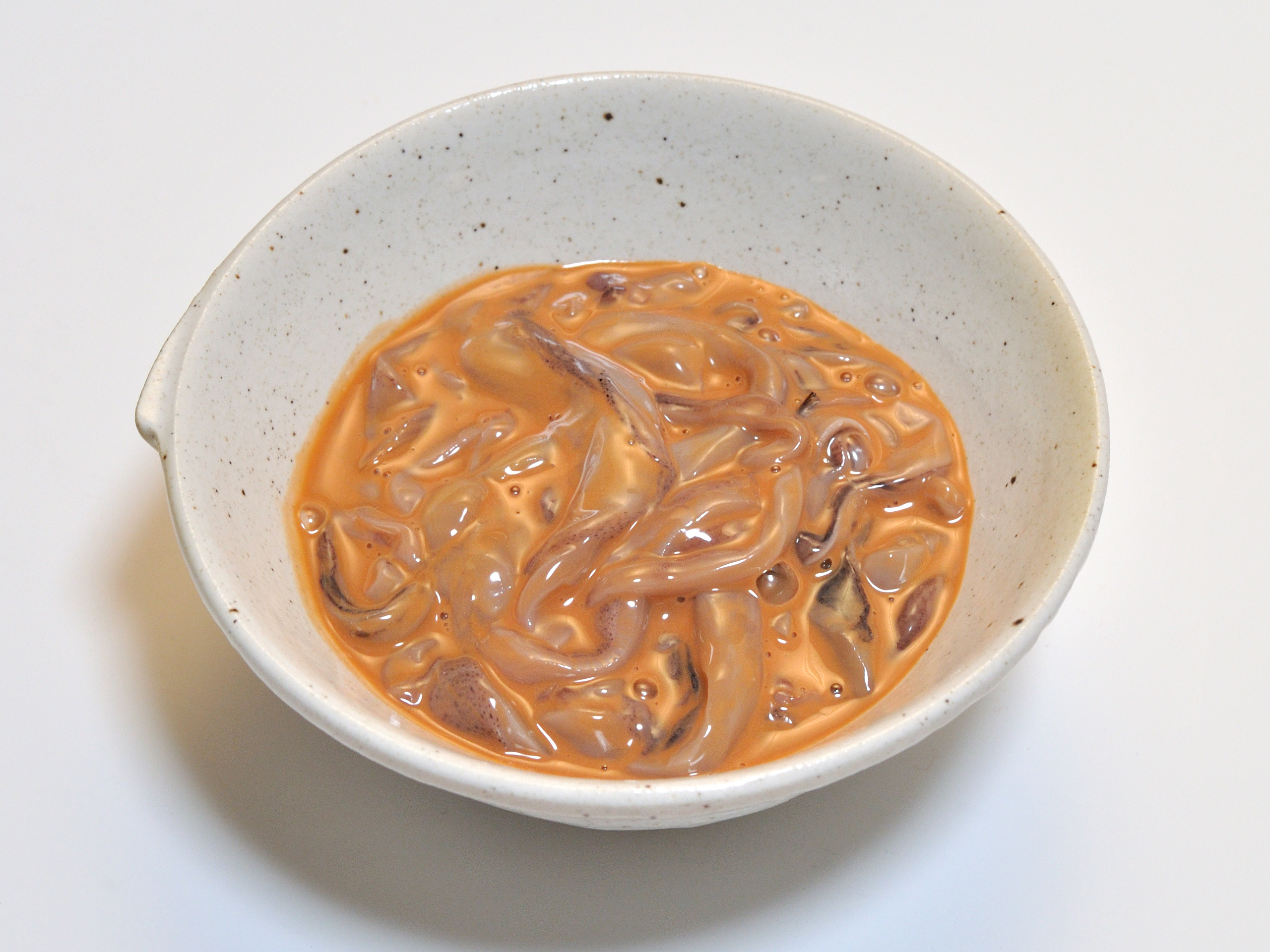
Ika no shiokara

Shiokara (塩辛) lit. 'salty-spicy', is a food in Japanese cuisine made from various marine animals that consists of small pieces of meat in a brown viscous paste of the animal's heavily salted, fermented viscera.

The raw viscera are mixed with about 10% salt, 30% malted rice, packed in a closed container, and fermented for up to a month. Shiokara is sold in glass or plastic containers.

The flavor is similar in saltiness and fishiness to that of European cured anchovies, but with a different texture. One of the best-known chinmi ("delicacy"), it is quite strong and is considered something of an acquired taste even for the native Japanese palate.

It was a valuable protein in post-war Japan because food was scarce and it did not require refrigeration. It continued to be eaten as a condiment for rice and in bars.

One method of enjoying it is to consume the serving in one gulp and to follow it with a shot of straight whisky. Some bars in Japan specialize in shiokara.

== Some types of shiokara ==
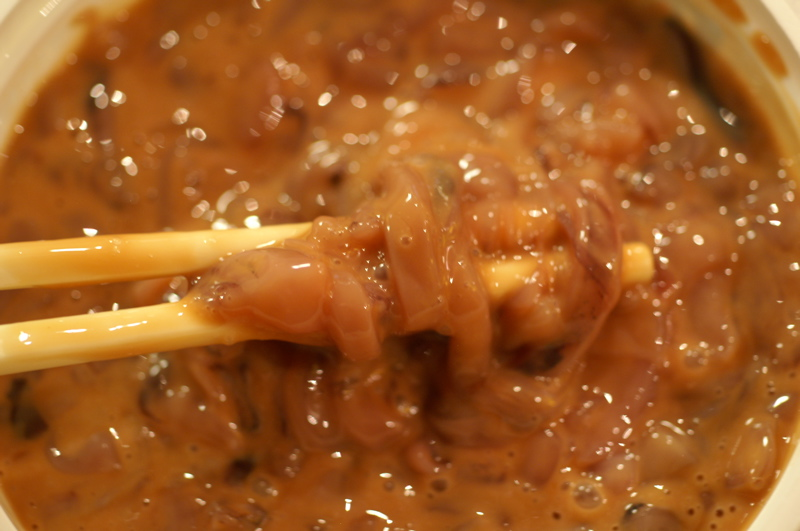
Ika no shiokara with chopsticks

- Ika no shiokara—from cuttlefish "squid", the most common variety
- Hotaruika no shiokara—from firefly squid
- Katsuo no shiokara—from skipjack tuna
- Kaki no shiokara—from oyster
- Uni no shiokara—from sea urchin roe
- Ami no shiokara—from Mysidacea, a krill-like crustacean

Some shiokara types have special names:

- ganzuke — from fiddler crab
- konowata — from sea cucumber
- mefun — from chum salmon
- uruka (shiokara) — from ayu
- shuto — from skipjack tuna (katsuo)

== See also ==
- Dayok, a similar Filipino preparation
- Bekasang, a similar Indonesian preparation
- Anchovies as food
- Jeotgal
- Natto
