= Chinmi =

Japanese term referring to rare food delicacies

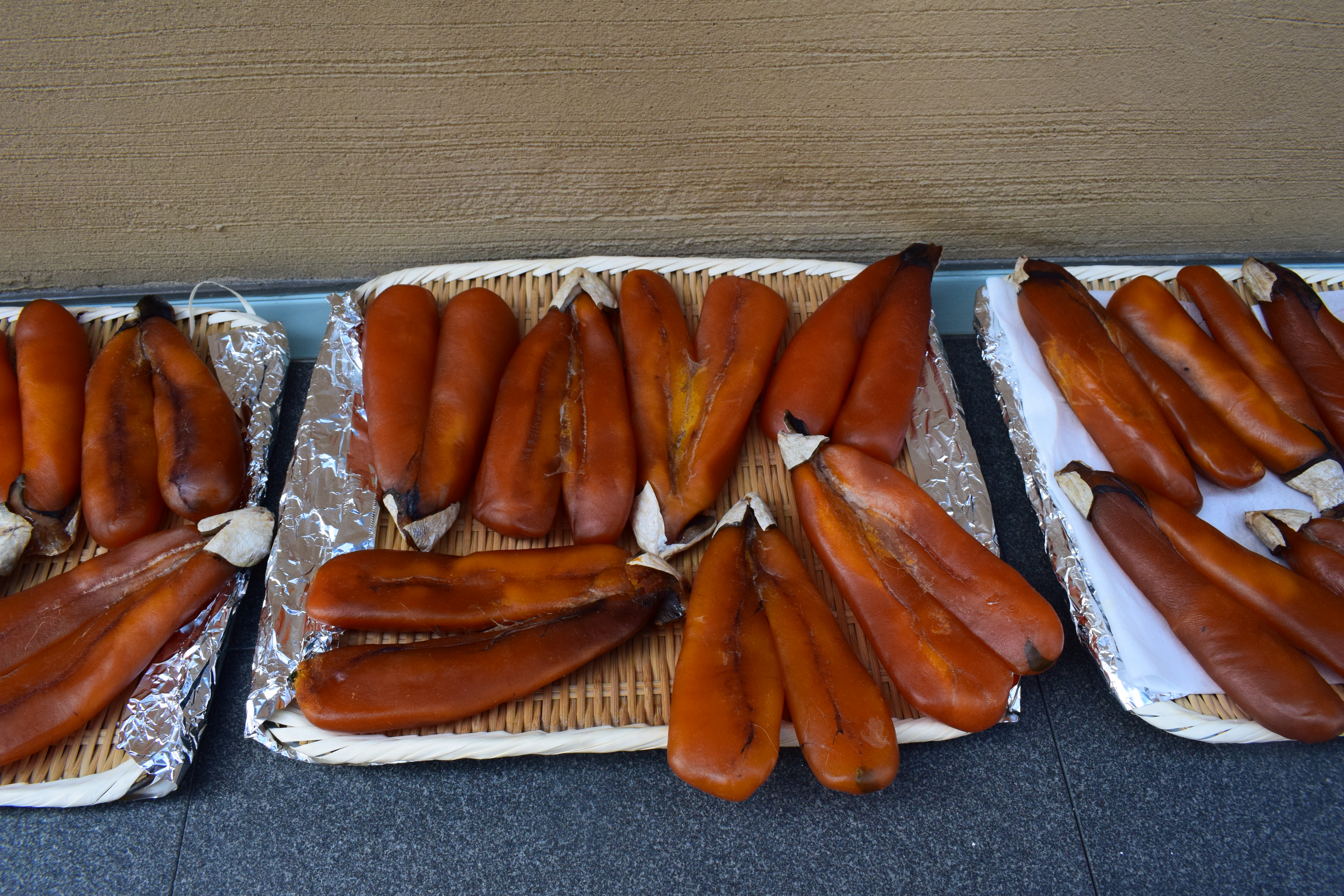
Chinmi: Salt-pickled mullet roe (karasumi)

Chinmi (珍味) is a Japanese term meaning literally "rare taste", but more appropriately "delicacy". They are local cuisines that have fallen out of popularity or that are peculiar to a certain area. Many involve pickled seafood.

== List of chinmi ==
=== Hokkaidō area ===
- Hizunamasu
- Ikanankotsu – Cooked soft bones of squid
- Kankai – Dried komai fish. It may be eaten as is, or broiled and eaten with a sauce made by mixing mayonnaise and soy sauce and sprinkles of red pepper powder.
- Kirikomi
- Matsumaezuke
- Mefun
- Saketoba – A smoked salmon
- Tachikama
- Uni

=== Tōhoku area ===
- Awabi no kimo – Ground internal organs of abalone
- Donpiko – The heart of a salmon. As only one can be taken from a fish, it is very rare.
- Hoya – sea pineapple
- Momijizuke – Shreds of fresh salmon and ikura pickled together
- Tonburi – A speciality of Akita prefecture; the dried seeds of the hosagi plant.

=== Kanto area ===
- Ankimo – Either fresh or steamed liver of an Anko fish
- Kusaya – Dried and pickled fish of Izu islands

=== Chūbu area ===
- Fugu no ranso no nukazuke – detoxified blowfish ovary in rice bran
- Hebo
- Ika no maruboshi
- Inago no tsukudani
- Konowata
- Kuchiko
- Kurozukuri
- Zazamushi

=== Kinki area ===
- Daitokuji natto
- Funazushi
- Kinzanji miso

=== Chūgoku area ===
- Hiroshimana

=== Shikoku area ===
- Chorogi
- Katsuo no heso
- Shuto
- Dorome

=== Kyūshū area ===
- Ganzuke (Saga)
- Karashi mentaiko (Fukuoka)
- Karashi renkon (Kumamoto)
- Karasumi (Nagasaki)
- Okyuto (Fukuoka)

=== Okinawa area ===
- Tofuyo
- Umibudo – A type of edible seaweed with tiny seeds that hang from its stems

== See also ==
- Acquired taste
