= Delicacy =

Food item considered highly desirable in certain cultures

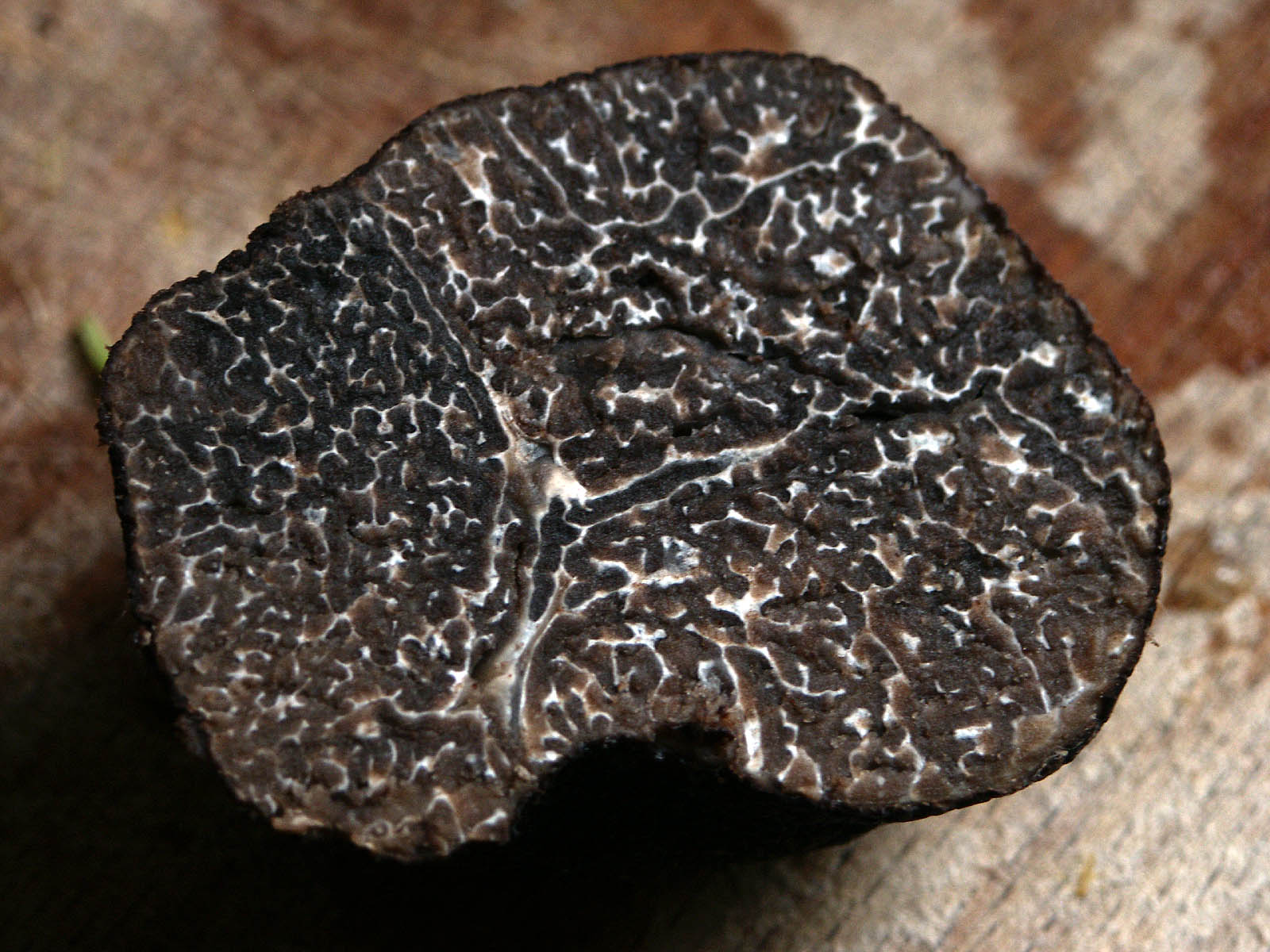
A black Périgord truffle

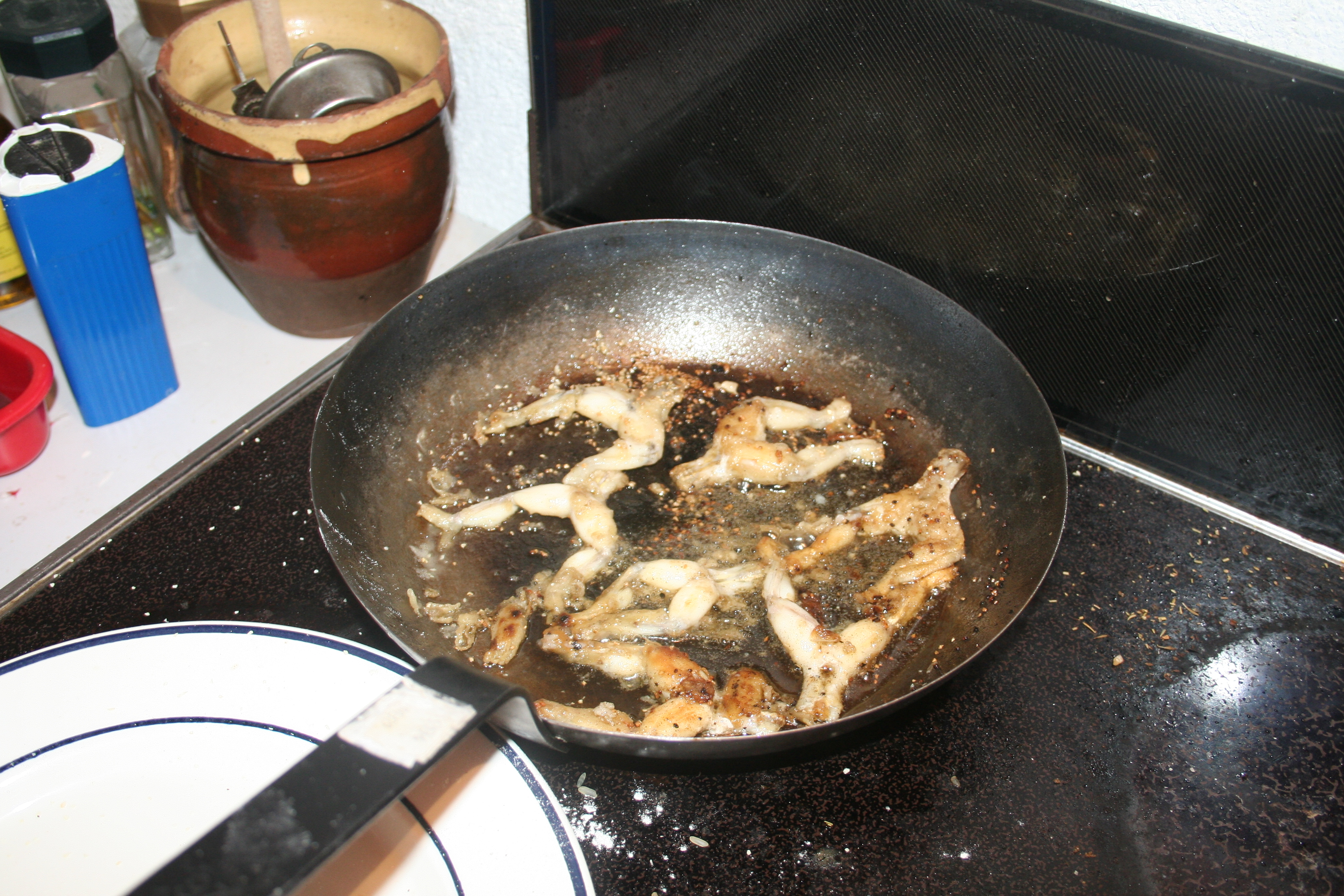
Frog legs, a well-known French delicacy, frying in a pan in France

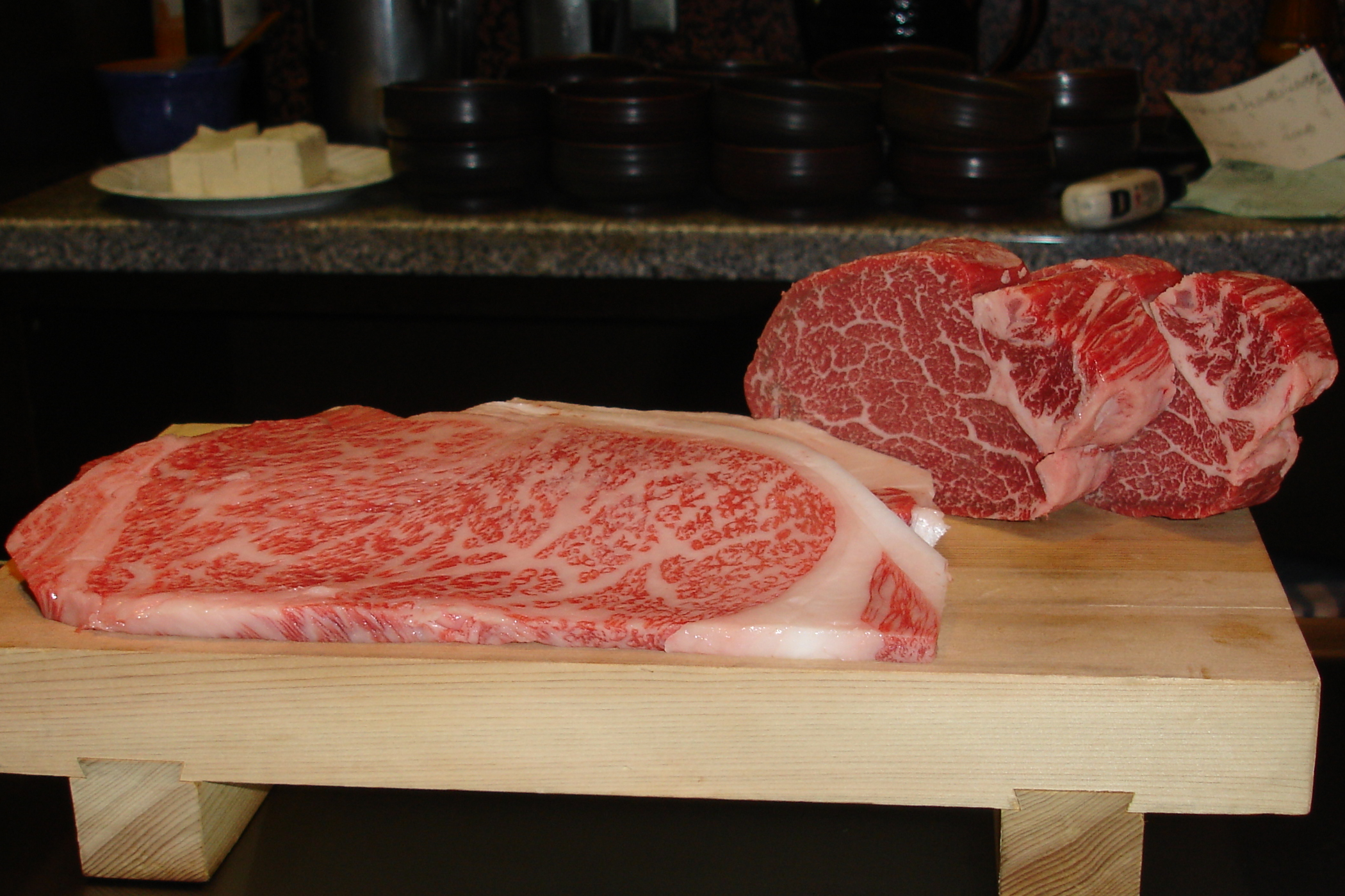
Kobe beef

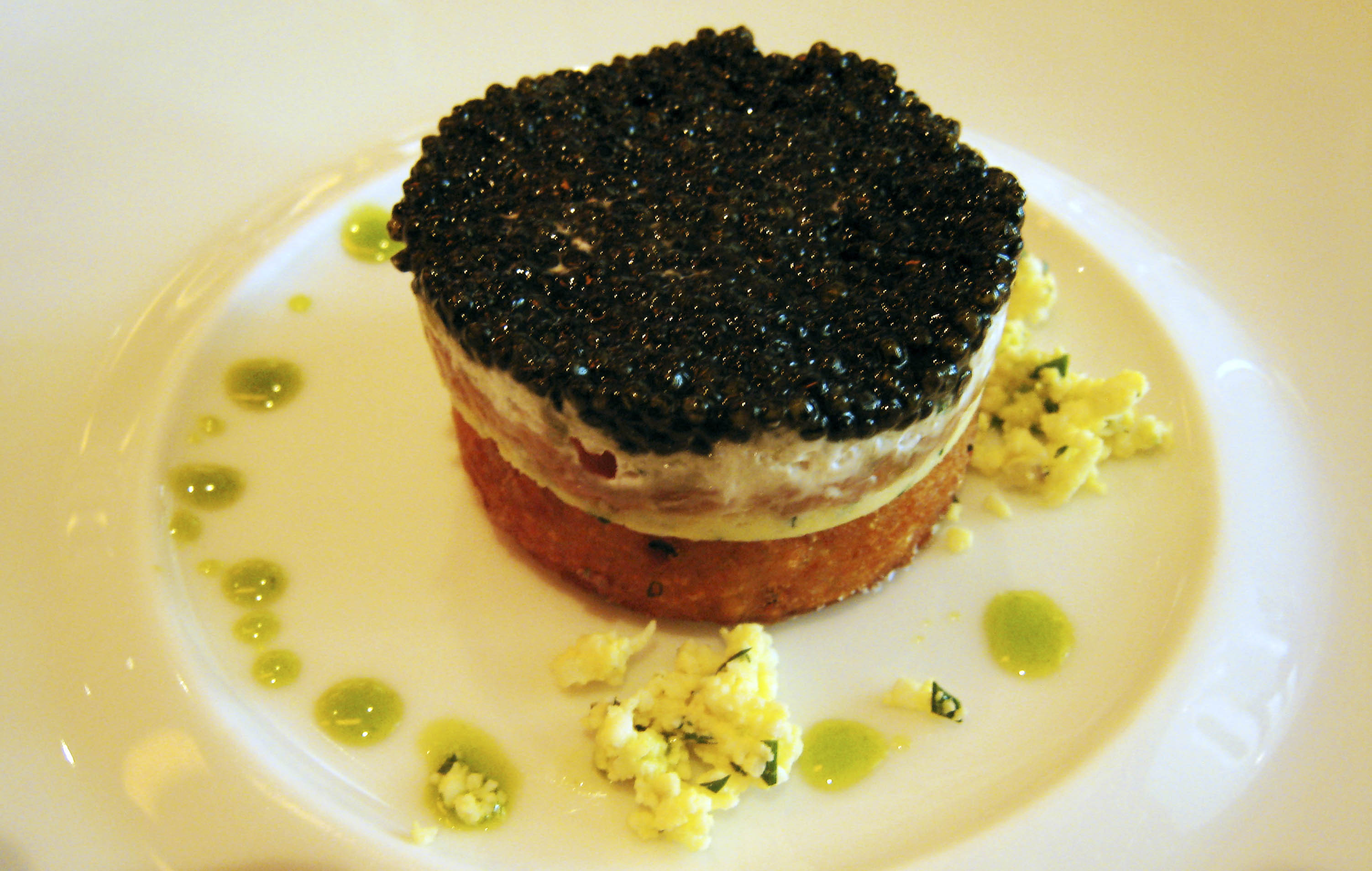
Wild Iranian Ossetra caviar

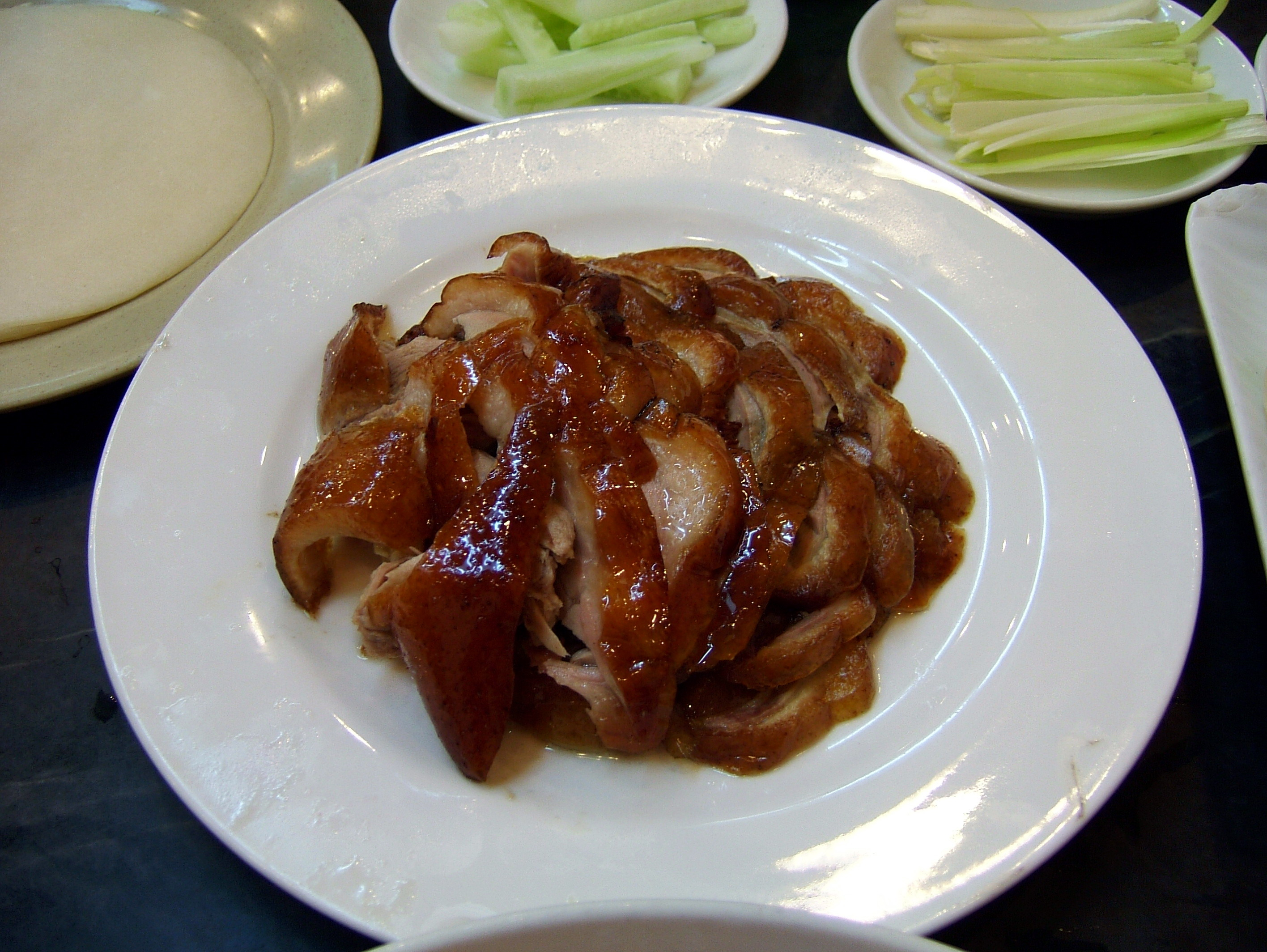
Peking duck

A delicacy is a rare food item that is considered highly desirable, sophisticated, or peculiarly distinctive within a given culture or region. A delicacy may have an unusual flavor or be expensive compared to everyday foods.

Delicacies vary across countries, customs, and ages. Some delicacies are confined to a certain culture, such as fugu in Japan and ant larvae (escamoles) in Mexico, or may refer to specific local products, such as porcino, venison or anchovy.

Culture plays a role in determining what is considered a delicacy. The long-standing tradition and practice of insect consumption represented in Oaxaca, Mexico has occurred for centuries. The availability of foods or particular ingredients may determine the types of delicacies associated with different cultures.

== See also ==
- Acquired taste
- Chinmi
- Delicatessen
- Specialty foods
