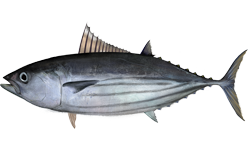

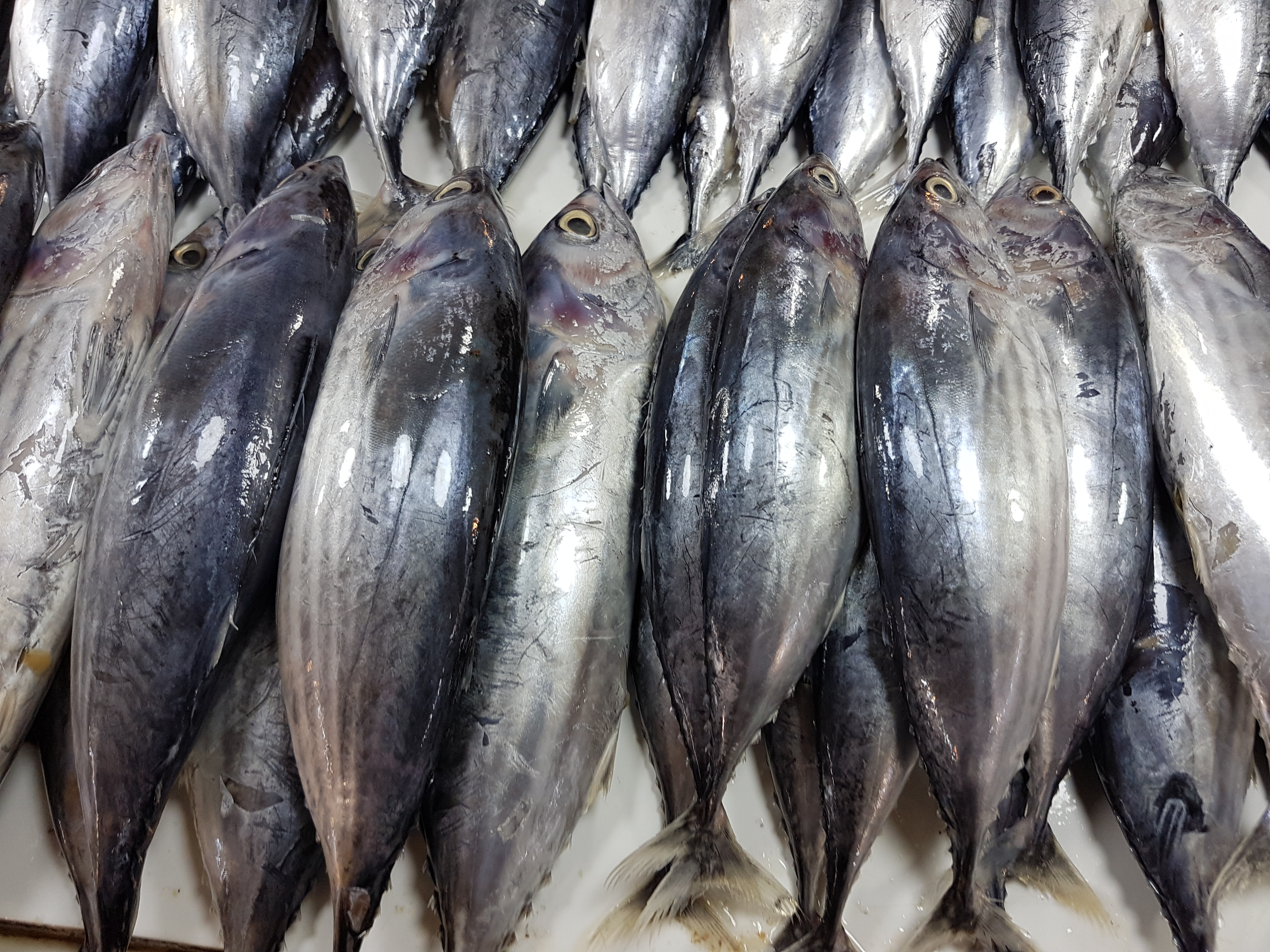
- Skipjack tuna in a Philippines fish market

Conservation status
- Least Concern (IUCN 3.1)

Scientific classification
- Kingdom: Animalia
- Phylum: Chordata
- Class: Actinopterygii
- Division: Teleostei
- Order: Scombriformes
- Family: Scombridae
- Subfamily: Scombrinae
- Tribe: Thunnini
- Genus: Katsuwonus; Kishinouye, 1915
- Species: K. pelamis

Binomial name
- Katsuwonus pelamis (Linnaeus, 1758)

Synonyms
- Euthynnus pelamis (Linnaeus, 1758); Katsuwonus vagans (Lesson, 1829); Scomber pelamys Linnaeus, 1758; Scomber pelamis Linnaeus, 1758; Thynnus vagans Lesson, 1829

= Skipjack tuna =

Species of fish

The skipjack tuna (Note: Also known as the cakalang, katsuo, arctic bonito, mushmouth, oceanic bonito, striped tuna, or victor fish.) (Katsuwonus pelamis) is a perciform fish in the tuna family, Scombridae, and is the only member of the genus Katsuwonus. It is a cosmopolitan pelagic fish found in tropical and warm-temperate waters. Skipjack tuna can grow up to 1.1 m (3 ft 7 in) in length, and is a very important species for fisheries.

== Description ==
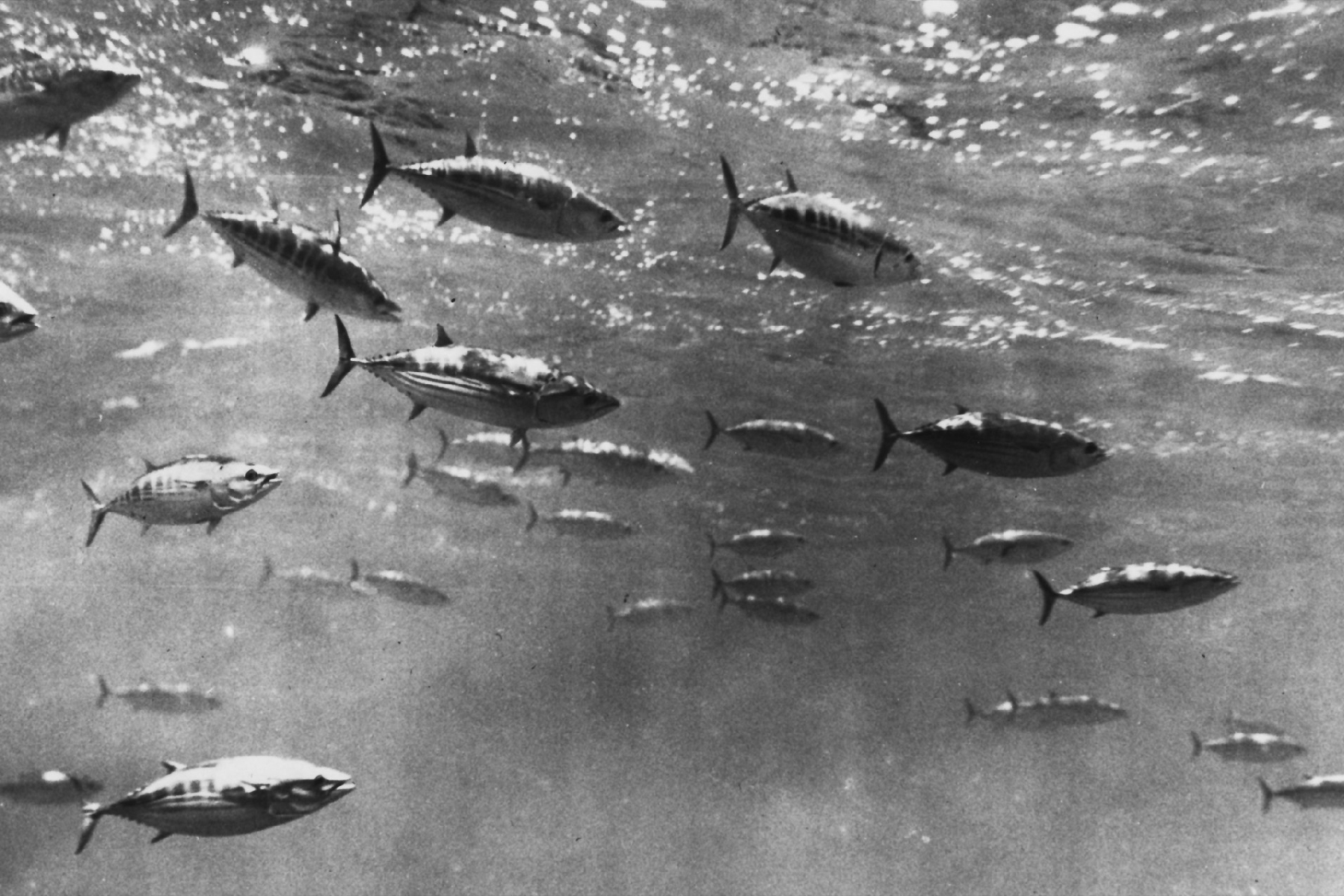
Shoaling skipjack tuna

It is a streamlined, fast-swimming pelagic fish common in tropical waters throughout the world, where it inhabits surface waters in large shoals (up to 50,000 fish, often in combination with other scombridaes), feeding on fish, crustaceans, cephalopods, and mollusks. It is an important prey species for sharks and large pelagic fishes and is often used as live bait when fishing for marlin. It has no scales, except on the lateral line, and circling around the body behind the head forming a large, thick band called a "corselet". Like other tuna, it lacks a swim bladder, and must keep swimming to stay buoyant. It commonly reaches fork lengths up to 80 cm (2 ft 7 in) and a mass of 8–10 kg (18–22 lb). Its maximum fork length is 108 cm (3 ft 7 in), and its maximum mass is 34.5 kg (76 lb). Determining the age of skipjack tuna is difficult, and estimates of its potential lifespan range between 8 and 12 years.

Skipjack tuna has the highest percentage of skeletal muscle devoted to locomotion of all animals, at 68% of the animal's total body mass.

Skipjack tuna are highly sensitive to environmental conditions and changes. Climate change effects are significant in marine ecosystems, and ecological factors may change fish distribution and catchability.

=== Behaviour ===
Skipjack tuna are batch spawners. Spawning occurs year-round in equatorial waters, but it gets more seasonal further away from the equator. Fork length at first spawning is about 45 cm (18 in). It is also known for its potent smell.

== Taxonomy ==
The genus name Katsuwonus comes from the Japanese name for the fish, katsuo (鰹/かつお).

== Fisheries ==
Global capture of Skipjack tuna (Katsuwonus pelamis) in million tonnes from 1950 to 2022, as reported by the FAO

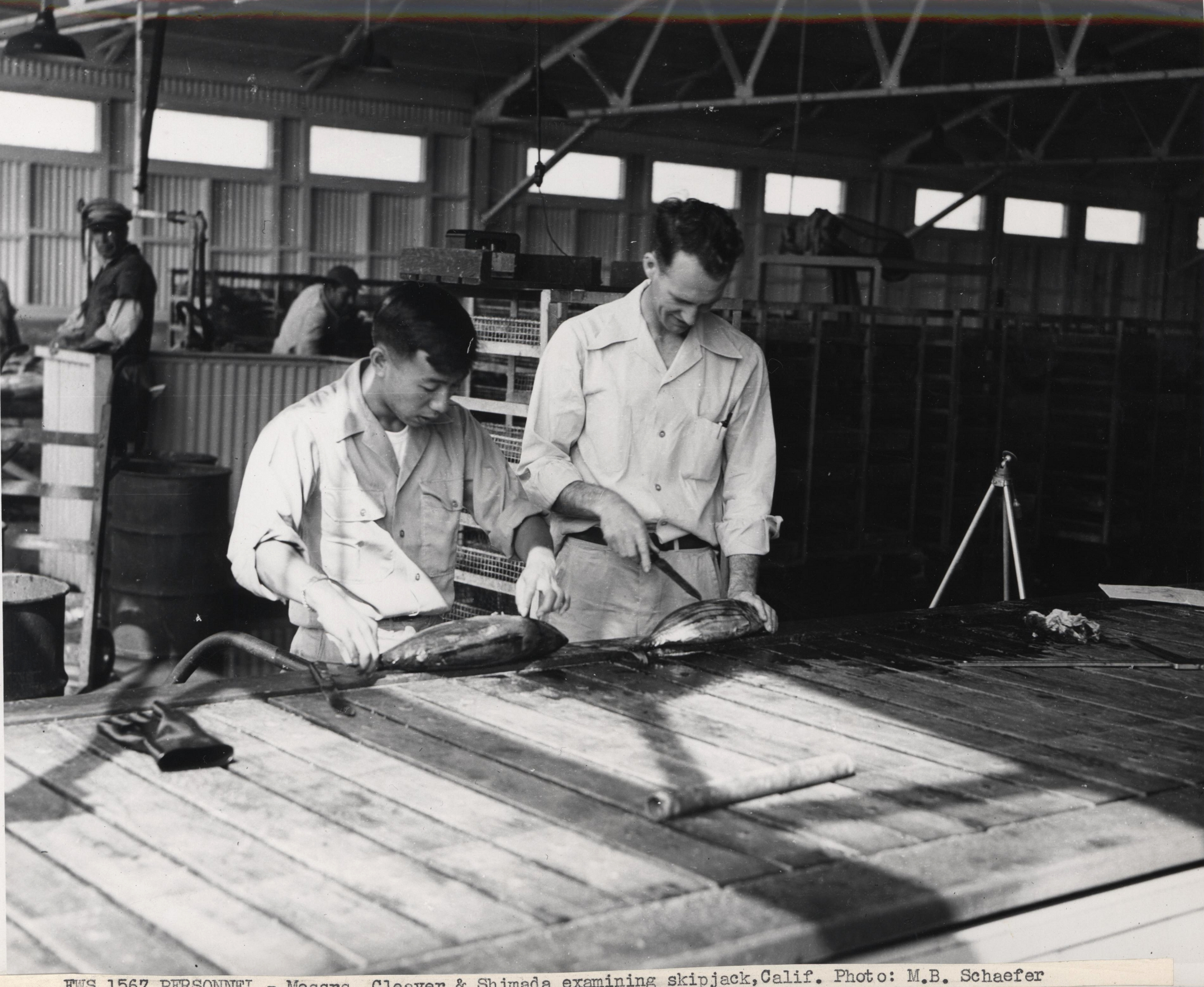
Bell M. Shimada and Fred Cleaver examining skipjack tuna

It is an important commercial and game fish, usually caught using purse seine nets, and is sold fresh, frozen, canned, dried, salted, and smoked. In 2018, landings of 3.2 million tonnes (3.5 million short tons) were reported, the third highest of any marine capture fishery (after Peruvian anchoveta and Alaska pollock). Countries recording large amounts of skipjack catches include the Maldives, France, Spain, Malaysia, Sri Lanka, and Indonesia.

Skipjack is the most fecund of the main commercial tunas, and its population is considered sustainable against its current consumption. Its fishing is still controversial due to the methodology, with rod and reel or fishery options being promoted as ecologically preferable. Purse seine methods are considered unsustainable by some authorities due to excess bycatch, although bycatch is said to be much reduced if fish aggregation devices are not used. These considerations have led to the availability of canned skipjack marked with the fishing method used to catch it. As much as 95% of skipjack tuna catches may be used as canned tuna.

Skipjack is considered to have "moderate" mercury contamination. As a result, pregnant women are advised against eating large quantities. In addition, skipjack's livers were tested globally for tributyltin (TBT) contamination. TBT is an organotin compound introduced into marine ecosystems through antifouling paint used on ship hulls and has been determined to be very toxic. About 90% of skipjack tested positive for contamination, especially in Southeast Asia, where regulations of TBT use are less rigorous than in Europe or the US.

== As food ==
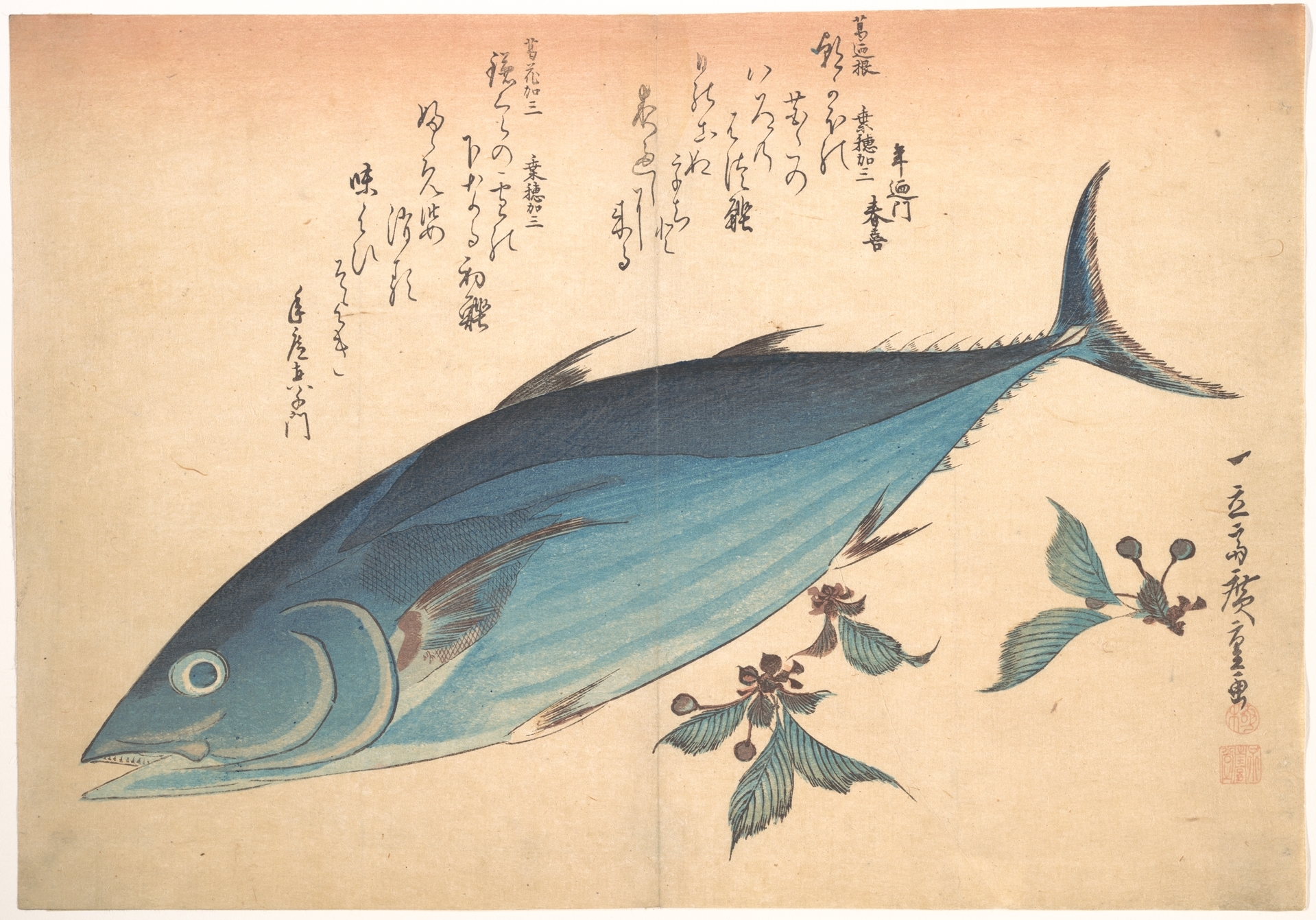
Katsuo Fish with Cherry Buds, print by Utagawa Hiroshige, 1830s

=== Japan ===
Skipjack tuna or katsuo (鰹/かつお) is used extensively in Japanese cuisine. It is eaten raw in sushi and sashimi, as well as slightly seared in katsuo tataki. It is also smoked and dried to make katsuobushi, and the shavings are commonly used to make dashi (soup stock). Katsuobushi flakes are also used as seasoning, such as in onigiri (rice balls) or on top of tofu. The raw viscera of skipjack tuna is salted and fermented to make shutō, a type of shiokara.

The fish's fat content changes during migrations along the Japanese islands. When they migrate north in summer, they are called hatsugatsuo ("first katsuo") or noborigatsuo ("ascending katsuo"), and have a lesser amount of fat. When they migrate south in autumn, they are called modorigatsuo ("returning katsuo") or kudarigatsuo ("descending katsuo"), and have a high level of fat.

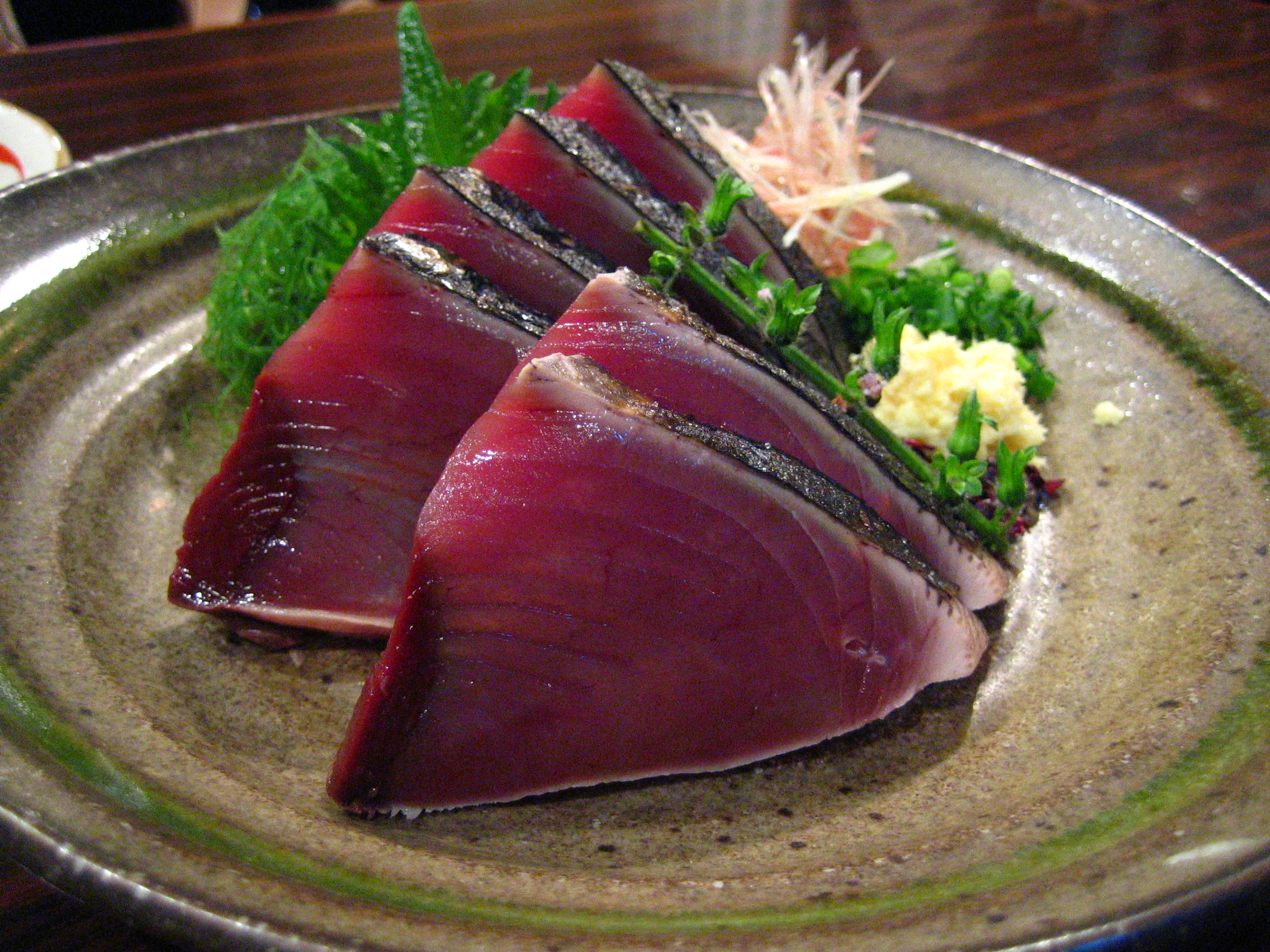
Katsuo no tataki, seared skipjack

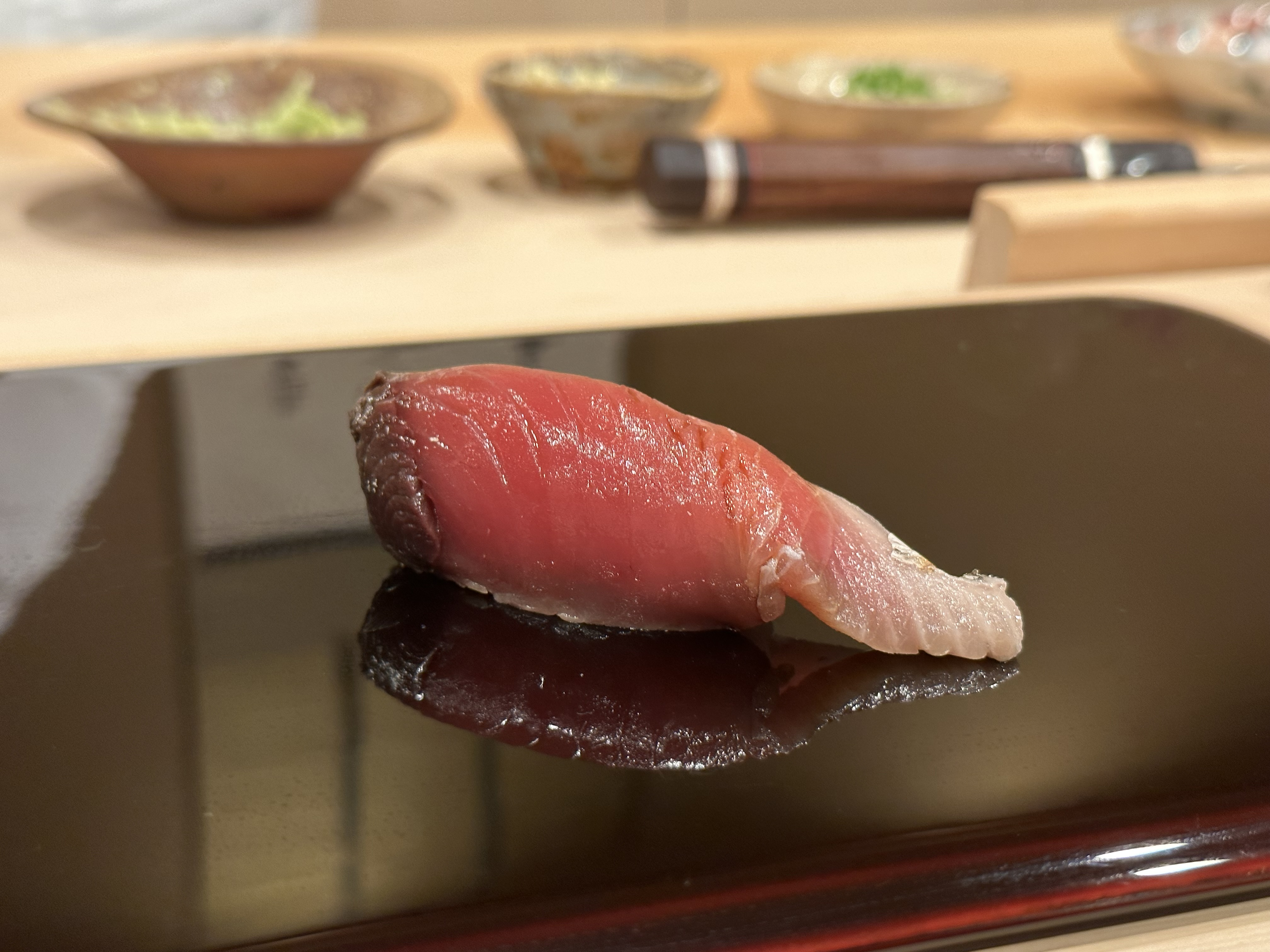
As sushi

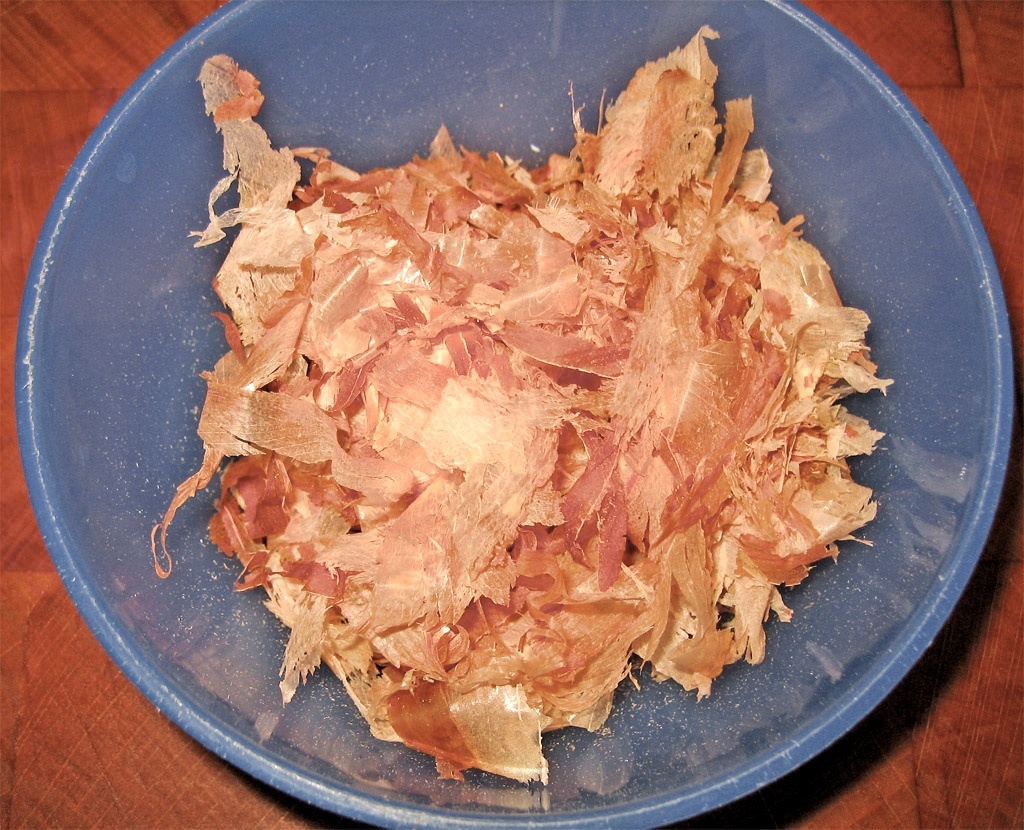
Katsuobushi flakes

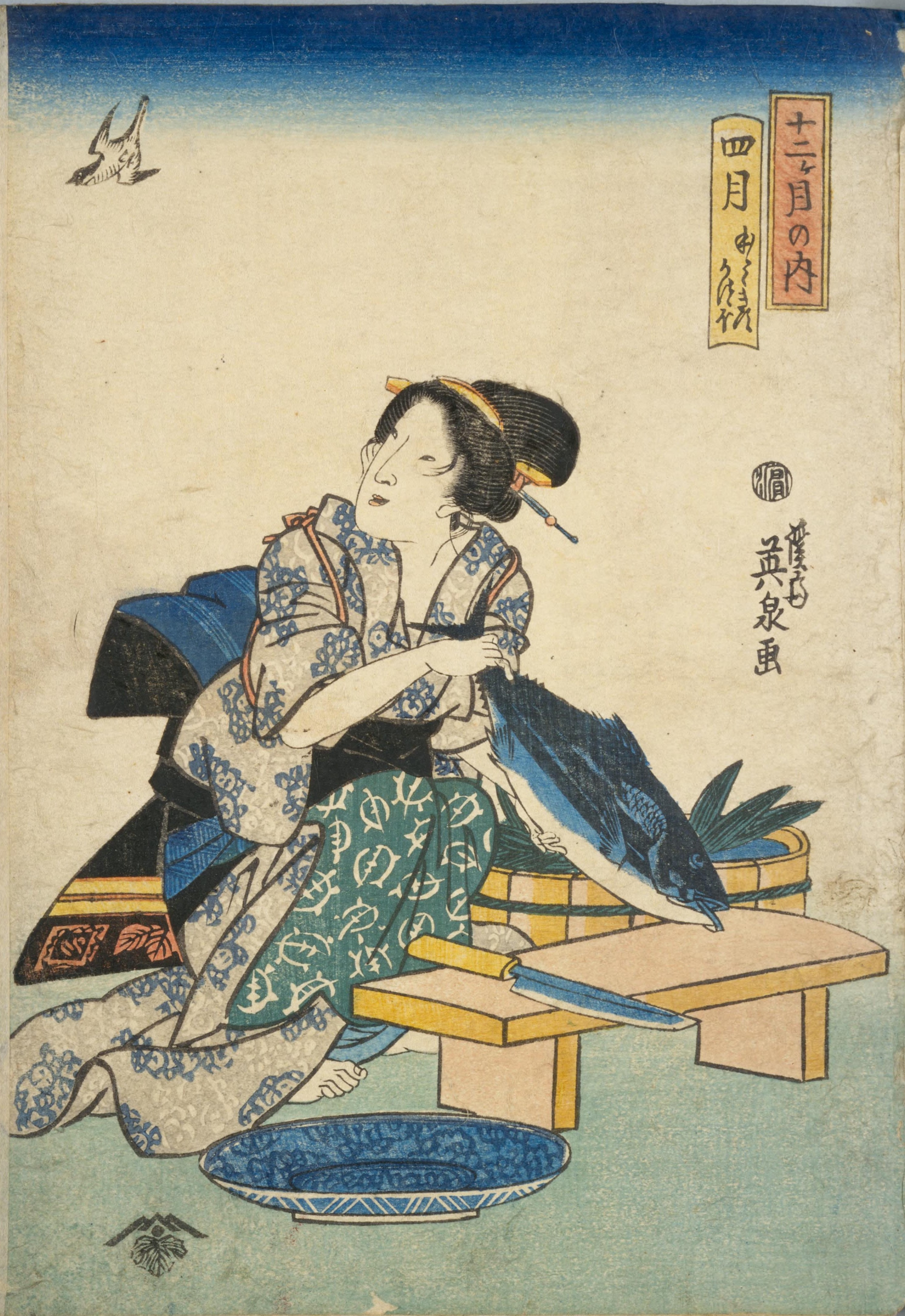
Woman preparing Katsuo, by Keisai Eisen (1790–1848)

=== Other places ===
In Indonesian cuisine, skipjack tuna is known as cakalang. The most popular Indonesian dish made from skipjack tuna is cakalang fufu from Minahasa. It is a cured and smoked skipjack tuna dish, made by cooking the fish after clipping it to a bamboo frame.

Skipjack known as kalhubilamas in Maldives is integral to Maldivian cuisine.

Skipjack tuna is an important fish in the native cuisine of Hawaii (where it is known as aku) and throughout the Pacific islands. Hawaiians prefer to eat aku either raw as a sashimi or poke or seared in Japanese tataki style.

The trade in pickled skipjack tuna is a driving force behind the commercial fishery of this species in Spain.

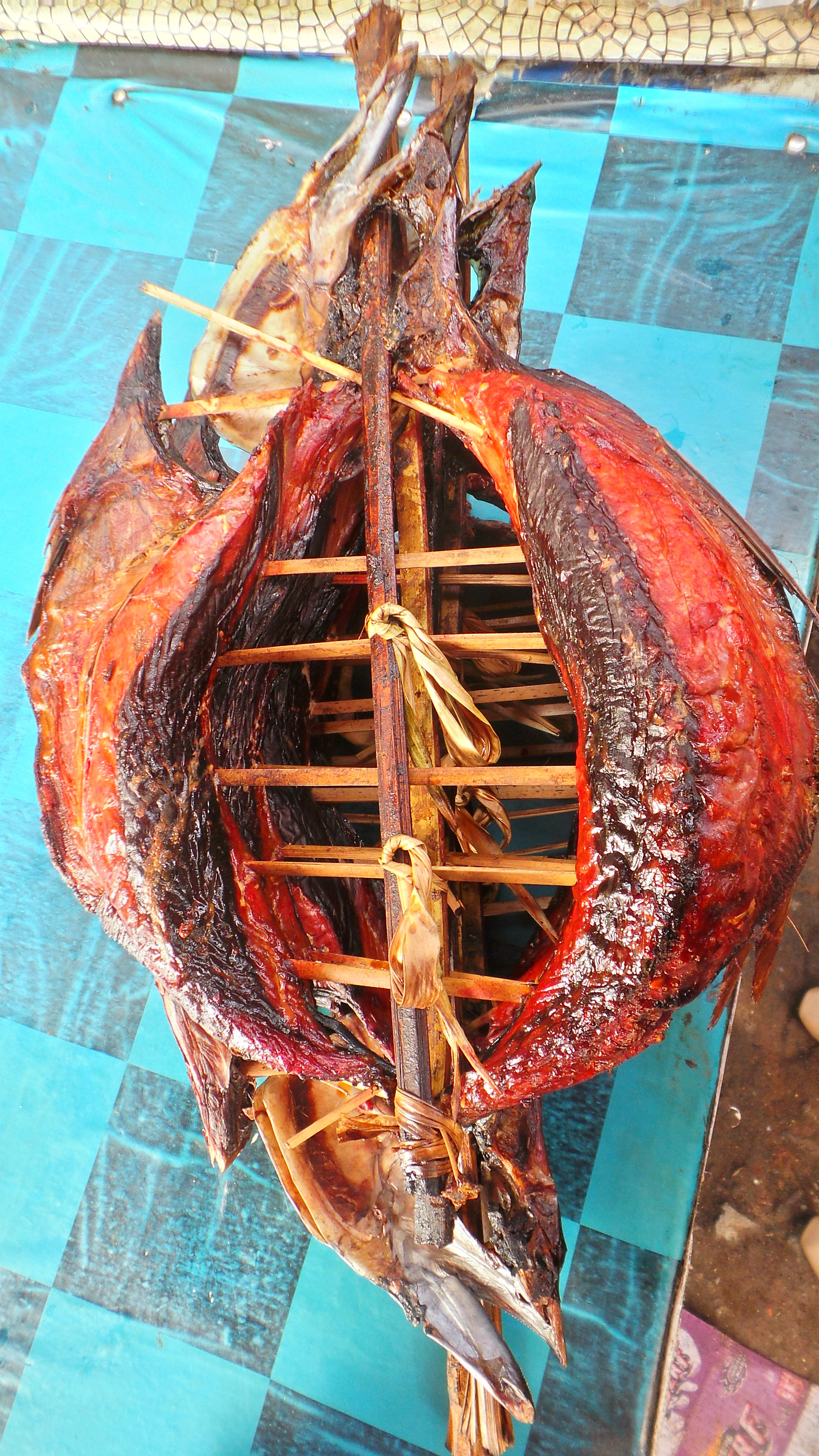
Indonesian cakalang fufu

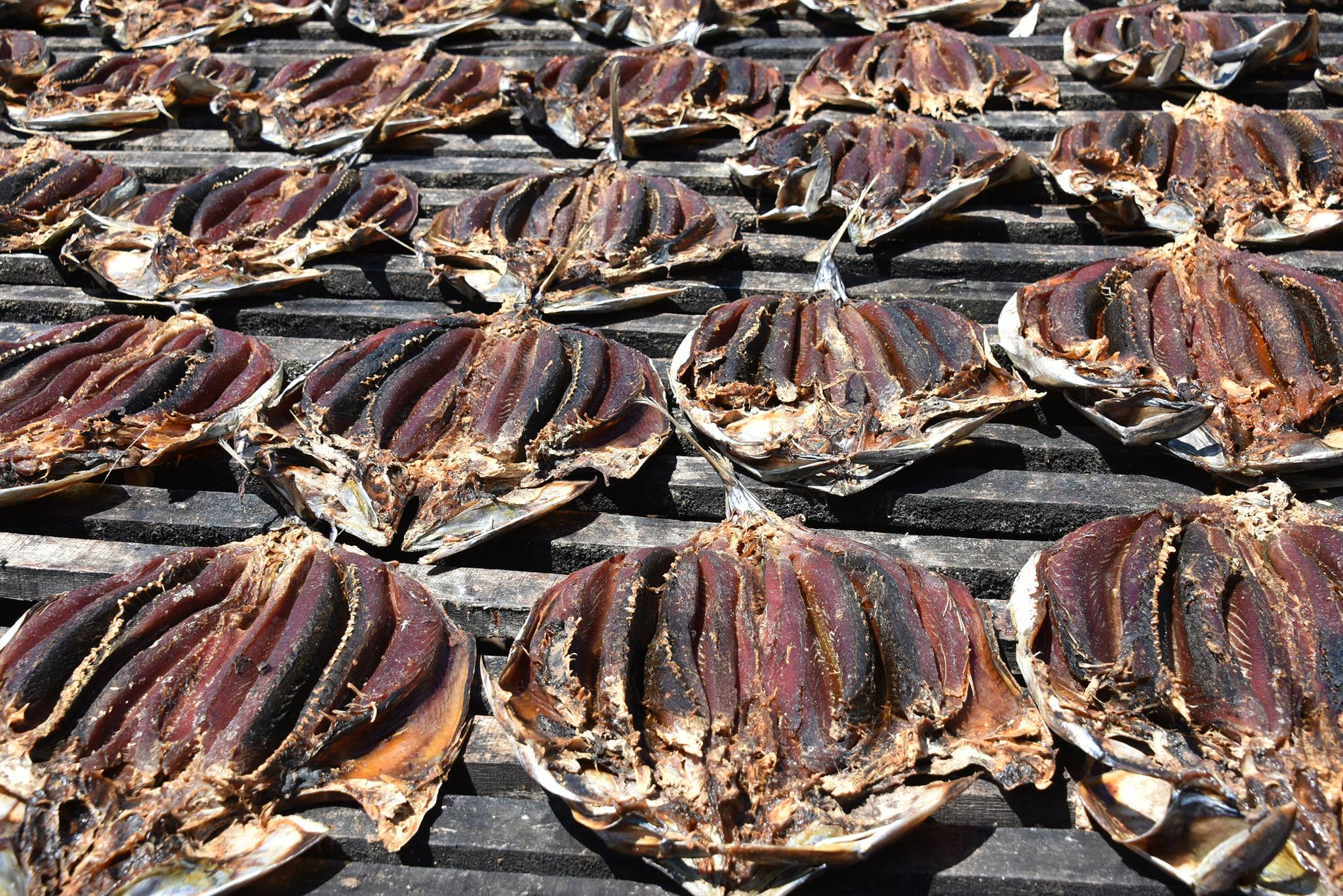
Skipjack drying on Madeira Island

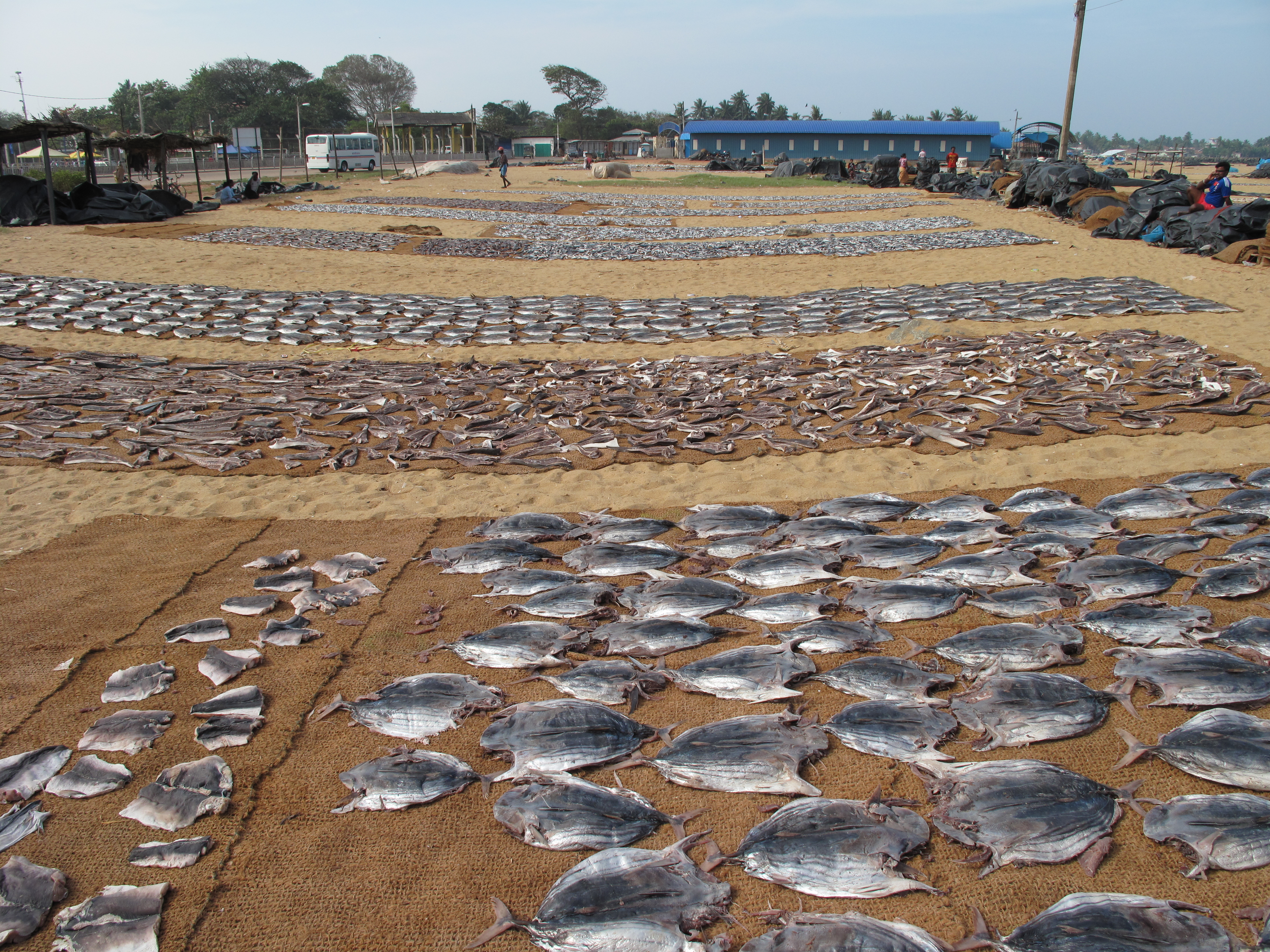
Skipjack drying in Negombo, Sri Lanka

== Sources ==
- Pacific skipjack tuna NOAA FishWatch. Retrieved 5 November 2012.
- Western Atlantic skipjack tuna NOAA FishWatch. Retrieved 5 November 2012.
