= Konowata =

Japanese seafood

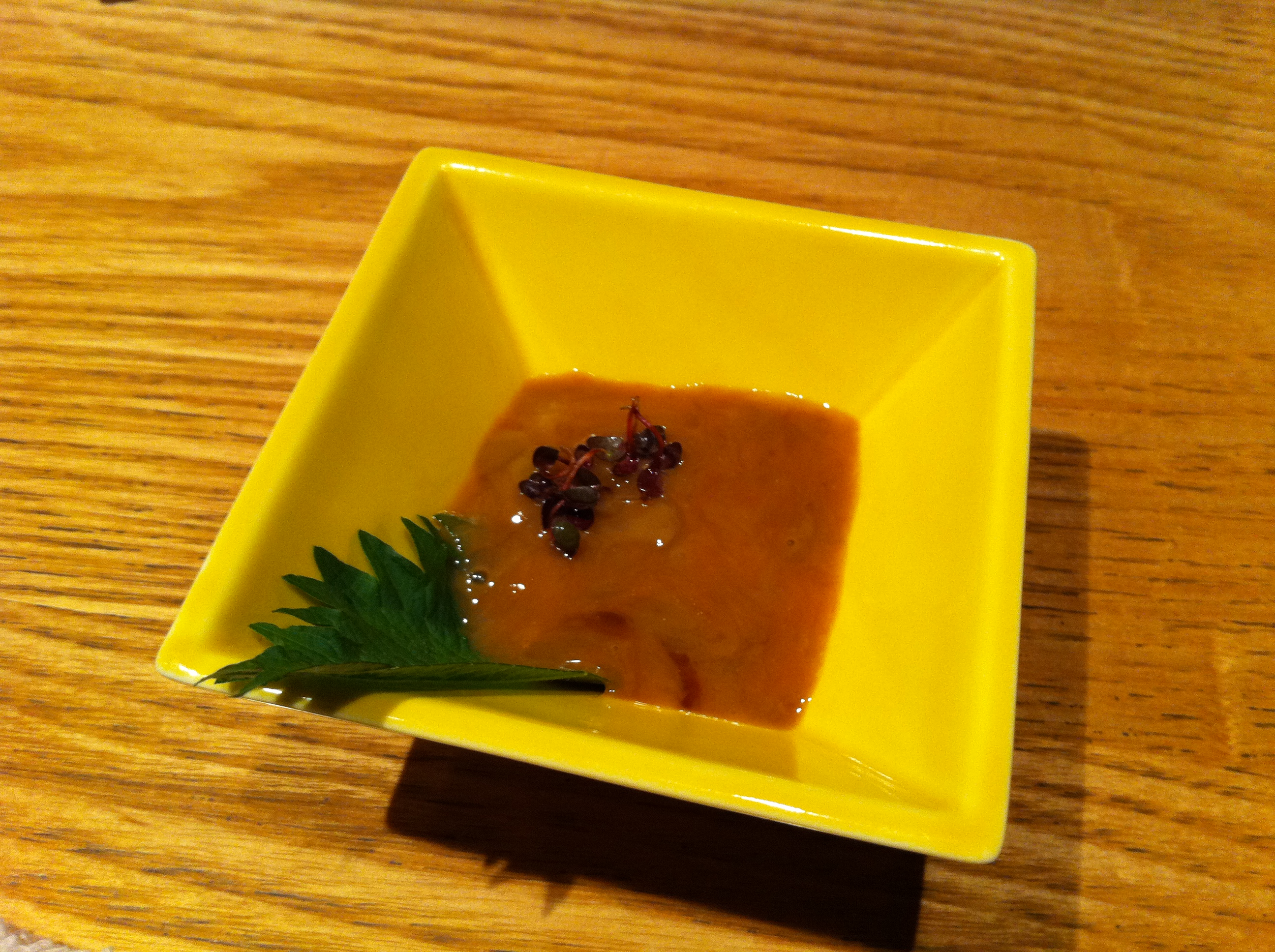
Konowata

Konowata is a kind of shiokara (fermented salted seafood), made from sea cucumber intestines. It is one of Japan's chinmi (rare taste).

The Noto Peninsula, Ise Bay, and Mikawa Bay have long been known as production centers, but today it is manufactured in various regions, including the Seto Inland Sea.

Ko is Japanese for sea cucumber, no indicates possession, and wata means internal organs.

== Method of manufacture ==
Sea cucumbers are used as the source of konowata; Apostichopus japonicus is considered delicious.

First, the sea cucumbers are left in a fish tank set up in the sea near the work site for about two days until some of the food residue and feces inside their intestinal tracts are excreted. The ventral side near the mouth is ripped with a small knife about 5–6 cm in length. The sea cucumber is turned upside down, and the internal organs are pulled out by inserting fingers through the cut while draining the internal body fluid.

The intestines are squeezed out with fingertips to squeeze out the remaining sand inside, and then separated into three parts: the intestinal tract, respiratory tree (called "the second part of the sea squirt intestine"), and gonads, as well as sandy mud. Gonads and the sea cucumber itself are used as separate ingredients.

The intestines are rinsed well in seawater, drained in a colander, and put into a container and mixed with salt. A little more than 10% salt by weight is used to the intestines, which are ready for eating in two to three days.

== Eating and nutritional value ==
Konowata
Nutritional value per 100 g (3.5 oz)
- Energy: 268 kJ (64 kcal)
- Carbohydrates: 0 g
- Sugars: 0 g
- Dietary fiber: 0 g
- Fat: 1.8 g
- Saturated: 100 mg
- Monounsaturated: 190 mg
- Polyunsaturated: 350 mg
- Protein: 11.4 g
Vitamins and minerals
Minerals	Quantity %DV^{†}
Calcium	3% 41 mg
Iron	22% 4.0 mg
Magnesium	23% 95 mg
Phosphorus	14% 170 mg
Potassium	11% 330 mg
Sodium	78% 1800 mg
- Other constituents: Quantity
- Water: 80.2 g
- Cholesterol: 1.0 mg
- ^{†}Percentages estimated using US recommendations for adults, except for potassium, which is estimated based on expert recommendation from the National Academies.

Konowata is often served on top of freshly cooked hot rice. At restaurants and inns, a small amount is placed in a small bowl, sometimes with a Japanese quail's egg. It is sometimes made into konowata-zake, which is hot sake with a small amount of konowata added.

The konowata-jiru, or "konowata soup", in which konowata is cut into small pieces with a knife and added to thin soup stock or miso soup, is also often eaten.

== History ==
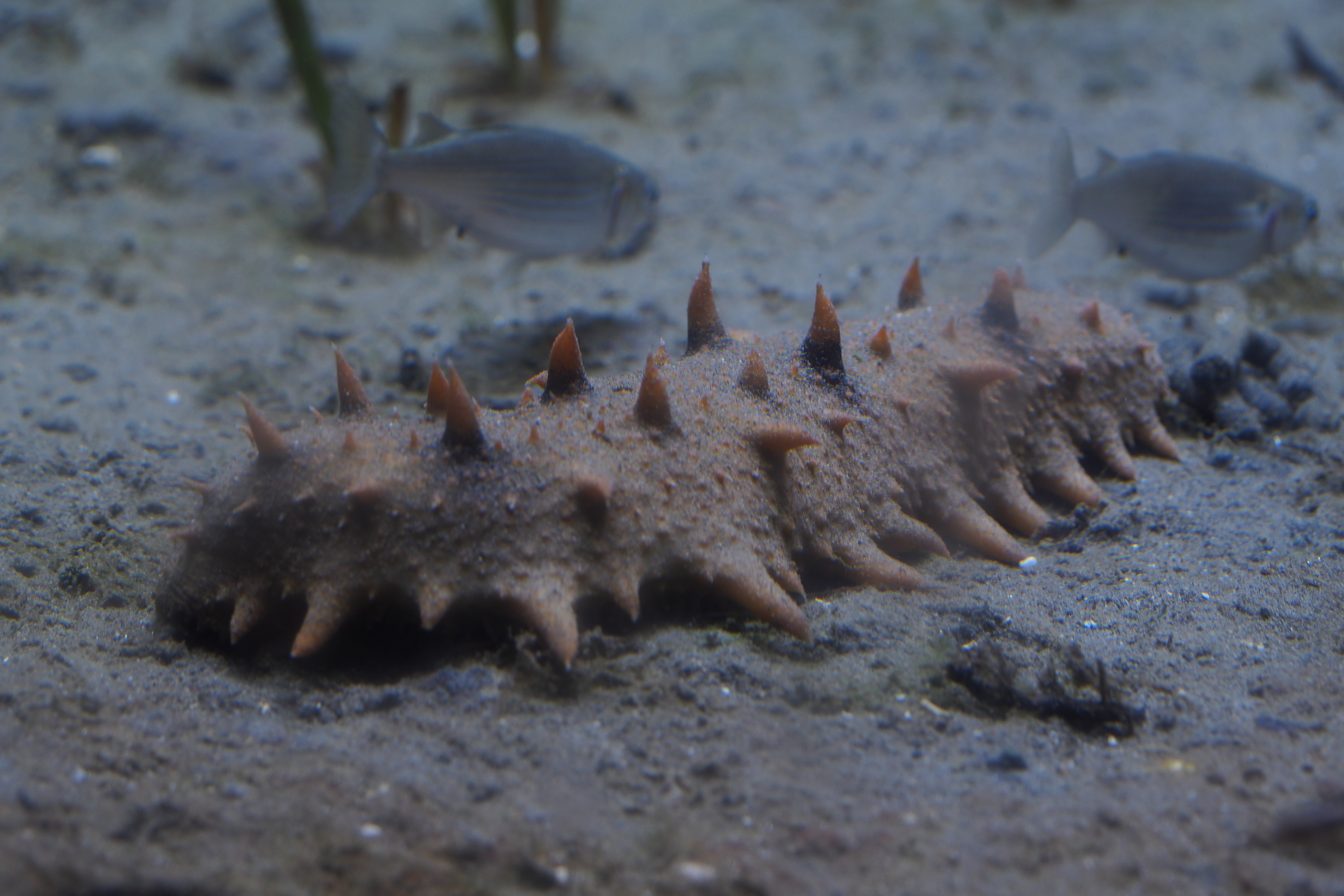
Japanese sea cucumber

In the Engishiki, which was established in 927, "One koku of sea squirt intestine" is listed among the tribute imposed by the central government on Noto Province.

The 15th-century Ninagawa Chikamoto Diary also mentions that Hatakeyama Yoshimune presented Ashikaga Yoshimasa with "one hundred tubs of sea gut" as a gift, as well as "one hundred tubs of konohata" for Hino Tomiko and "fifty tubs of konohata" for Yoshimoto's parents. Some believe that this "tub" is a small container with a diameter of about 6 cm.

The recipe for making konowata is described as a secret recipe in the cookbook Shijoryu-Houchou-sho (四条流庖丁書) from around 1489.

There is also a description of konowata in the Hoko Kakugo No Koto (Preparedness for Service), thought to have been written in the late 15th century, which states that "konowata is eaten with chopsticks with a tub."

In 1522, Ashikaga Yoshiharu, the twelfth shōgun of the Ashikaga shogunate, ate konowata when he went to the Gion Festival.

The Diary of Odachi Joko (大舘常興日記) states that in 1539, warlord Hatakeyama Yoshifusa of Noto Province gave konowata as a gift for the New Year.

In 1583, konowata is provided in the Kaiseki issued by Sen no Rikyū to Araki Murashige.

The Muromachi-dono Diary (室町殿日記,) completed around the beginning of the 17th century, contains the following regarding Toyotomi Hideyoshi, who ruled Japan at the end of the 15th century.

When Toyotomi Hideyoshi invited his friends over for a chat, one of the lords presented him with three items: oysters, moon shell, and konowata. Hideyoshi ordered Hosokawa Yusai, who was there, to compose a waka poem reading this gift. Hideyoshi praised the poem and everyone enjoyed eating the gift.

In 1603, at the beginning of the modern period, it was recorded in Nippo Jisho (Japanese-Portuguese dictionary) as cono vata.

In the Oyudono-no-ue-no-Nikki (御湯殿上日記) of 1603, there is an account of Tokugawa Ieyasu, who had just become a Shogun, presenting a konowata to the Kyoto Imperial Palace.

In 1635, konowata was served for breakfast when Date Masamune entertained Shogun Tokugawa Iemitsu at the Ninomaru of Edo Castle.

There is also a description of konowata in Shokumotsu-honzo (食物本草) published in 1671, which explains the medicinal and toxic properties of food.

There is also a description of konowata in Suisho zakki (遂生雑記,) a manual of food ingredients published in 1682.

The 'Honcho-Shokkan (本朝食鑑) established in 1697 also includes a commentary on konowata. According to it,

The process involves washing the intestines of fresh sea cucumbers in seawater until there is no more sand or dirty juice. After that, it can be done by mixing it with salt and preserving it. If done well, it will be yellow, similar to amber. The inferior ones have black or white foreign matter mixed in there. It is also tasty when mixed with egg yolks. In the old days, the country of Noto was considered the place of origin, and it is listed in the Engishiki. Currently, Owari and Mikawa products are the best, followed by those from Musashi Province. Many regions take sea cucumbers, but do not produce konowata. This is because few people prefer konowata. In the past, there was a monk in Mikawa who was very good at making konowata, which is why Mikawa became famous for konowata. Later, this monk moved to Owari, which also became famous for konowata.

In the Edo period, the lord of the Maeda clan, which ruled the Kaga Domain, declared processed sea cucumbers a government monopoly and prohibited their production outside of the places designated by the lord. In a 1757 instruction on thrift by Maeda Shigemichi, the 9th daimyō of Kaga Domain, it is written that sea cucumbers and konowata may be served as a New Year's dish to entertain guests.

The "Wakan sansai tukai" also includes a section on "sea squirts" in Millennium No. 51 (Fish), and also mentions this fish guts

In the Wakan Sansai Zue, konowata is described as follows,

konowata is made by fermenting the three intestines of sea cucumbers in salt. It is fragrant and a perfect snack for winter and spring. After New Year's, it becomes too salty to eat.

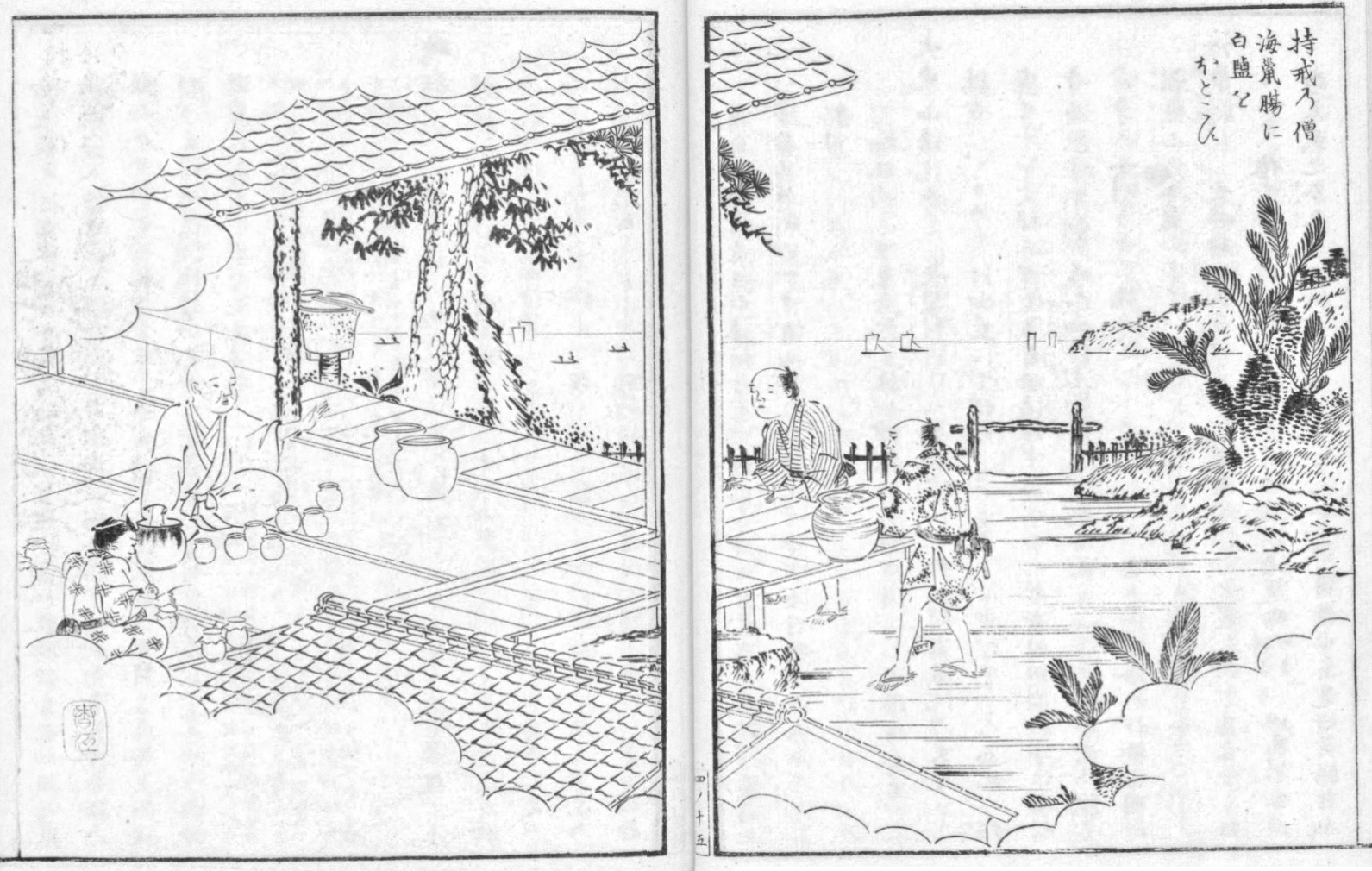
A master monk of konowata making written in Owari meisho zue

The Owari meisho zue, published in the 19th century, contains illustrations of the monks featured in the aforementioned Honcho-Shokkan.

In 1811, Kurimoto Masayoshi wrote the following in his Senchufu (千蟲譜):

Although we call it namako today, it was called ko once upon a time, and this is why the snack that goes well with sake, made from the intestines of namako (sea cucumber), is called konowata.

The 19th century Japanese poet Rai San'yō wrote that he composed a poem in gratitude for the gift of konowata.
