= Ankimo =

Japanese monkfish liver dish

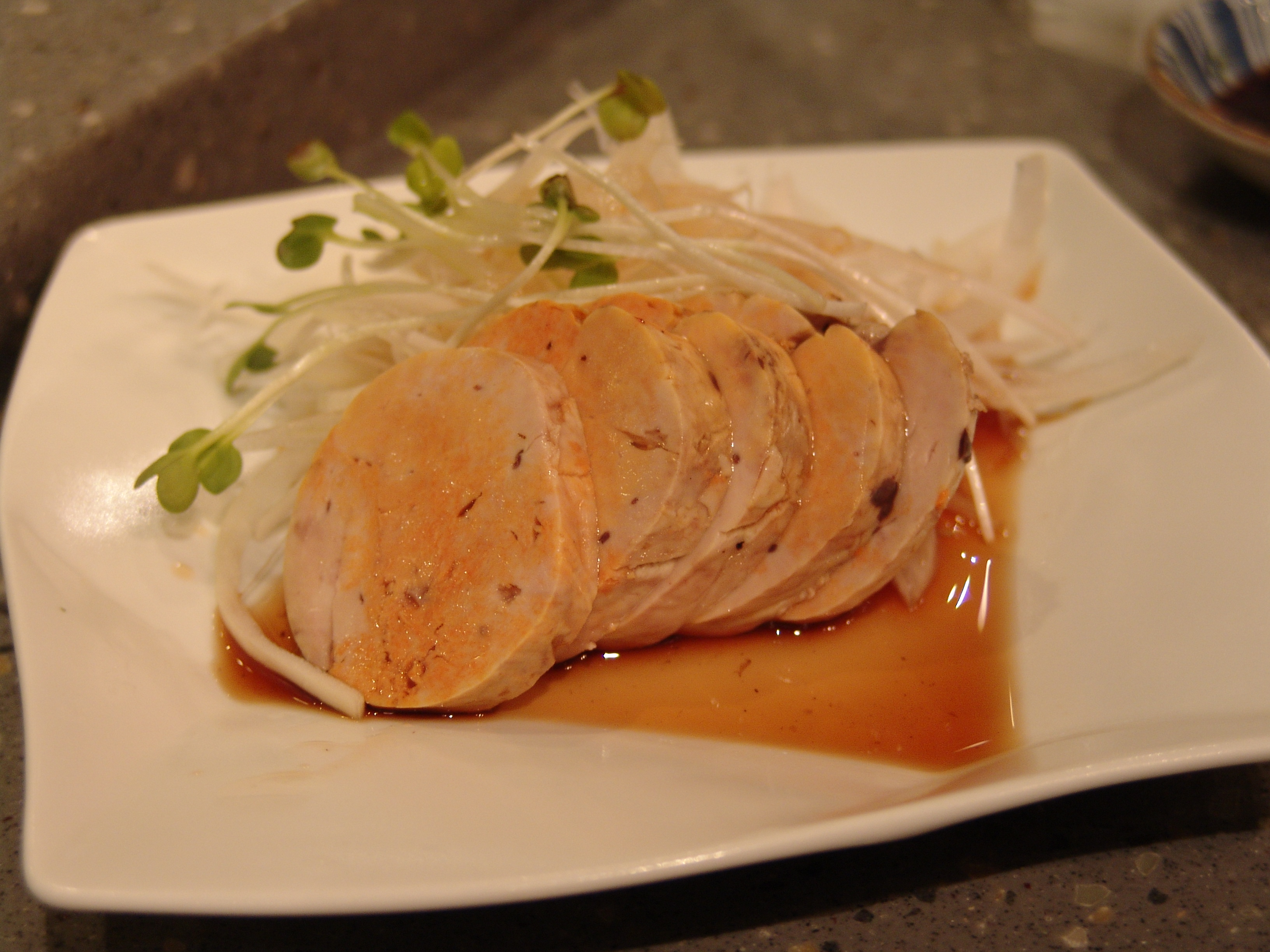
- Slices of ankimo
- Type: Offal
- Place of origin: Japan
- Serving temperature: Hot, cold
- Main ingredients: Monkfish liver

Ankimo (鮟肝) is a Japanese dish made with monkfish liver.

The liver is first rubbed with salt, then rinsed with sake. Any veins are removed, and then the liver is rolled into a cylinder, and cooked by steaming. Ankimo is often served with momiji-oroshi (chili-tinted grated daikon), thinly sliced scallions and ponzu sauce.

Ankimo is considered one of the chinmi (delicacies) of Japan. It is listed at number 32 on The World's 50 Best Foods compiled by CNN Go.

== Preparations ==
Ankimo is most often consumed outside of Japan as sushi or sashimi. Inside Japan, ankimo is used in several meibutsu, regional delicacies, such as dobu-jiru, stewed ankimo and vegetables from Fukushima.

== Gallery ==
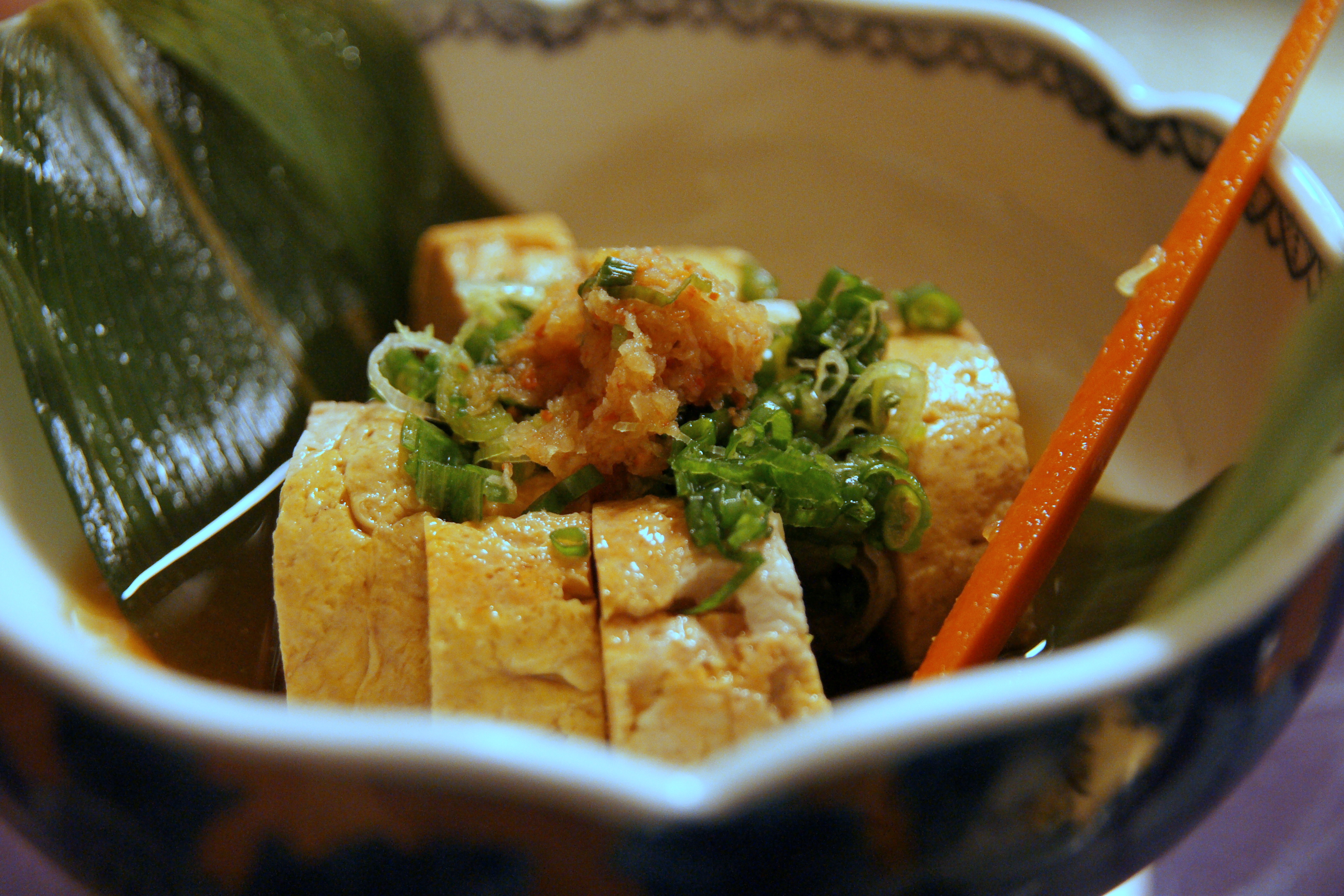

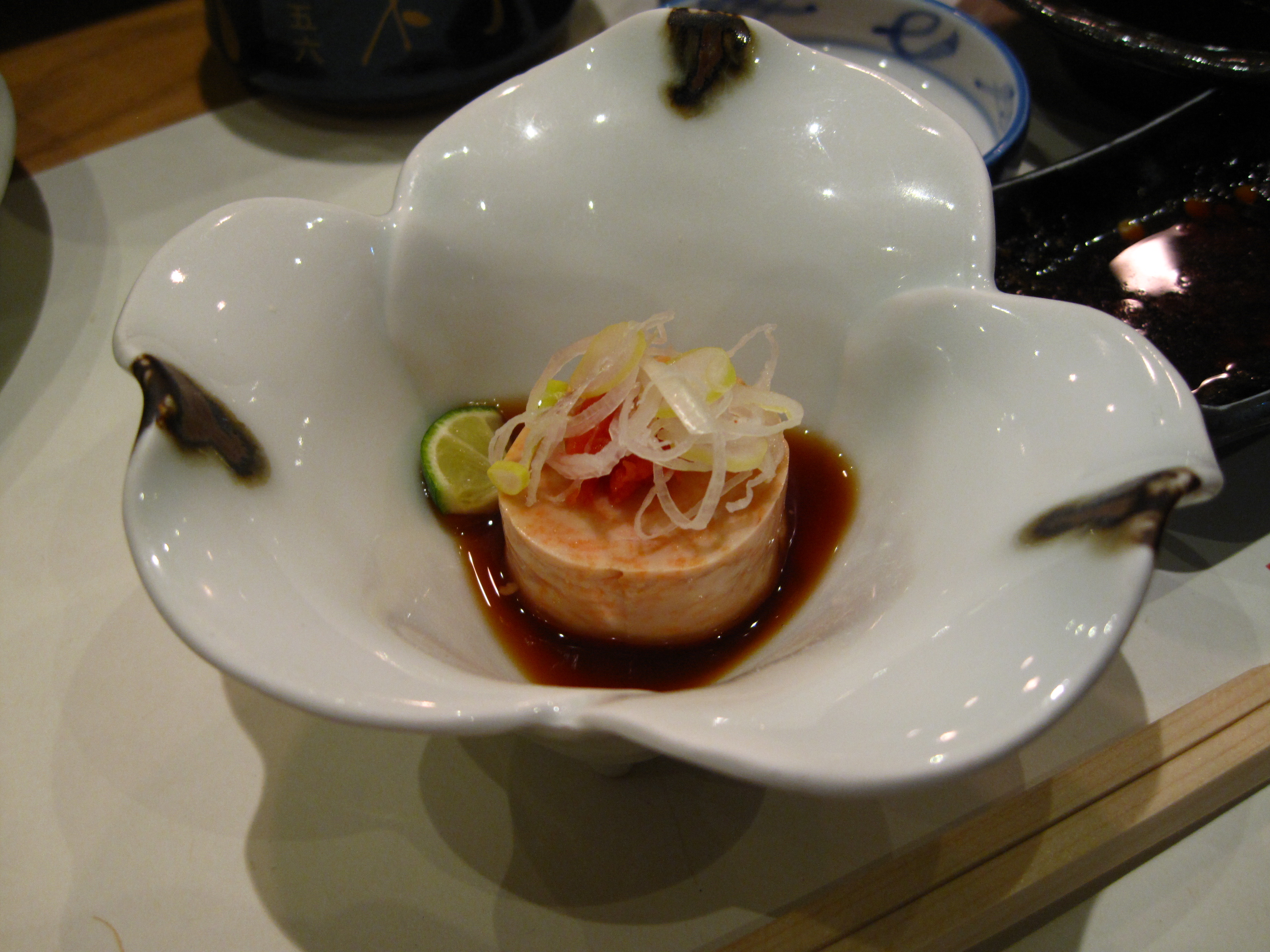

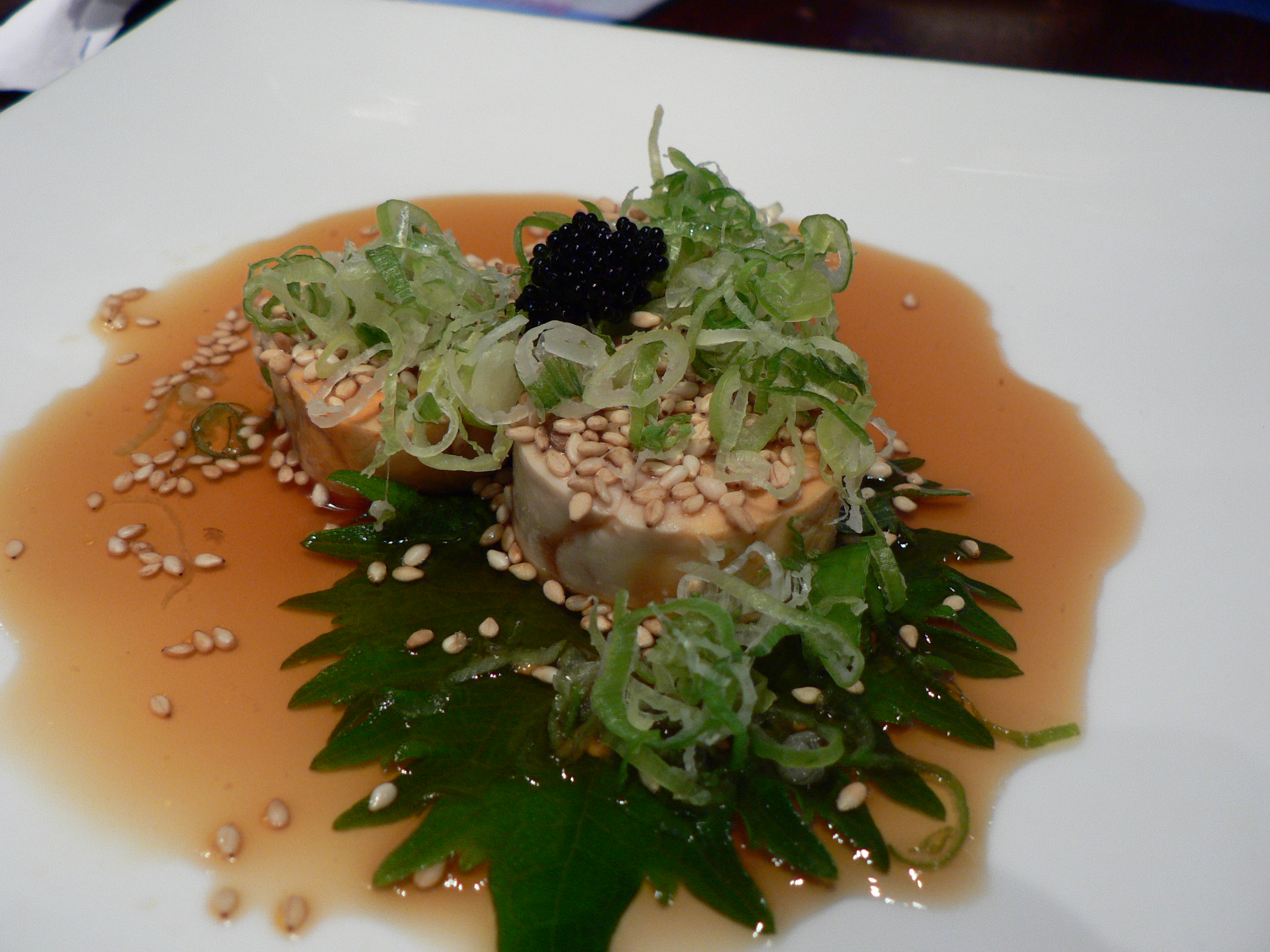

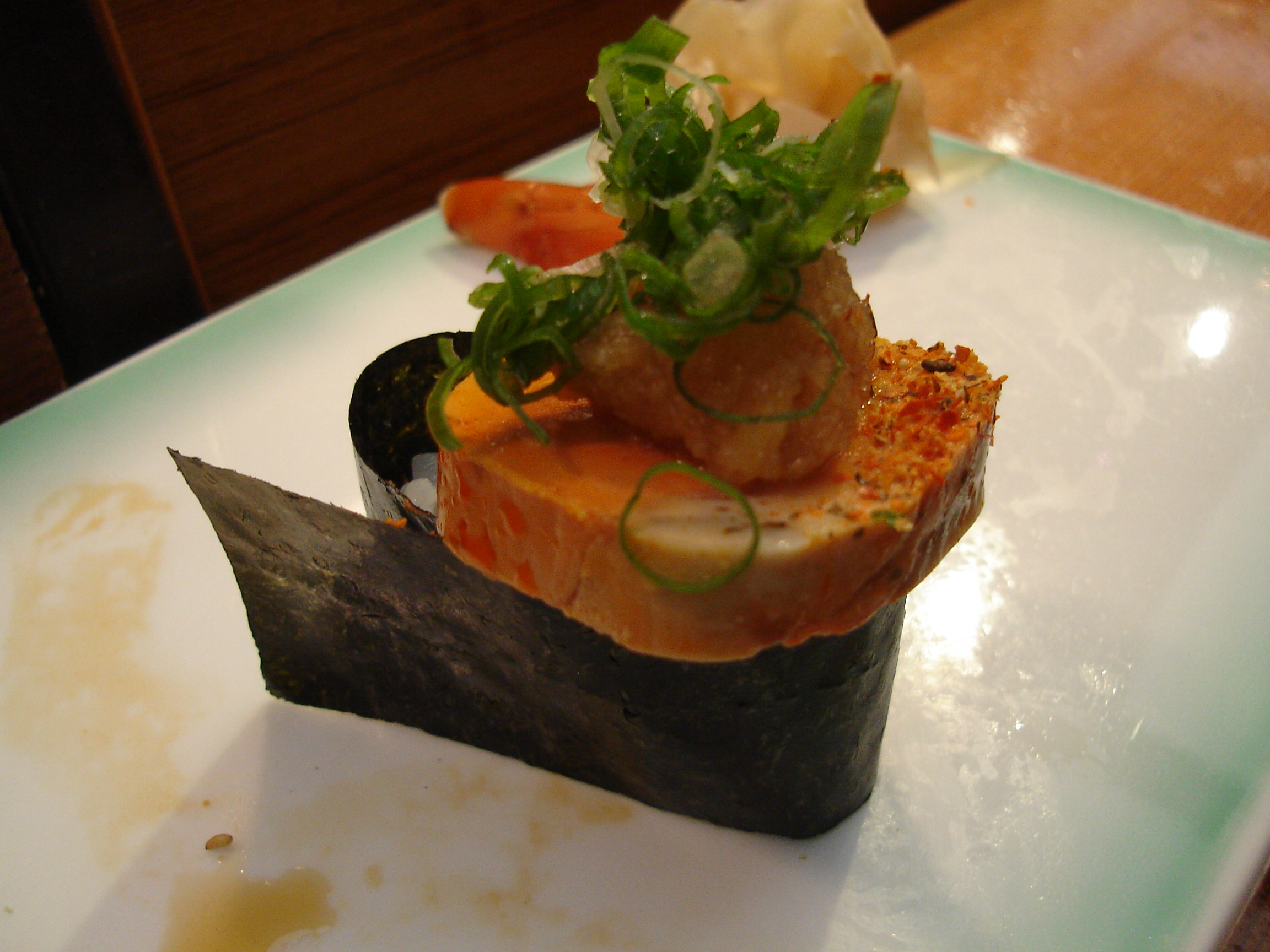

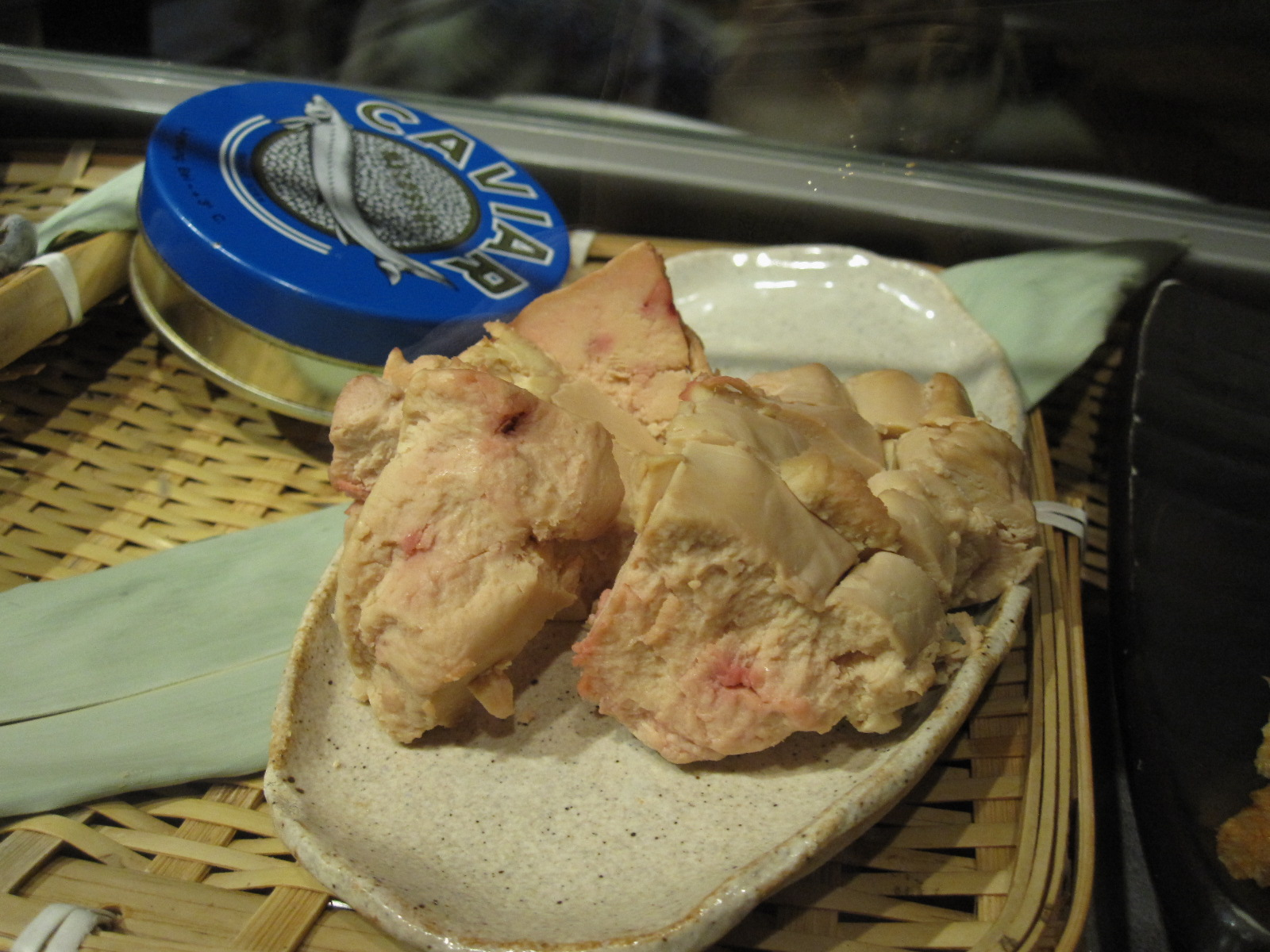

== See also ==
- Chinmi
- Meibutsu
