= Dorome =

Dorome are a local specialty of Kōchi Prefecture in Japan. In the Tosa dialect, dorome refers to sardine fry 2–3 cm in length. They are eaten fresh, dipped in a sauce made from minced garlic greens, vinegar and miso. It is often served at bars and pubs along with alcohol.

Akaoka Town in Kōchi Prefecture has an annual Dorome Festival celebrating this local delicacy. The main event is a drinking competition between local men and women to see who can drink an oversized cup of sake they call a masu the fastest.
