= Shutō (seafood) =

Japanese seafood dish

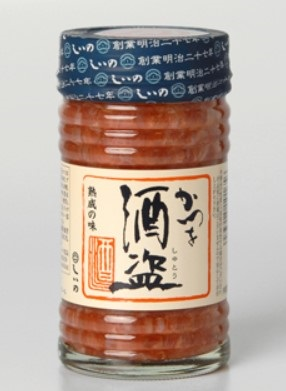
Shuto in glass jar

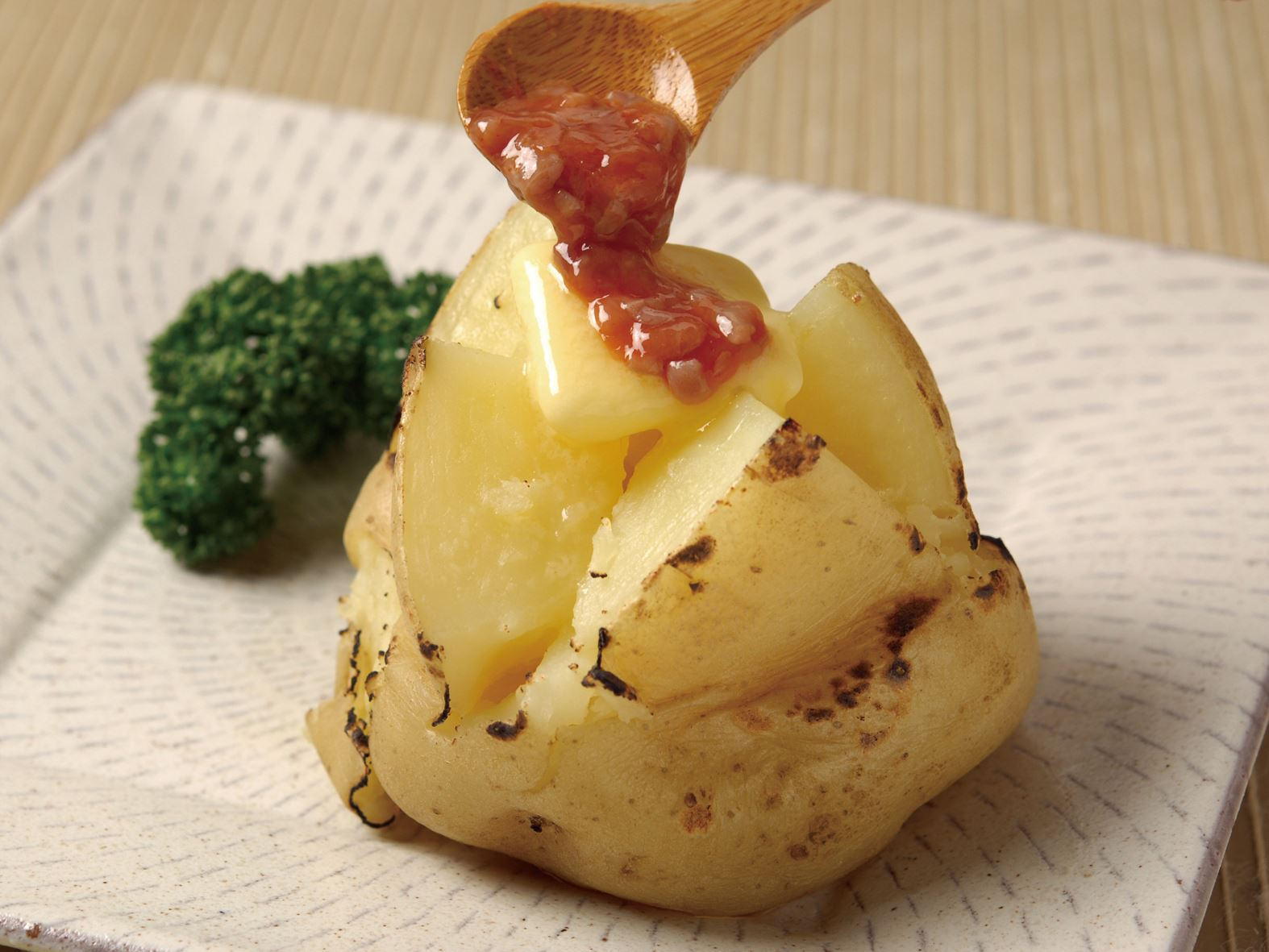
Butter Potato Shuto

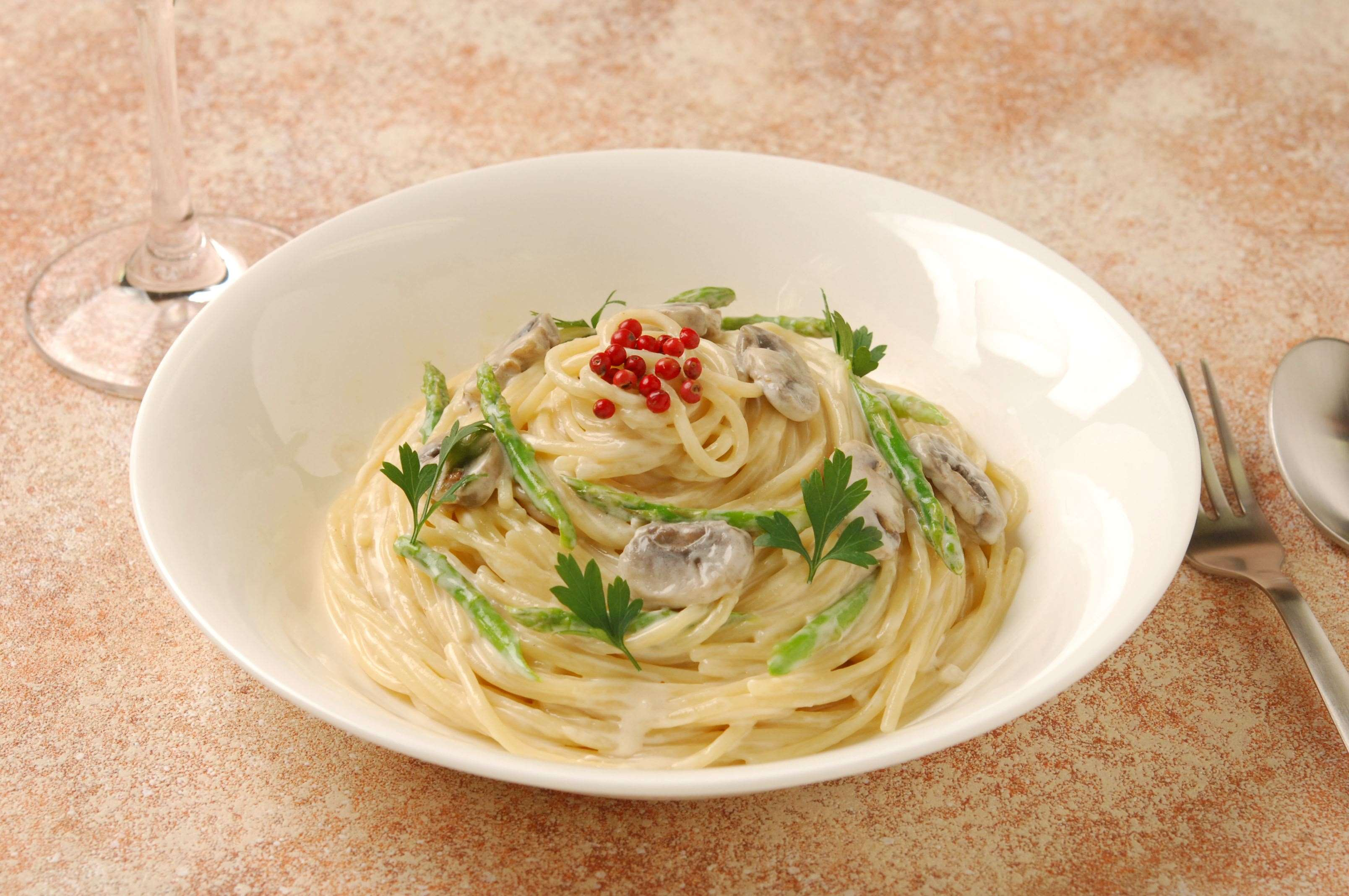
Cream Cheese Shuto Pasta

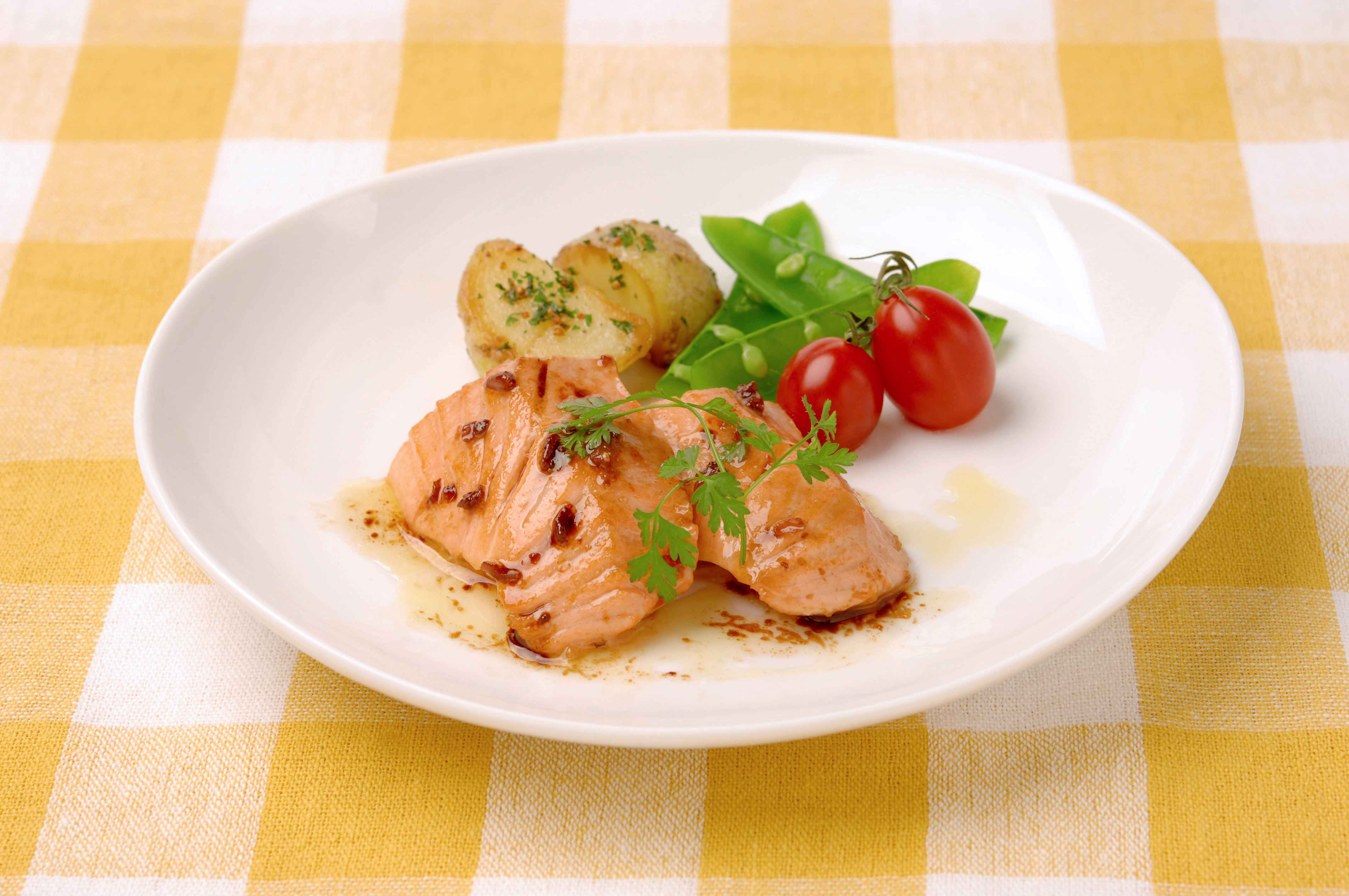
Salmon Meuniere Shuto flavour

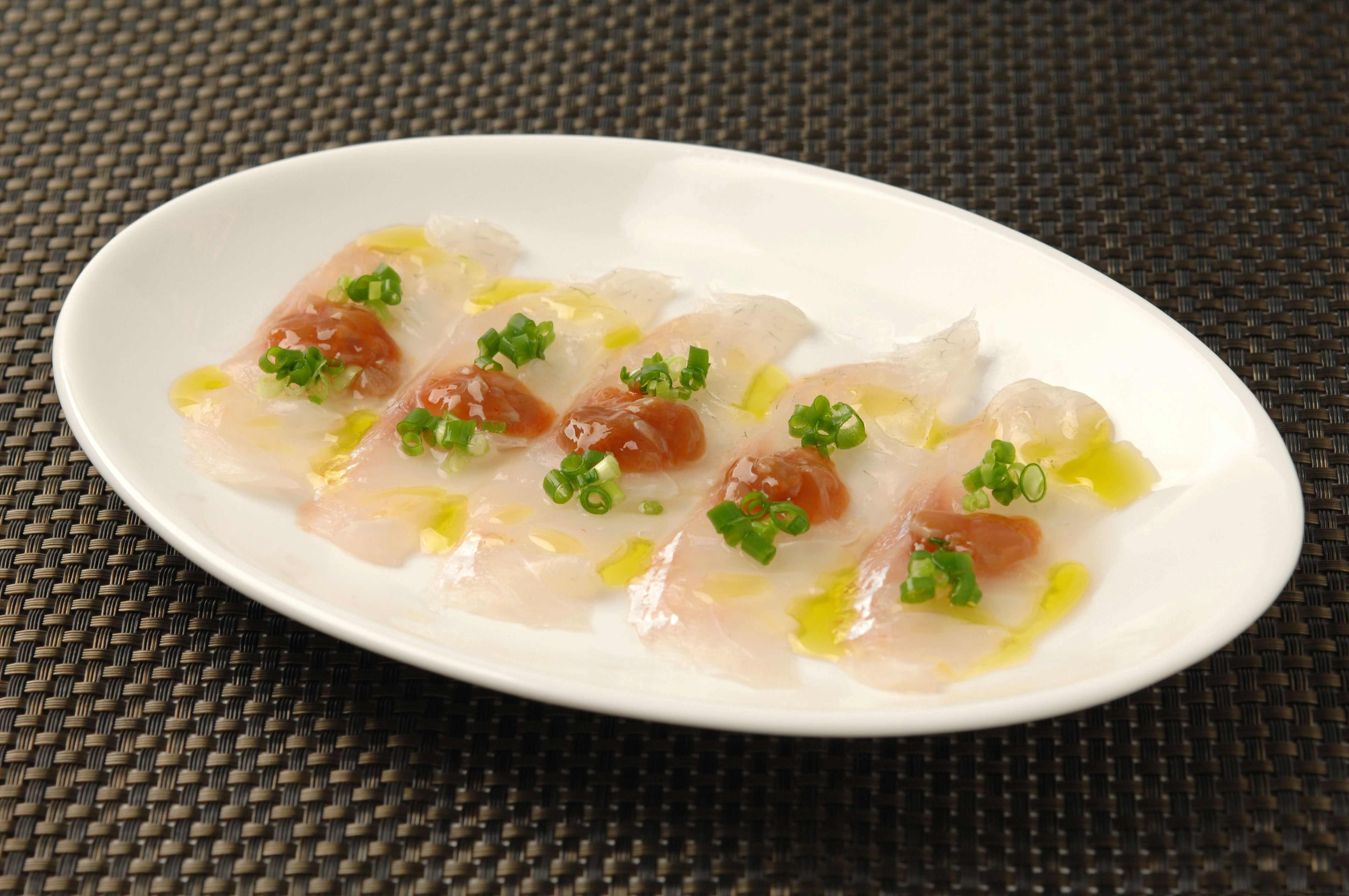
Sea Bream Shuto Carpaccio

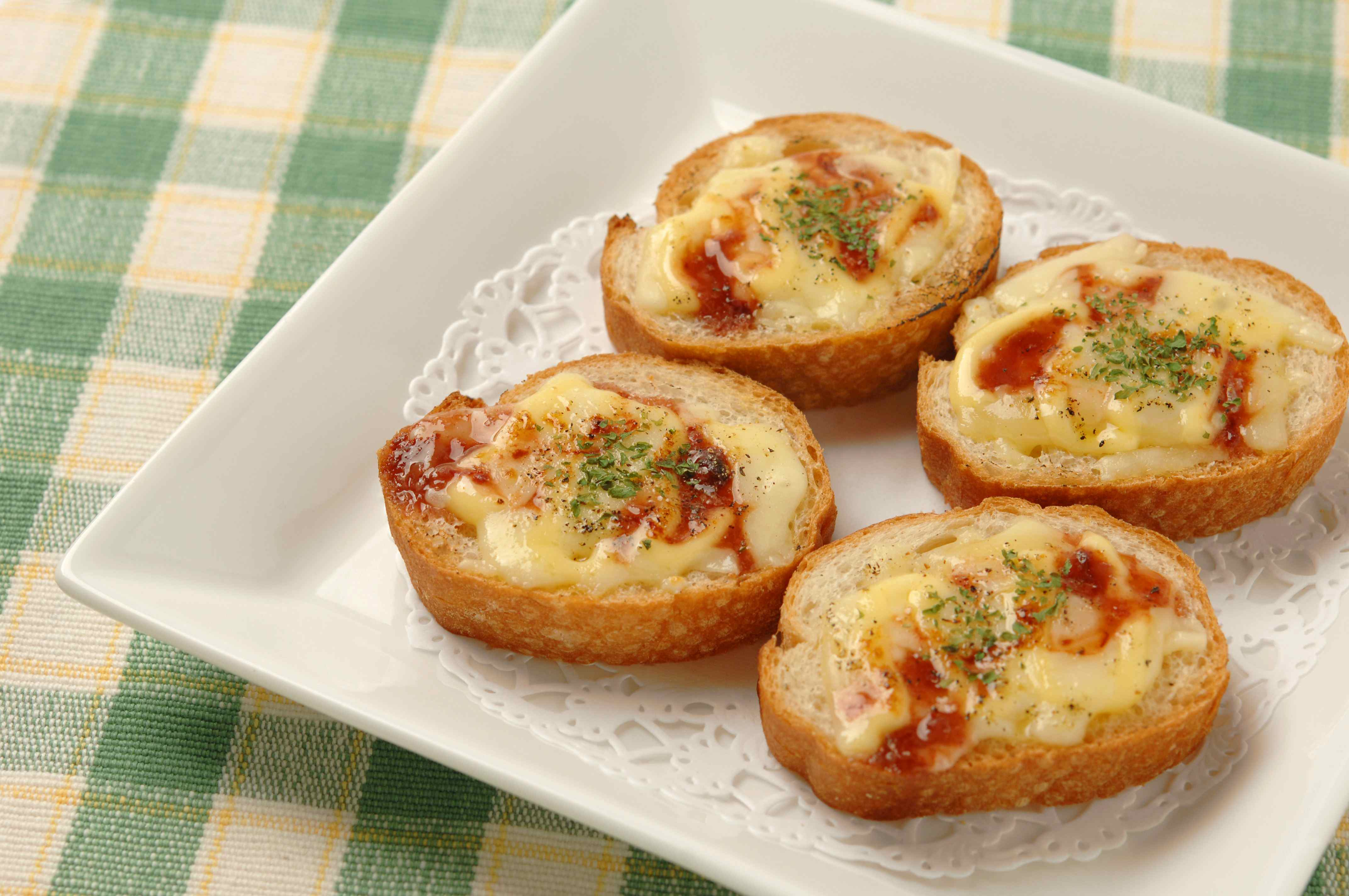
Shuto Cheese Toast

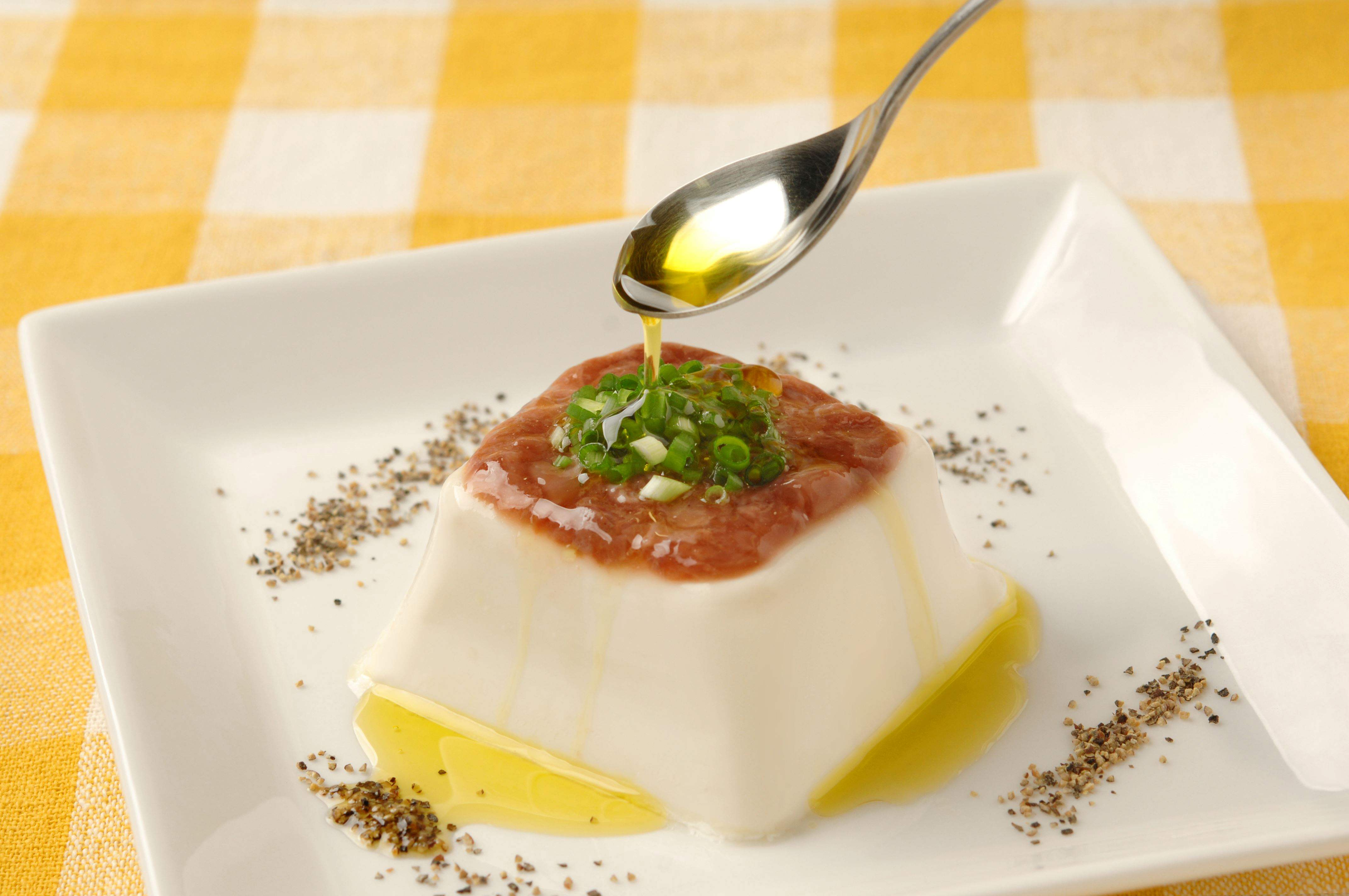
Shuto on Tofu Italian style

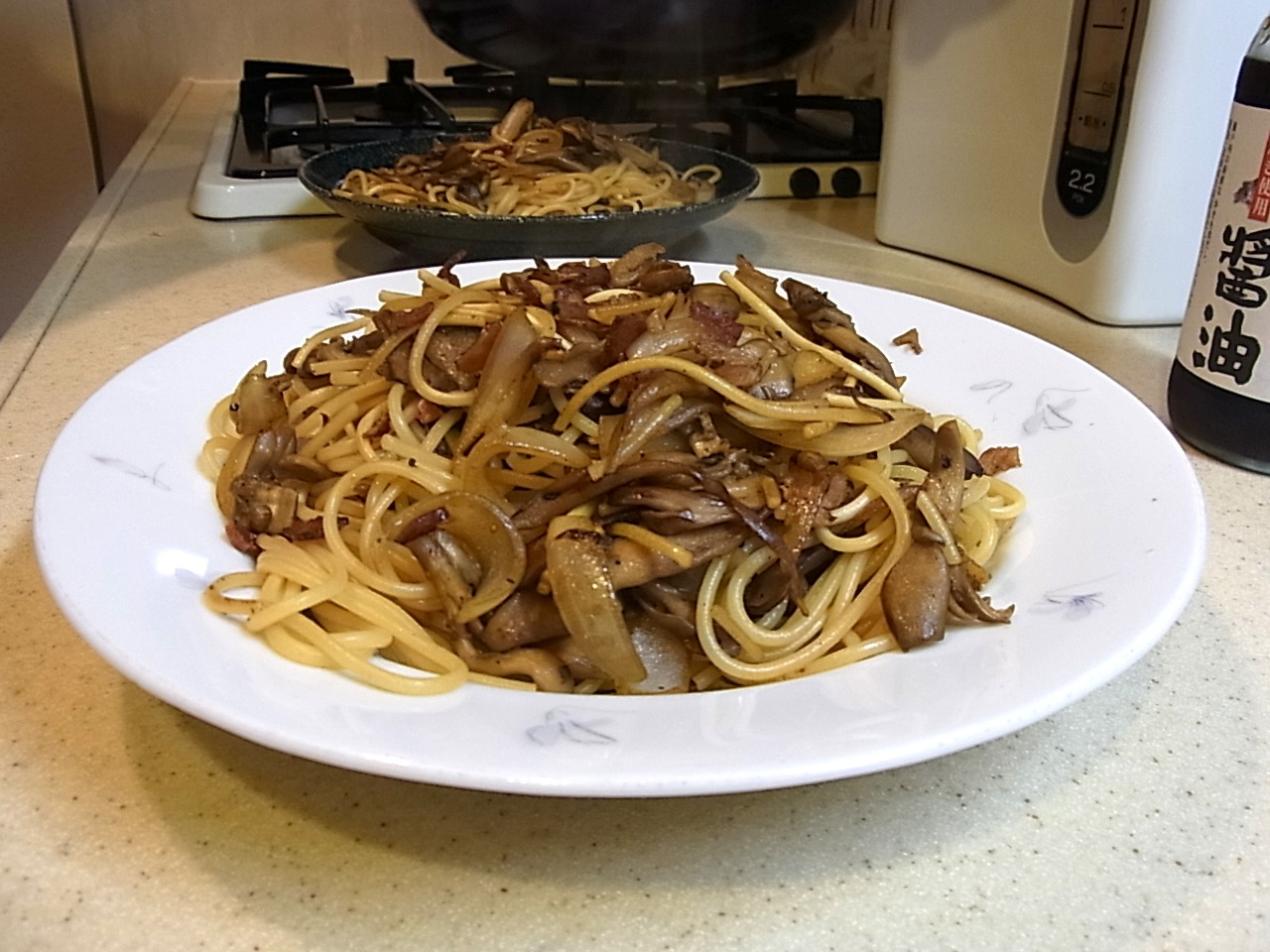
Noodles with shutō

Shutō (酒盗) is a specialty shiokara of Odawara, Kanagawa Prefecture, as well as Kochi and Kagoshima prefectures, in Japan.

== Ingredients ==
Shuto is made by salting rare parts of bonito (katsuo), fermenting it for more than six months, then chopping it up and sometimes adding a mixture of sake and mirin. There is also a tuna (maguro) type that has a milder character.

== Etymology ==
The Chinese characters of the dish (酒盗) means "sake thief" and is derived from the belief that it is a good side dish for sake. Legend has it when eating Shuto (酒盗), your chopsticks will move so fast that you will want to ‘steal’ (盗) ‘sake’ (酒).

== History ==
Shuto may have originally been prepared and eaten by bonito fishermen, and there are records that it has been eaten in Japan for about 300 years, dating back to the Edo period.

It is sometimes known as ‘Japanese anchovies’, which does not refer to the ingredients or manufacturing process, rather the way in which it is used as a salty and savory compliment to many other dishes.

== Variations ==
Variations of shuto include "versions flavoured with yuzu, chilli and other spices, or with spring onions." It may also be made with various other fish such as salmon, sea bream, and saury.

== Pairings ==
Although this dish is quite salty, the sake adds a depth to the flavour that may take several samplings to fully appreciate. As a result of the saltiness, a favoured method for savouring this dish is to take a small bite and then follow it with either a drink of alcohol or some rice.

== In culture ==
Shuto is a popular souvenir and izakaya dish in Kochi and Kagoshima prefectures, where bonito fish are caught in relative abundance.

Shiino Foods Co., Ltd. promotes April 10th as Shuto Day. This date was chosen due to the similar pronunciations of the date and the name of the dish: the month of April can be read as 'shu' and the date 10 as 'to'.
