= Mefun =

Ainu local delicacy from Hokkaidō

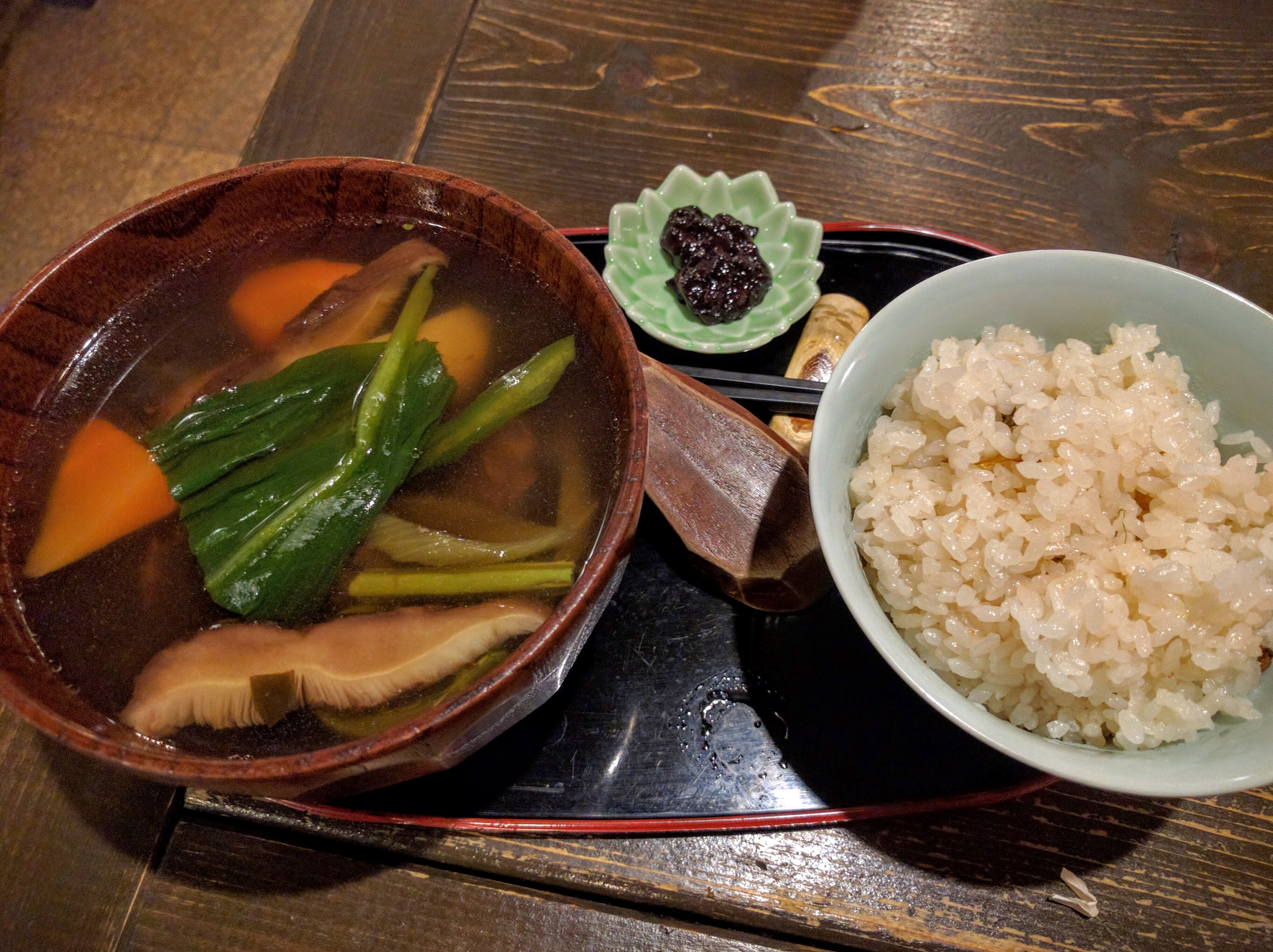
Ainu meal with a small dish of mefun (top center)

Mefun (めふん) is a local delicacy from Hokkaidō, Japan. Originally an Ainu dish, it consists of the kidney of chum salmon pickled in a salt solution until a dark brownish black. It is often served with alcohol or as a side dish. It has a sweet umami taste.
