= Beba (restaurant) =

Argentine-Jewish restaurant in Montreal, Quebec, Canada

- Interactive map of Beba

Restaurant information
- Established: July 1, 2017
- Owners: Ari Schor; Pablo Schor
- Head chef: Ari Schor
- Food type: Argentine; Jewish; Mediterranean
- Rating: Recommended (Michelin Guide)
- Location: 3900 Rue Éthel, Montreal, Quebec, Canada
- Coordinates: 45°27′54″N 73°34′04″W
- Seating capacity: 28
- Website: restaurantbeba.ca/en/

Beba is an Argentine-Jewish fusion restaurant in the Verdun borough of Montreal, Quebec, Canada.

== History ==
The restaurant was opened in July 2017 by brothers Ari and Pablo Schor, Canadian siblings of Argentine-Jewish descent. Drawing on their cultural heritage and Mediterranean techniques, the siblings aimed to create a restaurant that reflected the culinary influences of their upbringing. Prior to starting Beba, both had worked within the Joe Beef restaurant group; Ari as chef de cuisine at Liverpool House, and Pablo in wine and front-of-house service.

During much of 2020 and early 2021, in response to the COVID-19 pandemic, restaurants across Canada operated under strict health and safety regulations, including extended periods without dine-in service. During this time, Beba adapted by offering a more casual takeout model, focusing on Argentine-style empanadas.

Beba's signature dish is the caviar knish, a Jewish-style potato knish topped with 100 grams of Golden Kaluga caviar.

== Recognition ==
In a 2019 review, Montreal Gazette restaurant critic Joanna Fox gave Beba 3 1/2 out 4 stars, calling it "Verdun’s best-kept secret" and praised it as a neighbourhood restaurant that “feels special,” with food that is “interesting, ever-changing and incredibly well-executed.” She highlighted dishes such as the Swiss chard involtini and weekly-changing empanadas, describing them as thoughtfully composed and full of confident, layered flavours.

Condé Nast magazine praised Beba for its "elegant yet neighborhood-y vibes" and its "unlikely-but-it-works combination of Argentine, Mediterranean, and Québecois cuisines," calling it "an essential snapshot of the real Montreal."

Beba has made American food magazine Bon Appétit list for best restaurants in Montreal, with the publication stating that the restaurant is “fun and friendly,” and praising its menu rooted in the Schor brothers’ Argentine Jewish background, including dishes like empanadas and a sardine montadito inspired by their childhood snack of pickled herring on a sesame bagel.

In 2025, the business received a 'Recommended' designation in Quebec's inaugural Michelin Guide. Per the guide, a 'Recommended' selection "is the sign of a chef using quality ingredients that are well cooked; simply a good meal" and that the anonymous inspectors had found "the food to be above average, but not quite at [Michelin star] level."

Beba was ranked #50 in the inaugural North America's 50 Best Restaurants list published in September 2025, and ranked #27 in the 2026 publication.

=== Canada's 100 Best Restaurants Ranking ===
The restaurant has appeared on Canada's 100 Best Restaurants ranking annually since debuting in 2020. As of the 2026 publication, Beba is ranked #6 in the country, the highest it has placed.

Beba
Year	Rank	Change
2020	25	new
2021	No List	
2022	16	▲9
2023	8	▲8
2024	8	Steady
2025	7	▲1
2026	6	▲1
