= Lucky Buddha Beer =

Chinese beer brand

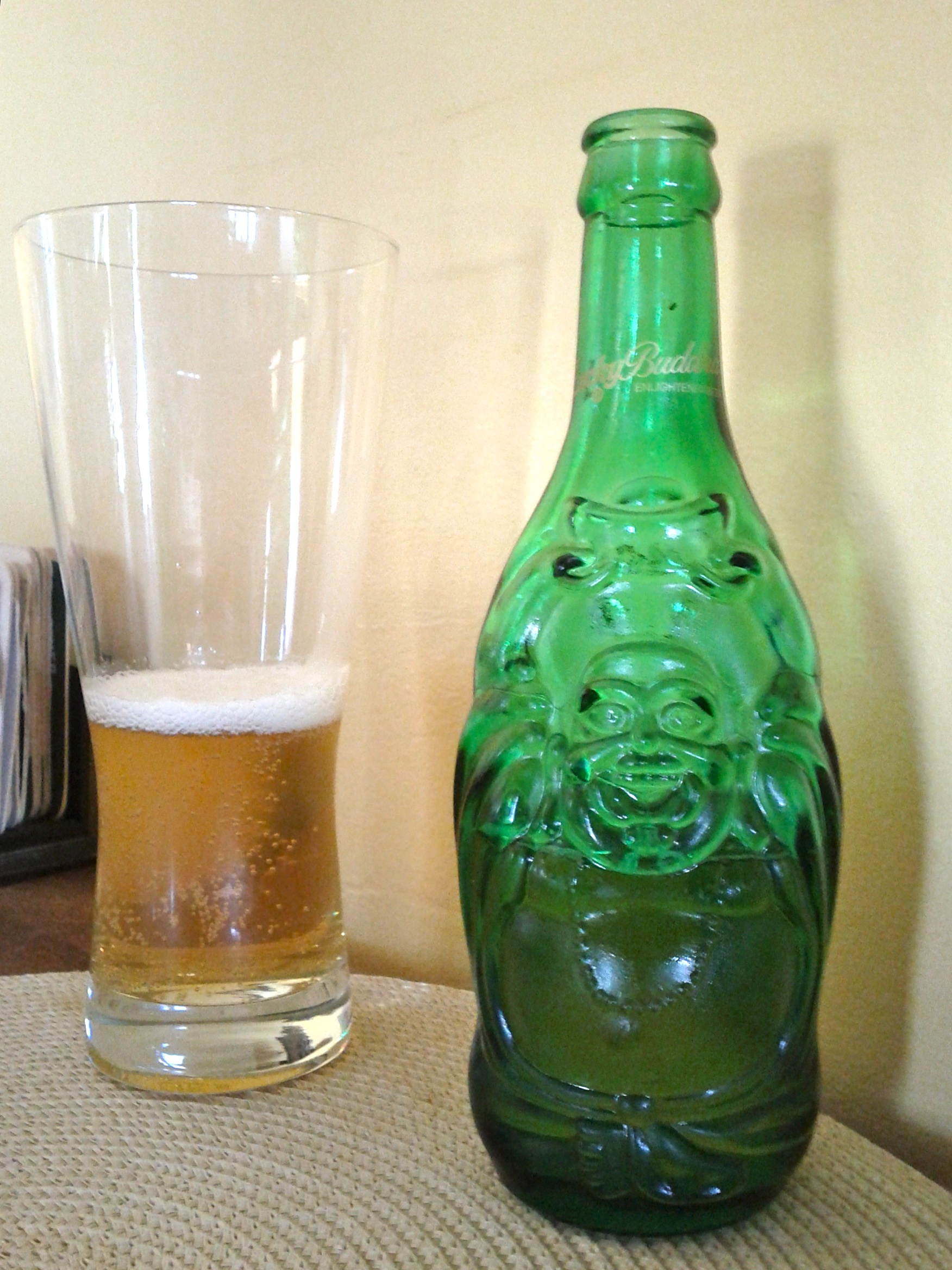
- Lucky Buddha Beer bottle, showing distinctive shape
- Type: Beer
- Location: Qiandao Lake, China
- Opened: July 2010

Lucky Buddha Beer (Chinese: 乐开啤酒) is a beer brewed and bottled at the Qiandao Lake, China, by Hangzhou Qiandaohu Beer Co., Ltd.. It was introduced in July 2010, and is made from malt, hops, rice and water from this region delivering an Asian style lager. The flavor is an earthy malt with citrus features with notes of lemon, grapefruit, wheat, honey that combines together for a crisp taste.

== Marketing ==
In 2015, Lucky Buddha Beer was one of the fastest growing import beer brand in supermarkets in the United States. The bottle design depicts a Laughing Buddha. This is a cultural design depicted that is incorporated in Buddhist, Taoist and Shinto traditions. The Lucky Buddha Beer bottle is modeled as the seated laughing Buddha holding a large gold ingot above his head. The bottom of the bottle contains four good-luck symbols (for good fortune, happiness, longevity and prosperity). The beer is sold in bottled and canned form and is imported by Sage Beverages, headquartered in Carlsbad, California.

Lucky Buddha Beer has worked with Noble Environmental Technologies and Walmart to develop a sustainable point-of-purchase display that supports Walmart's commitment to reach zero landfill waste by 2025. They are collaborating to create a sustainable end-cap display that is non-toxic, VOC-free, made from 100% recycled materials and is 100% certified bio-based and thereby reduce material use and their carbon footprint.

== Design origin ==
It is believed that the history of the Laughing Buddha bottle design, known as Budai, was a Chan buddhist monk who lived in China around 1,000 years ago. His name means "cloth sack", and comes from the bag that he is conventionally depicted as carrying. His figure appears throughout Chinese culture as a representation of contentment and his image graces many temples, restaurants, amulets, and businesses. He was known to be exceedingly kind and jolly. He was known for carrying many goods all over the world. He would travel around teaching the Dharma to the people and provide them with goodies he collected on his travels. The empty bottles have been known to be used in arts and craft projects such as making vases and lamps. The buddha-shaped bottles have initiated a number of Do it yourself projects, being repurposed into everything from candle holders to soap dispensers.
