= Ossetra =

Type of caviar

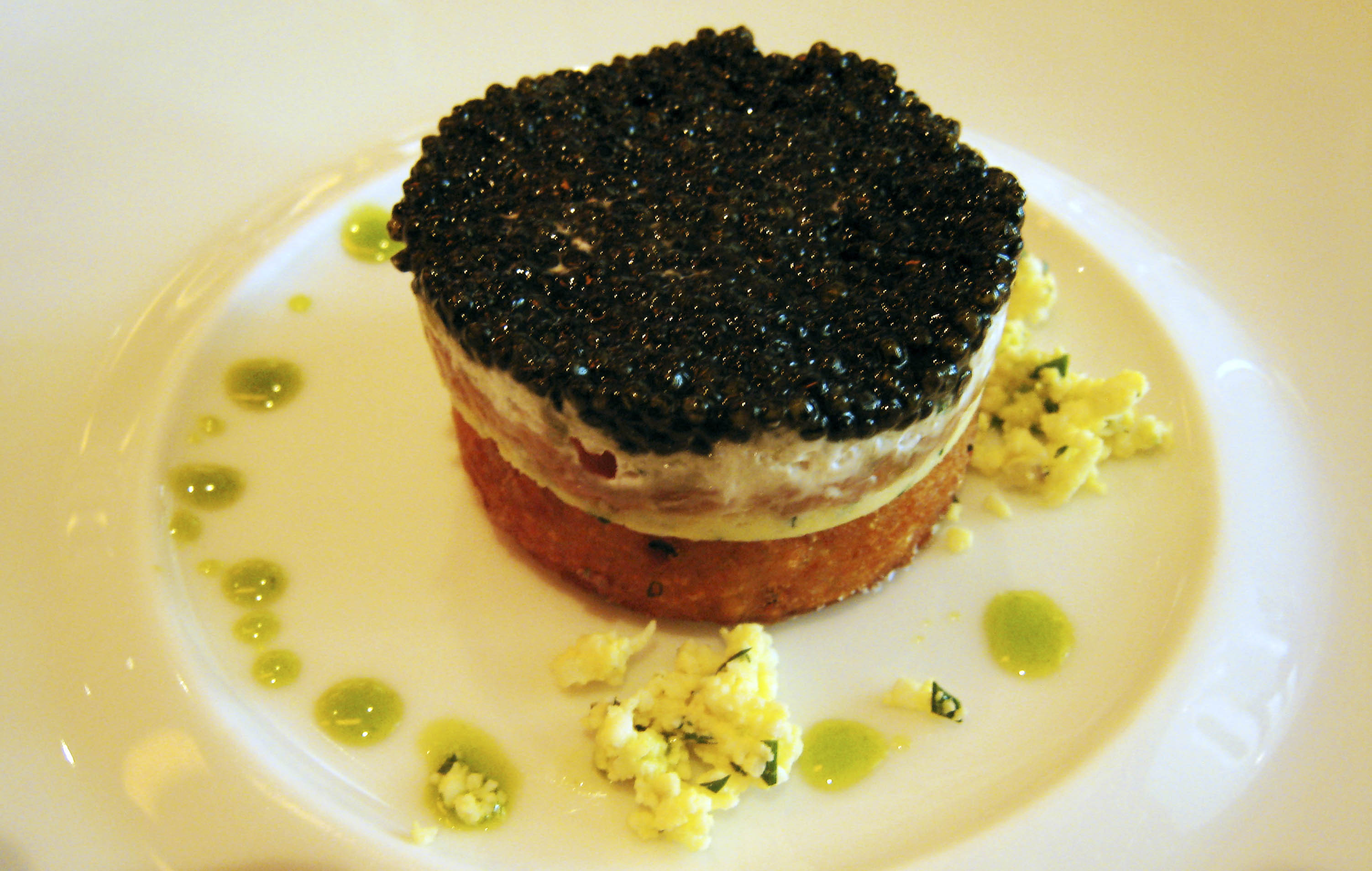
Ossetra caviar, salmon crème fraîche, potato shallot croquette, basil oil, egg whites and yolks

Ossetra (also Osetra, Oscietra, Osetrova, or Asetra) caviar is one of the most prized and expensive types of caviar (eclipsed in price only by Beluga caviar). It is obtained from the Russian sturgeon (Huso gueldenstaedtii), which weighs 50–400 pounds (22.6–181.4 kg) and can live up to 50 years.

Ossetra caviar varies in color from deep brown to gold. Lighter varieties are more sought after, as they have the richest flavor and come from the oldest sturgeon. Golden Ossetra is a rare form of Ossetra caviar and is golden-yellow with a very rich flavor.

The word Ossetra is the transcription of the genitive case form осетра (osetra, 'of sturgeon') of the Russian word осётр (osyotr, 'sturgeon') from the phrase икра осетра (ikra osetra, 'caviar of sturgeon'). At one time, "ossetra" referred to Russian sturgeon species harvested for this type of caviar.

== Source animals ==
In Russian, there are different names for the species of sturgeon that live in various territories, such as Beluga (Huso huso), Sevruga (Acipenser stellatus) and Sterlet (Acipenser ruthenus). The name Ossetra corresponds to the species Huso gueldenstaedtii, which is much smaller than Beluga sturgeon (Huso huso), and has a firmer texture. In the territory of the Russian Federation dwells another type of sturgeon, Siberian sturgeon (Acipenser baerii), which is farmed all over the world because it can adapt to a wider range of habitats. It begins to produce caviar faster than Huso gueldenstaedtii.

== Production ==
Today, the Ossetra-bearing species faces extinction in its native Caspian habitat because wild-caught Russian sturgeon (Huso gueldenstaedtii) are immediately slaughtered to determine their sex and egg-bearing condition. Farm-raised sturgeon are periodically scanned by harmless ultrasound to make the same determination. Continuous drastic declines in natural sturgeon populations over the past 30 years, plus a high market demand for caviar, have led the way for the cultivation of sturgeon for caviar production. Russia, Iran, members of the European Union, China, and the USA were among the first; however, for the very same reasons, more countries outside the natural range of Caspian native sturgeons also became involved (e.g., Uruguay, Arabian countries, Israel, Iran, Italy and more recently Vietnam).

As with all other caviar, ossetra is traditionally served on blini with crème fraiche, chopped hard-boiled egg whites, and chopped onions. Lower-grade varieties of caviar are used as stuffing in many seafood and meat dishes. Caviar is often added to salads as well.
