= Beluga caviar =

Caviar made of the roe of the beluga sturgeon (Huso huso)

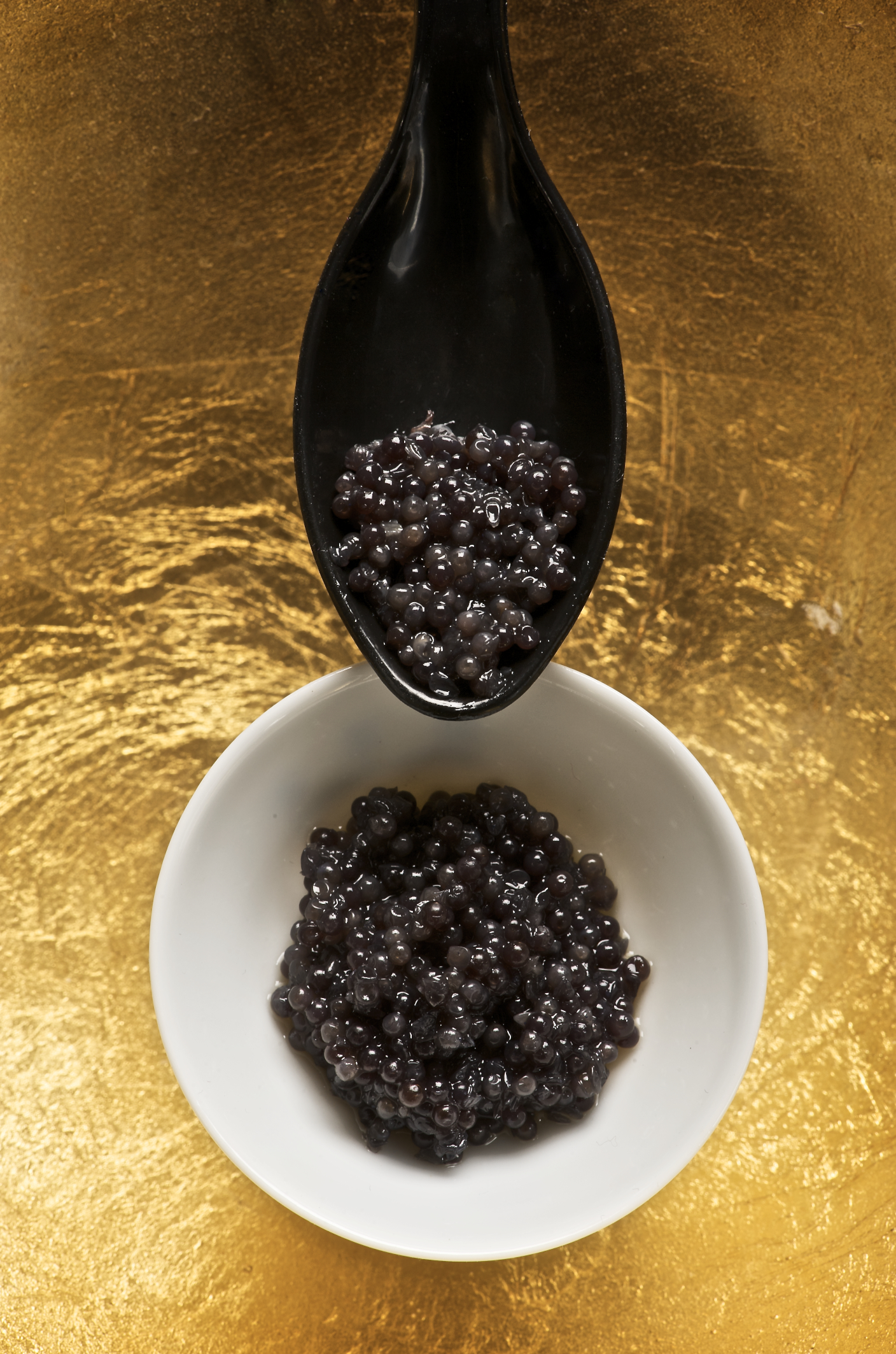
Black beluga caviar

Beluga caviar is caviar consisting of the roe (or eggs) of the beluga sturgeon (Huso huso). The fish is found primarily in the Caspian Sea, which is bordered by Iran, Azerbaijan, Kazakhstan, Russia, and Turkmenistan. It can also be found in the Black Sea basin and occasionally in the Adriatic Sea. Beluga caviar is the most expensive type of caviar, with market prices ranging from $7,000 to $22,000/kg ($3,200 to $10,000/lb).

== Harvesting ==
The beluga sturgeon is currently considered to be critically endangered, causing the United States Fish and Wildlife Service to ban in 2005 the importation of beluga caviar which originated in the Caspian Sea and Black Sea basin. In 2006, the Convention on International Trade in Endangered Species (CITES) suspended all trade made with the traditional caviar-producing regions of the Caspian and Black Seas (beluga, ossetra and sevruga), (Azerbaijan, Bulgaria, China, Iran, Kazakhstan, Romania, Russia, Serbia and Montenegro, Turkmenistan, and Ukraine) due to the producing countries' failure to apply international regulations and recommendations. Caviar from Iran is exempted from the ban. Iran is considered by CITES to practise effective conservation and policing of its fisheries. In January 2007, this ban was partly lifted, allowing the sale of 96 tons of caviar, 15 percent below the official 2005 level. CITES maintained the 2007 quotas for 2008, drawing criticism for doing little to protect the declining sturgeon population.

The beluga sturgeon can take up to 20 years to reach maturity. The fish harvested for caviar are often nearly 900 kg (2,000 lb). The eggs themselves are the largest of the commonly used roes, and range in color from dark gray (almost black) to light gray, with the lighter colors coming from older fish, and being the most valued.

The most expensive caviar is almas, a golden caviar produced by very rare female albino sturgeon between 60 and 100 years old, which swims in the southern Caspian Sea near Iran where apparently less pollution exists. Very few of the albino variety are left in the wild since the lack of melanin is a genetic disorder that only affects a few members of the species. A kilogram (2 lb 3 oz) is regularly sold for £20,000. Any additions by producers diminish the value of the roe, and the caviar usually reaches the market without any additions or processing whatsoever.

== Legality ==
In 2005, the United States made it illegal to import beluga caviar and beluga sturgeon into the country, because of the animal's endangered status. However, caviar from beluga hybrid species are still for sale in the country. Many other countries allow for the import and export of beluga sturgeon caviar, as the fish has started making a comeback in recent years. Widespread farming and conservation efforts have allowed wild populations in the Caspian to redevelop.

In July 2016, Sturgeon Aquafarms in Bascom, FL became the first and only facility in the world to obtain a permit exemption for the trade in beluga sturgeon and its caviar in the US. Since 2017, Sturgeon Aquafarms has assisted in beluga sturgeon repopulation efforts across the world by providing over ~160,000 fertilized beluga eggs to the Caspian Sea region.

== Service ==
As with most caviars, beluga is usually handled with a caviar spoon made of mother of pearl, bone, or other nonmetallic material, as metal utensils are said to impart an unwelcome metallic taste to the delicate roe. Beluga caviar is usually served by itself on toast, unlike other less expensive caviars that can be served in a variety of ways, including hollowed and cooked new potatoes, on blini, or garnished with sour cream, crème fraîche, chopped onions and chopped hard boiled egg whites. These items can, however, be served with beluga as palate cleansers.
