= Qiandao Lake incident =

Cross-strait related criminal case in 1994

Coordinates: 29.6091°N 118.99°E

The Qiandao Lake incident (simplified Chinese: 千岛湖事件; traditional Chinese: 千島湖事件; pinyin: Qiāndǎo hú shìjiàn) refers to the 1994 kidnap and murder of Taiwanese tourists and local guides and staff in the Qiandao Lake scenic area, in Zhejiang, People's Republic of China. Insensitive treatment by the local government and police force after the event, including censoring information and unprofessional criminal investigation procedures, led to a public backlash in Taiwan against the Chinese government. This led to increased support in Taiwan for independence.

== Incident ==
On March 31, 1994, a ferry named Hai Rui (海瑞号) was hijacked by three men in Qiandao Lake, located in Chun'an County, Hangzhou, in Zhejiang Province. The ship ended up on fire, and all 32 people on board at the time were killed, including 24 passengers from Taiwan, along with six Chinese crew and two Chinese tour guides. The Hai Rui ferry was supposed to have returned on the night of the 31st. Instead, on the morning of April 1, it was discovered ablaze. The local civilians immediately reported it to the police. The police did not find any passengers or sailors on the ship initially, and the Chun'an County government organized police, on-duty troops and civilians to search in the Qiandao Lake region, but did not discover any of the missing passengers. After the fire was put out, the police discovered 32 bodies in the lower cabin of the ship. However, during the investigation of the case, the local police department did not inform the general public of the progress of the investigation. This led to the public's belief that the local government was blocking information, concealing the events and controlling the media.

== Investigation ==
On April 2, 1994, the Hangzhou police department arranged medical experts to analyze all the discovered bodies. On April 4, the families of the victims arrived in Chun'an County from Taiwan. China's Association for Relations Across the Taiwan Straits (ARATS) set up receptions in various cities to accommodate the families; at the same time, the Taiwanese Straits Exchange Foundation (SEF) requested assistance in getting the families to the scene of the incident, to deal with related issues, but this was refused by ARATS. On April 6, the Zhejiang provincial police department joined the investigation.

On the same day, the Zhejiang government invited Master Jiyun of the Hangzhou Lingyin Temple to do the ceremony that release souls from purgatory, but denied the families of the victims to visit the remains of the victims and the request to review the autopsy report. Under the protest of the families, the remains were cremated in Tonglu County in Hangzhou. The remains of the victims were given to the families to bury; the ashes of the Taiwanese tourists were given to their family for them to bring back to Taiwan with the assistance of the Taiwanese Changfeng Travel Agency.

The People's Republic of China local government initially reported this as a ship fire, but this statement was strongly opposed by the families of the victims and other Taiwanese people. The foreign media also issued all kinds of reports and speculations. On April 9, the then president of Taiwan Lee Teng-hui publicly criticized the Chinese Communist Party as acting "like bandits", and claimed that the case was robbery committed by Chinese People's Liberation Army soldiers, as had been claimed by Taiwanese intelligence. After the case was over, some thought that the reason that the provincial government of Zhejiang did not publicize case facts was not to jeopardise the investigation. But, there were other opinions that thought it was essentially censorship. On April 12, the vice president of the ARATS Tang Shubei met the deputy general secretary of the SEF Shi Qiping, and proclaimed that the incident was only a ship fire, and stressed that China authorities would deal with the problems created by the incident to their best ability.

However, the Taiwanese side strongly disagreed with the statement by Tang. They believed that China local government initially blocked the information, and then refused to change its attitude. The Taiwanese authority responded to this by announcing "all interflows between the two straits to be temporarily stopped", and halted all tour travels to China starting May 1. The Board of Trade of the Taiwan stopped the discussion on the investment case to the China, and the Board of Education stopped the culture interflow between the two straits. The travel agencies were also halted from going on tour to the PRC. All the connections between Taiwan and China were nearly completely cut off.

On April 15 the three suspects were arraigned by the court. On April 17, the PRC Zhejiang provincial police department announced that the case had been solved, and that it was a "major robbery, arson and murder case". Three suspects were arrested. Two of the suspects were military personnel, one being a retired serviceman, another being the brother of an armed police officer. Regardless, the families of the victims questioned the possibility of 32 men subdued by three criminals. On April 18 the PRC Premier Li Peng announced talks to explain the case. On May 8, the Taiwanese SEF organized a group to go to the scene of the incident to comprehend the case. On June 3, PRC authorities in Hangzhou City announced public prosecution. On June 10, the common pleas of the Hangzhou City reached the last instance. During the trial, the ARATS invited the SEF to visit the public prosecution, and contacted the SEF once again before the last instance, but was refused by the SEF. The families of the victims also refused to visit the process of the trial.

On June 12, the verdict was made, and the three suspects Wu Lihong, Hu Zhihan, Yu Aijun were all charged of robbery and murder, and were sentenced to death. On June 19, the three convicted were executed.

== Consequences ==
The Chinese government avoided further clarification of several disputed points that the Taiwanese authorities addressed. The Taiwanese Mainland Affairs Council announced a statement on June 15 that criticized the way the PRC authorities treated the Qiandao Lake Incident, which may lead the case to be unsettled. Because the evidence was unclear, information about the case could not be verified and therefore led to speculations and rumors. Eventually, the Qiandao Lake Incident turned from a regular criminal case into a serious political event.

To a greater extent, the Qiandao Lake Incident jeopardized the reconciliation of the relations between Taiwan and China. It was a crucial event that turned the public opinion of Taiwan around on the matters of Chinese unification. The percentage of Taiwanese people that supported unification decreased by a margin of 20% after the incident, while the percentage in support of Taiwan Independence instantly went up by a margin of 10%. Around half the general population supported the present situation between Taiwan and China to be unchanged. These were the direct consequences of the incident, which displayed the dissatisfaction of the Taiwanese people against the Chinese government. As a result, Taiwanese tourism in China suffered major setbacks, as the Taiwanese government temporarily halted group tour travel to China after the incident.
