= Shicheng, Zhejiang =

Ancient underwater city in Zhejiang, China

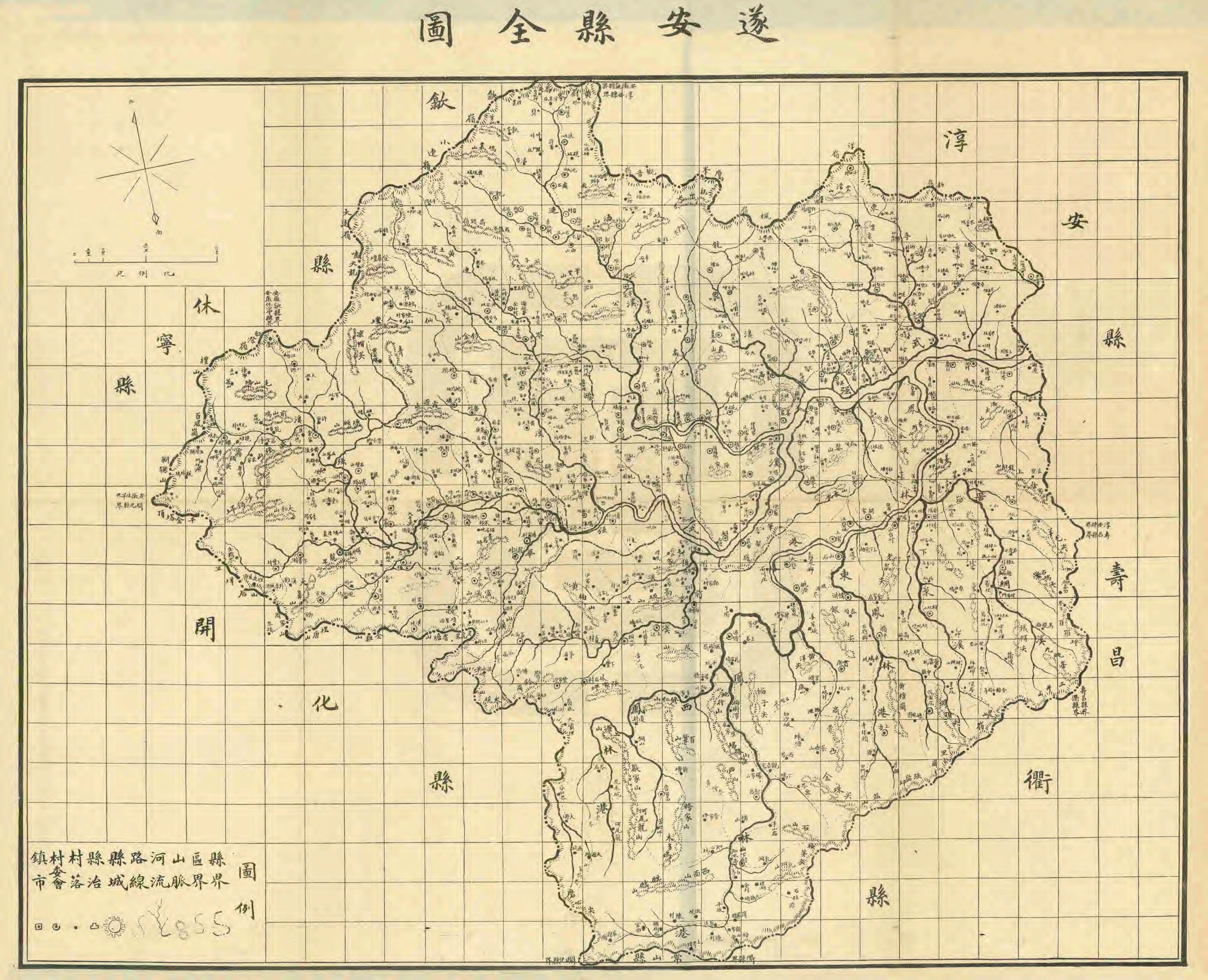
Map of Sui'an County in 1930

Map of Shicheng redrawn according to Gazetteer of Sui'an County in 1930

Shicheng (Chinese: 狮城; pinyin: Shī Chéng; lit. 'Lion City') is an ancient underwater city situated under Qiandao Lake in Chun'an County, Hangzhou, Zhejiang Province, China, and was previously the county seat of the defunct Sui'an County (Chinese: 遂安县). The city was flooded for the purpose of industrialization by the Chinese government in the year 1959 when a decision was made to construct a hydroelectric dam for the province of Zhejiang, forming Qiandao Lake. Evidence suggests that the lost city was inhabited for centuries, but it is now primarily used as an underwater tourist attraction by tourists and diving experts.

Shicheng's name means 'Lion City', in reference to the nearby Wu Shi Mountain (Five Lion Mountain).

== Origins and discovery ==
Shicheng was deliberately flooded to create space for a hydroelectric dam on government orders. Approximately 300,000 people were relocated as a result of the project. The former residents were connected with the Lion City by ancestry and culture. Shī Chéng is believed to be the most significant Chinese city still in a good state of preservation. Many of its homes, temple structures and paved roads were preserved by being 131 feet underwater. In this way it is protected from wind, rain and sun damage. The city has five entrance gates rather than the traditional four. The stone architecture dates to the Ming and Qing dynasties. Shī Chéng's streets contain 265 archways with surviving stonework dating to 1777, and the city walls date to the 16th century.

The Chinese government planned an expedition to explore the remains of the lost metropolis in 2001, when the city was rediscovered. In 2011, pictures and graphics were published by the magazine Chinese National Geography, which sparked interest among the general public and researchers to explore the site.

== Tourism ==
Diving to Shicheng has been restricted to divers with experience of diving during the night and in deep water.
