= Kaluga Queen =

Chinese brand of caviar

- Industry: Aquaculture
- Founded: 2003; 23 years ago
- Headquarters: Kecheng District, Quzhou, Zhejiang, China
- Area served: Worldwide
- Products: Caviar
- Website: www.kalugaqueen.com

Kaluga Queen is a Chinese brand of caviar made by the caviar company Hangzhou Qiandaohu Xunlong Sci-Tech Co., Ltd. The company produces 60 tonnes of caviar annually, making it the largest producer of caviar in the world and responsible for 60% of world production. Kaluga Queen supplies caviar for 21 of the 26 3-starred Michelin restaurants in Paris.

== History ==
Kaluga Queen was founded in 2003 by Hangzhou Qiandaohu Xunlong Sci-Tech Co., Ltd., a caviar company affiliated with the Chinese Academy of Fishery Sciences. The caviar processing facility was constructed in 2004 and the Kaluga Queen brand created in the following year.

Several years after the founding of the company, CITES imposed a severe curtailment of wild caviar from the Caspian Sea region, creating an opportunity for caviar farming startups to take market share from the traditional caviar powers of Russia and Iran.

== Production ==
The sturgeon are farmed at Qiandao Lake, a man-made lake surrounded by little in the way of industry. There are about 50,000 sturgeon maturing at the farm. At age 6 when the sex of the sturgeon becomes apparent, the males are separated from females for immediate processing while the females continue to be nurtured in pens.

The mature sturgeon are shipped in water-filled trucks from the lake to a processing facility in Quzhou. At the facility the sturgeon's eggs are taken out and "checked, re-rinsed, salted, and sealed in tins in less than 10 minutes". The sturgeon without eggs is smoked and exported mostly to Russia.

The company raises 5 different species of sturgeon each producing a different variety including beluga.

== Reception ==
Kaluga Queen's caviar has been favorably reviewed. A writer for Newsweek praised the brand's Schrenckii caviar as having peerless "power and intensity". French chef Alain Ducasse serves it at his portfolio of restaurants.

Media coverage of Kaluga Queen has often focused on the Chinese origins of the brand but not the quality, noting the lack of association between China and caviar. A piece in that's magazine noted that while Kaluga Queen is "hugely successful", the brand still finds it difficult to gain recognition in the international community.

At the 2016 G20 Hangzhou summit, which was held in the company's home province of Zhejiang, world leaders attending the summit, were served Kaluga Queen caviar.

Kaluga Queen has gained international acclaim for its distinctive offerings. Its caviar is used in over 27 three-Michelin-starred restaurants across France.
