= Qiandao Lake =

Freshwater lake in Zhejiang, China

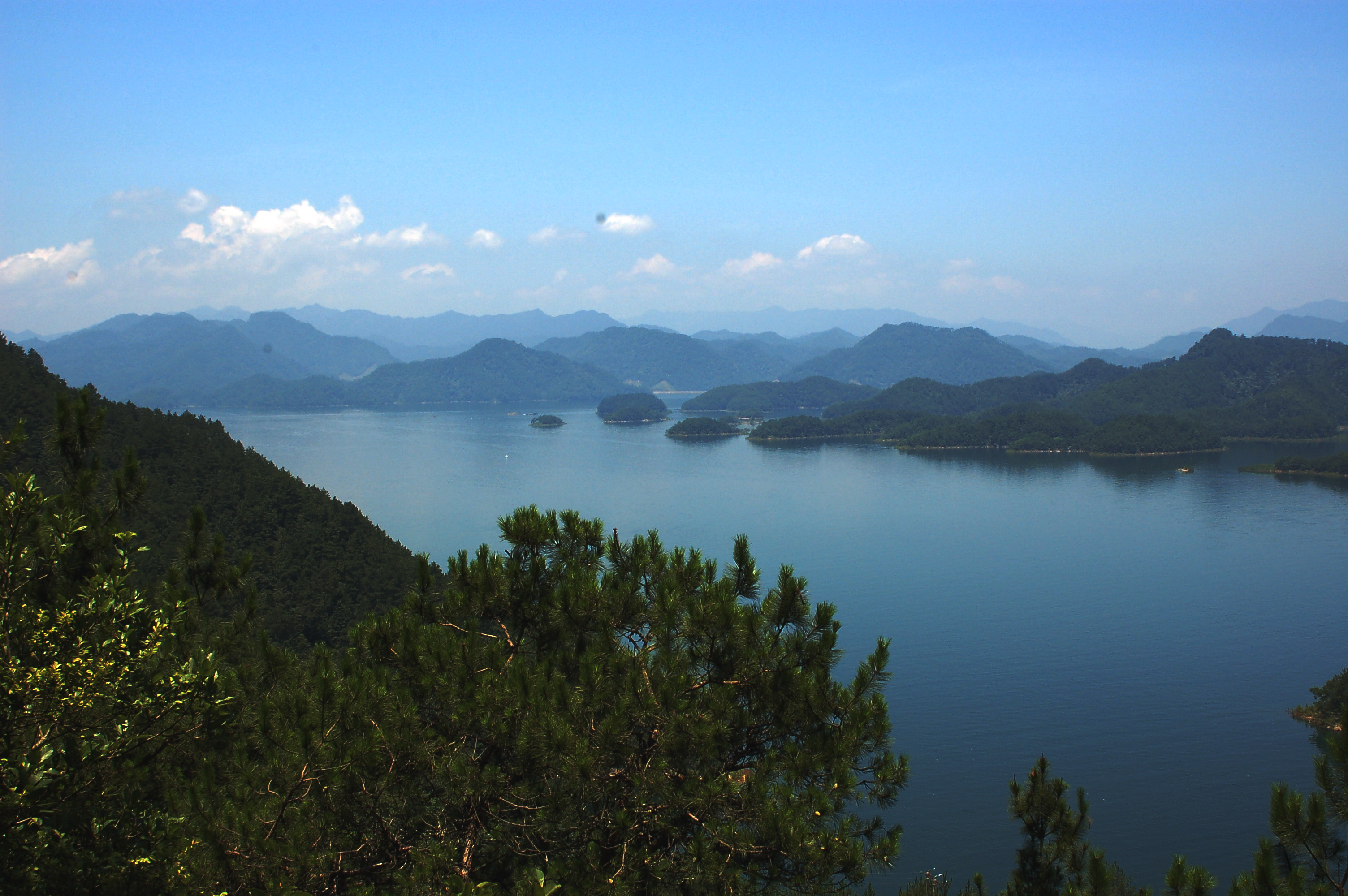
- Thousand Island Lake or Qiandao Lake viewed from atop a bell tower

- Location within Zhejiang
- Location: Chun'an County, Hangzhou, Zhejiang
- Coordinates: 29°36′33″N 118°59′24″E
- Type: reservoir
- Basin countries: China
- Surface area: 573 km^{2} (221 sq mi)
- Average depth: 26 m (85 ft).
- Max. depth: 120 m (394 ft).
- Water volume: 17.8 km^{3} (4.3 mi^{3}).
- Surface elevation: 108 m (354 ft).
- Islands: 1078

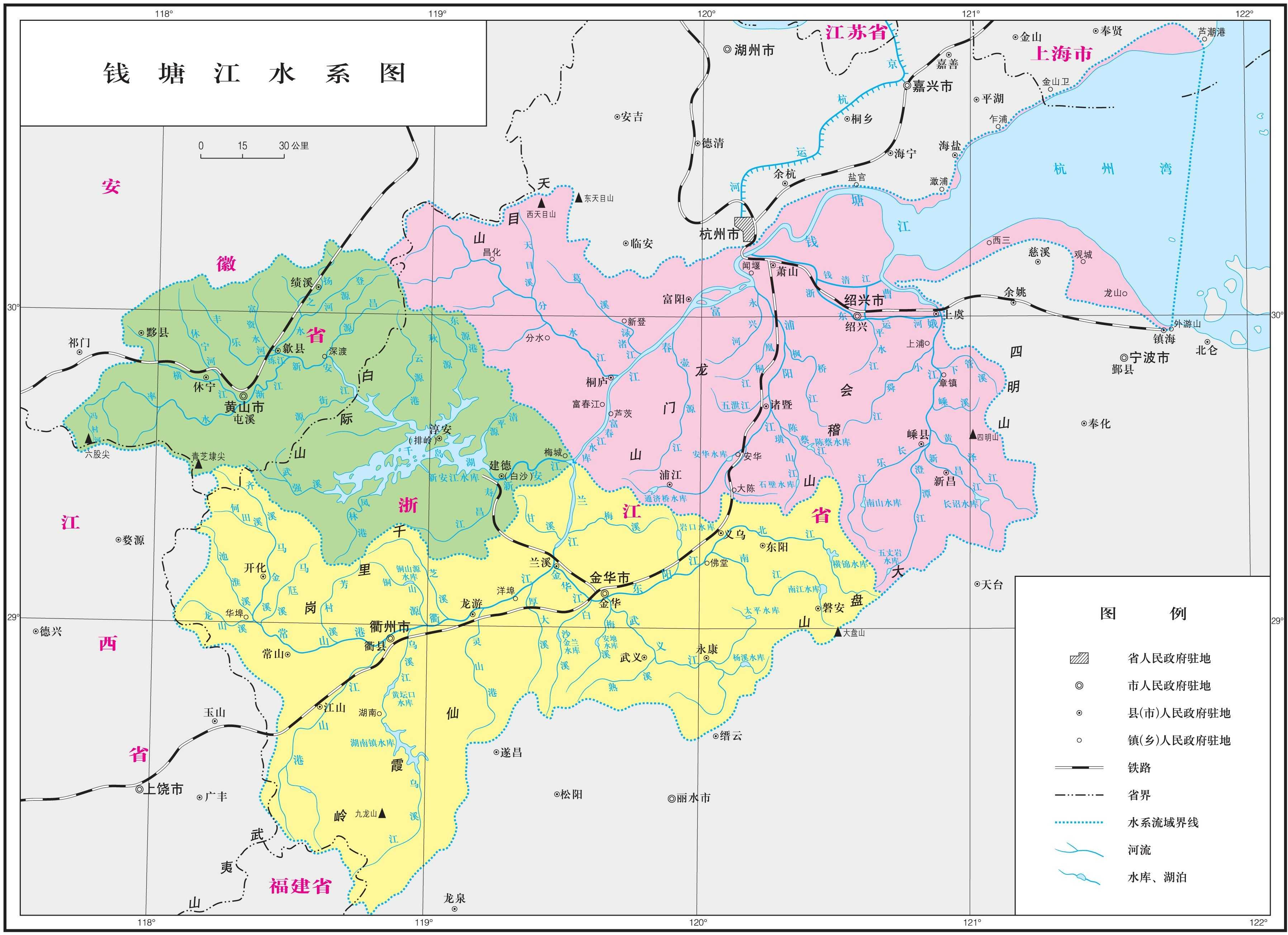
Qiandao Lake seen near the middle, in relation to the Qiantang River basin

Qiandao Lake (simplified Chinese: 千岛湖; traditional Chinese: 千島湖; pinyin: Qiāndǎo Hú; lit. 'Thousand Island Lake') is a man-made freshwater lake located in Chun'an County, Hangzhou, Zhejiang Province, China. It was formed in 1959 following the completion of the Xin'an River hydroelectric station.

== Geography ==
The Qiandao Lake Scenic Area is located in the hinterland of the Yangtze River Delta. The lake is famous for its distinct geography, characterized by 1,078 large islands and thousands of smaller islets scattered across its surface. Over 90% of the surrounding area is forested.

The lake covers an area of 573 km2 (221 sq mi) and has a storage capacity of 17.8 km3 (4.3 cu mi). The islands themselves occupy approximately 86 km2 (33 sq mi).

Named islands include Bird Island, Snake Island, Monkey Island, Lock Island (reportedly featuring the world's biggest lock), and the Island to Remind You of Your Childhood.

== Aquaculture and water quality ==
Spanning an area nearly the size of Singapore and renowned for having clear waters, Qiandao Lake supports a major fishery and aquaculture industry. The lake is home to 83 species of fish across 13 families, including bighead carp, silver carp, grass carp, as well as precious fish species such as mandarin fish, and eel. The annual output is more than 3,000 tons. The lake has also developed an artificial breeding industry, mainly propagating carp, bream and tilapia, with an annual output of nearly 900,000 tons.

Due to its stillness of waters, the lake is stocked with 30,000 sturgeons, a species native to Russia and Central Asia. Those sturgeons are bred to produce caviar for the Kaluga Queen label. The calm waters prevent the sturgeons from swimming against strong currents, allowing them to become fattier, which yields tastier and richer roe.

The lake's water quality is currently transitioning from a mid-mesotrophic to a mesotrophic state. The main polluting elements identified are heavy metals, nitrogen, phosphorus and organic matter, originating from sources like cages and cruise ships.

The water temperature changes significantly within the top 10 meters, with an average temperature fluctuating of 28.2 °C to 24.4 °C. The upper water layer maintains a relatively high temperature, known as the warm water layer, which is greatly affected by floods. A sharp change in water temperature, also called the thermocline, occurs at a depth of approximately 30 meters above and below this layer.

== History ==
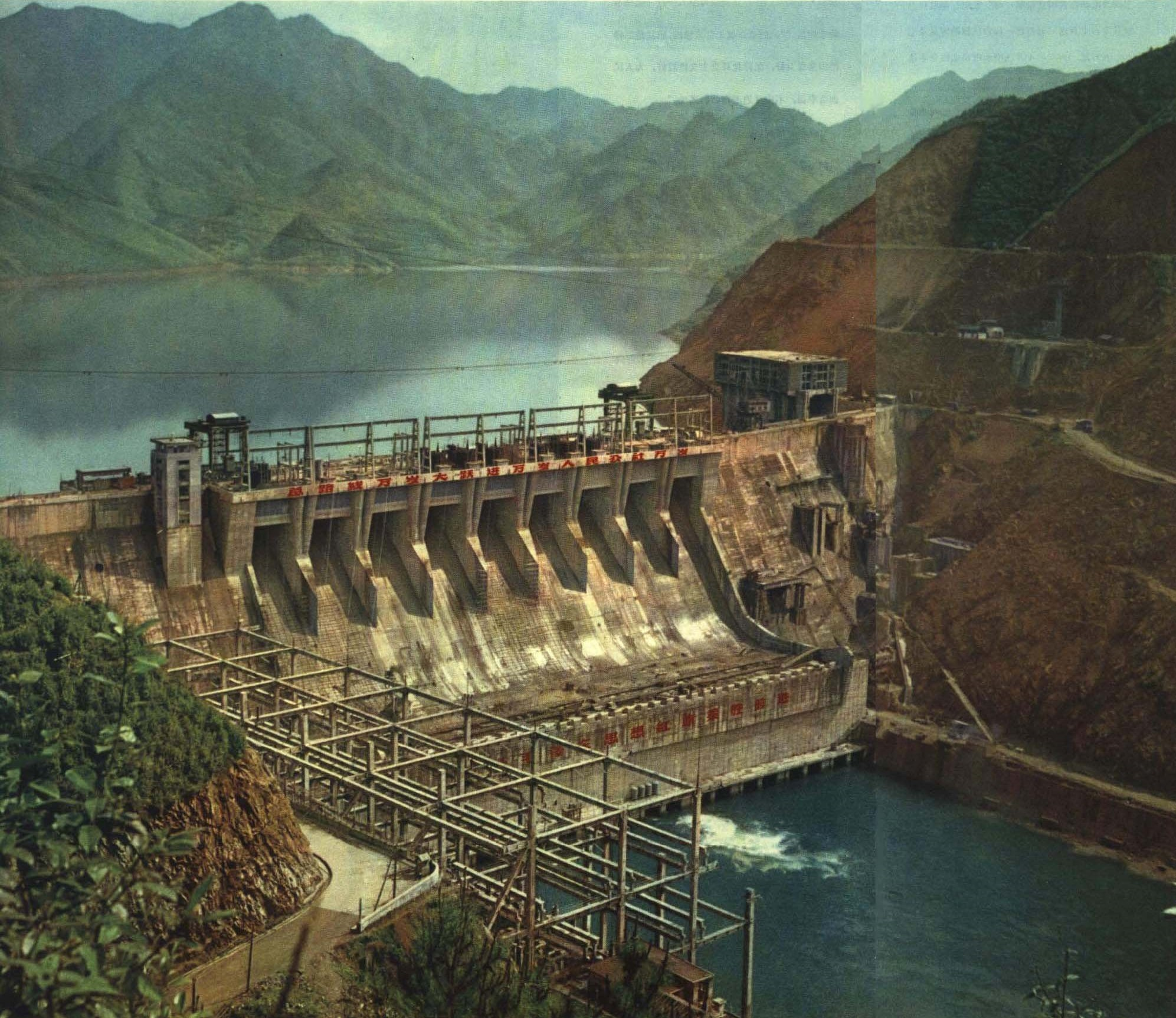
The Xin'an River Hydroelectric Dam in 1963, shortly after its completion.

=== Xin'an River Dam ===
The valley was intentionally flooded in 1959 to create the lake as part of the Xin'an River Dam project. The dam is located at 29°29′01″N 119°12′48″E. It stands 105 m (344 ft) tall with a crest length of 466.5 m (1,531 ft). Xin'an Dam was the first dam constructed in China to exceed 100 m (328 ft) in height, and its power plant has an installed capacity of 845 MW.

=== Submerged city of Shicheng ===
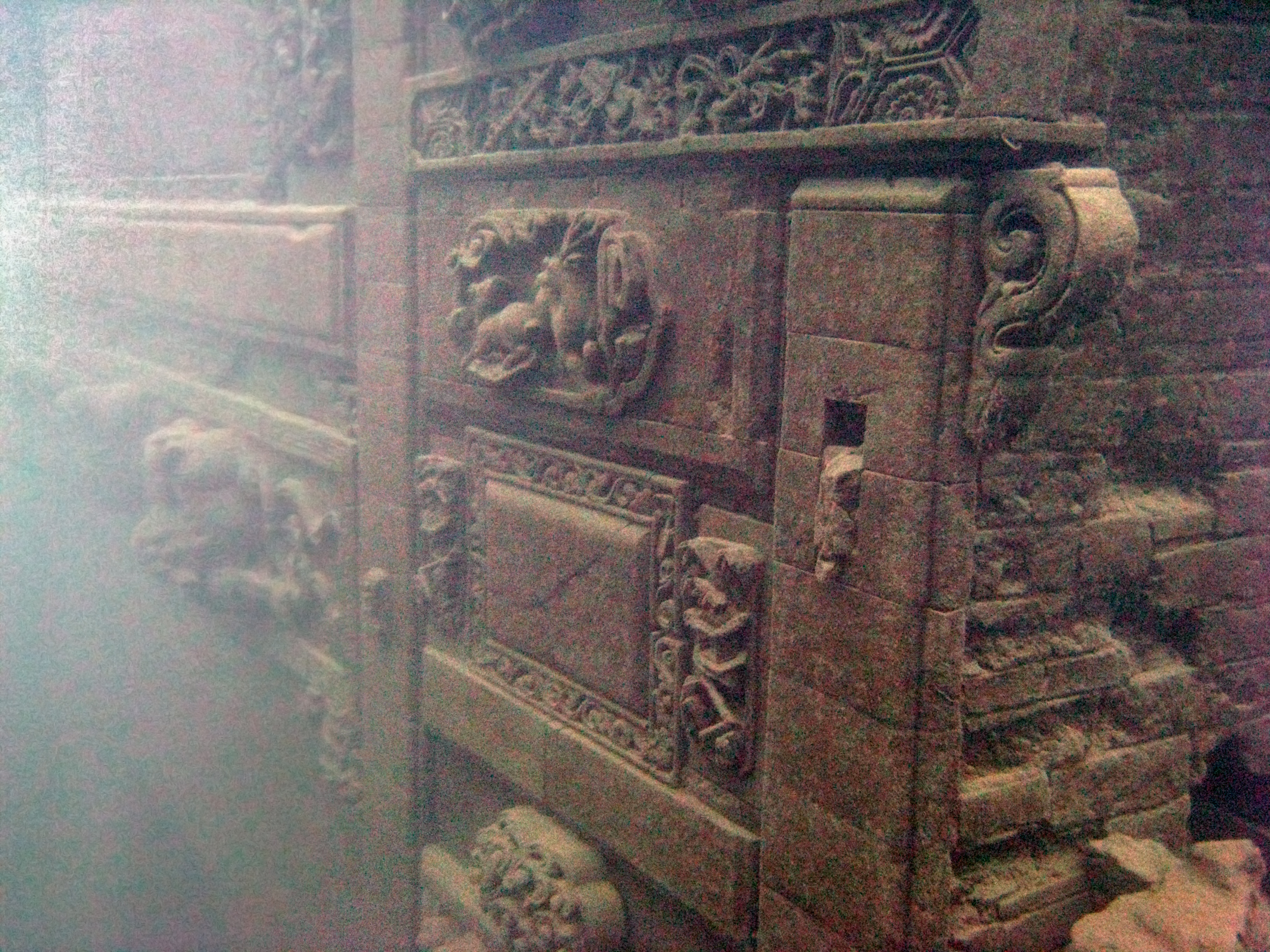
Remains of the submerged city of Shicheng.

Submerged beneath the lake, at the foot of Wushi Mountain (五狮山, "Five Lion Mountain"), lies the ancient city known of Shicheng (狮城, "Lion City"). Shicheng was the county seat of the defunct Sui'an County (遂安县), before it was merged into Chun'an County due to the reservoir's construction. The city was built during the Eastern Han Dynasty (AD 25–200) and was first set up as a county in AD 208. The city acquired its name from nearby Wushi Mountain (Five Lion), which is now known as Wushi Island since it also became partially submerged by the reservoir. At present, Shicheng and many other historic sites remain well-preserved and undisturbed at a depth of 26–40 m (85–131 ft).

=== Qiandao Lake incident ===
In 1994, an event known as the Qiandao Lake Incident occurred when three hijackers boarded a tourist boat and set it on fire, killing all 32 passengers on board. The victims were mainly tourists from Taiwan.

=== Archimedes bridge ===
In 1998, a Chinese-Italian consortium began planning the construction of a prototype of a submerged floating tunnel (also known as an Archimedes bridge). In 2005, the decision was made to build ithe prototype across Qiandao Lake. The bridge, which will be the first of its kind in the world, is expected to span 100 m (330 ft) as a proof of concept for larger bridges.

== Economy ==
The pristine water quality and environment are leveraged by several companies. Nongfu Spring uses the lake to produce its brand of mineral water, and Kaluga Queen raises sturgeon in pens at the lake, supplying a significant portion of the world's caviar. The lake's appeal has also driven an increase in tourism and housing development in the Zhejiang area since the late 1990s.

== Transport ==
An expressway links Hangzhou, Qiandao Lake, and Huangshan in Anhui province. Buses connecting Qiandao Lake leave from West Hangzhou bus station every half an hour . High-speed rail services began operating to the Qiandaohu railway station on the Hangzhou-Huangshan intercity railway on December 25, 2018.

== Gallery ==
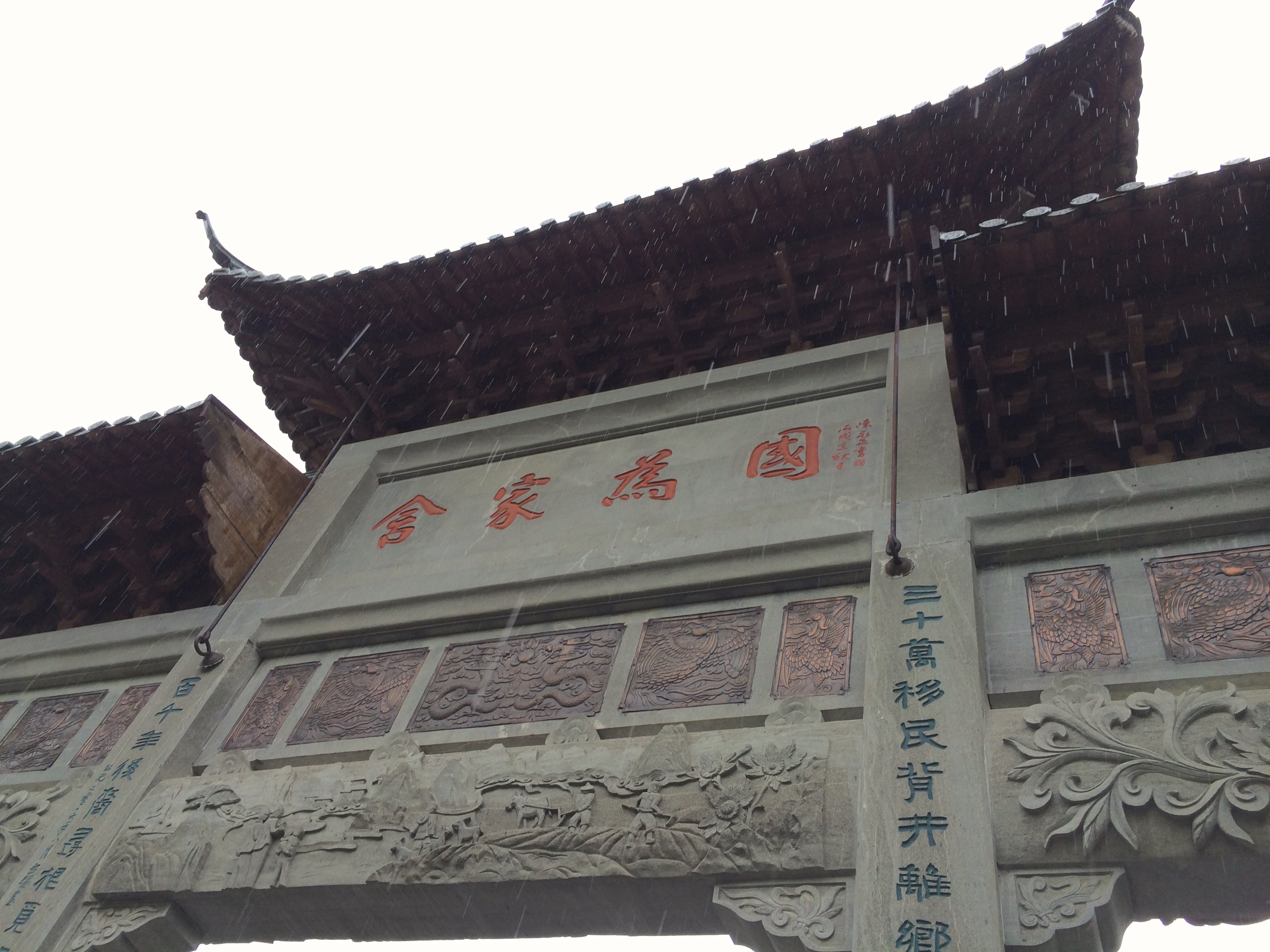
Entrance to the Scenic Area of Qiandao Lake

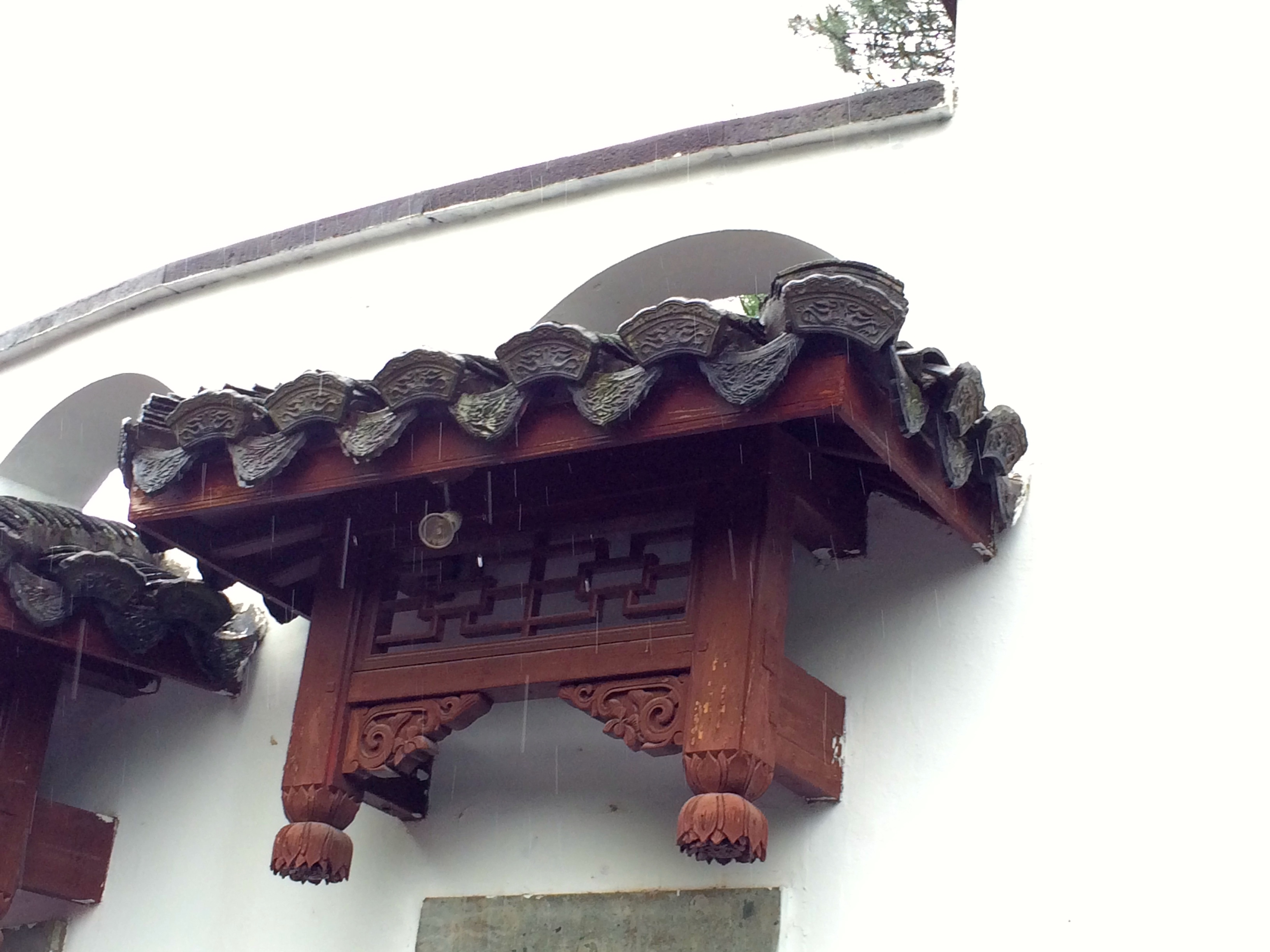
Huizhou style architecture

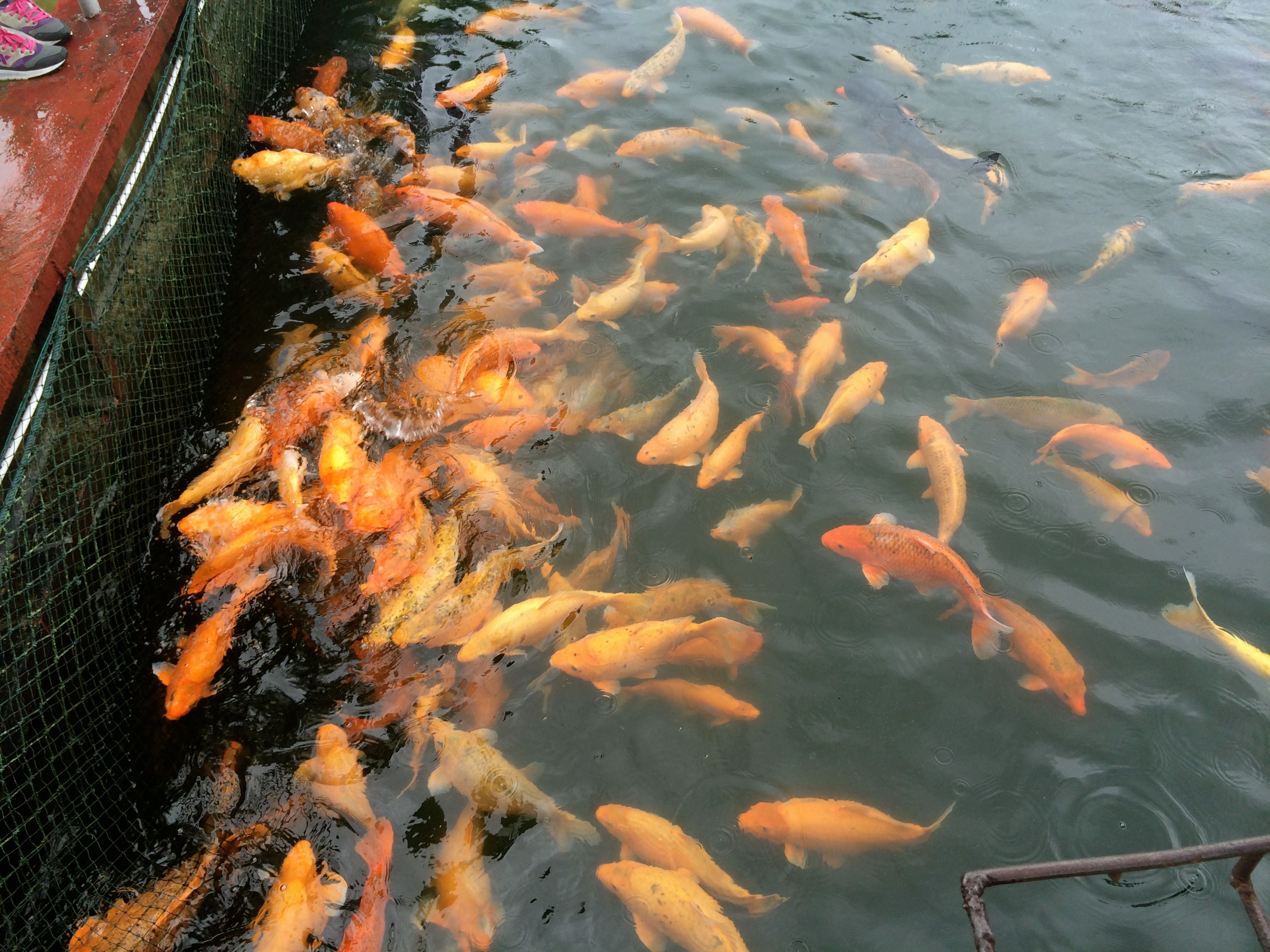
Koi at Qiandao Lake

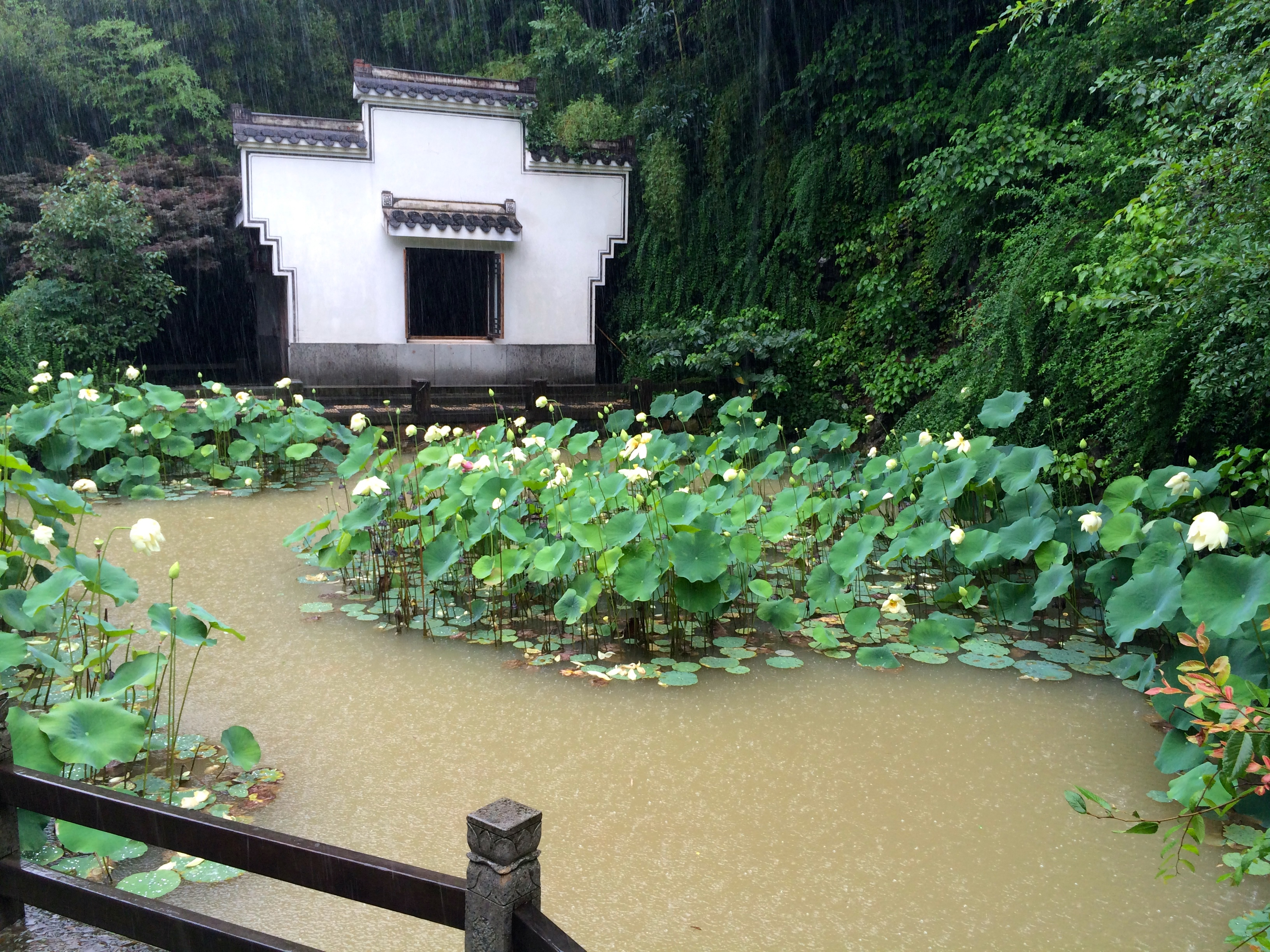
A lotus pond at Qiandao Lake

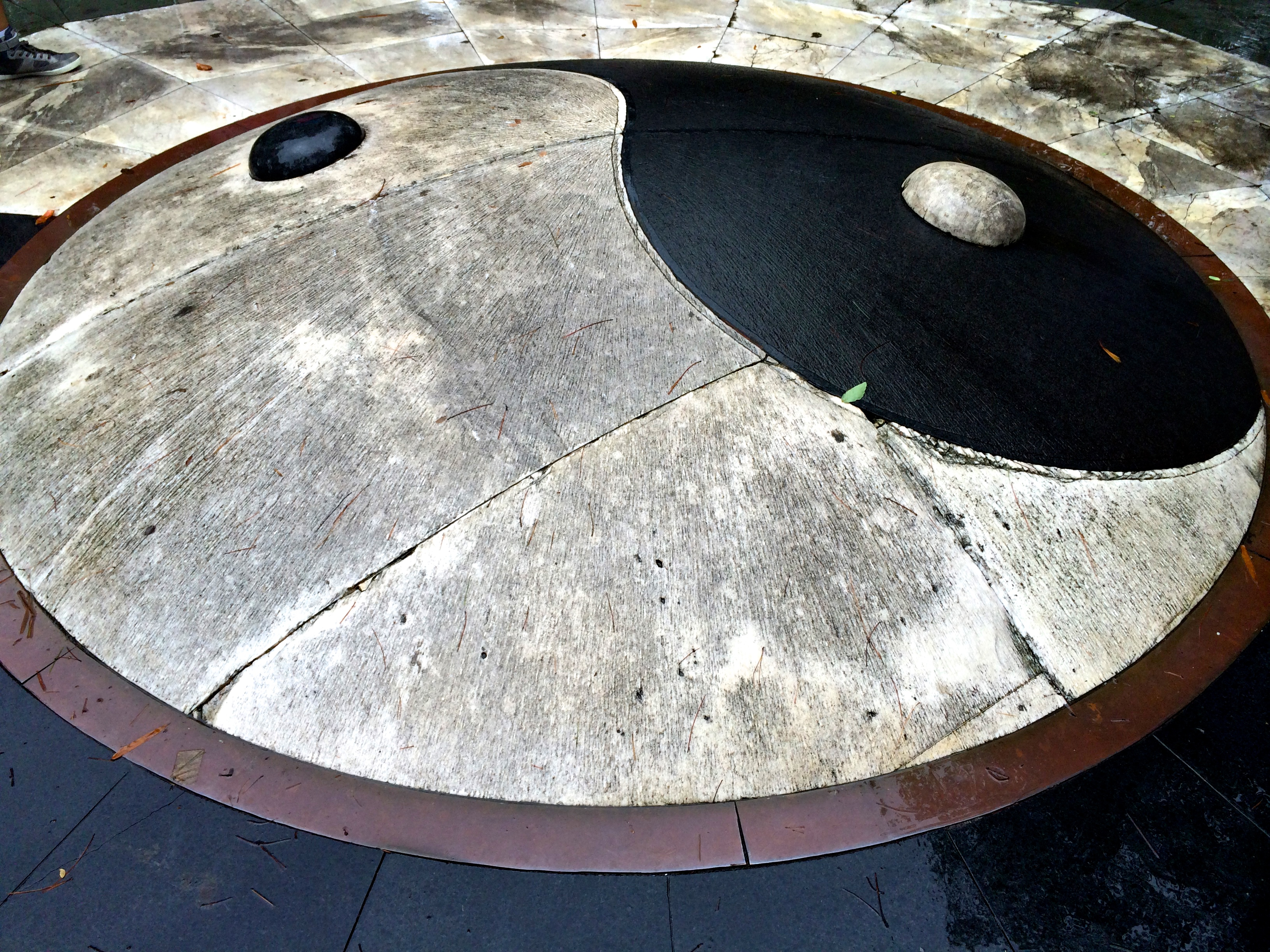
A Taiji symbol at Qiandao Lake

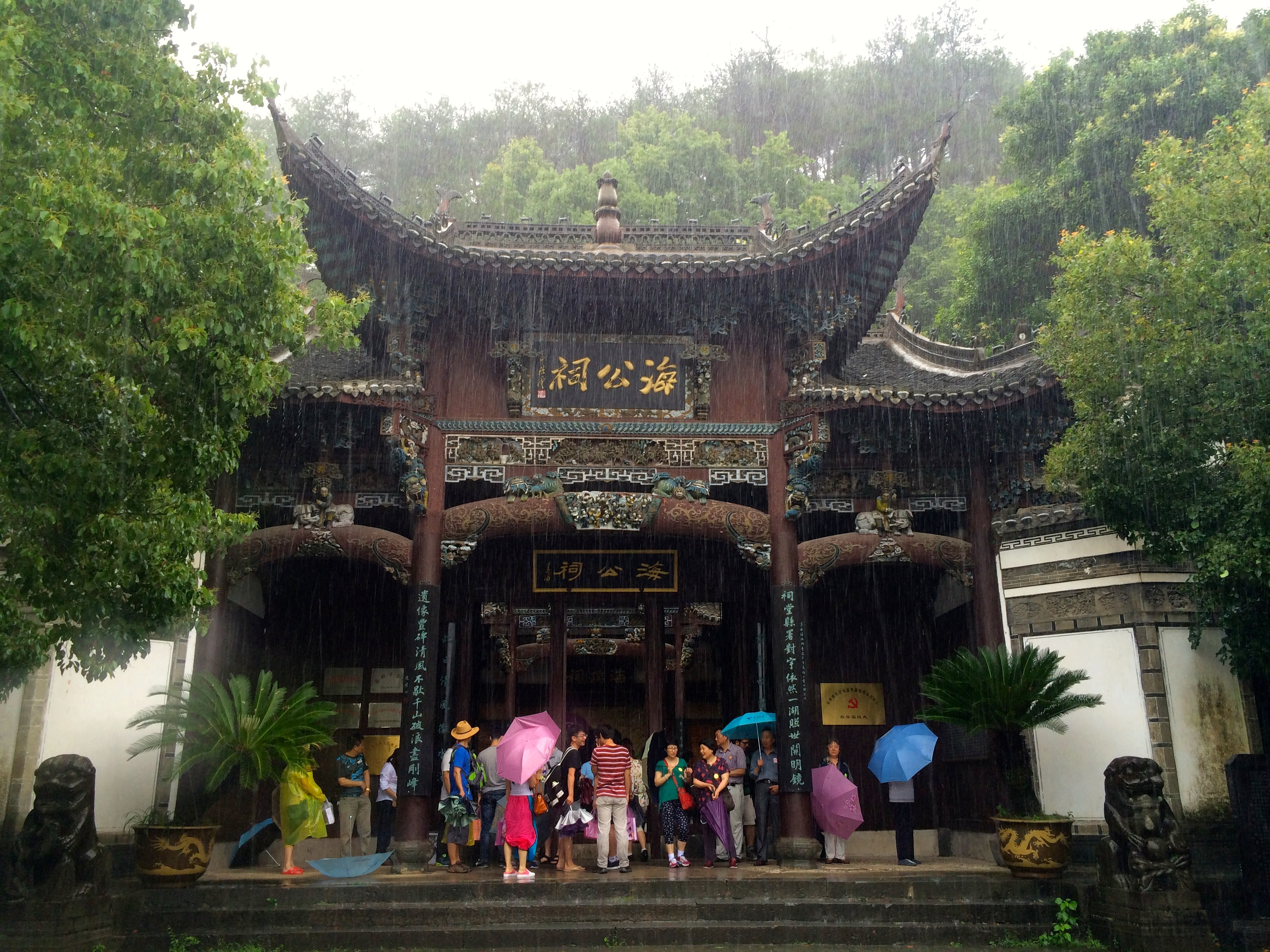
Shrine dedicated to Hai Rui on Longshan Island

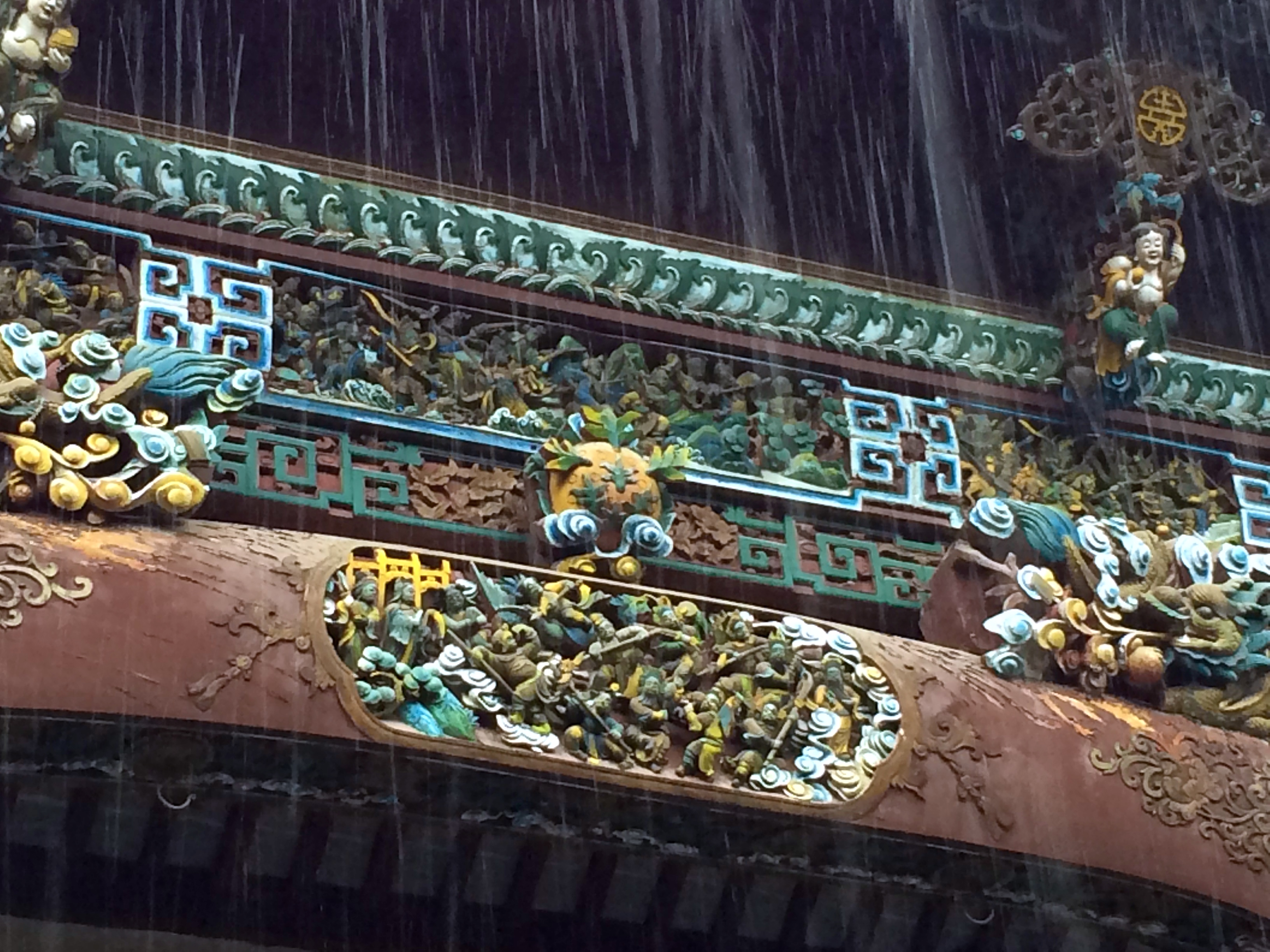
Painted wooden relief at the Hai Rui Shrine

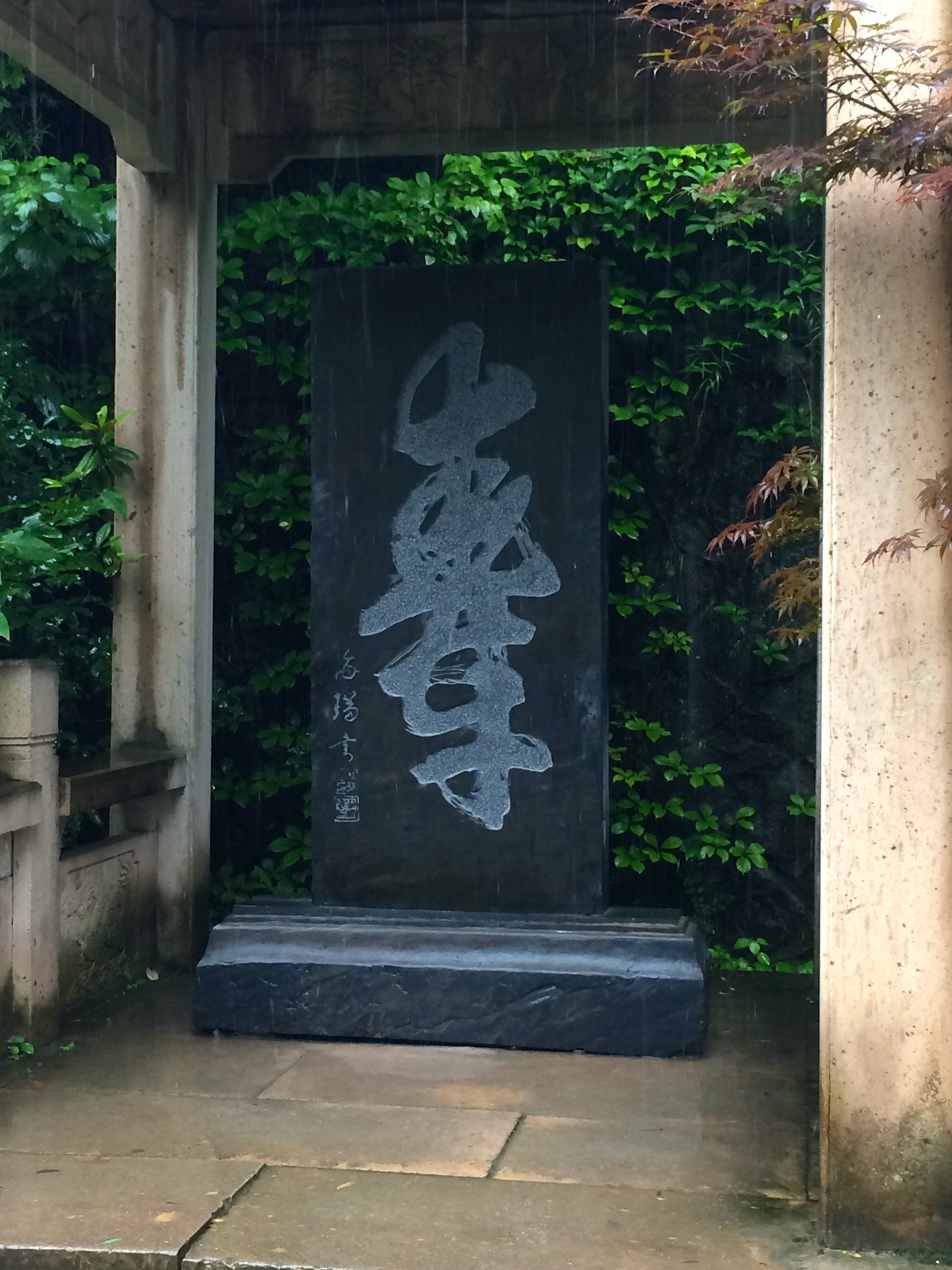
Shou (寿, longevity) character written by Hai Rui. The character can be viewed either right-side up or upside down to read "Shou".

== See also ==
- Lucky Buddha Beer
- Qiandao Lake Incident
- Hangzhou Qiandaohu, a company named after the lake, next to which its headquarters and brewery are located.
