= Hangzhou Qiandaohu =

Beer brewery in Hangzhou, China

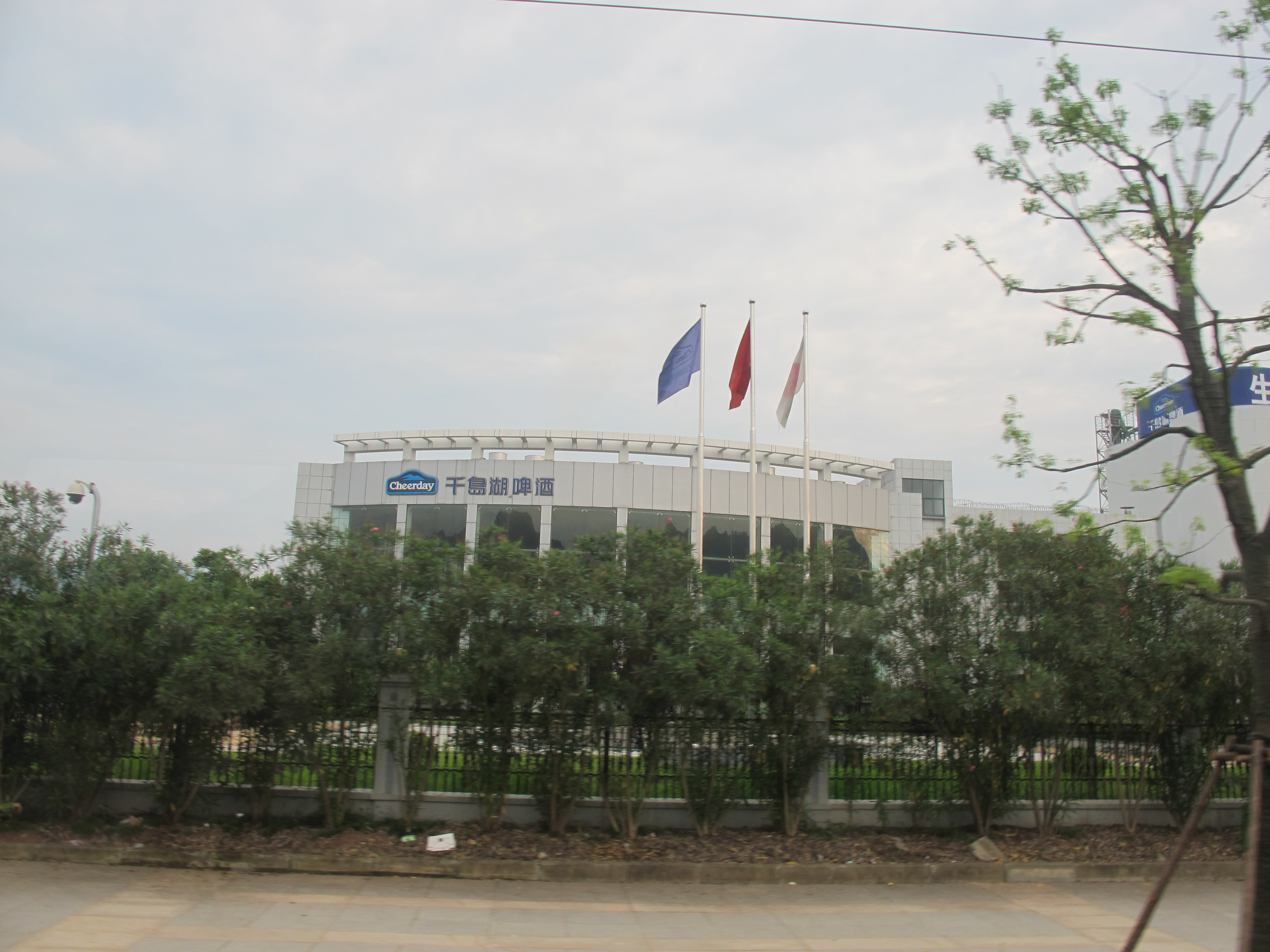
Cheerday headquarters

Hangzhou Qiandaohu Beer Co., Ltd. (Chinese: 杭州千岛湖啤酒有限公司; pinyin: hángzhōu qiāndǎohú píjiǔ) is a brewery located in the town of Qiandaohu, in Chun'an County, Hangzhou, Zhejiang, China. It produces several brands of beer, including Cheerday.

The company is named for Qiandao Lake, next to which its headquarters and brewery are located. In December 2006, the Kirin Brewery Company of Japan bought a 25% stake in the Hangzhou Qiandaohu Beer Co., Ltd. for US$38 million.

== See also ==
- Beer and breweries in China
