= Caviar =

Food consisting of salt-cured roe

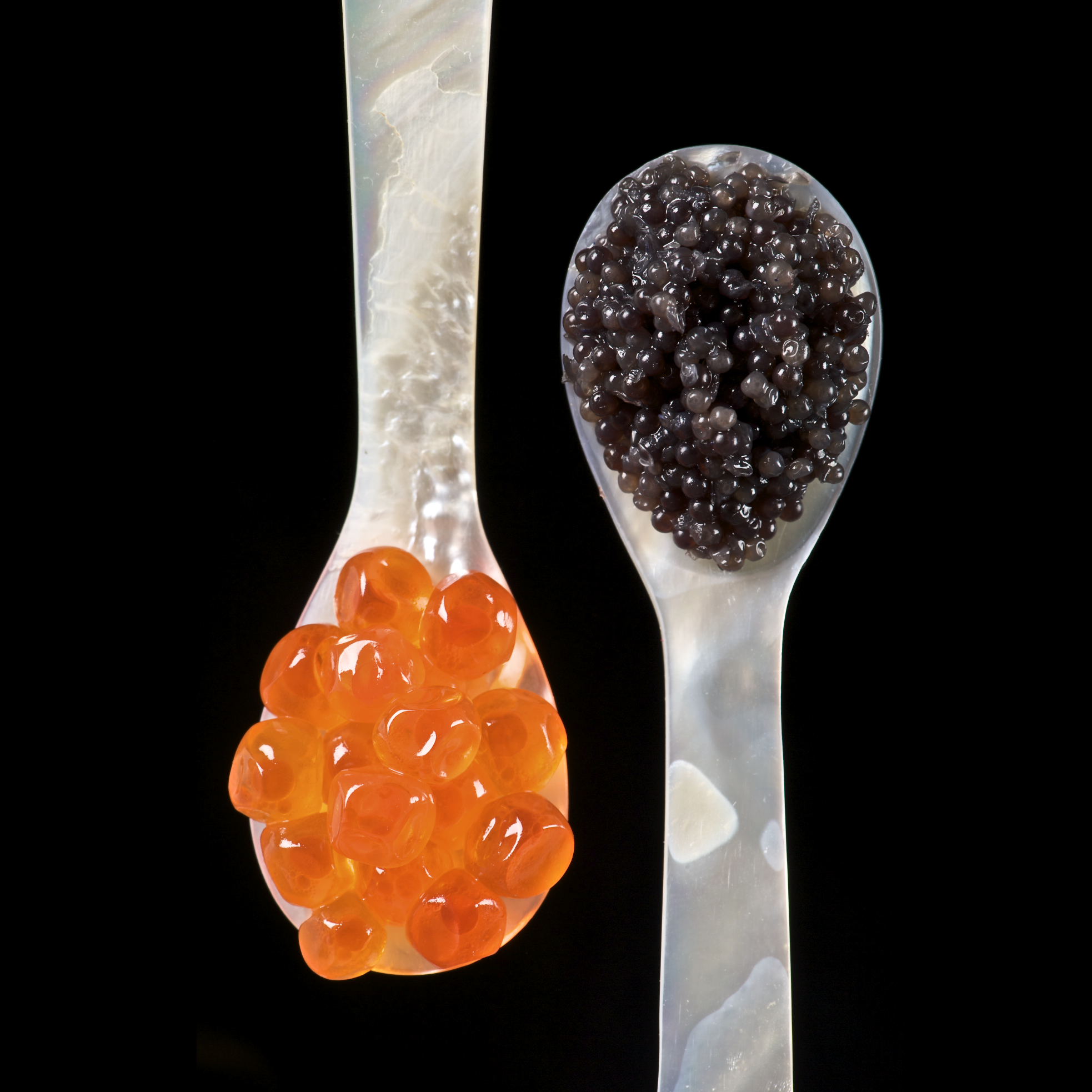
- Salmon roe (left) and sturgeon caviar (right) served with mother of pearl caviar spoons to avoid tainting the taste of the caviar.
- Place of origin: Iran (Persia) and/or Russia
- Region or state: Black Sea region, Sea of Azov region, Caspian Sea region

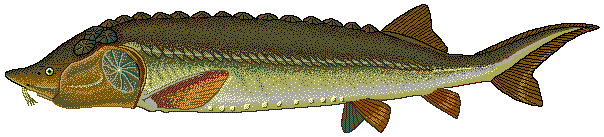
The rarest and most expensive form of caviar comes from the critically endangered beluga sturgeon that swims in the Caspian Sea.

Caviar or caviare is a food consisting of salt-cured roe of the family Acipenseridae (sturgeon). Caviar is considered a delicacy and is eaten as a garnish or spread. Traditionally, the term caviar refers only to roe from wild sturgeon in the Caspian Sea and Black Sea (beluga, ossetra and sevruga caviars). The term caviar can also describe the roe of other species of sturgeon or other fish such as paddlefish, salmon, steelhead, trout, lumpfish, whitefish, or carp.

The roe can be fresh (non-pasteurized) or pasteurized, which reduces its culinary and economic value.

== Terminology ==
The term caviare or caviar was first introduced into the English language in the late 16th century and appears to have been borrowed contemporaneously from a number of European languages, including French cavial, Italian caviale, Portuguese caviar, and Spanish cabial, all of which are derived from Turkish خاویار khāvyār, or Greek khaviari. The ultimate origin of the word is uncertain; Wilhelm Eilers proposes a contraction of خایه دار khāyeh-dār "egg-bearing" originally in reference to the sturgeons. Up to the 17th century, archaic spellings included chauiale, cavery, and cauiarie, and as early as 1625, it was becoming a three-syllable word, with the final "e" being dropped in speech. In Russian, the term for caviar is икра ikra, once common in English of the 16th and 17th centuries loaned as ikary.

According to the Food and Agriculture Organization of the United Nations (FAO), roe from any fish not belonging to the family Acipenseridae is not caviar, but "substitutes of caviar". In contrast, the Convention on International Trade in Endangered Species of Wild Fauna and Flora (CITES) defines caviar more broadly, covering the processed roe of all species within the order Acipenseriformes, which includes both sturgeons and paddlefish.

The term caviar is sometimes used to describe dishes that are perceived to resemble caviar, such as "eggplant caviar" (made from eggplant) and "Texas caviar" (made from black-eyed peas).

== History ==
Caviar and sturgeon from the Sea of Azov began reaching the tables of aristocratic and noble Greeks in the 10th century, after the commencement of large-scale trading between the Byzantine Empire and Kievan Rus'. The Russians likely learned to process fish eggs with salt from Greek traders who had passed along the Black Sea coast, but it was not until after the Mongol invasions that the caviar industry developed in Astrakhan. Production was for a long time centered on the Caspian Sea, with the Iranians and Russians accounting for most of its output.

In the 16th century, François Rabelais described caviar as the finest item of what is now called hors d'oeuvre. By 1569, the Russians had conquered the entire Volga River to its mouth. The Volga and its tributaries offered a diverse range of fish, including sturgeon and its caviar, as well as sterlets, a type of small sturgeon that pleased both Russian locals and foreigners.

Caviar was eaten differently in the past compared to today. Medieval Russians often ate it hot. The Travels of Olearius in Seventeenth-Century Russia says "they expel the roe from the membrane in which it is contained, salt it, and after it has stood for six to eight days, mix it with pepper and finely chopped onions. Some also add vinegar and country butter before serving it. It is not a bad dish. If one pours a bit of lemon juice over it, instead of vinegar, it gives a good appetite, and has a restorative effect."

== Varieties ==
The main types of caviar from sturgeon species native to the Caspian Sea are Beluga sturgeon, Sterlet, Russian sturgeon, and Sevruga. White Sturgeon is abundant and native to California and the U.S. Pacific Northwest. The rarest and costliest is from beluga sturgeon that swim in the Caspian Sea, which is bordered by Iran, Kazakhstan, Russia, Turkmenistan, and Azerbaijan. Wild caviar production was suspended in Russia between 2008 and 2011 to allow wild stocks to replenish. Iran allows the fishing of sturgeon off their coasts. Beluga caviar is prized for its soft, extremely large (pea-size) eggs. It can range in colour from pale silver-grey to black. It is followed by the small golden sterlet caviar which is rare and was once reserved for Russian, Iranian and Austrian royalty. Next in quality is the medium-sized, light brown to rich brown Ossetra, also known as Russian caviar. Others in the quality ranking are the grey sevruga caviar, the Chinese Kaluga caviar, and the American white sturgeon caviar. The Siberian variety with black beads is similar to sevruga and is popular because of its reduced (five years) harvest period, but it has a higher brine content than other kinds. The Chinese Kaluga hybrid varies in colour from dark grey to light golden green and is a close cousin of beluga caviar.

=== Quality factors and cost ===
An expensive caviar example at 1 kilogram (2.2 lb) sold for £20,000 (then US$34,500) is the Iranian 'Almas' product (from Persian: الماس, "diamond") produced from the eggs of a rare albino sturgeon between 60 and 100 years old from the southern Caspian Sea. Wild beluga sturgeon caviar from the Caspian Sea was priced in 2012 at $16,000 per 1 kilogram (35 oz). Cheaper alternatives have been developed from the roe of whitefish and the North Atlantic salmon.

Conventional sturgeon caviar was priced in 2014 at about $105 per 1 ounce (28 g) and from albino sturgeon up to $800 per ounce. Other quality factors are texture – with firmness having higher quality value – flavour qualities, such as creaminess, butter taste, and brine or mild fish finish, and whether the caviar was taken from the fish by massage (higher value) rather than by killing it. Caviar is generally sold in ounces. An ounce of sturgeon caviar costs between $45 and $1,000, depending on the variety of sturgeon and other factors.

== Industry ==
Top 16 Caviar Producers in 2017
Country	Caviar (Tonnes)
China	100
Russia	49
Italy	43
France	37
Poland	20
Germany	16
USA	16
Bulgaria	8
Uruguay	6
Israel	5
Saudi Arabia	5
Spain	5
Armenia	4
Belgium	4
Finland	4
Iran	4

=== China ===
China produces the most caviar of any single country. The largest caviar company in the world is the Chinese brand Kaluga Queen, which cultivates sturgeon at Qiandao Lake in Zhejiang.

=== Russia ===
In the wake of over-fishing, the harvest and sale of black caviar were banned in Russia in 2007. The ban on sturgeon fishing in the Caspian Sea has led to the development of aquaculture as an economically viable means of commercial caviar production. Russian caviar exports were also banned from 2002 to 2011.

=== Italy ===
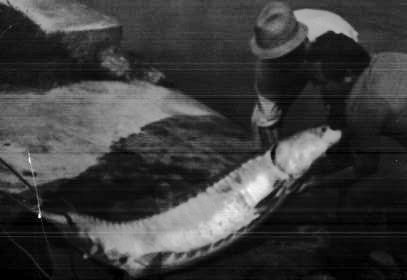
Sturgeon fishing in the Po river in 1950, Italy

Cristoforo da Messisbugo in his book Libro novo nel qual si insegna a far d'ogni sorte di vivanda, Venice, 1564, at page 110, gave the first recorded recipe in Italy about extraction of the eggs from the roe and caviar preparation "to be consumed fresh or to preserve". The writer and voyager Jérôme Lalande in his book "Voyage en Italie", Paris, 1771, vol. 8, page 269, noted that many sturgeon were caught in the Po delta area in the territory of Ferrara. In 1753 a diplomatic war broke out between the Papal States, governing the Ferrara territory, and the Venetian Republic about sturgeon fishing rights in the Po River, the border between the two states. From about 1920 and until 1942, there was a shop in Ferrara, named "Nuta" from the nickname of the owner Benvenuta Ascoli, that processed all the sturgeons caught in the Po River for caviar extraction, using an elaboration of the original Messisbugo recipe, and shipped it to Italy and Europe. A new owner sporadically continued production until 1972, when the sturgeon stopped swimming up the Po River. Since 2015, some sturgeon have reappeared in the Po.

Currently, Italian caviar is obtained almost entirely from bred sturgeons. The caviar production is concentrated predominantly in Brescia, which is considered the capital of Italian caviar: in this area, in Calvisano, is located the world's largest sturgeon farm, which produces 25 tonnes of caviar each year. Italy is a top producer of caviar.

=== North America ===
In the early 20th century, Canada and the United States were the major caviar suppliers to Europe; they harvested roe from the lake sturgeon in the North American Midwest, and from the shortnose sturgeon and the Atlantic sturgeon spawning in the rivers of the East Coast of the United States. The American caviar industry started when Henry Schacht, a German immigrant, opened a business catching sturgeon on the Delaware River. He treated his caviar with German salt and exported a great deal of it to Europe. Around the same time, sturgeon was fished from the Columbia River on the West Coast of the United States, also supplying caviar. American caviar was so plentiful at the time that it was given away at bars to induce or prolong patrons' thirst.

Today, the shortnose sturgeon is rated Vulnerable in the IUCN Red List of endangered species and rated Endangered per the Endangered Species Act. With the depletion of Caspian and Black Sea caviar, production of farmed or "sustainable" caviar has greatly increased. In particular, northern California is reported to account for 70% to 80% of U.S. production.

In 2021, a significant illegal sturgeon egg harvesting and selling ring run in part by the former top sturgeon biologist for the Wisconsin Department of Natural Resources (DNR) was discovered and broken up by investigators.

In coastal British Columbia, Fraser River white sturgeon are sustainably farmed to produce caviar.

=== Spain ===
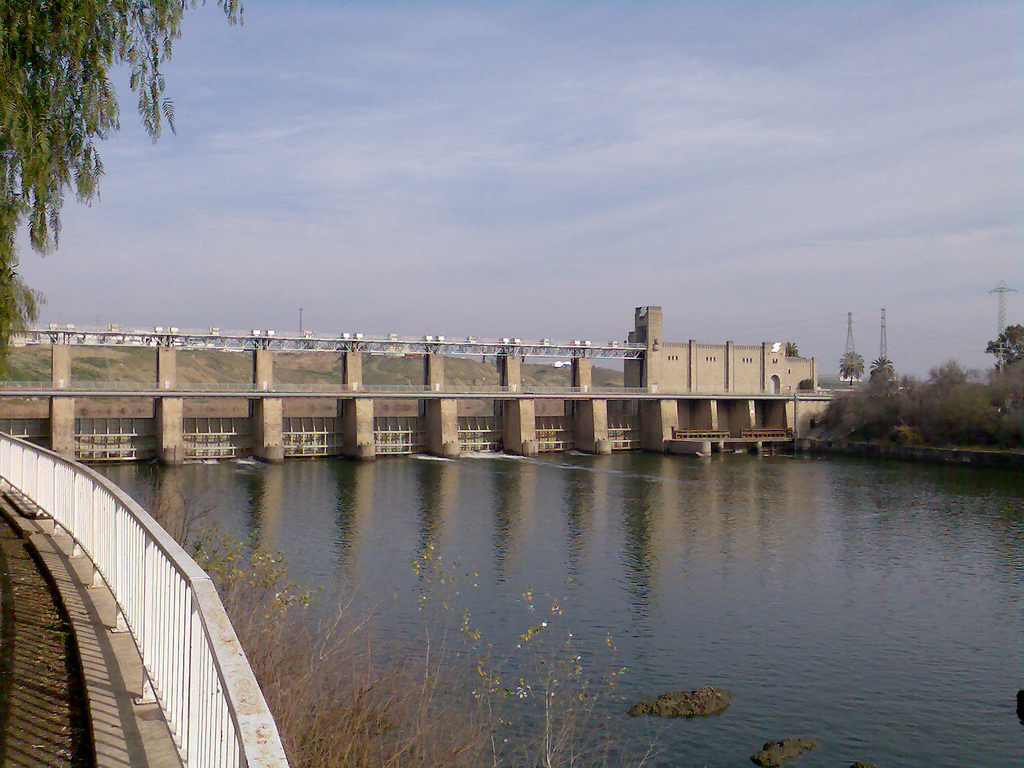
The dam at Alcalá del Río, started in 1931, blocked the upstream migration of sturgeon in the Guadalquivir.

The 17th-century book Don Quixote mentions "cavial" in a banquet of German pilgrims. Until 1992, sturgeons and caviar were collected at the lower parts of rivers Guadalquivir, Ebro, Duero and Tajo. From 1932 to 1970, the Ybarra family had a factory in Coria del Río. Overfishing, pollution and the Alcalá del Río dam eliminated the wild population of Acipenser naccarii. In Spain, a fish farm called Caviar de Riofrío produces organic caviar at Loja, Granada, Andalusia.

=== Armenia ===
Despite being landlocked, Armenia has developed a caviar industry based on farmed sturgeon, primarily in aquaculture facilities in the Ararat Valley. Estimates indicate approximately 10–20 tonnes of caviar production annually. Their most famous brand of caviar, Petrossian, was founded in 1920 by two Armenian brothers, with headquarters in Paris, France.

=== Uruguay ===
As well with Canada and the United States, Uruguay has become a major producer and exporter.

=== Israel ===
Kibbutz Dan in Israel produces four tons of caviar a year. The farm is fed by the Dan tributary of the Jordan River.

=== Madagascar ===
Madagascar is the first African country that produces and exports caviar since 2018, in Lake Mantasoa.

=== Malaysia ===
In Malaysia, caviar production is relatively new and smaller in scale. Caviar is harvested from farmed sturgeon fish in Tanjung Malim, Perak. The caviar produced here is marketed as "tropical caviar". The first Malaysian brand of tropical caviar was launched in March 2019.

=== France ===
In France, caviar is produced on a small scale in the Gironde estuary of Nouvelle-Aquitaine.

== Ecology ==
Overfishing, smuggling and pollution caused by sewage entry into the Caspian Sea have considerably reduced the sea's sturgeon population.

In September 2005, the United States Fish and Wildlife Service banned the import of Caspian Sea Beluga caviar to protect the endangered Beluga sturgeon; a month later, the ban was extended to include Beluga caviar from the entire Black Sea basin. In January 2006, the Convention on the International Trade in Endangered Species of Wild Flora and Fauna (CITES) supported an international embargo on caviar export. In January 2007, this ban was partly lifted, allowing the sale of 96 tons of caviar, 15% below the official 2005 level. In July 2010, Russia and some other CIS countries restarted the export of caviar. The 2010 quotas allow for the export of three tons of beluga, 17 tons of sevruga and 27 tons of osetra. In September 2010, Kazakhstan launched a state monopoly brand, Zhaik Balyk, from the Kazakh word for the Ural River. Under the CITES agreement, Kazakhstan was granted the right to produce 13 of the 80 tons allowed up until 28 February 2011.

== Extraction ==
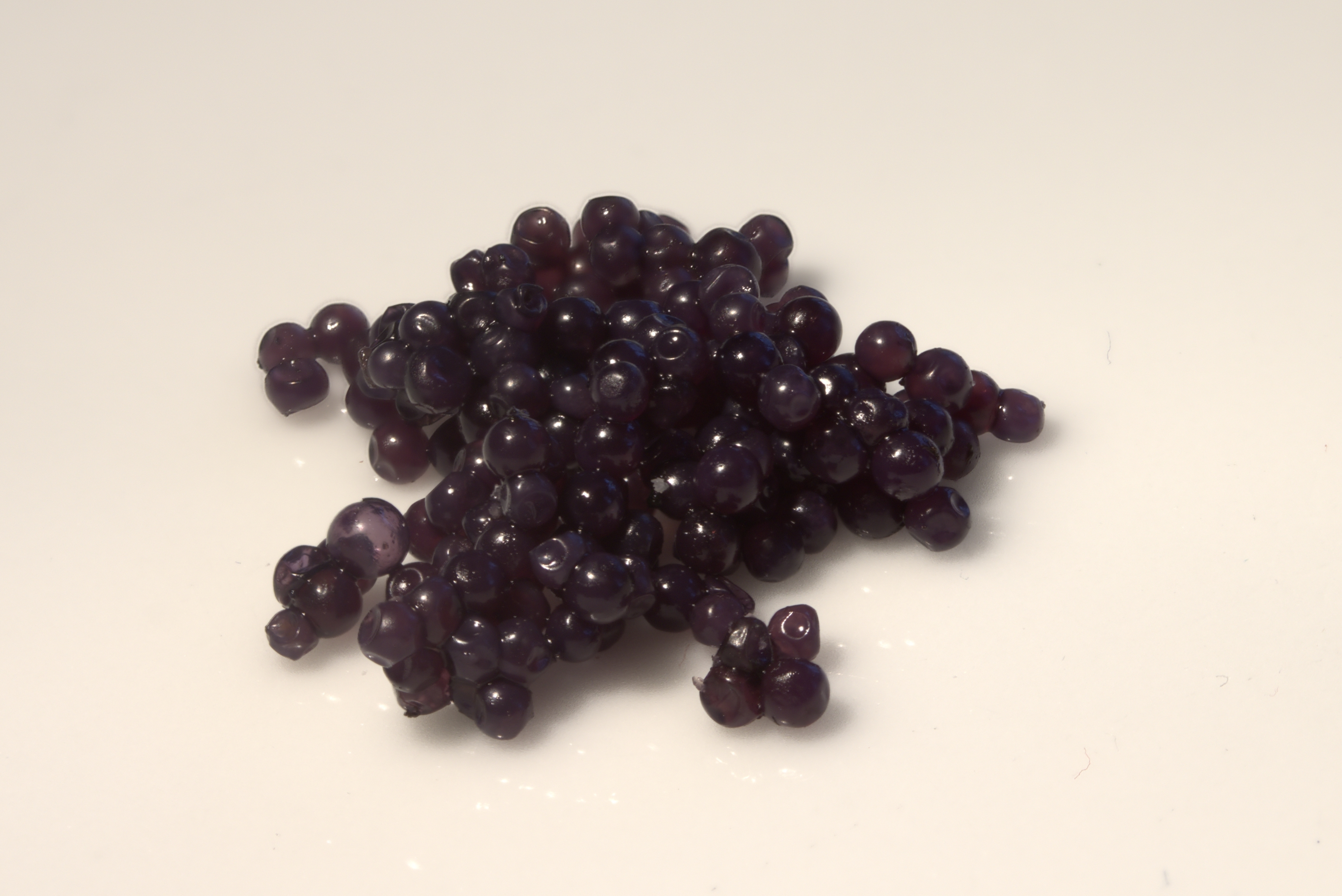
Imitation caviar of the lumpfish

Commercial caviar production historically involved stunning the fish and extracting the ovaries. Another method of extracting caviar is by removing eggs through a small incision, which allows the female to continue producing roe. Other farmers use a process called "stripping", which extracts the caviar from the fish via a small incision made along the urogenital muscle when the fish is deemed to be ready to be processed. An ultrasound is used to determine the correct timing. Removing the caviar by massage may yield higher quality and a more sustainable source.

== Preparation ==
Preparation follows a sequence that has not significantly changed over the last century. First, the ovaries are removed from a sedated female sturgeon and passed through a sieve to remove the membrane. Freed roes are rinsed to wash away impurities. Roes are now ready to become caviar by adding a precise amount of salt for taste and preservation. The fresh product is tasted and graded according to quality. Finally, the eggs are packed into lacquer-lined tins that will be further processed or sold directly to customers.

== Substitutes ==
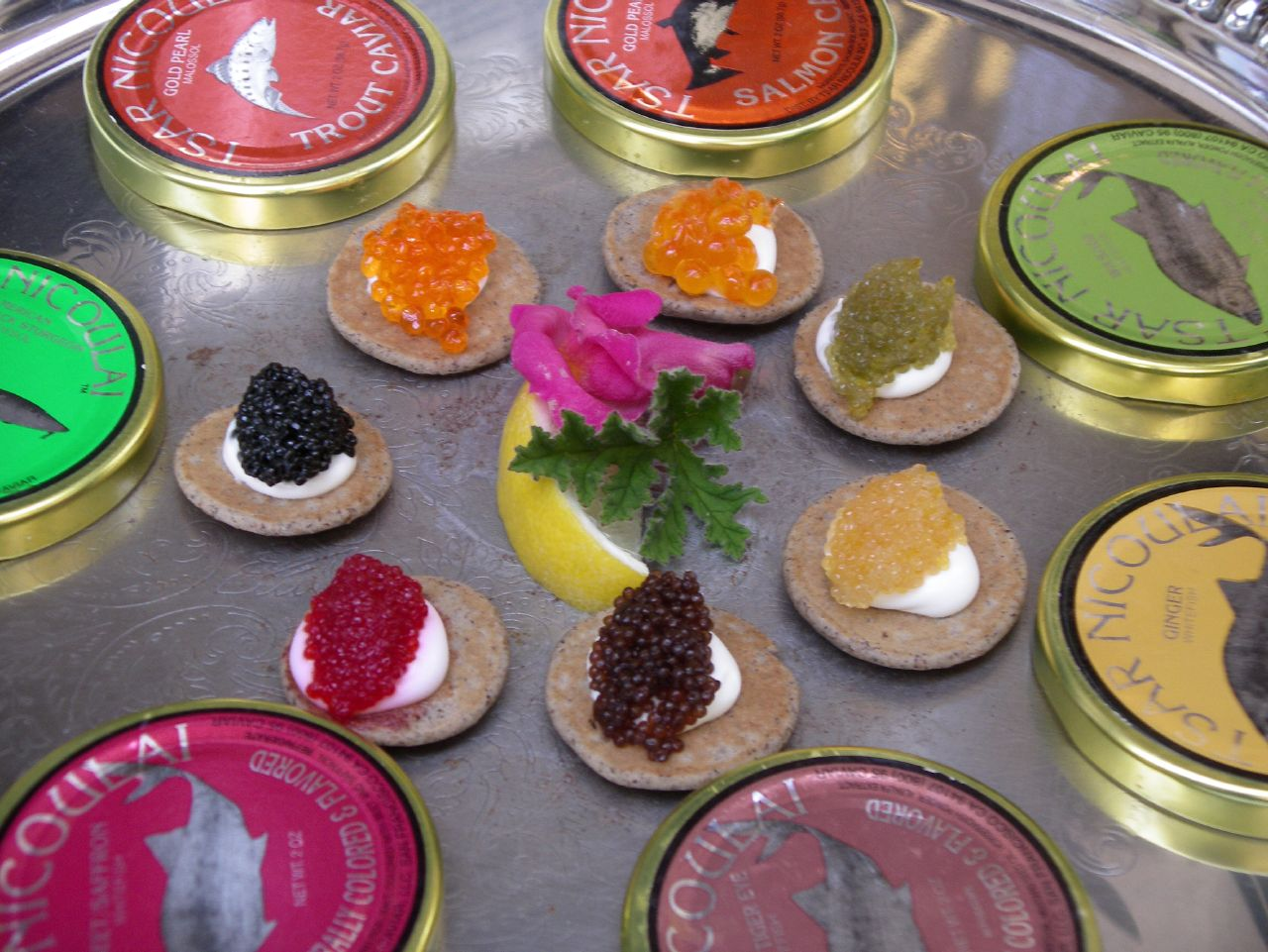
Caviar substitutes

A sturgeon caviar imitation is a black or red-coloured lumpsucker caviar sold throughout Europe in small glass jars.

In Sweden and Finland, the roes of many fish species, including vendace, burbot, salmon and common whitefish, are also commonly eaten in a similar manner as caviar. However, they are not caviar 'substitutes' but are enjoyed in their own right.

Spherification of liquids with alginate (a seaweed polysaccharide) is used to recreate caviar's texture. With liquids flavored to resemble caviar, one obtains kosher and vegan caviar substitutes. They resemble beluga caviar in appearance and are either used as a food prop for television and film or enjoyed by vegetarians and other people worldwide.

In Scandinavia, a type of sandwich spread is available, made from smoked cod roe and other ingredients, which is referred to as smörgåskaviar (meaning "sandwich caviar"). Outside Scandinavia, the product is referred to as creamed smoked roe or in French as Caviar de Lysekil.

== Nutrition ==
Caviar is 48% water, 25% protein, 18% fats, and 4% carbohydrates. In a common serving amount of 16 grams (one tablespoon), caviar supplies 44 kilocalories of food energy, 53% of the Daily Value (DV) of vitamin B12, and moderate amounts (10–19% DV) of sodium, iron, magnesium, and selenium, with no other micronutrients in significant content.

== See also ==
- List of hors d'oeuvre
- Snail caviar
- Caviar diplomacy

== Sources ==
- Ayto, John (2013). The Diner's Dictionary: Word Origin of Food and Drink (2nd ed.). Oxford: Oxford University Press. ISBN 9780199640249.
- Davidson, Alan (2014). The Oxford Companion to Food. Oxford University Press. ISBN 978-0-19-967733-7.
- Goldstein, Darra (24 May 2022). The Kingdom of Rye: A Brief History of Russian Food. Univ of California Press. ISBN 978-0-520-38390-6.
- Patterson, K. David (2000). "Russia". In Kiple, Kenneth F.; Ornelas, Kriemhild Coneè (eds.). The Cambridge World History of Food: Volume 1 and 2. Cambridge: Cambridge University Press. pp. 1240–1247. ISBN 978-0521402163.
- Talbot Rice, Tamara (1967). Everyday Life in Byzantium. London: Hippocrene Books.
