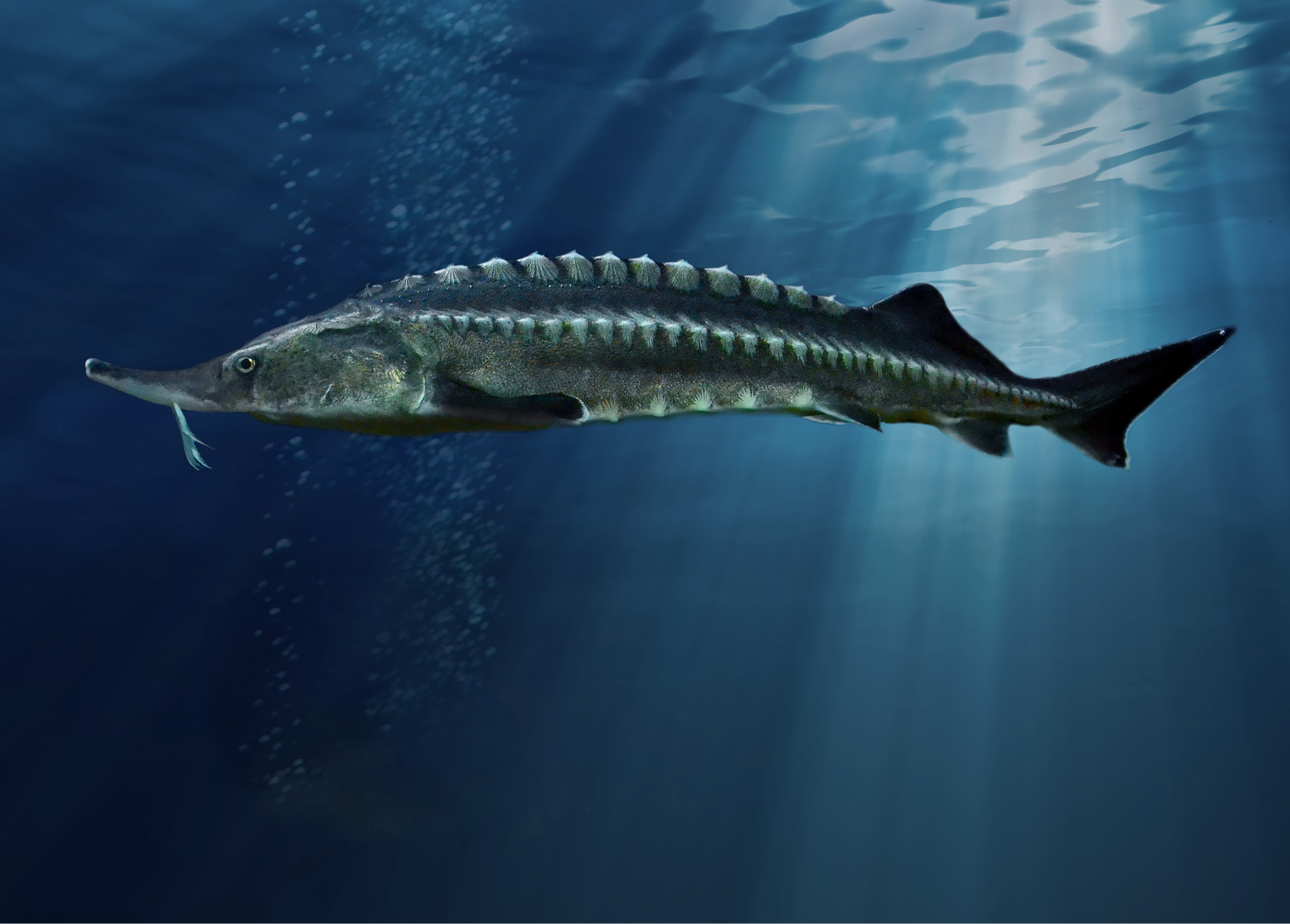
- Huso huso

Conservation status
- Critically Endangered (IUCN 3.1)
- CITES Appendix II

Scientific classification
- Kingdom: Animalia
- Phylum: Chordata
- Class: Actinopterygii
- Order: Acipenseriformes
- Family: Acipenseridae
- Genus: Huso
- Species: H. huso

Binomial name
- Huso huso (Linnaeus, 1758)
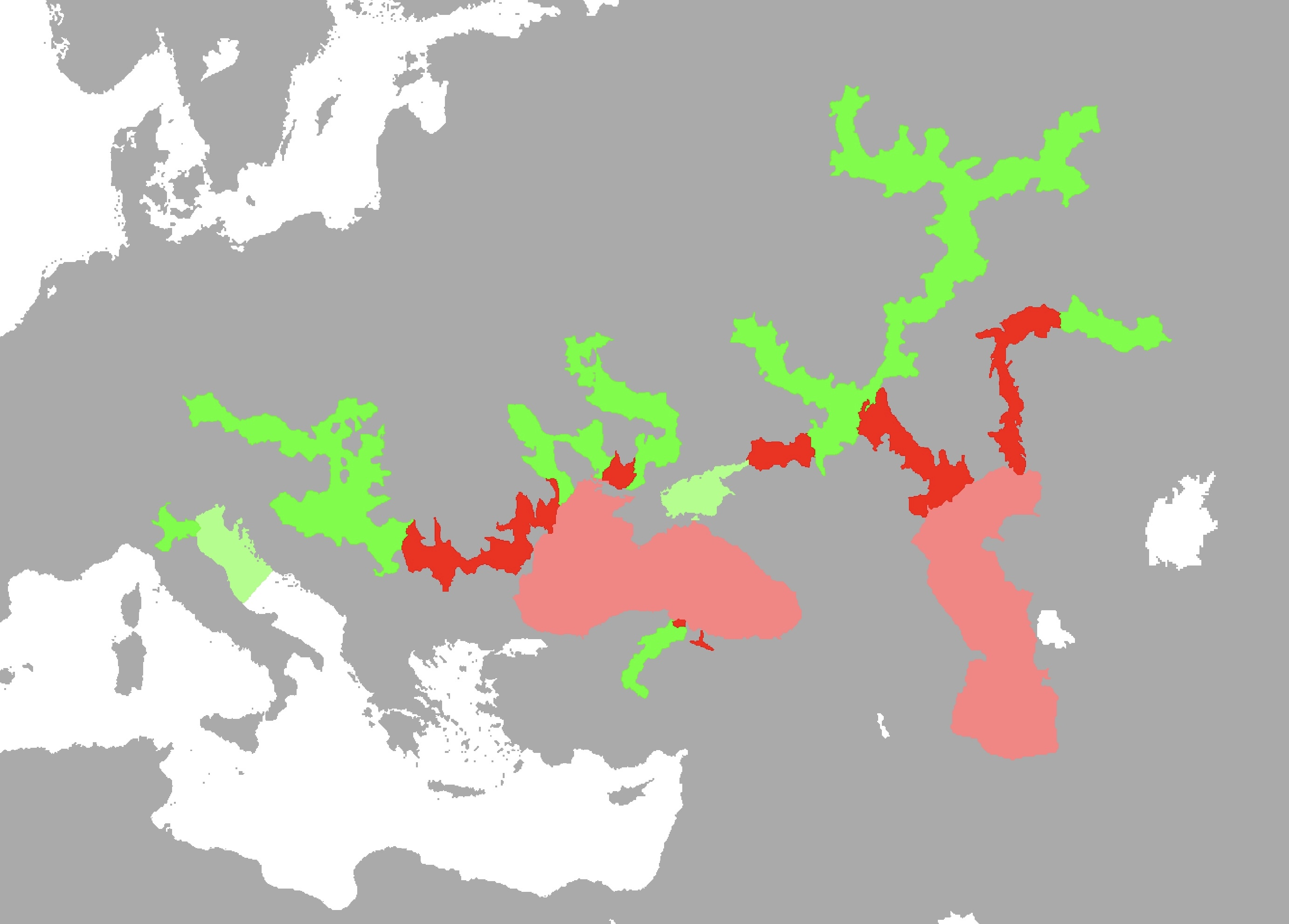
- red: extant Green: extinct

Synonyms
- List: Acipenser huso Linnaeus 1758; Acipenser belugus Forster 1767; Acipenser shyp Forster 1767; Acipenser schypa Gmelin 1789; Acipenser albulus Forster 1767; Huso ichthyocollus Bonaparte 1846; Acipenser vallisnerii Molin 1853; Huso huso maeoticus Sal'nikov & Malyatskii 1934; Huso huso ponticus Sal'nikov & Malyatskii 1934; Huso huso ponticus n. occidentalis Sal'nikov & Malyatskii 1934; Huso huso ponticus n. orientalis Sal'nikov & Malyatskii 1934; Huso huso caspicus Babushkin 1942; Huso huso caspicus n. curensis Babushkin 1942; Huso huso orientalis Lelek 1987

= Beluga (sturgeon) =

Beluga Temporal range: Pleistocene–Recent

Species of fish in the sturgeon family

The beluga (/bəˈluːɡə/), also known as the beluga sturgeon or great sturgeon (Huso huso), is a species of sturgeon, which are anadromous fish of the family Acipenseridae of the order Acipenseriformes. It is found primarily in the Caspian and Black Sea basins, and formerly in the Adriatic Sea. Based on maximum size, it is the third-most-massive living species of bony fish. Heavily fished for the female's valuable roe, known as beluga caviar, wild populations have been greatly reduced by overfishing and poaching, leading IUCN to classify the species as critically endangered.

== Etymology ==
The common name for the sturgeon, as well as for the unrelated beluga whale, is derived from the Russian word белый (belyj), meaning 'white', probably referring to the extensive pale colour on the flanks and belly in beluga compared to that of other sturgeons.

== Description ==
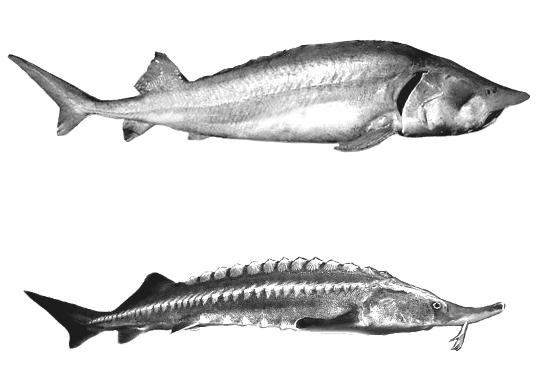
Comparison between an adult (above) and a juvenile (below) Huso huso

Huso huso shows typical characteristics of other sturgeon, such as an elongated body, heterocercal tail, partially cartilaginous skeleton, naked skin and longitudinal series of scutes.

The dorsal fin has 48 to 81 soft rays, and the anal fin, much shorter, has 22 to 41 soft rays. There are five in a series of longitudinal scutes: dorsal (one series, 9–17 scutes), lateral (two series, one per side, 28–60 scutes each) and ventral series (two series, one per side, 7–14 scutes each). The surface of the skin is covered by fine denticles. The rostrum is conical and contains numerous sensory pits on both ventral and dorsal surfaces. The mouth is large, crescent-shaped and protractile, with the upper lip continuous while the lower lip is interrupted by a large gap. The barbels are laterally compressed with foliate appendages, arranged in two pairs, originating midway or closer to the mouth than to the tip of the snout.

However, during growth, the beluga sturgeons show evident morphologic changes:

- Juveniles are slender, and the head is quite narrow with a mouth ventrally placed but projecting upward. The snout is thin and pointed (almost half of the head), scutes are evident, back and flancs are dark grey or black and the belly is white.
- Adults are heavy-set, spindle-shaped, large and humpbacked. The head is massive with a very large protractile mouth that gradually moves in an almost frontal position during growth. The snout is quite short (one-third to one-quarter of the head), and scutes gradually undergo absorption and decrease in number with age. Colouring is blue-grey or dark brown, with silver or grey flanks and white belly. The dark dorsum contrasts strongly against the rest of the body;
- Very old specimens are stocky, with a large head and an enormous mouth.

=== Size ===
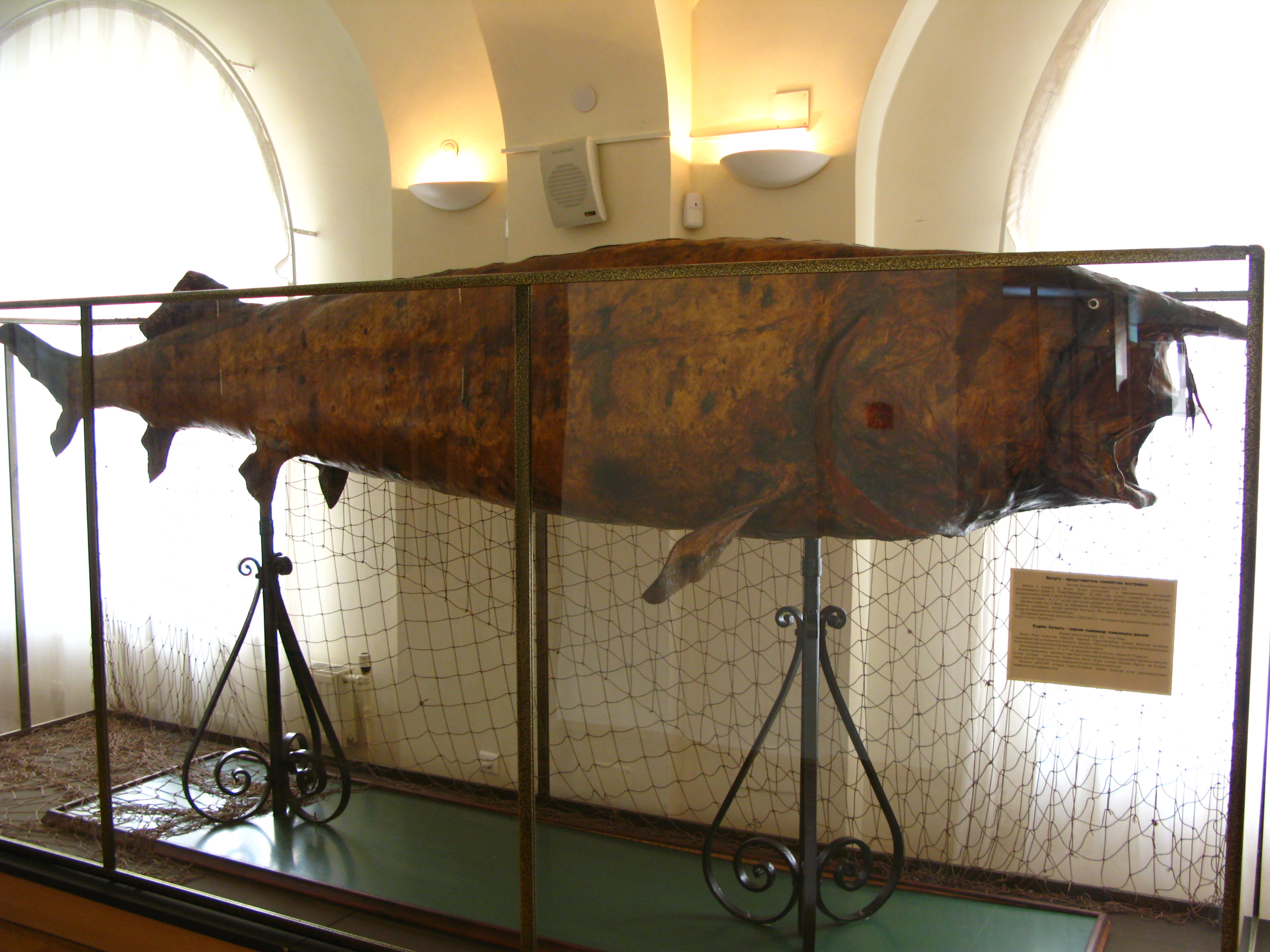
A 1000-kg, 4.17-m-long beluga fish from the Volga River (National Museum of Tatarstan, Kazan, Russia)

Among all extant bony fishes, the beluga sturgeon rivals the ocean sunfish (Mola sp.) as the most massive fish and is the second-longest bony fish after the giant oarfish (Regalecus glesne). It is the largest freshwater fish in the world. The beluga also rivals the great white shark (Carcharodon carcharias) and the greenland shark (Somniosus microcephalus) for the title of largest actively predatory fish.

The largest accepted record is of a female taken in 1827 in the Volga estuary at 1,571 kg (3,463 lb) and 7.2 m (23 ft 7 in). Another specimen reportedly weighed 1,220 kg (2,690 lb) and measured 6.1 m (20 ft 0 in) in length. Claims about greater length (10 m (32 ft 10 in), or even 12 m (39 ft 4 in)); and weight (2,000 kg (4,400 lb), 2,500 kg (5,500 lb), or even 3,000 kg (6,600 lb)) are disputed and unconfirmed; but they are not impossible. Several other records of aged sturgeon exceed 5 m (16 ft 5 in). Among sturgeons, only the closely related Kaluga (Huso dauricus) can attain similar size, with a maximum weight of 1,000 kg (2,200 lb).

Beluga of such great sizes are very old (continuing to grow throughout life) and have become increasingly rare in recent decades because of heavy fishing of the species. Today, mature belugas that are caught are generally 142–328 cm (4 ft 8 in – 10 ft 9 in) long and weigh 19–264 kg (42–582 lb). The female beluga is typically 20% larger than the male. An exceptionally large beluga recently caught weighed 960 kg (2,120 lb) and measured 3.4 m (11 ft 2 in).

== Biology ==
A sub-adult beluga sturgeon swimming in an aquarium

Due to rampant overfishing, the average lifespan of beluga sturgeon is unknown, with no specimens living past their 56th year. However, the species is reportedly quite long-lived, being capable of surviving over 100 years in the wild.

=== Spawning ===
Like most sturgeons, the beluga is anadromous, migrating upstream in rivers to spawn on clean, hard substrate, which offers both support and cover to their sticky and adhesive eggs. Spawning biology and development of larval stages of the sturgeon, the most ancient fish of the Danube, co-evolved with the formation of the Danube valley, resulting in very different survival strategies in its early life stages. This appears to explain why different individuals of the same long-migratory species spawn as far upstream as 1,700 km (1,100 mi) upstream, while others spawn just 100 km (62 mi). To make the long journey to very distant spawning grounds, the sturgeon adapted a two-stage migration strategy, beginning in autumn when they enter the Danube River. After overwintering in the river, spawning takes place in the spring in reaches of the river offering adequate substrate and water-flow resting conditions. Very few locations of existing wintering and spawning grounds for sturgeon are presently known in the lower Danube, and none are known to exist in the river's upper reaches. The same situation concerns nursery sites upon which young sturgeon depend during their journey to the Black Sea.

Males attain sexual maturity at 12–16 years of age, whereas females do so at 16–22 years. They will spawn every four to seven years. At one time, beluga sturgeons could migrate up to 1,000 km (620 mi) upriver to spawn, but dams in almost every major tributary that they utilize have impeded historic spawning routes. The female lays her eggs on gravel from 4 to 40 m (13 to 131 ft) underwater. Upon hatching, the embryo are 11 to 14 mm (0.43 to 0.55 in) long, and 10–14 days later when they absorb their yolk sack, the length is 18 to 20 mm (0.71 to 0.79 in). While swimming back to the ocean, the young sturgeon may cover up to 60 km (37 mi) a day.

=== Diet ===
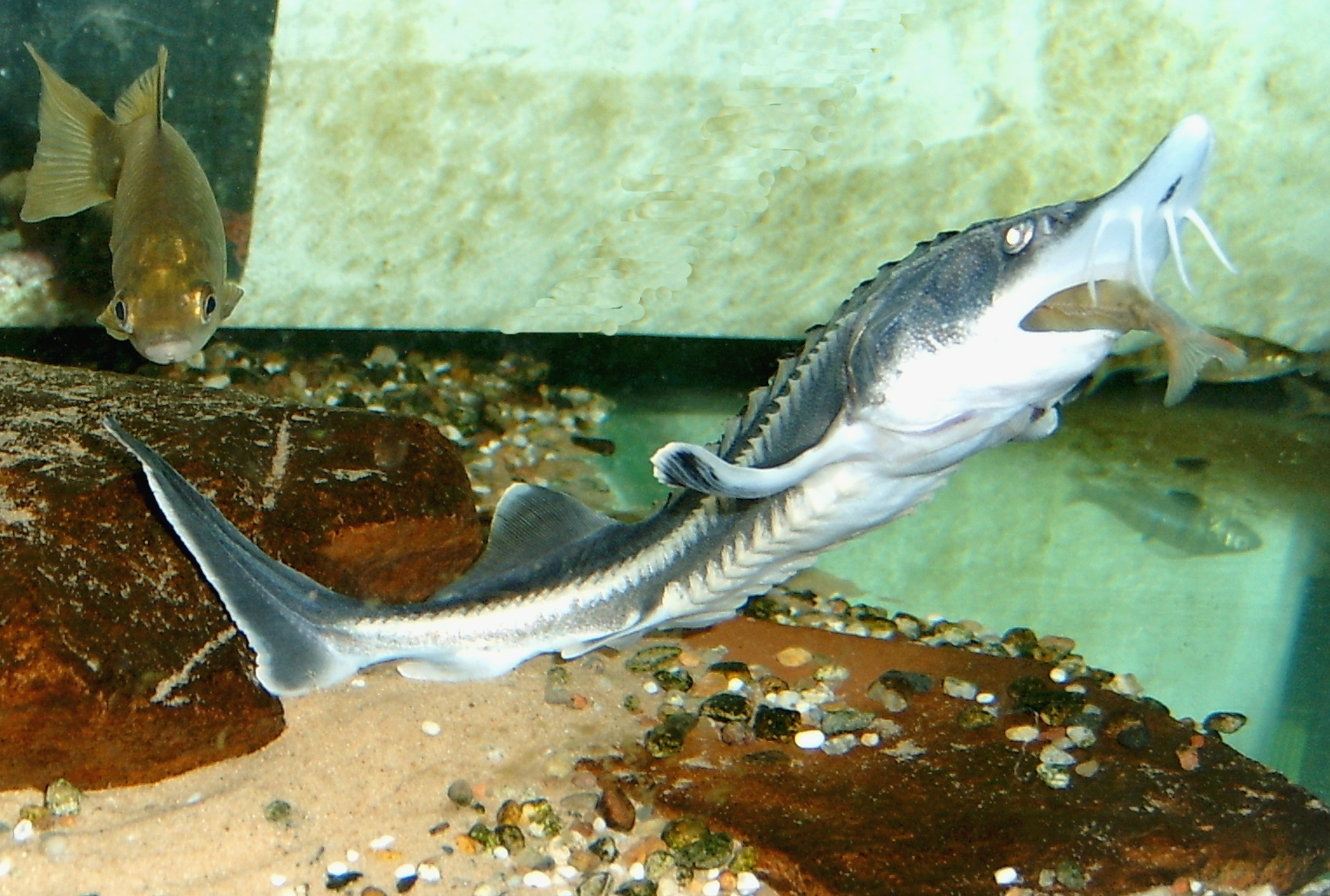
Fingerling of Huso huso eating a small fish in an aquarium

Huso huso is a pelagic predator whose local distribution is not influenced by the nature of the substrates, unlike with most of the sturgeons that show demersal attitude. The prey is sucked into the mouth opening extremely quickly.

Juveniles feed on benthic invertebrates in rivers and shallow coastal waters, where they grow quickly. At the length of 8–10 cm (3.1–3.9 in), they become largely piscivorous. Different diets have been observed throughout the distribution range of beluga sturgeon, as well as according to spawners' migration stage. Adults mainly eat a great diversity of large fish (73% of the diet). Additional food items may include molluscs and crustaceans, aquatic birds and young seals (Caspian seals, Pusa caspica).

The piscivorous diet of beluga sturgeon tends to change with age: in the Caspian Sea, it mainly consists of Clupeonella sp. for juveniles smaller than 40 cm, different species of Gobiidae for fish ranging between 40 and 280 cm and then mullets, Alosa sp. and other sturgeons for the largest.

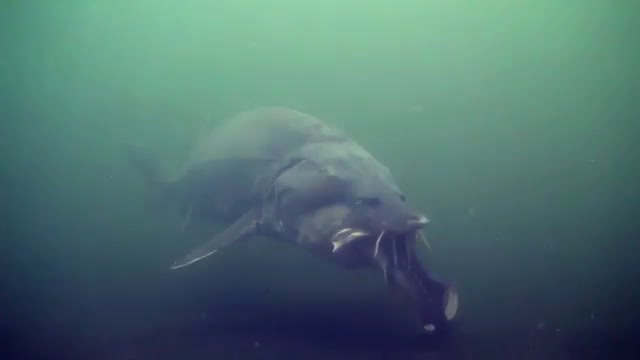
An adult H. huso eating a small sturgeon

In brackish environments of the Ponto-Caspian basin, the genera Alosa, Aspius and Engraulis are the preferred prey. In estuaries and rivers of the same area, migrating spawners eat various cyprinids, mainly Cyprinus carpio and Rutilus rutilus, Sander lucioperca and, among sturgeons, Acipenser ruthenus is the main prey.

Little is known about the diet of the extinct Adriatic population. It has been reported that in marine and brackish environments, adult Adriatic H. huso foraged primarily on molluscs (Cephalopoda, of which common cuttlefish, Sepia officinalis, and European squid, Loligo vulgaris, are particularly common in the Adriatic Sea) and fish belonging to the families Gadidae, Pleuronectidae, Gobiidae, Clupeidae, Scombridae and Mugilidae, but also on big crustaceans; in the rivers, they fed mainly on local Cyprinidae.

== Habitat ==
Beluga sturgeon are considered euryhaline, capable of moving freely between freshwater and estuaries, and thus can live in waters of varying saline content. Sturgeons have proven to be a durable species, able to survive some of the most altered and polluted rivers in the world.

Historically, beluga sturgeon were found in the Caspian Sea, Black Sea, Adriatic Sea, Sea of Azov, and all rivers interconnecting these waterways. Unfortunately, this range has been greatly reduced in modern times to the Caspian Sea, the Black Sea, and a few rivers such as the Danube, with attempts to reintroduce Belugas into various historic locations.

== Uses ==
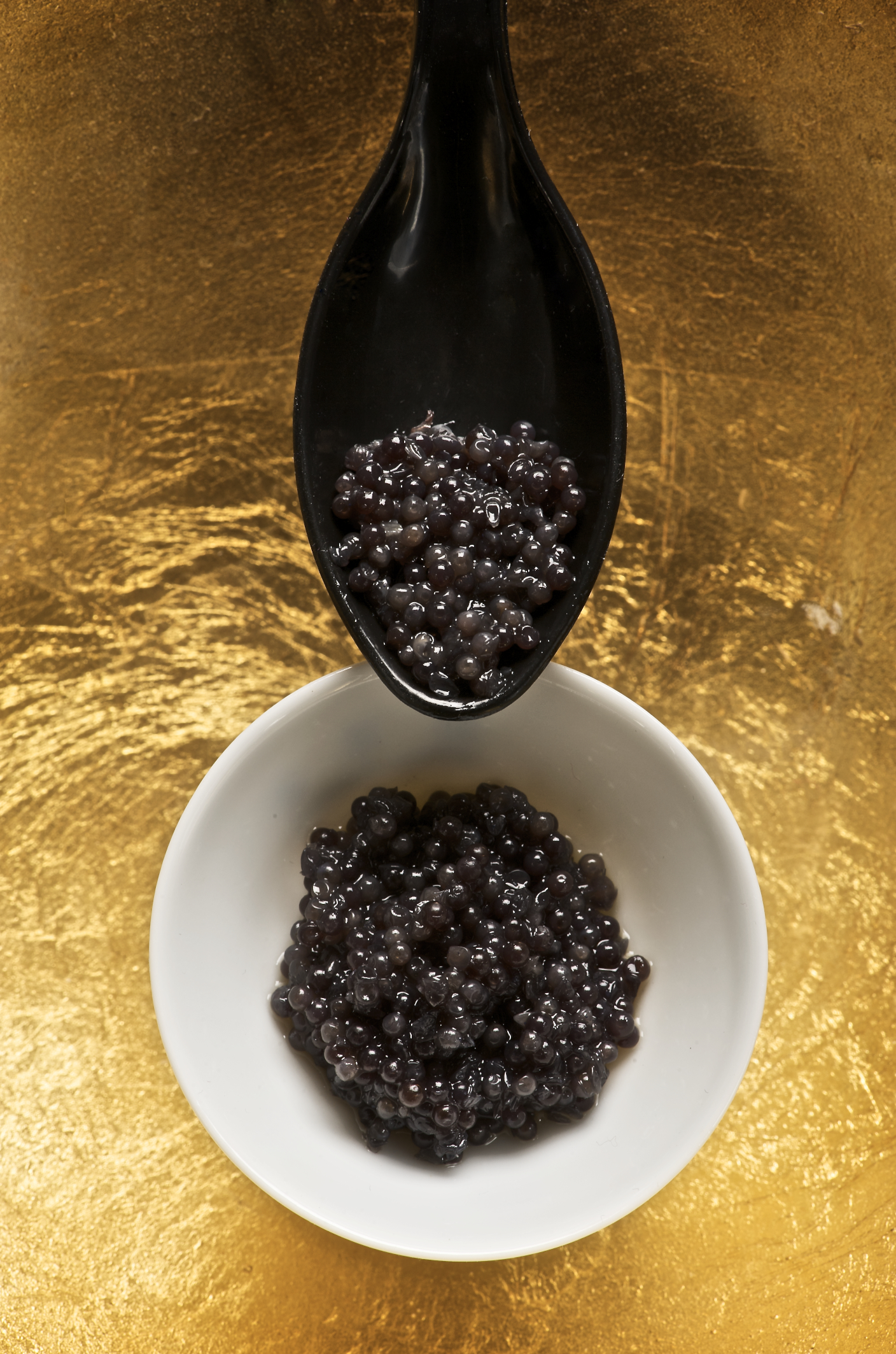
The caviar of a beluga sturgeon, the main reason for the massive overharvesting of this species

Beluga caviar is considered a delicacy worldwide. The flesh of the beluga is not particularly renowned, but it is a hearty white meat similar to that of swordfish. Beluga caviar has long been scarce and expensive and the fish's critically endangered status has made its caviar even more expensive throughout the world.

The beluga's air bladder was used to make what was considered the best isinglass. While currently mostly substituted by cheaper alternatives such as cod isinglass, its use was still investigated as of the 21st century.

== Status ==
IUCN classifies the beluga as critically endangered. Due to aforementioned poaching of the sturgeon, the Danube is the only river remaining with naturally reproducing sturgeon populations within the European Union. The sturgeon remains a protected species listed in Appendix III of the Bern Convention, and its trade is restricted under CITES Appendix II. The Mediterranean population is strongly protected under Appendix II of the Bern Convention, prohibiting any intentional killing of these fish.

The United States Fish and Wildlife Service has banned imports of beluga caviar and other beluga products from the Caspian Sea since 6 October 2005, after listing beluga sturgeon under the U.S. Endangered Species Act.

=== Repopulation efforts ===
Since 2015, an official captive breeding scheme has been established in Italy, with beluga from the Azov Sea. Then, after the building of a fish ladder on Isola Serafini dam, on 2019 hundreds of young microchipped beluga and 60 tagged subadults were released into the Po river, following EU Projects (Life Ticino Biosurce). Since then, many H. huso were released in the Po river, attempting to resurrect the extinct Adriatic population.

Management of sturgeon fisheries within the Caspian Sea began in the 1950s and while the initial regulations had honorable intentions, they achieved dwindling effects due to the ever present demand for the fish's caviar. In July 2016, Sturgeon Aquafarms in Bascom, Florida, became the first and only facility in the world to obtain a permit exemption for the sale of beluga sturgeon and its caviar in the U.S. Since 2017, the company has assisted in beluga sturgeon repopulation efforts across the world by providing over 160,000 fertilized eggs to the Caspian Sea region.

Following a World Wildlife Fund crowdfunding appeal, over 7,000 three month-old beluga sturgeons were released into the Danube River in Bulgaria. Despite repopulation efforts, the beluga sturgeon continues to face poaching threats. In 2021, two Romanian men in Grindu, Ialomita, were caught trying to smuggle a 140 kilogram, 2.5-metre beluga sturgeon in a wagon; the fish was later safely returned to the river.

== Threats ==
The beluga sturgeon is confronted by several critical threats that imperil its existence. Illegal harvesting, habitat disruption through dam construction, and pollution are among the most pressing challenges faced.

=== Illegal harvesting and poaching ===
The beluga sturgeon faces a significant threat from illegal catches for its meat and caviar. The excessive harvesting and a sharp increase in poaching have removed the largest and most mature specimens from the population, almost eliminating natural reproduction. This exploitation has pushed the species to the brink of extinction.

=== Habitat impoundment ===
The construction of dams, such as the Iron Gate in the Danube and the Volgograd Dam, has severely reduced the beluga sturgeon's available spawning grounds. These dams have blocked access to crucial river habitats, leading to a significant reduction in the species' ability to reproduce. Similar habitat loss has occurred in other rivers due to dam construction, greatly impacting the species' survival.

=== Pollution ===
Pollution from various sources, including oil, industries, sewage, and agriculture, is a critical threat to the beluga sturgeon. The species' long lifespan makes it vulnerable to pesticide contamination, resulting in reduced reproductive success and other health issues. Pollution negatively affects the quality of the sturgeon's habitat, compounding the challenges faced by this endangered species.
