= Taramasalata =

Roe-based meze common to Turkey and Greece

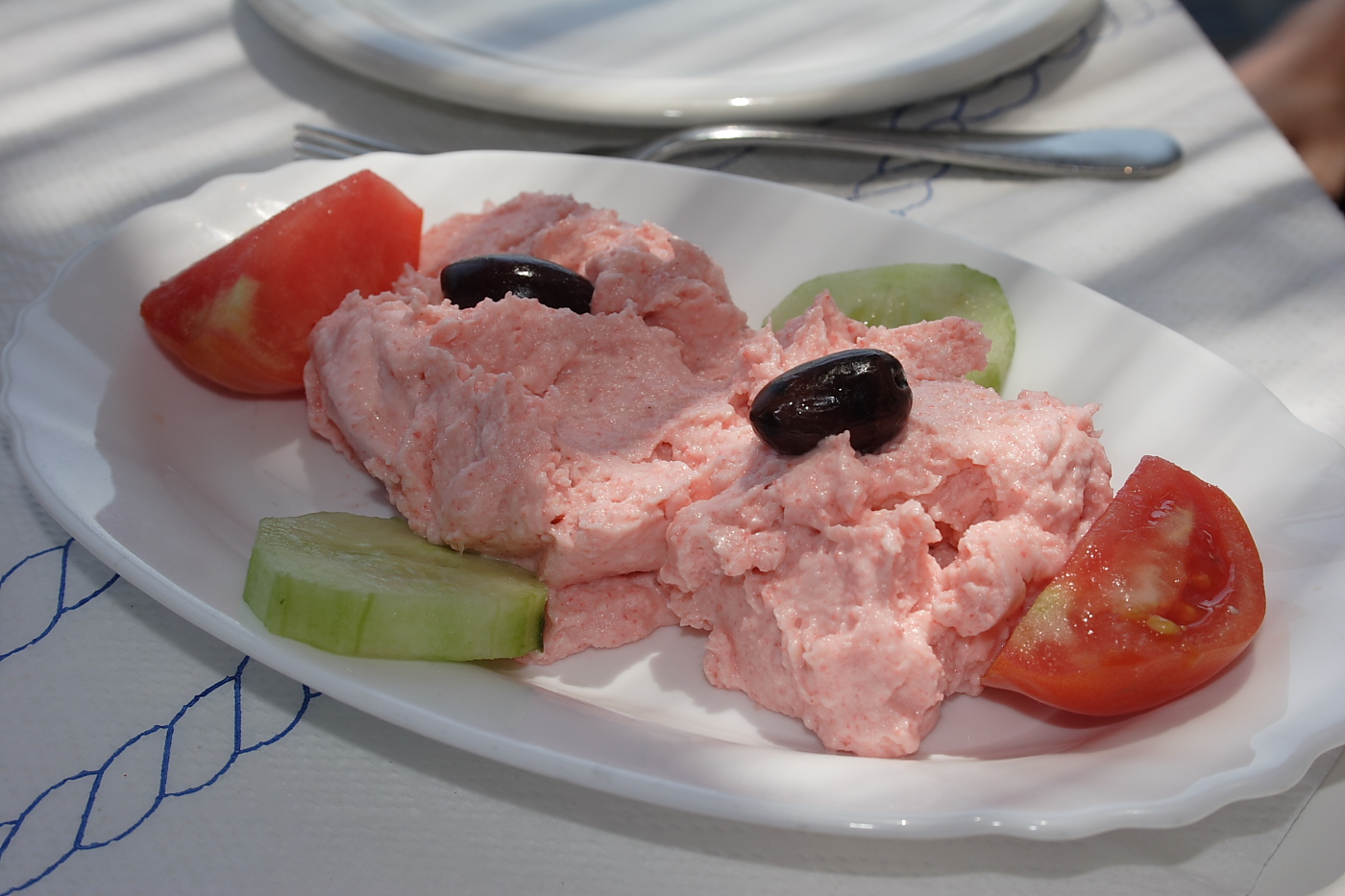
- A plate of taramasalata with garnishes
- Type: Spread
- Course: Meze
- Place of origin: Greece, Turkey
- Main ingredients: Tarama (salted and cured roe of cod or carp), bread crumbs or mashed potatoes, lemon juice or vinegar, olive oil

Taramasalata (Note: Also known as taramosalata) (Greek: ταραμοσαλάτα) or tarama (Turkish: [ta.ɾa.ˈma]), also known as salată de icre (Romanian: [saˈlatə de ˈikre]), is a meze made from a salted and cured roe (colloquially referred to as caviar) of the cod, carp, or grey mullet (bottarga), mixed with olive oil, lemon juice, and a starchy base of bread or potatoes, or sometimes almonds.

Traditionally the dish is made with a pestle and mortar, giving a slightly grainy texture, but commercial taramasalata is usually very smooth.

Taramasalata is usually served as a meze, often with ouzo, as a spread on bread. The colour can vary from creamy beige to pink, depending on the type of roe and colourings used. Most taramasalata sold commercially is dyed pink, but high-quality taramasalata is beige.

In Greece, taramasalata is often served on Clean Monday (Καθαρά Δευτέρα, Kathará Deftéra), the first day of Great Lent, with onions and lemon.

== Etymology ==
The word taramasalata comes from the Greek taramas (Greek: ταραμάς), a borrowing from Turkish tarama ("soft roe").

Normally, tarama is the salted roe itself, but sometimes the prepared dish is also called tarama. The spelling taramosalata reflects the Greek, but in English the a spelling is common.

== History ==
By the late 19th century, tarama was recorded among the meals and appetizers (meze) sold in the meyhane culture of Istanbul. According to researcher Murat Doğan, tarama is one of the several classic tavern dishes that represents a Byzantine cultural contribution to modern Istabulite cuisine. Based on etymological grounds, American food writer and historian Gil Marks points to a Turkish origin for the dish.

While taramasalata was traditionally prepared with the roe of various fish, such as gray mullet, cod, and shad, it became primarily made from carp roe after Sephardic Jewish merchants popularized carp in the Balkans during the 16th century. This shift imparted a preferred pinkish-orange color to the dish, although the pink hue in many commercial brands is now achieved through artificial coloring.

== Variants ==
Variants may include garlic, spring onions, or peppers, or vinegar instead of lemon juice. While not traditionally Greek, smoked rather than cured cod's roe is more widely available in some places, and often used. Bottarga is usually much more expensive than cod roe.

The scandinavian spread known as Smörgåskaviar is almost identical to taramasalata. Some versions of the Scandinavian dish includes tomato paste as a coloring ingredient.

== Salată de icre ==
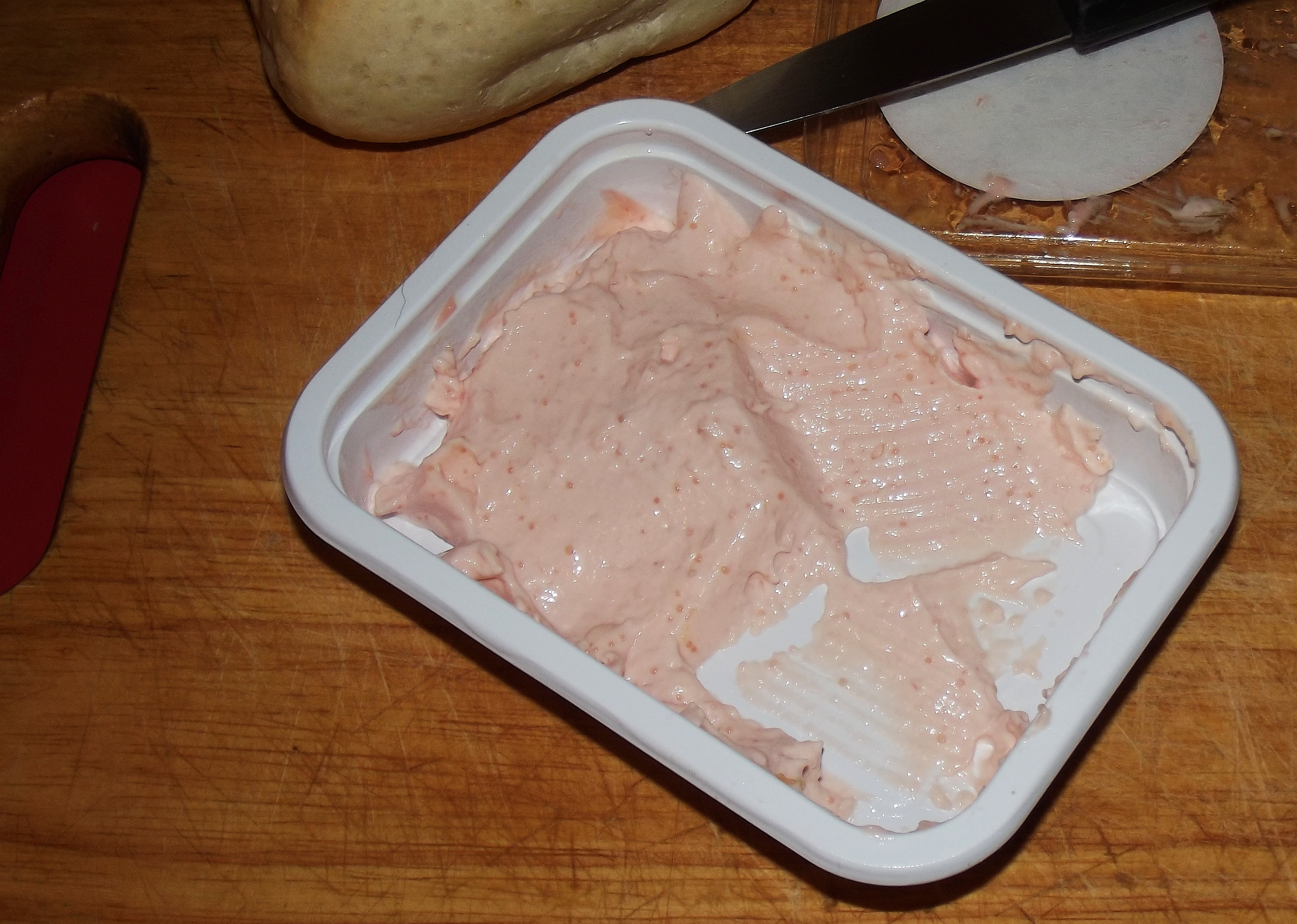
Salată de icre

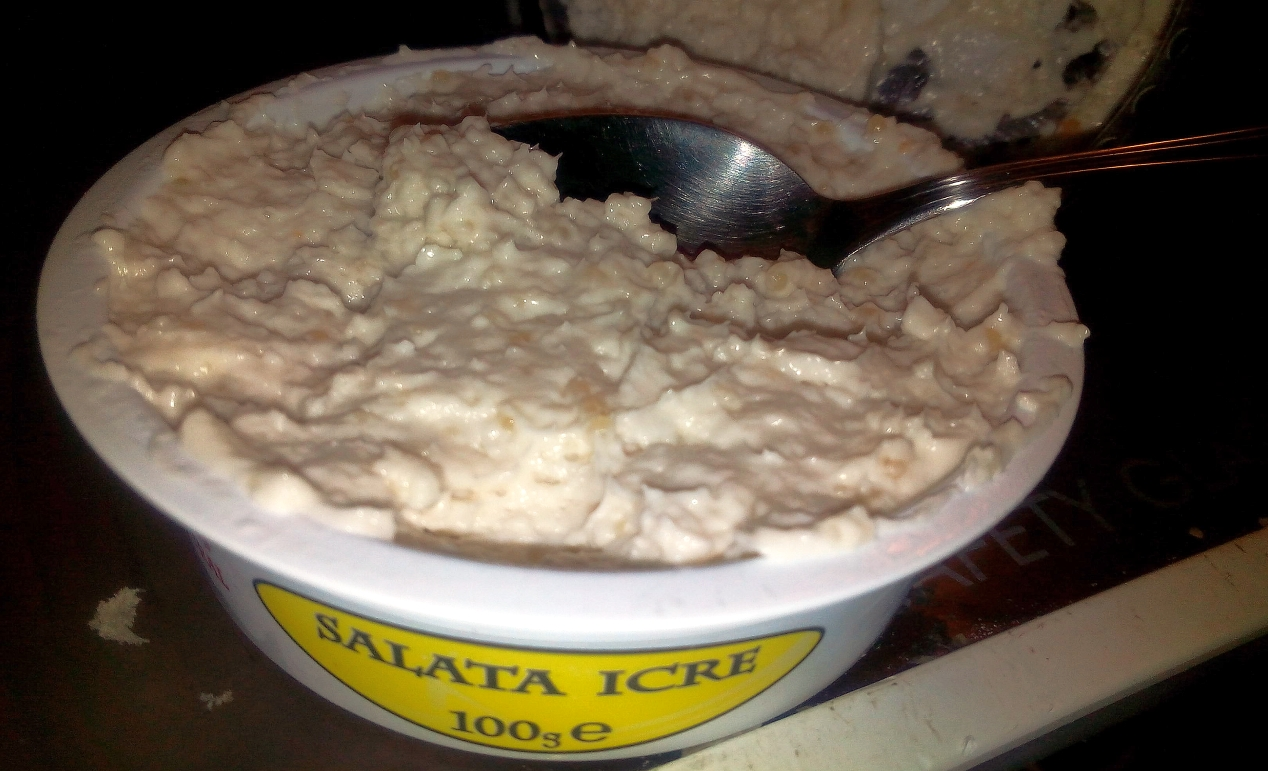
Pike egg version

A similar dip or spread, salată de icre ('roe salad' in Romanian) is also common in Romania, North Macedonia and Bulgaria (known as хайвер, or haiver), and Israel (where it is known as ikra). It is made with pike or carp roe, but generally with sunflower or vegetable oil instead of olive oil, sometimes with a thickener like white bread. It is mass-produced and is widely available in grocery shops and supermarkets, as well as being made at home, in which case chopped onions are commonly added. It has a consistency and taste similar to mayonnaise, with the roe taking the place of the egg as protein. The traditional production method of salată de icre is standardized under the Romanian departmental standard N.I.D. 927-70 N 23 and registered as an EU Traditional Speciality Guaranteed under the name "Salată tradițională cu icre de carp". The roe of this product is for over 50% carp based.

A dip, fasole bătută or fasole făcăluită (mashed beans), prepared with mashed beans, sunflower oil, garlic and chopped onions, is sometimes called icre de fasole (beans roe).

== See also ==
- List of condiments
- Spread (food)
