= Karasumi =

Japanese fish-based food item

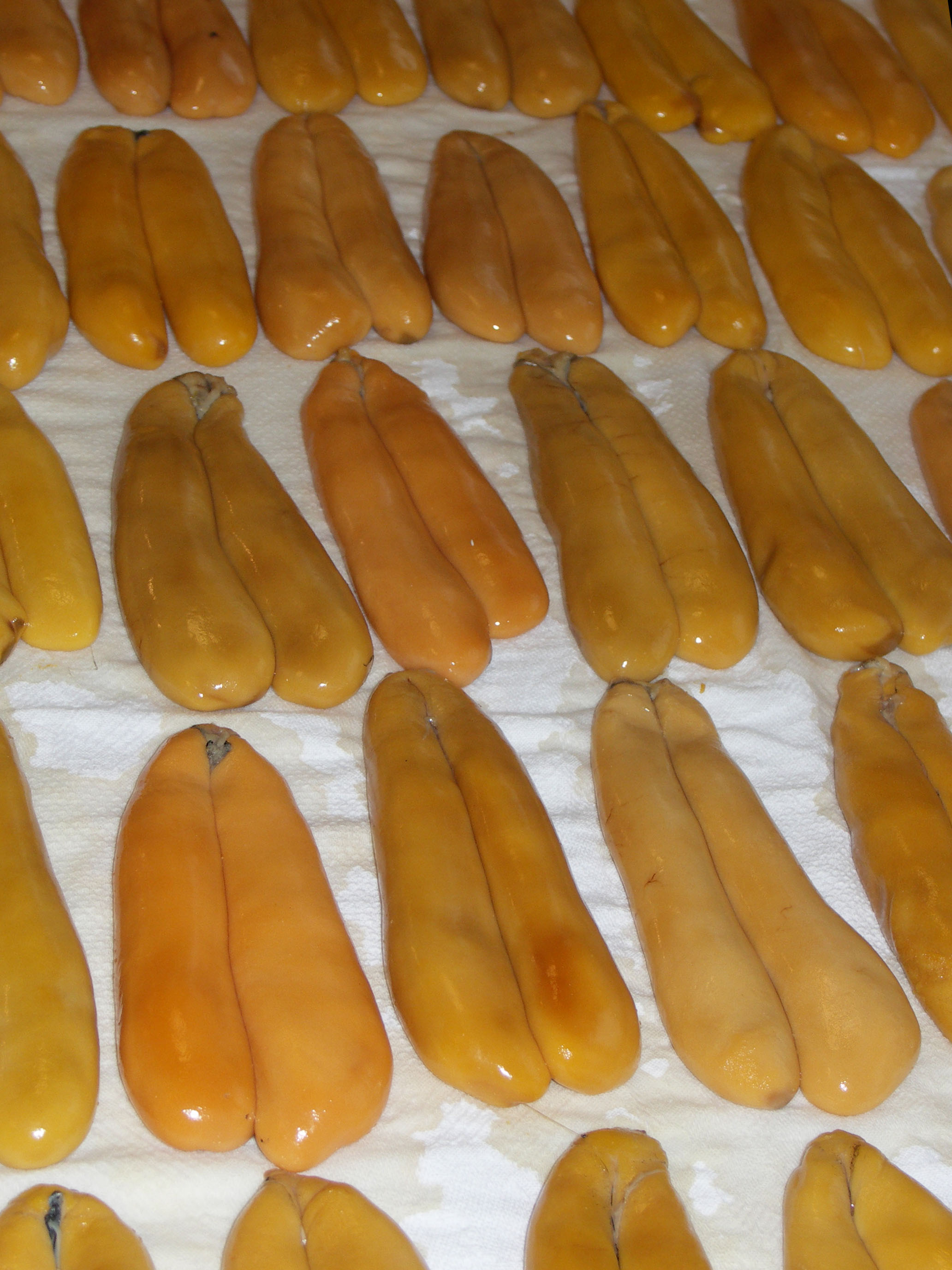
- Mullet roe drying. The roe sac is deveined, and progressively pressed, dehydrated and salted until the desired firmness or texture is achieved. Mullet roe is considered a delicacy in Taiwan as well as in Japan.

Japanese name
- Kanji: 唐墨、鰡子、鱲子
- Hiragana: からすみ
- Katakana: カラスミ
Transcriptions
- Romanization: karasumi
Chinese name
- Chinese: 烏魚子
Transcriptions
Standard Mandarin
- Hanyu Pinyin: wūyú zǐ
Southern Min
- Hokkien POJ: o͘-hî-chí

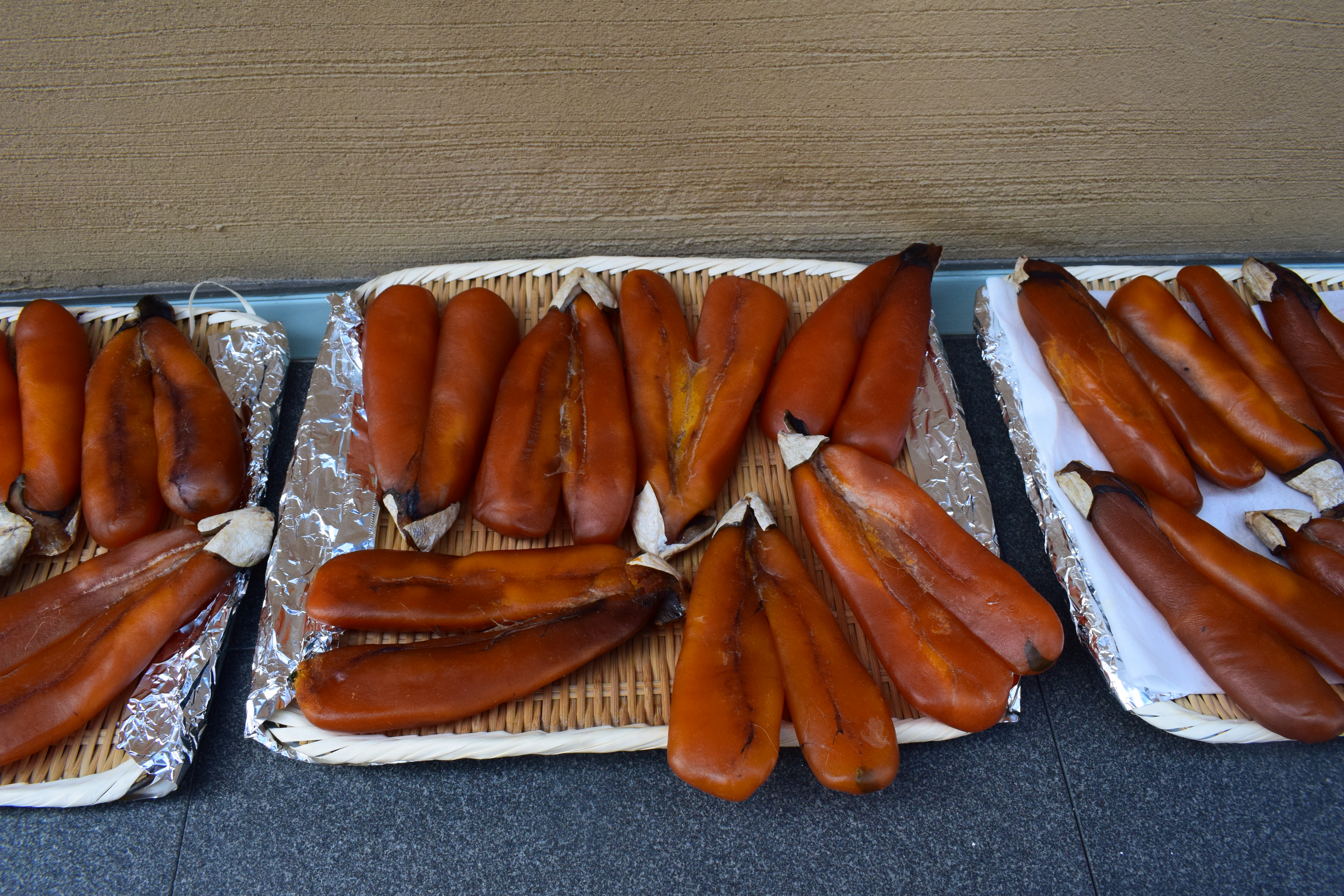
Karasumi drying in Tokyo

Karasumi (Japanese: からすみ (唐墨、鰡子、鱲子) or wūyú zǐ (Chinese: 烏魚子) is a food item made by salting mullet roe pouch and drying it in sunlight. It is a softer analog of Mediterranean bottarga.

== Japan ==
Karasumi is a high priced delicacy in Japan and it is eaten while drinking sake. A theory suggests that it got its name from its resemblance to the blocks of sumi (inkstick) imported from China (Kara) for use in Japanese calligraphy.

It is a specialty of Nagasaki and along with salt-pickled sea urchin roe and konowata one of the "three chinmi of Japan".

== Taiwan ==
The wūyú zǐ is almost always the roe pouch of the flathead grey mullet (Mugil cephalus). Mullet fishing in Taiwan can be traced back to when the island was under Dutch colonial rule. Early historical accounts, from the Taiwan Prefectural Gazetteer to the General History of Taiwan mention this delicacy.

Wūyú zǐ was traditionally only consumed seasonally—from December to January—when spawning mullet arrived at the island's southeastern coast. The delicacy came to be associated with the Lunar New Year that falls in January or February.

The town of Donggang in Pingtung County specializes in the delicacy.

== See also ==
- Bottarga
- Eoran
- List of delicacies
