= Kalles Kaviar =

Swedish brand of fish spread

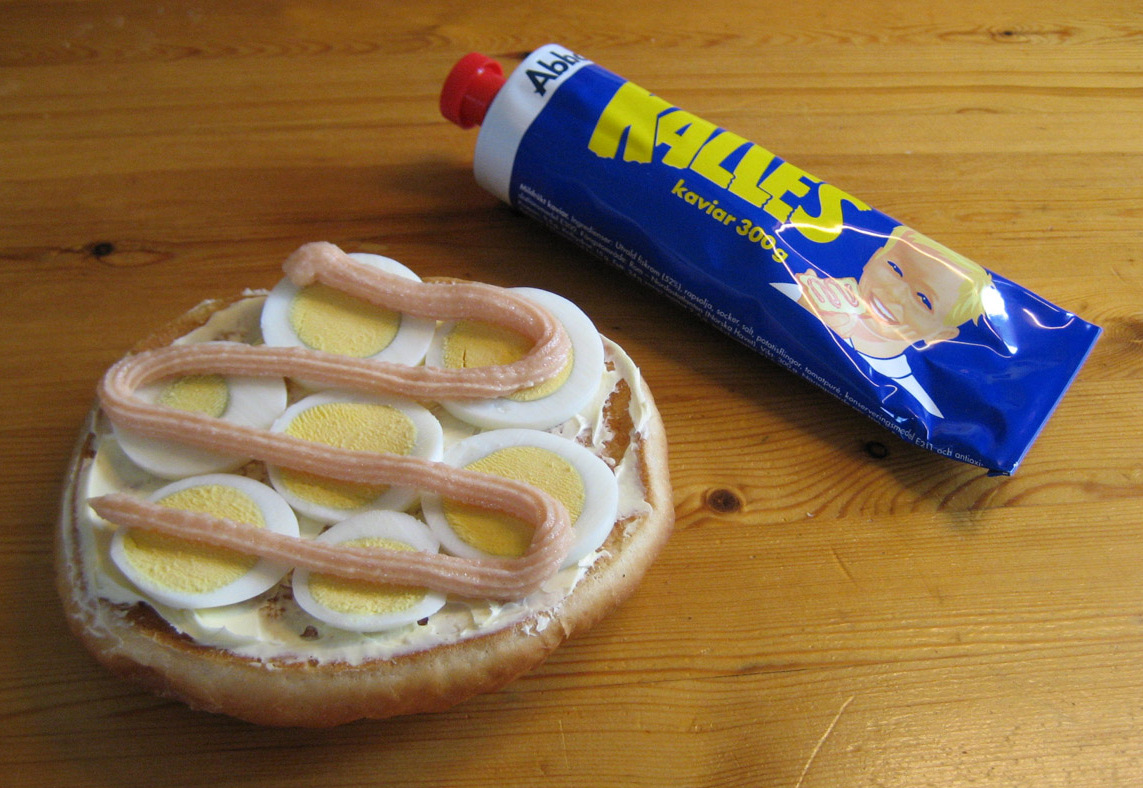
- Kalles kaviar on an egg sandwich.
- Type: Sandwich spread
- Place of origin: Sweden
- Created by: Abba Seafood
- Invented: 1954
- Main ingredients: Smoked sugared and salted cod and pollock roe, sugar, canola oil, potato flakes, tomato puree, salt, potassium sorbate, ascorbic acid
- Variations: Original; Vegan (seaweed caviar); Mild (milder taste); Light (less sugar and fat); Randiga ("Striped", with cream cheese or egg mix); Guld ("Gold", harsher smoked roe); KRAV (for sustainable fishing and agriculture)

Kalles, previously known as Kalles Kaviar, is a Swedish brand of smörgåskaviar, a type of sandwich spread made from roe.

It is manufactured by Abba Seafood. Kalles Kaviar is mainly made of smoked, sugared and salted cod and pollock roe, sugar, canola oil and potato flakes. It is officially credited as having been introduced in 1954, but probably existed even earlier as advertisement for the product appeared in newspapers as early as 1946. The product soon became considered a classic product in the Swedish market and is internationally recognised as a Swedish product.

The tube label has maintained nearly the same design from the beginning. It was suggested to then-CEO Christian Ameln by the advertiser Claes Mörner that the CEO's son Carl should be the one depicted on the new product, as they had already agreed that it should be a boy and they'd by now named the mascot Kalle, a common nickname used for men and boys named Carl (Karl) and a popular name during the 1950's.

The tube had to be made of aluminium rather than plastic as the product doesn't remain fresh for long when in contact with air, as plastic containers tend to suck in air when the contents are squeezed out aluminium was picked instead as it collapses and remains in the form it was pressed into.

In 2011, IKEA replaced Kalles Kaviar with its own brand of caviar. This led to backlash, leading to IKEA returning the product to its shelves within a few years.

In the 21st century, the Swedish smörgåskaviar market has fractured, with each supermarket chain promoting its own brand.

== Product name ==
Having kaviar (English: caviar) in the product name has at times been controversial as it can supposedly be confused with other caviar types, such as Russian caviar.

Although the original product was called Kalles Kaviar in Sweden, it was changed to Kalles in the 21st century. In Finland the name is translated to Kallen Mätitahna which means Kalle's roe paste as the word kaviar was only allowed to be used when referring to sturgeon roe.
