= Simeon Seth =

Byzantine polymath

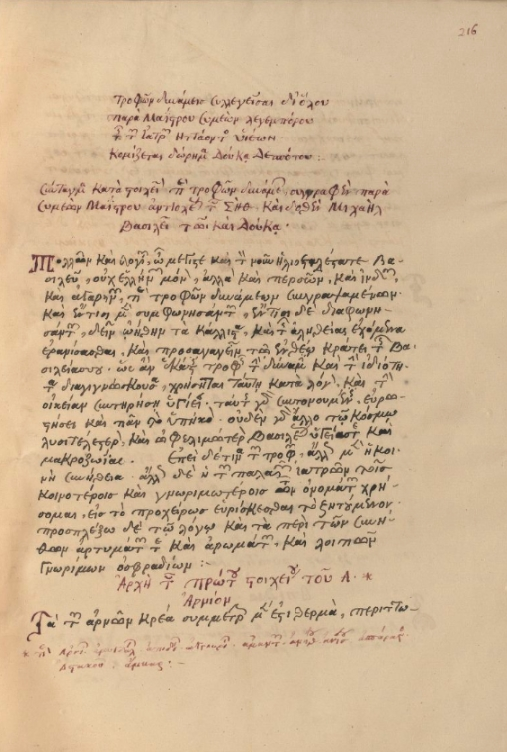
First page of Simeon Seth's dietary manual: BNF MS suppl. grec 634, f. 216r

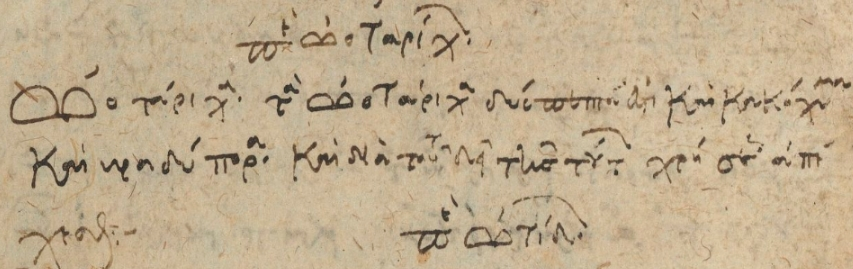
Simeon Seth's instruction on botargo: avoid it totally. BNF MS suppl. grec 634, f. 254v detail

Symeon Seth (Note: Greek: Συμεὼν Μάγιστρος Ἀντιοχείας ὁ Σηθί, "Symeōn Magister of Antioch [son?] of Sēth". His first name may also be spelled Simeon or Simeo.) (c. 1035 – c. 1110) was a Byzantine scientist, translator, and official under Emperor Michael VII Doukas. He is often said to have been Jewish, but there is no evidence for this. Either of Jewish background, or Jacobite, or Nestorian, or a Rūm, Symeon was definitely a non-Muslim Syrian. He wrote four original works in Greek and translated one from Arabic, and offered early proofs that the Earth was round.

== Life ==
Symeon was originally from Antioch. His second name, gives as Seth (Σήθ) or Sethi (Σήθι), may be a patronymic (indicating his father was named Seth) but is more probably a family name. The manuscripts of his works describe him as a philosopher and give him the titles magistros and vestes. These titles were losing their significance in Byzantium at the time; they tend to indicate an official of middling rank.

During the reign of Isaac I Komnenos, Symeon witnessed a total solar eclipse in Egypt on either 23 February 1058 or 15 February 1059. Probably he moved to Constantinople around 1071. There he sought the patronage of Michael VII and entered into literary competition with fellow polymath Michael Psellos.

According to the Alexiad (c.1148), the Emperor Alexios I Komnenos asked Symeon to translate the Arabic fable collection Kalīlah wa Dimnah into Greek. The Alexiad describes him as a mathematician and astrologer capable of predicting the future through calculations. He supposedly predicted the death of Robert Guiscard (17 July 1085). For a time he fell out of imperial favour and was imprisoned in Raidestos.

Around 1112, Symeon appears to have sold a gospel book bound between wood covers to the monastery founded by Michael Attaleiates in Constantinople. He probably died not long after. No letters written by or to Symeon survive. Nor is there evidence that he ever practiced medicine, as commonly stated.

== Works ==
He revised Psellos's Σύνταγμα κατὰ στοιχείων περὶ τροφῶν δυνάμεων (Note: TLG no. 3113.002) (Latin Syntagma de alimentorum facultatibus or De cibariorum facultate, "On the Properties of Foods"), which criticizes Galen and emphasizes eastern medical traditions. Paul Moore says "the text is really an explanation of Aetius Amidenus Iatricorum libri xvi, with material drawn from Dioscorides Liber de alimentis. Apparently, Psellos wrote the work for the emperor Constantine IX Monomachos. It was then revised for Michael VII Doukas by Symeon Seth, who wrote a brief introduction (the proem.), made some corrections in the text, omitting some chapters. The work deals with some two hundred and twenty-eight plants and animals." The Syntagma is an important source for Byzantine cuisine and dietetics.

Simeon's work Σύνοψις τῶν φυσικῶν (Note: TLG no. 3113.003) (Conspectus rerum naturalium, "On the things of nature") is a treatise on the natural sciences divided into five books. The first concerns the earth; the second, the elements; the third, the sky and the stars; the fourth, matter, form, nature and the soul (sense perception); the fifth, the final cause and divine providence. The work is heavily influenced by the philosophy of Aristotle.

He learned astronomy from Arabic sources and translated the book of fables Kalīlah wa Dimnah from Arabic to Greek in about 1080. The protagonists in the Greek version (Note: TLG no. 3113.001) are named "Stephanites" and "Ichnelates".

Seth advanced several proofs that the earth was spherical. He noted that since the sun rises in the east before it sets in the west, it can be afternoon in Persia when it is still morning in Byzantine lands. He points out that the same eclipse that was recorded as having taken place in the afternoon by the Persians was recorded in the morning by the Greeks. Nautical and astronomical proofs are also given.
