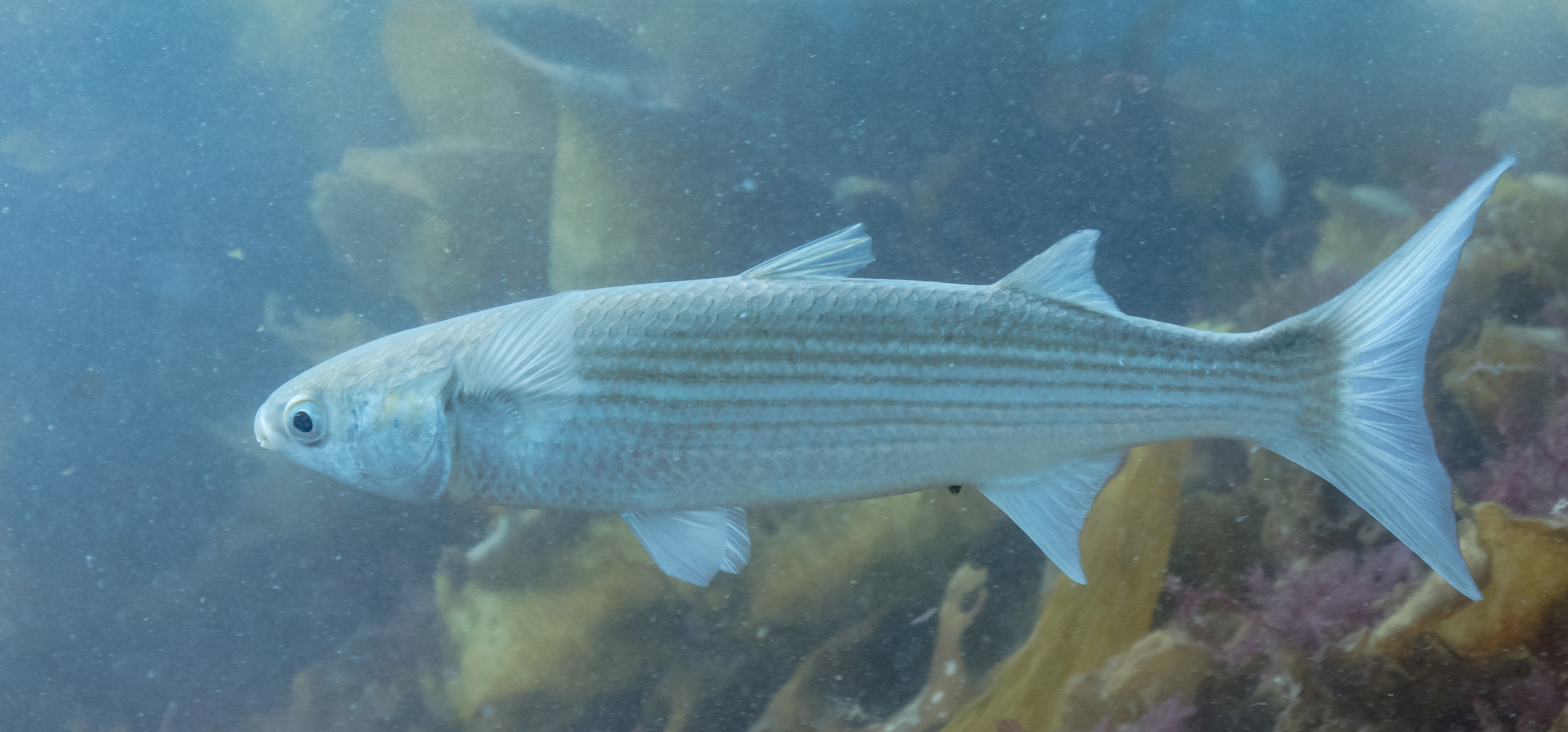

Conservation status
- Least Concern (IUCN 3.1)

Scientific classification
- Kingdom: Animalia
- Phylum: Chordata
- Class: Actinopterygii
- Division: Teleostei
- Order: Mugiliformes
- Family: Mugilidae
- Genus: Mugil
- Species: M. cephalus

Binomial name
- Mugil cephalus Linnaeus, 1758

Synonyms
- Mugil albula Linnaeus, 1766; Mugil our Forsskål, 1775; Mugil tang Bloch, 1794; Mugil provensalis Risso, 1810; Mugil lineatus Valenciennes, 1836; Mugil cephalotus Valenciennes, 1836; Mugil japonicus Temminck & Schlegel, 1845; Mugil rammelsbergii Tschudi, 1846; Mugil vulpinus Nardo, 1847; Mugil dobula Günther, 1861; Mugil ashanteensis Bleeker, 1863; Myxus superficialis Klunzinger, 1870; Mugil gelatinosus Klunzinger, 1872; Myxus caecutiens Günther, 1876; Mugil mexicanus Steindachner, 1876; Mugil grandis Castelnau, 1879; Mugil muelleri Klunzinger, 1879

= Flathead grey mullet =

Striped mullet

Species of fish

The striped mullet (Mugil cephalus) is an important food fish species in the mullet family Mugilidae. It is found in coastal temperate, subtropical, and tropical waters worldwide. Its length is typically 30 to 75 centimetres (12 to 30 in). It is known with numerous English names, including the flathead mullet, flathead grey mullet, striped mullet, black mullet, bully mullet, common mullet, grey mullet, sea mullet, and mullet.

The striped mullet is a mainly diurnal coastal species that often enters estuaries and rivers. It usually schools over sand or mud bottoms, feeding on zooplankton, dead plant matter, microalgae, and detritus. The adult fish normally feed on algae in fresh water. The species is euryhaline, meaning they can acclimate to different levels of salinity.

== Etymology ==
The generic name Mugil is from Latin: mūgil: "mullet". The specific name cephalus is from Ancient Greek: κέφαλος képhalos: "mullet". Thus, the binomial term Mugil cephalus literally means "Mullet mullet".

== Description ==
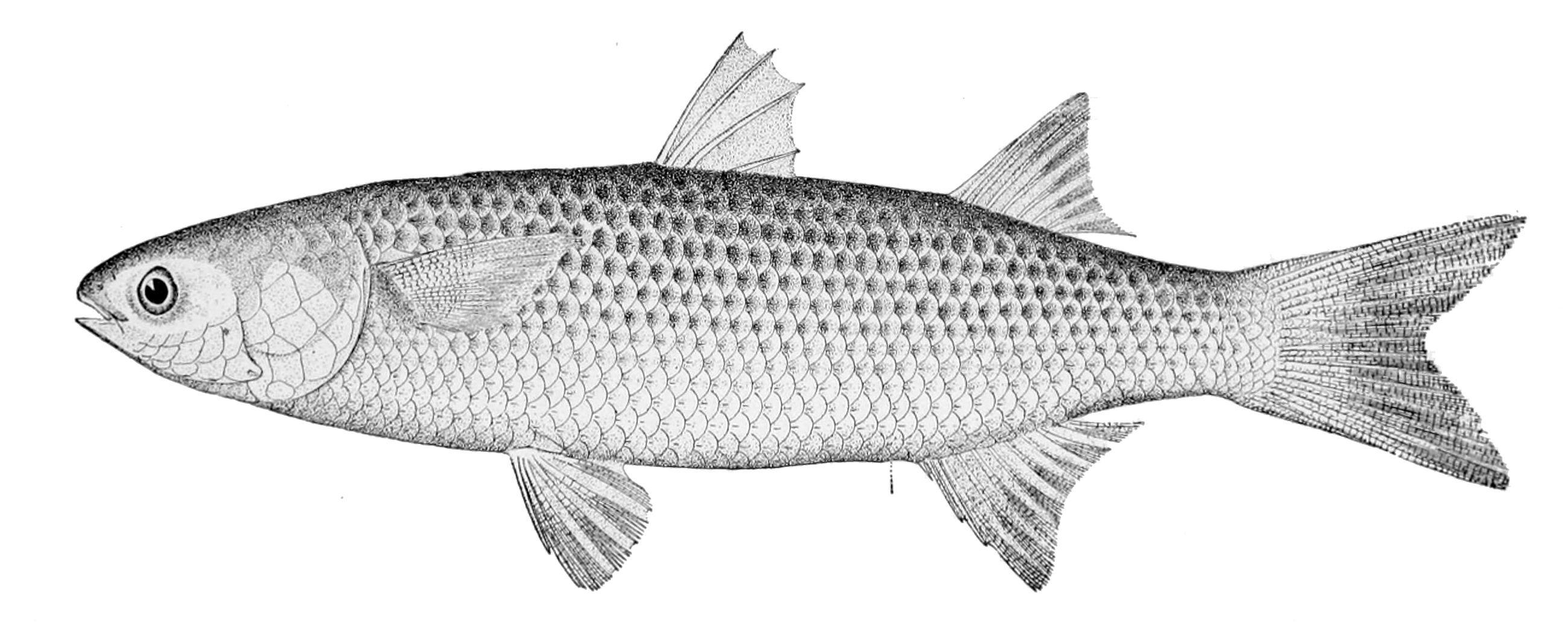

The back of the fish is olive-green; the sides are silvery and shade to white towards the belly. The fish may have six or seven distinctive, lateral, horizontal stripes. Lips are thin. The mullet has no lateral line. A common length is about 50 cm (20 in) and its maximum length is 100 cm (39 in). It can reach a maximum weight of 8 kg (18 lb).

== Distribution ==
The striped mullet is cosmopolitan in coastal waters of the tropical, subtropical, and temperate zones of all seas, as far north as the Bay of Biscay and Nova Scotia in the Atlantic Ocean. It occupies fresh, brackish and marine habitats in depths ranging from 0–120 metres (0–394 ft) and with temperatures between 8 and 24 °C (46 and 75 °F).

In Australia, this fish is widespread, from Far North Queensland, around southern Australia to the Kimberley region of Western Australia. It also occurs in the Bass Strait area of Tasmania. It lives in tropical and temperate, coastal marine and estuarine waters, but are also often found in the lower reaches of rivers. It is able to live in a wide range of salinity, so may also be found in lagoons, lakes, and far into estuaries, but migrate back to the sea to spawn.

In fresh waters of the western United States, striped mullets historically ranged far up the Colorado River to the vicinity of Blythe and up the Gila River to perhaps Tacna. Because of the dams and restricted flows to the Gulf of California, their range in Arizona is restricted to the Colorado River below Laguna Dam and the lower end of the Gila River when water is present. They are often abundant in the mainstream and lateral canals in the Gila River region.

In the Colorado River, mullet are pelagic in larger pools, sometimes moving into currents below dams, and generally occurring in small groups. Striped mullet populations are currently declining in Arizona, due to periods when the Colorado River does not reach the Gulf of California.

== Fisheries and aquaculture ==
Capture (blue) and aquaculture (green) production of flathead grey mullet (Mugil cephalus) in thousand tonnes from 1950 to 2024, as reported by the Food and Agriculture Organization.

The striped mullet is an important food fish around the world, and it is both fished and farmed. The reported worldwide production in 2024 reached about 125,000 tonnes, of which 5% came from aquaculture.

== Development ==
The ontogeny of mugilid larvae has been well studied, with the larval development of M. cephalus in particular being studied intensively due to its wide range of distribution and interest to aquaculture. The previously understudied osteological development of M. cephalus was investigated in a 2021 study, with four embryonic and six larval developmental steps being described in aquaculture-reared and wild-caught specimens. These descriptions provided clarification of questionable characters of adult mullets and revealed informative details with potential implications for phylogenetic hypotheses, as well as providing an overdue basis of comparison for aquaculture-reared mullets to enable recognition of malformations.

== Cuisine ==
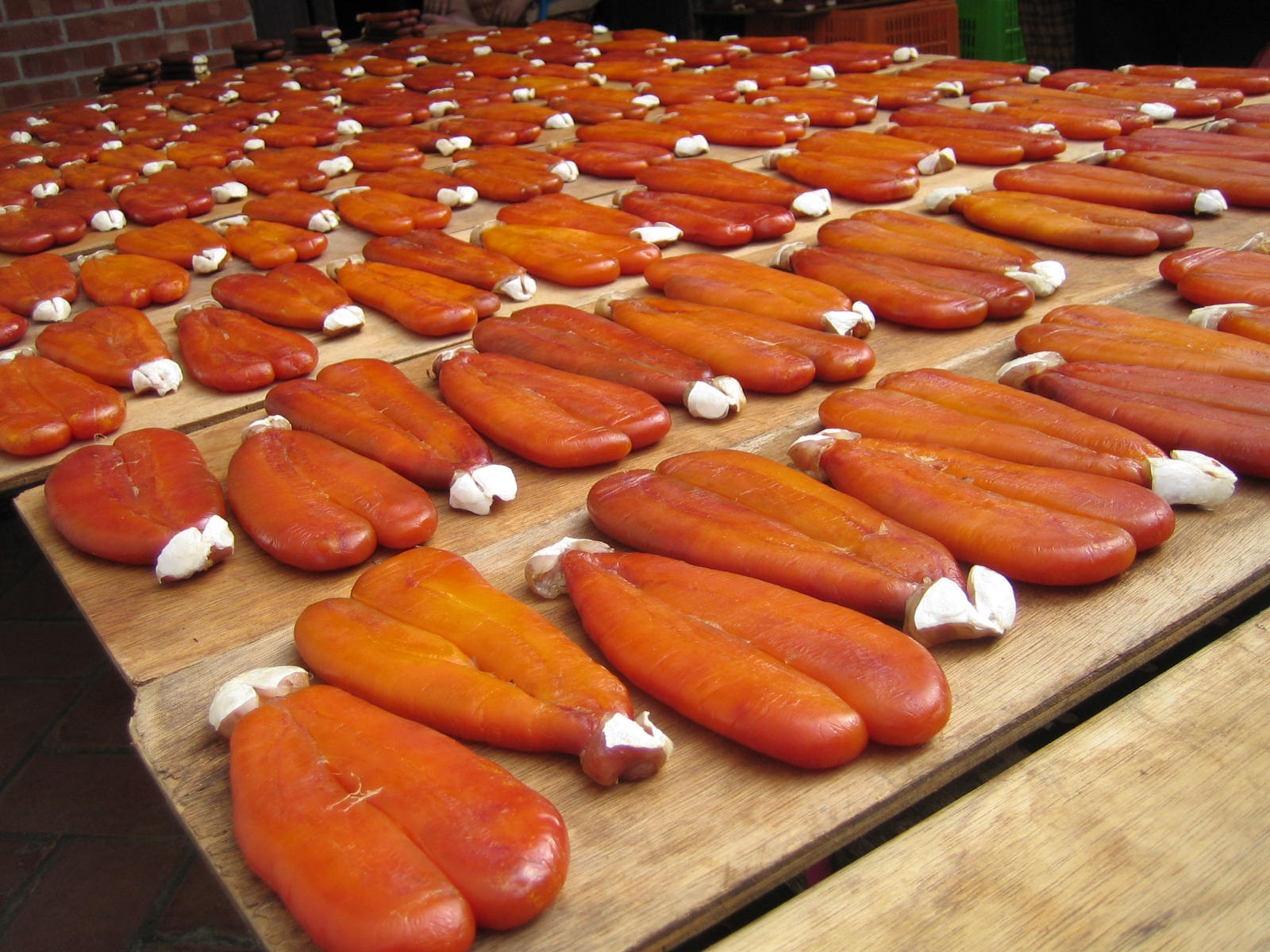
Drying mullet roe in Taiwan.

The roe of this mullet is salted, dried, and compressed to make a specialty food across the world, such as Greek avgotaraho, Taiwanese wuyutsu, Korean eoran, Japanese karasumi, Italian bottarga, French poutargue, Turkish haviar, and Egyptian batarekh. In Egypt, the fish itself is salted, dried, and pickled to make fesikh.

On the coast of Northwest Florida and Alabama, this mullet, called the striped or black mullet, is often a specialty of seafood restaurants. Fried mullet is most popular, but smoked, baked, and canned mullet are also eaten. Local fishermen usually catch mullet in a castnet, though most use a land-based seine net. Mullet is a delicacy in this area and is most often consumed in the home. Mullets are usually filleted, and the remaining frames used for fish stock in chowders and stews. The mullet most commonly consumed in Florida, though, is the white mullet (Mugil curema), because its preference for cleaner water gives it a cleaner and less muddy taste.
