= Abba Seafood =

Swedish company producing preserved fish products

Abba Seafood AB
- Company type: Joint-stock company
- Founded: 1838
- Founder: Christian Gerhard Ameln
- Headquarters: Gothenburg, Sweden
- Key people: Johan Sundelin (CEO)
- Revenue: SEK 1.266 billion (2011)
- Total assets: 1.158 billion
- Total equity: 531.152 USD
- Owner: Orkla ASA
- Number of employees: about 391 (2012)
- Parent: Eiser Company
- Website: www.abba.se

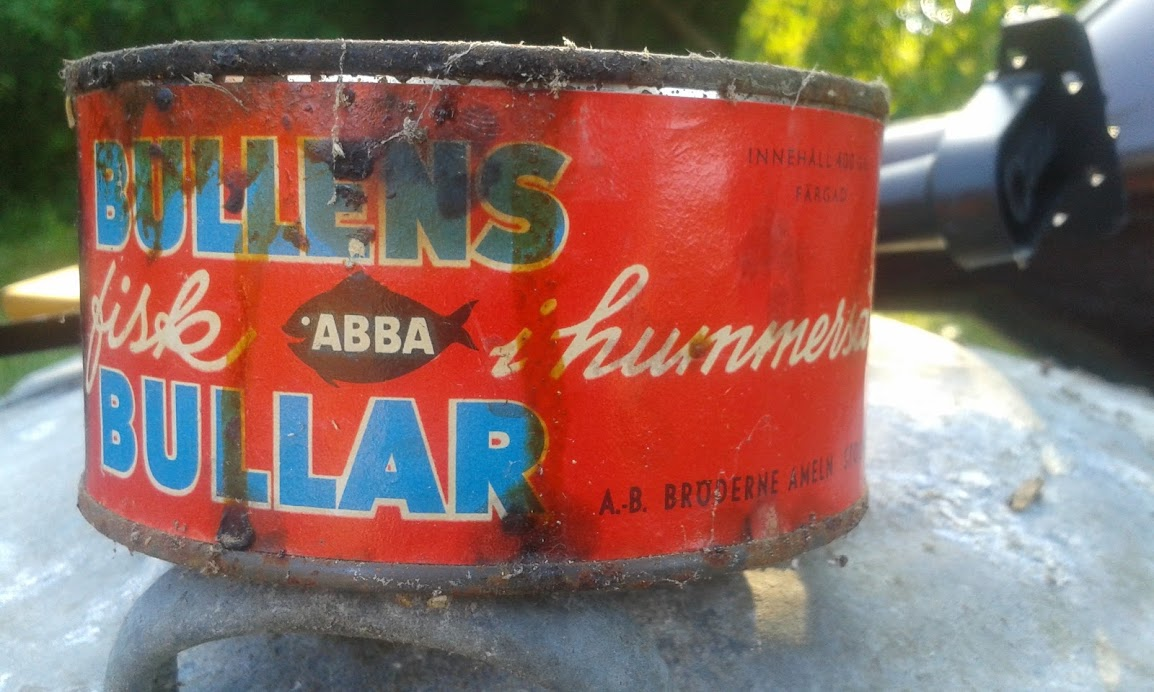
Canned fish produced by Abba Seafood

Abba Seafood AB, formerly Abba AB, with head offices in Gothenburg, Sweden, is a company producing preserved fish products. The main factory is located in Kungshamn.

The company was established in Bergen 1838 and in the 1850s it moved to Stockholm. The name Aktiebolaget Bröderna Ameln, Abba, was registered in 1906. In 1981, it was merged into Volvo, was sold to Procordia and is since 1995 a part of the Norwegian Orkla ASA. Abba has also acquired competitors such as Bohusräkor AB, Glyngøre and Limfjordskompaniet. In 2005, Abba acquired AB Hållöfisk, which has been involved in the processing of shrimp and crayfish since 1946. Production sites were previously located in Rösholmen and Uddevalla. In 2013, Abba Seafood was acquired by Orkla Foods Sverige AB.

Some of the company's best-known products include the fish roe paste Kalles kaviar and Abba pickled herring.

The Swedish pop group ABBA are not connected to the company, but in 1974 the group's manager contacted Abba AB to confirm that there would not be any issues around them using the same name.

== See also ==
- List of seafood companies
