= Eoran =

Salted fish roe in Korean cuisine

Eoran (Korean: 어란; Hanja: 魚卵) is fish roe such as mullet- or croaker-roe that is marinated in soy sauce while still in the ovary and then half-dried in the sun. It is considered a delicacy in Korean cuisine.

== Pictures ==
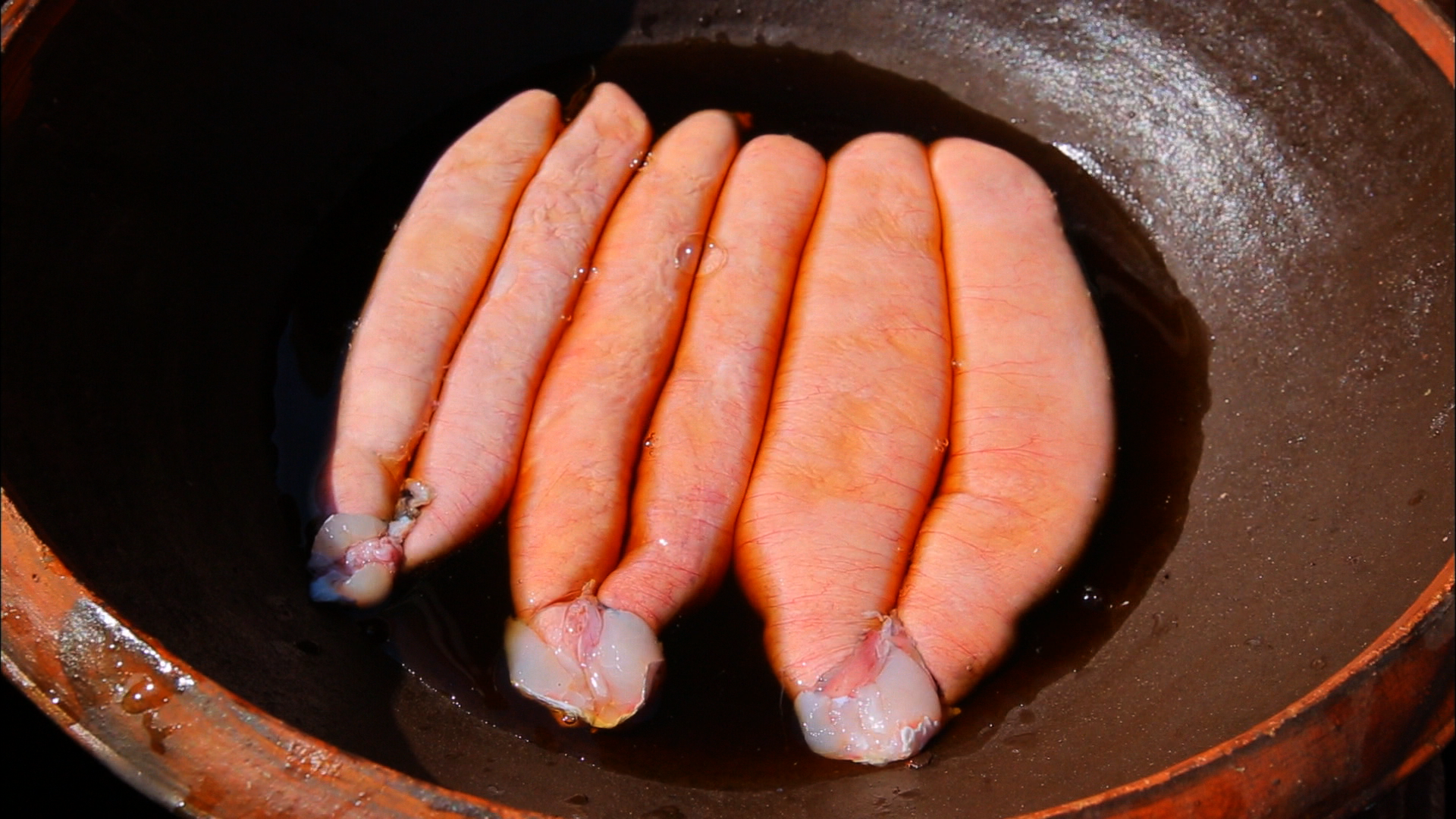
Marinating eoran in soy sauce seasoning

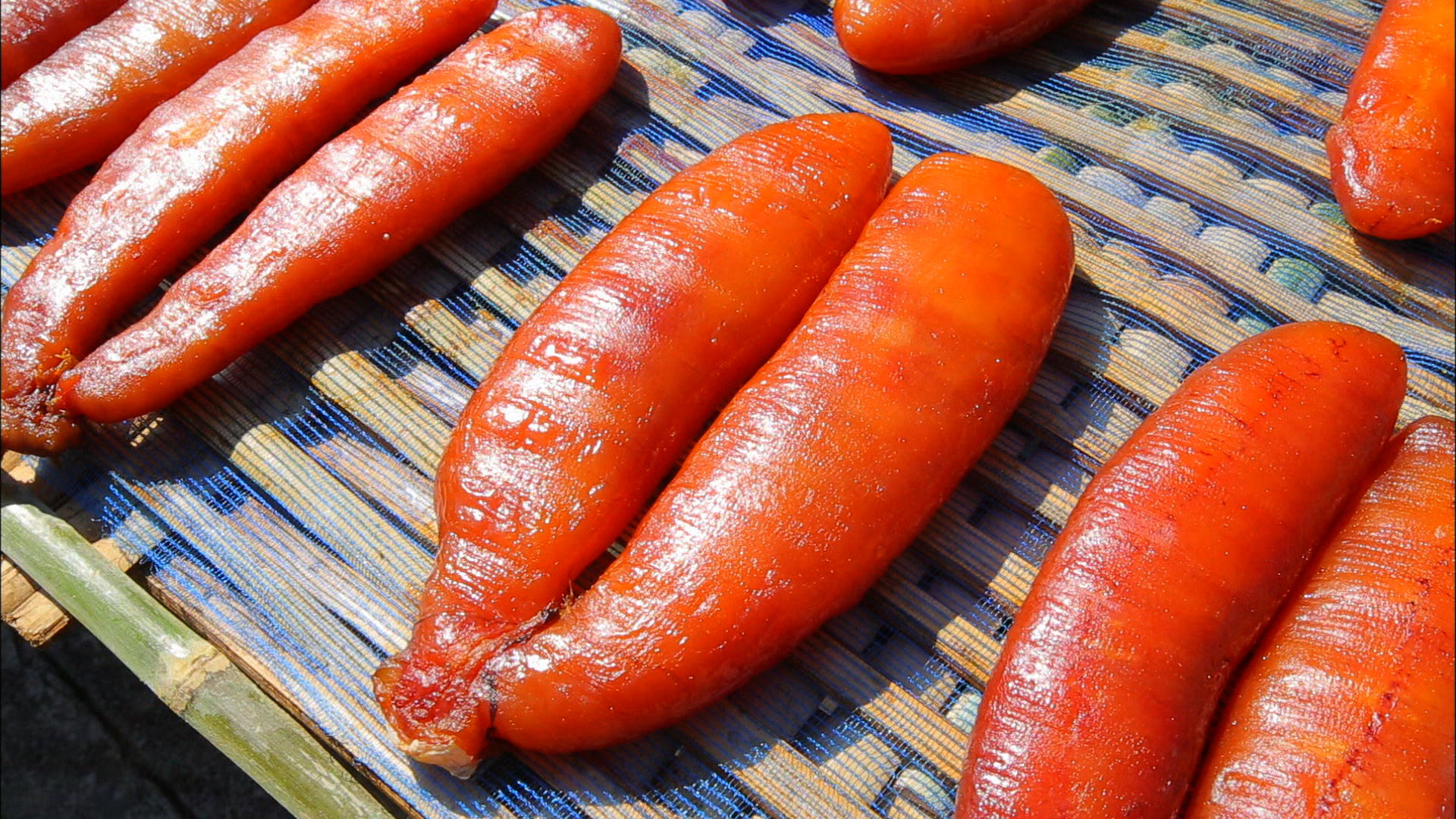
Drying eoran, during which it is brushed with sesame oil

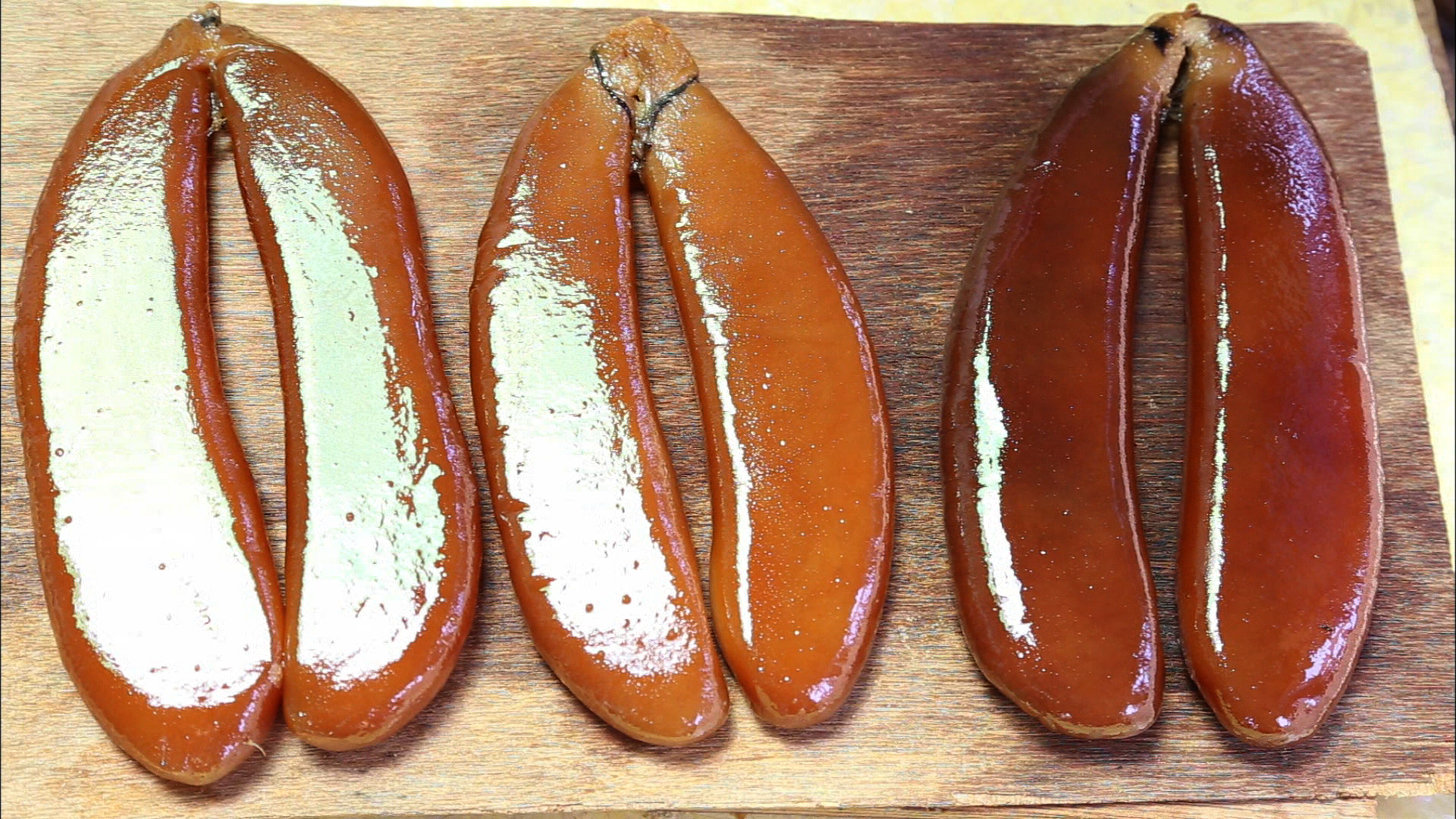
Yeongam eoran

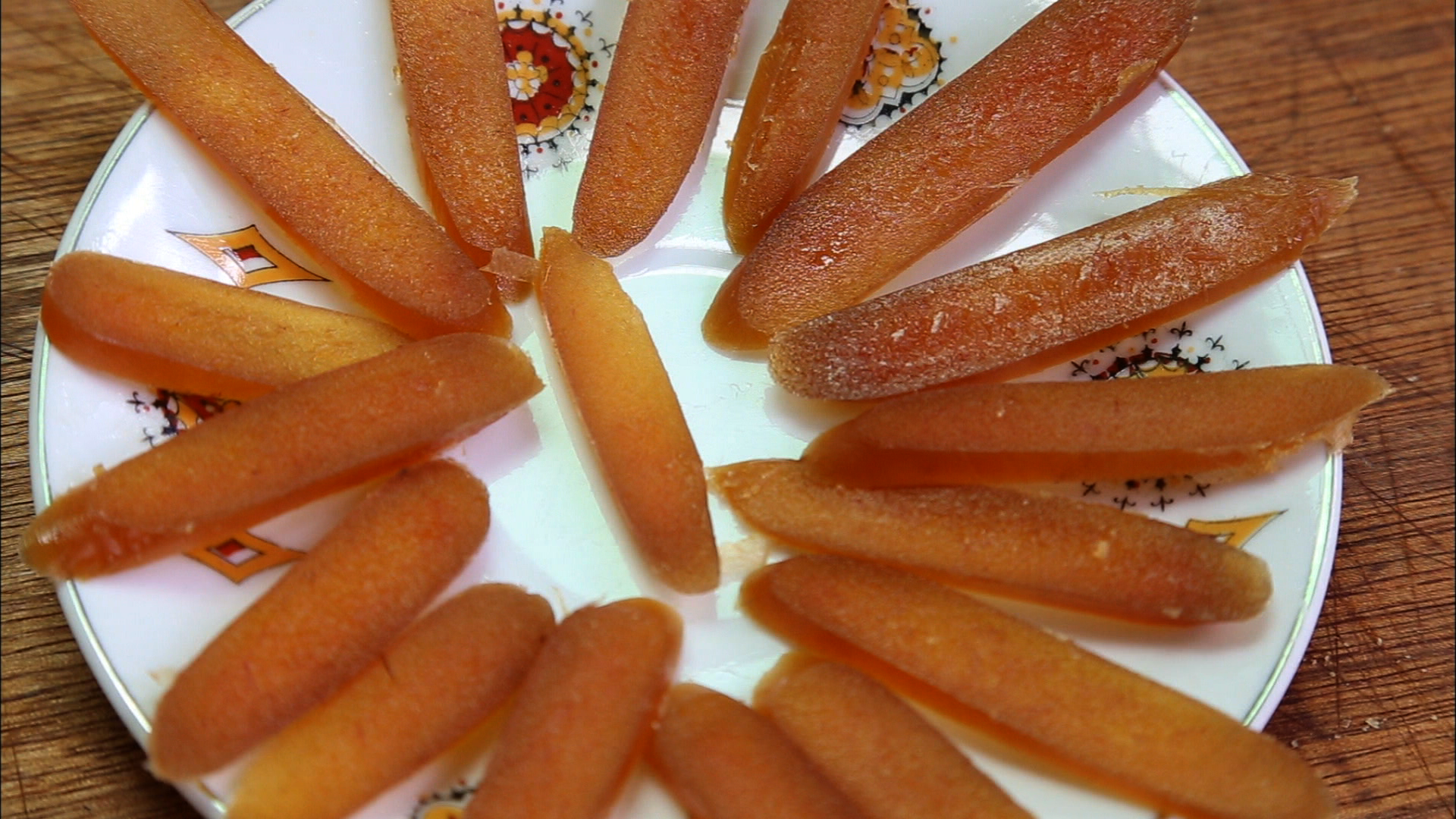
Sliced eoran

== See also ==
- Bottarga
- Karasumi
