= Smörgåskaviar =

Scandinavian caviar substitute

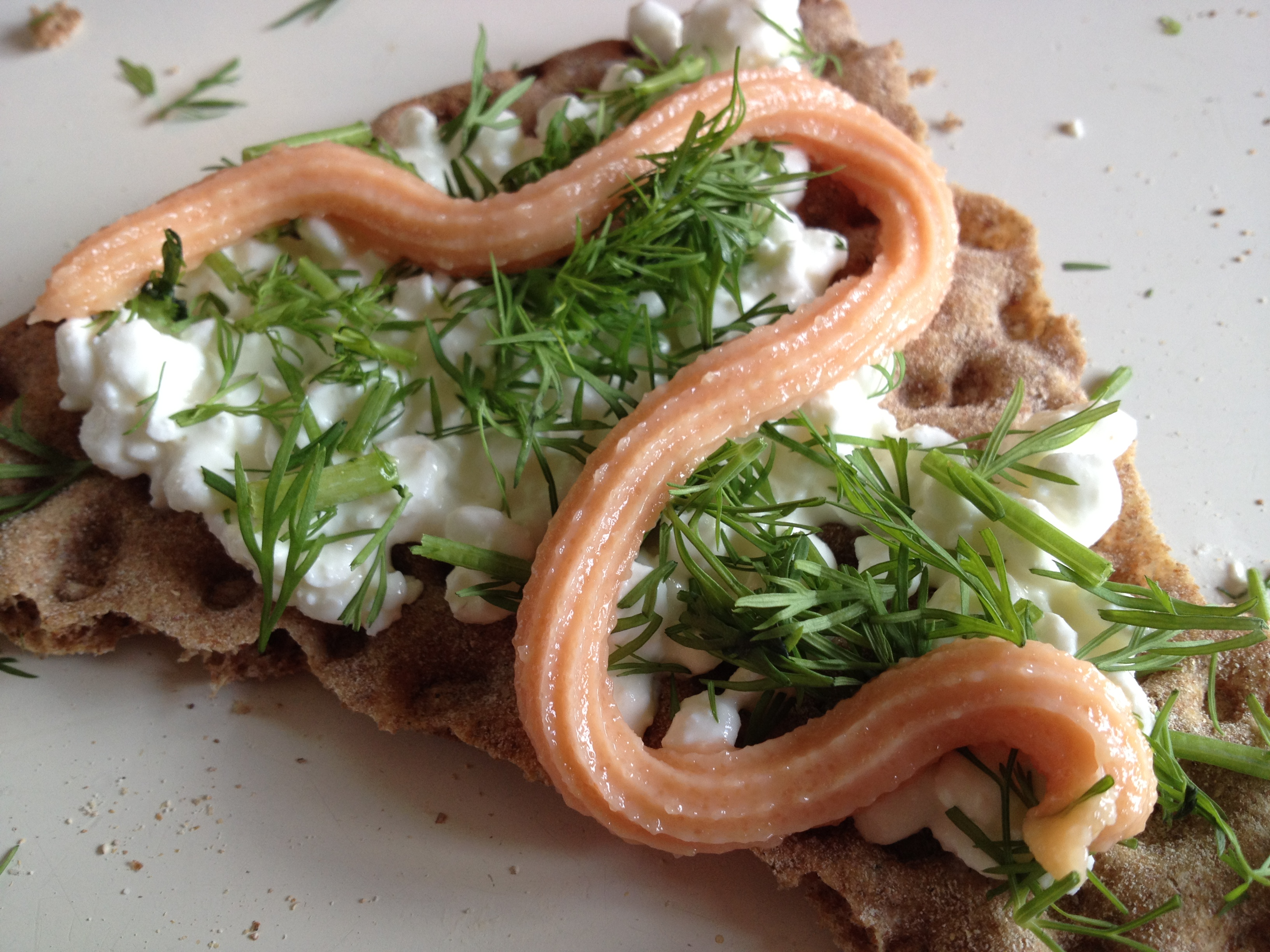
Smörgåskaviar as a condiment on a crispbread with cottage cheese and dill.

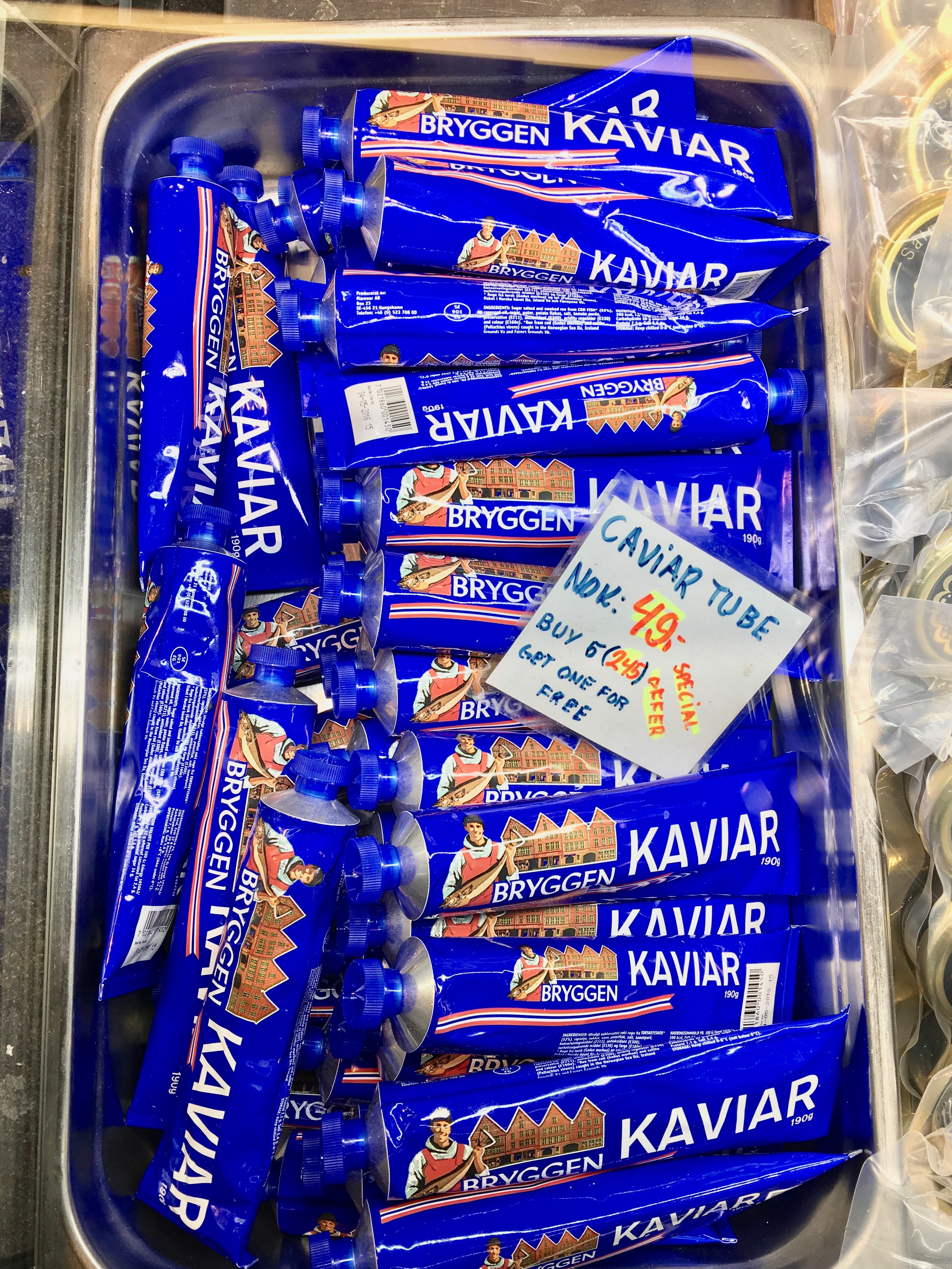
Tubes containing smörgåskaviar in Norway.

Smörgåskaviar ('sandwich caviar') is the Swedish word for a fish roe-based spread eaten in the Nordic countries and released in the 1950s. Despite its name, smörgåskaviar is not actual caviar, i.e. sturgeon roe. Instead, it is a paste made most often from cod roe and a variable mix of other ingredients. Whole roe is aged for up to two years in barrels in which the roe is layered with sugar, salt, and a sugar-salt brine, and turned regularly. After brining, it is smoked and then processed further. It is emulsified with oil such as rapeseed, soybean or cod oil. Other ingredients are added including potato flakes, tomato sauce, vinegar, onion, sugar, salt and sometimes dill or chives. The final paste contains 30–60% roe. It is sold in tubes in smoked and non-smoked variants. Some product variants also include processed cheese.

The spread is very similar to the greek dish Taramosalata. Versions of smoked cod roe combined with oil, spices and bread or potato flakes are also common in other balkan nations as well as Turkey.

Smörgåskaviar is mostly used on bread or a hardboiled egg.

== See also ==
- Kalles Kaviar, a brand of smörgåskaviar
- List of smoked foods
