= Fasole bătută =

Vegetarian bean paste eaten during Lent

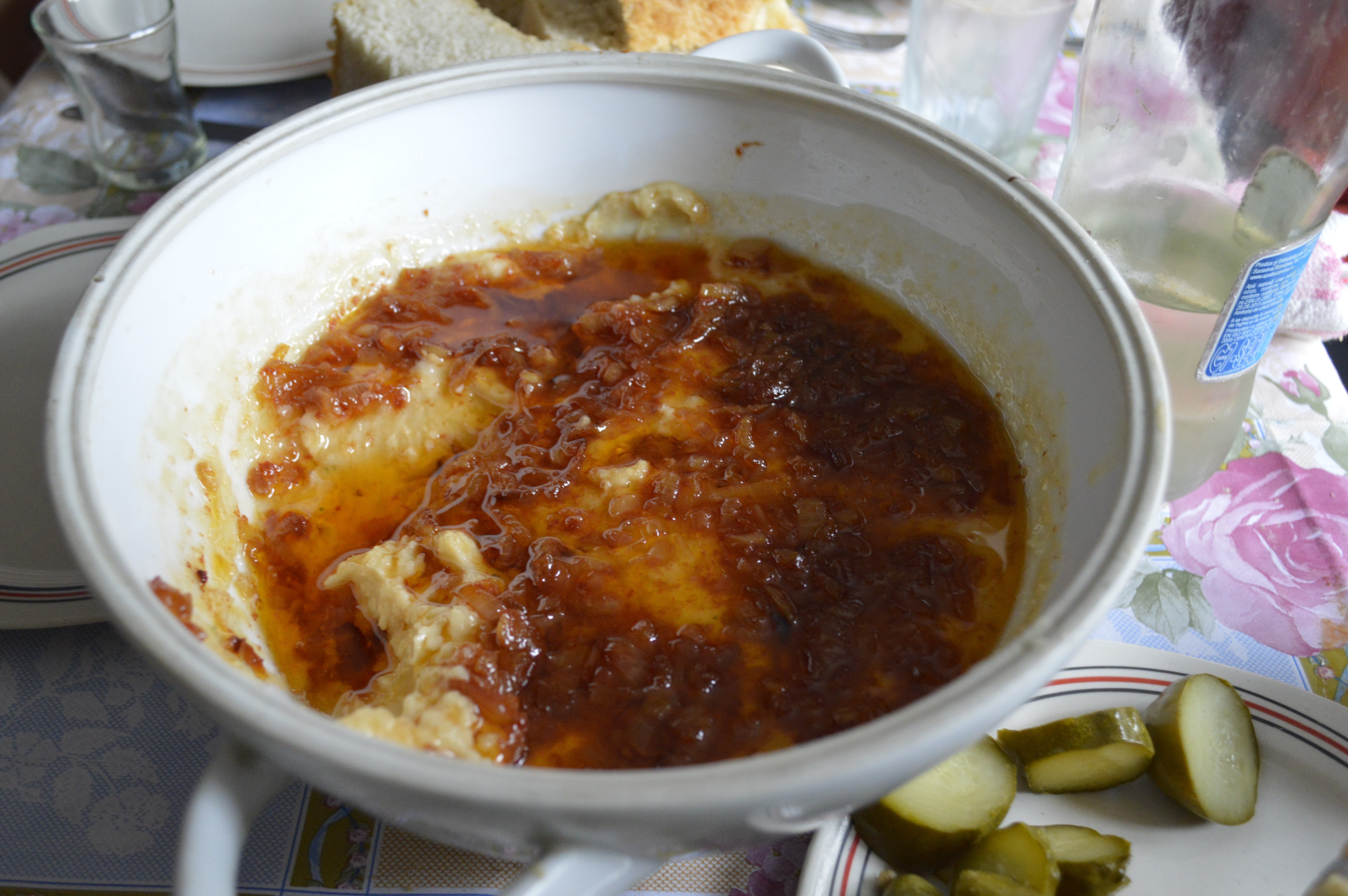
Bowl of fasole bătută

Fasole bătută or fasole făcăluită (literally 'mashed beans') or icre de fasole ('roe of beans') is a bean-based paste prepared in Romania and Moldova. This dip is traditionally made by mashing boiled beans and mixing them with vegetable oil, then adding some chopped onions. Some recipes call for garlic, chili pepper, lime or lemon juice, and additional seasonings.

This dish is traditionally eaten by adherents of the Romanian Orthodox Church during Lent and other fasting periods.

== See also ==
- Salată de icre
