= Bottarga =

Salted, cured fish roe pouch

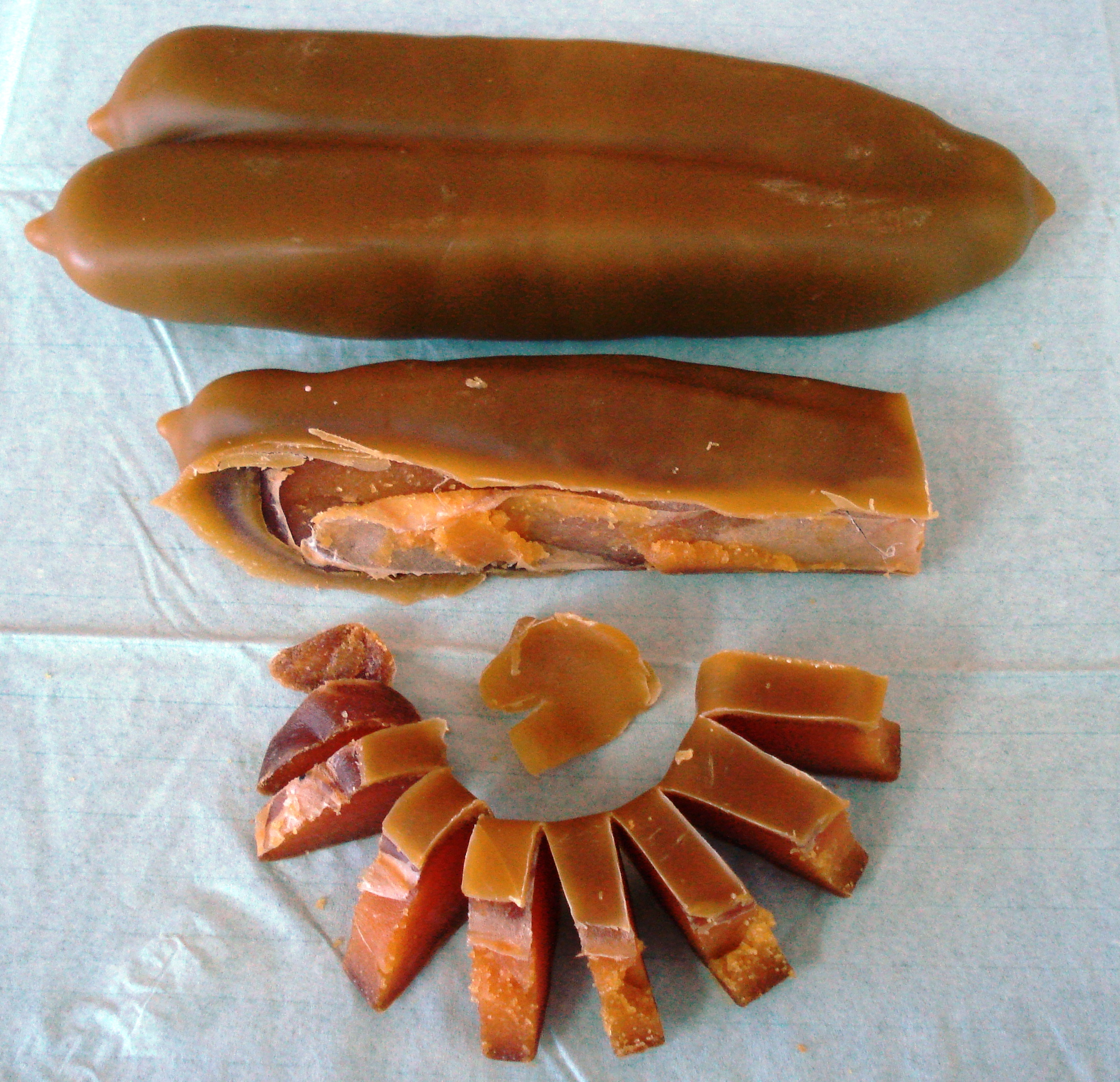
- Whole and sliced bottarga
- Course: Hors d'oeuvre
- Main ingredients: Fish roe

Bottarga is salted, cured fish roe pouch, typically of the grey mullet or the bluefin tuna (Italian: bottarga di tonno). It is a feature of Italian cuisine; forms of the dish from other parts of the world include Taiwanese wūyú zǐ, which is softer, and Korean eoran, from mullet or freshwater drum. It has many names and is prepared in various ways. Due to its scarcity and involved preparation it is expensive and regarded as a delicacy.

== Names and etymology ==
The English name, bottarga, was borrowed from Italian. The Italian form is thought to have been introduced from the Arabic buṭarḫah (بطارخة), plural form buṭariḫ (بطارخ), itself from Byzantine Greek ᾠοτάριχον (oiotárikhon), a combination of the words ᾠόν ('egg') and τάριχον ('pickled').

The Italian form can be dated to c. 1500, as the Greek form of the word, when transliterated into Latin as ova tarycha, occurs in Bartolomeo Platina's De honesta voluptate (c. 1474), the earliest printed cookbook. In an Italian manuscript that "closely parallels" Platina's cookbook and dated to shortly after its publication, botarghe is attested in the corresponding passage.

The first mention of the Greek form (oiotárikhon) occurs in the 11th century, in the writings of Simeon Seth, who denounced the food as something to be "avoided totally", although a similar phrase may have been in use since antiquity in the same connotation.

It has been suggested that the Coptic outarakhon may be an intermediate form between the Greek and Arabic, whereas examination of dialectical variants of the Greek ᾠόν 'egg' includes the Pontic Greek ὠβόν (traditionally where the mullets are caught), and ὀβό or βό in parts of Asia Minor. The modern Greek name comes from the Byzantine Greek, substituting the modern word αυγό for the ancient word ᾠóν.

== History ==
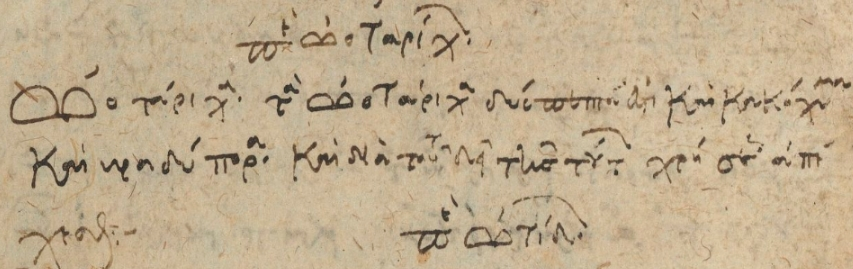
The Byzantine 10th century physician Simeon Seth's instruction on ootaricho (the medieval Greek form of the word): avoid it totally. BNF MS suppl. grec 634, f. 254v detail.

Bottarga production is first documented in the Nile Delta in the 10th century BCE.

In the 15th century, Martino da Como describes the production of bottarga by salting then smoking to dry it.

== Preparation ==
Bottarga is made chiefly from the roe pouch of grey mullet. Sometimes it is prepared from Atlantic bluefin tuna (bottarga di tonno rosso) or yellowfin tuna. It is massaged by hand to eliminate air pockets, then dried and cured in sea salt for a few weeks. The result is a hard, dry slab. Formerly, it was generally coated in beeswax to preserve it, as it still is in Greece and Egypt.

== Regions ==
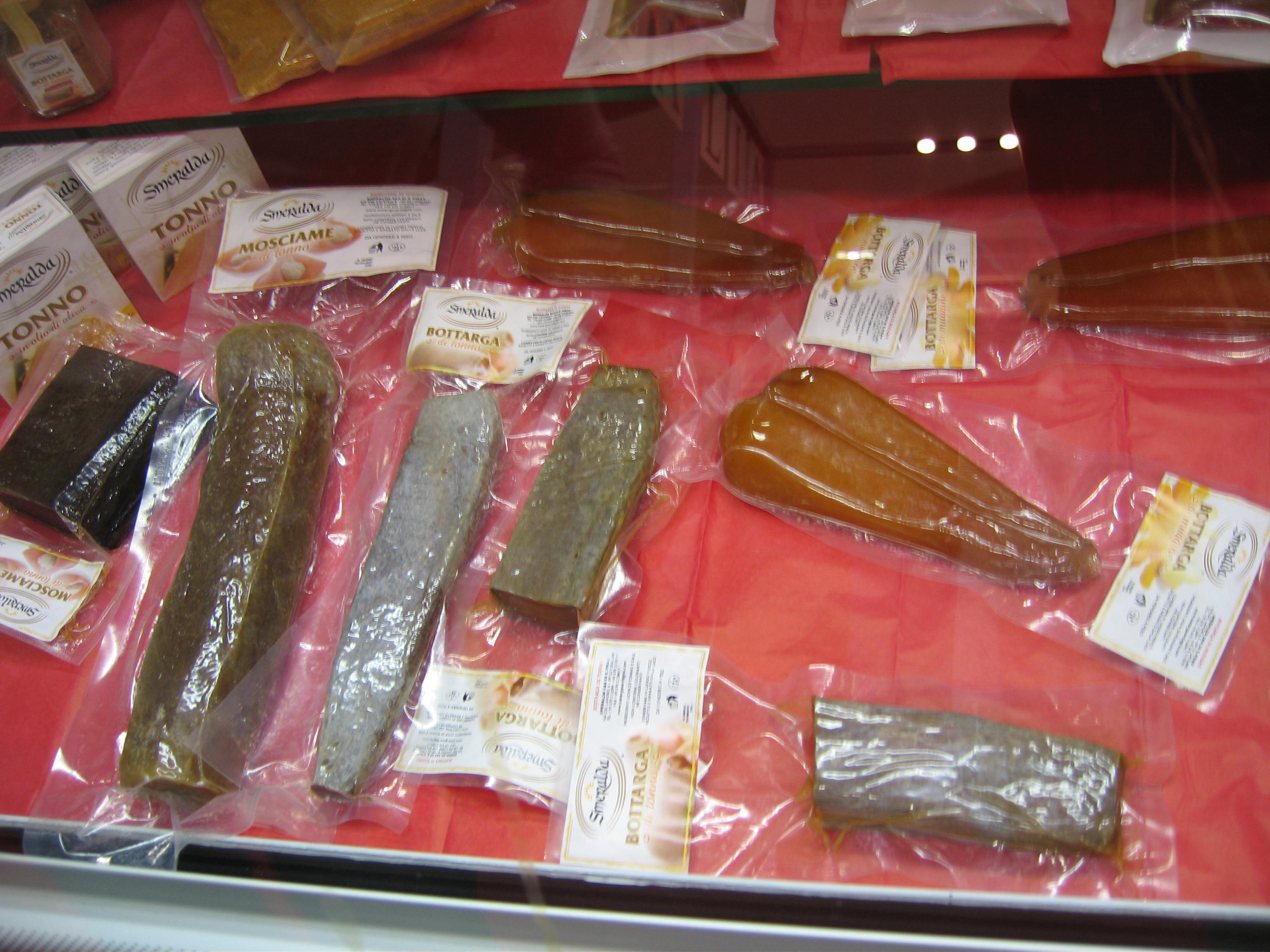
A display of various packaged Italian bottarga in a gourmet counter

=== Tunisia ===
Orange and molded in wax or vacuum sealed, Tunisian bottarga is made from mullet eggs and is known as a sought-after product. Initially a feature of the Judeo-Tunisian cuisine, it was introduced in Tunisia by Jews from Constantinople during Ottoman rule, as early as the 16th century.

=== Egypt ===
Bottarga is produced in the Port Said area.

=== Greece ===
In Greece, it is called avgotaraxo or avgotaracho (Greek: αβγοτάραχο-αυγοτάραχο) and is produced primarily from the flathead mullet caught in Greek lagoons. The whole mature ovaries are removed from the fish, washed with water, salted with natural sea salt, dried under the sun, and sealed in melted beeswax.

Avgotaracho Messolonghiou, made from fish caught in the Messolonghi-Etoliko Lagoons, is a European and Greek protected designation of origin, one of the few seafood products with a PDO.

=== Italy ===
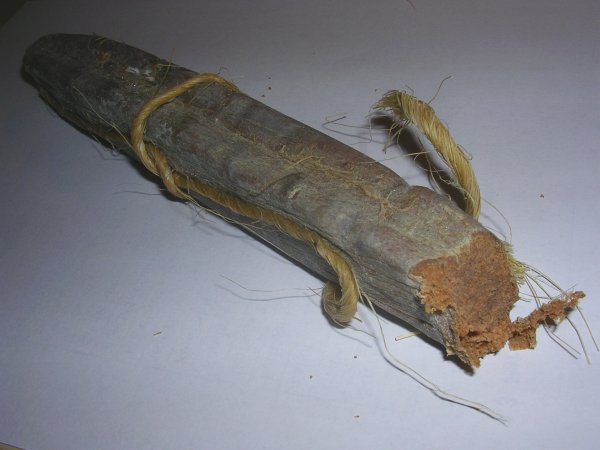
Bottarga of bluefin tuna from Favignana, Sicily

In Italy, it is made from bluefin tuna in Sicily, and from flathead mullet in Sardinia, where it is called Sardinian butàriga.

Its culinary properties may be compared to those of dry anchovies, although it is much more expensive. Often, it is served with olive oil or lemon juice as an appetizer accompanied by bread or crostini. It is also used in pasta dishes.

=== Mauritania ===
Bottarga is produced in Mauritania and Senegal.

=== Turkey ===
In Turkey, bottarga is made from grey mullet roe. It is listed in the Ark of Taste. It is produced in Dalyan, on the southwestern coast of Turkey, from the mature fish migrating from Lake Köyceğiz.

=== United States ===
There are several producers in Florida.

=== Elsewhere ===
There are various small producers elsewhere. For example, bottarga from Atlantic cod (Gadus morhua) is produced in northern Norway, where it is air-dried.
