= Roe =

Egg masses of fish and seafood

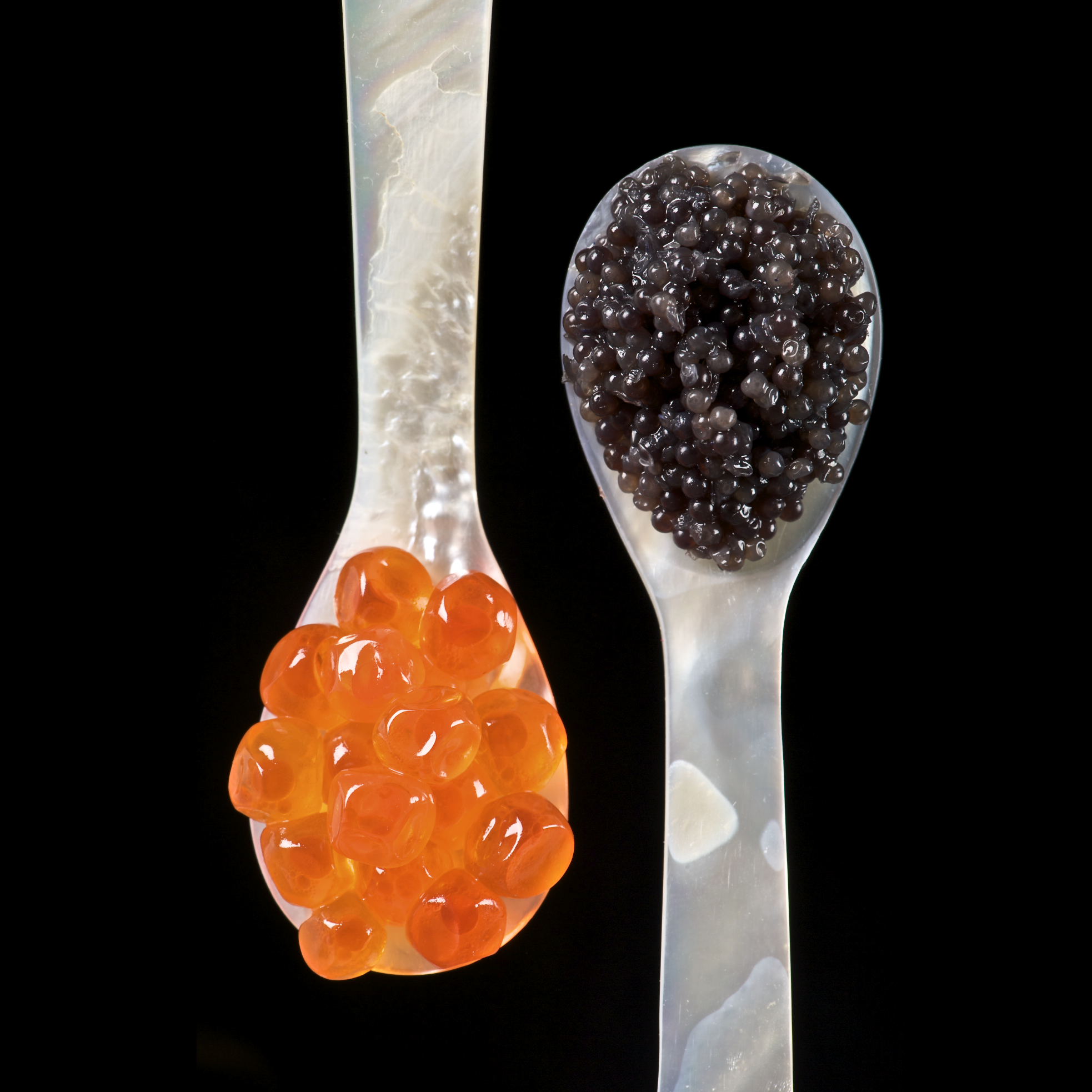
Salmon roe (left) and sturgeon roe (caviar) (right)

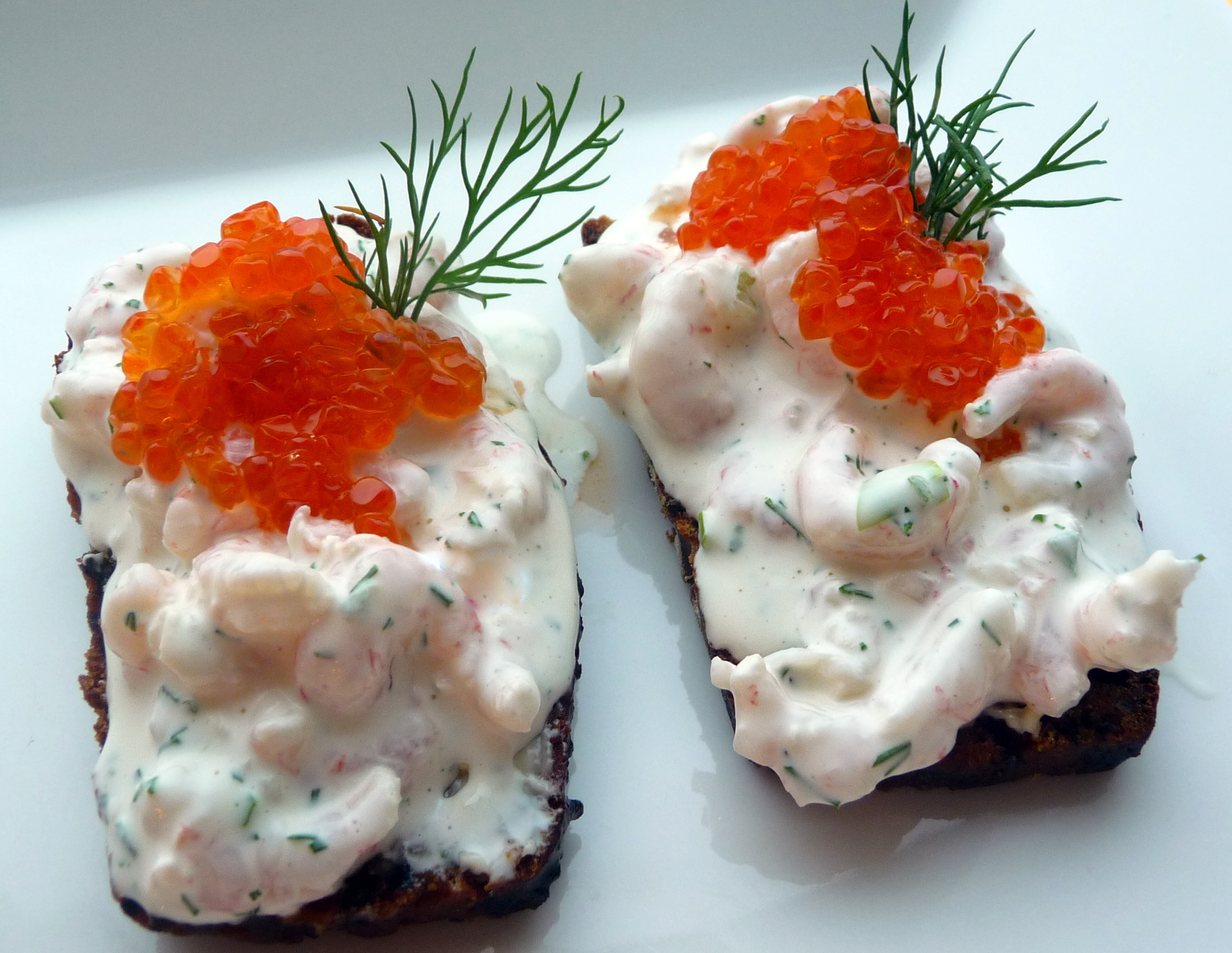
Swedish toast Skagen topped with cold-smoked salmon roe, on bread

Roe, (/roʊ/ ROH) or hard roe, is the fully ripe internal egg masses in the ovaries, or the released external egg masses, of fish and certain marine animals such as shrimp, scallop, sea urchins and squid. As a seafood, roe is used both as a cooked ingredient in many dishes, and as a raw ingredient for delicacies such as caviar.

The roe of marine animals, such as the roe of lumpsucker, hake, mullet, salmon, Atlantic bonito, mackerel, squid, and cuttlefish are especially rich sources of omega-3 fatty acids, but omega-3s are present in all fish roe. Also, a significant amount of vitamin B_{12} is among the nutrients present in fish roes.

Roe from a sturgeon, or sometimes other fish such as flathead grey mullet, is the raw base product from which caviar is made.

The term soft roe or white roe denotes fish milt, not fish eggs.

== By country ==
=== Africa ===
==== South Africa ====
People in KwaZulu-Natal consume fish roe in the form of slightly sour curry or battered and deep fried.

=== Americas ===
==== Brazil ====
In southern Brazil, in particular in the litoral parts of the state of Santa Catarina (from Azorean colonization), mullet roesacks are consumed deep-fried or pan-seared by the locals.

==== Canada ====
Roe is extracted from sturgeon, salmon, sea urchins, etc. (Note: And cisco eggs for export, below.) Herring roe sacs are also extracted mainly for export to Japan (as kazunoko q.v.). But spawned herring roe was also traditional foodstuff for indigenous people of British Columbia.

The collection and consumption of herring roe is actually a long-standing native practice for the Indigenous people of the (Northern and Middle) Pacific coast. Traditional methods involves harvesting the naturally occurring "spawn-on-kelp" (Haida: k'aaw or eggs laid on purposefully submerged hemlock branches. Nowadays "spawn on kelp" is commercially produced, mostly bound for Japan. (Note: Where it is called komochi kombu (子持ち昆布; lit. 'child-holding kelp'))

Roe from the cisco is harvested from the Great Lakes, primarily for overseas markets.

In the province of New Brunswick, roe (caviar) of the Atlantic sturgeon is harvested from the Saint John river. Whereas in coastal British Columbia, Fraser River white sturgeon are sustainably farmed to produce caviar.

==== Chile ====
In Chile, sea urchin roe is a traditional food known as an "erizo de mar". Chile is one of many countries that exports sea urchins to Japan in order to fulfill Japanese demand.

==== Dominican Republic ====
In Dominican Republic, dried and smoked herring roe ("huevas de arenque") is eaten. Unlike in some countries, it's generally cooked before consumption.

==== Peru ====
In Peru, roe is served in many seafood restaurants sauteed, breaded and pan fried, and sometimes accompanied by a side of fresh onion salad. It is called Huevera Frita. Cojinova (Seriolella violacea) yields the best roe for this dish. Despite the fact that many people like it, it is hardly considered a delicacy. Upscale restaurants are not expected to offer it, but street vendors and smaller restaurants will make their first daily sales of it before they run out. Cojinova itself (considered a medium quality fish) is caught for its fish meal, not for its roe, which is considered a chance product. Sea urchin roe is considered a delicacy and it is used (at customer request) to add strength to ceviche.

==== United States ====
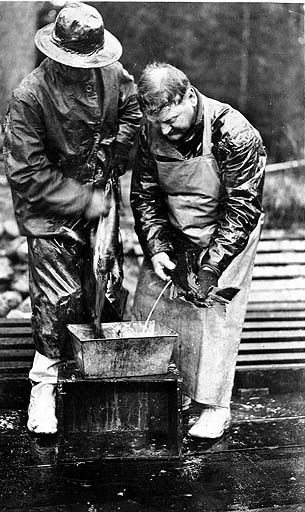
Photograph of men harvesting and fertilizing salmon eggs from a female at a hatchery in Alaska by John Nathan Cobb (early 20th century)

In the United States, several kinds of roe are produced: salmon from the Pacific coast, shad and herring species such as the American shad and alewife, mullet, paddlefish, American bowfin, and some species of sturgeon. Shad, pike, and other roe sometimes are pan-fried with bacon. Spot prawn roe (hard to find) is also a delicacy from the North Pacific. Flounder roe, pan-fried and served with grits is popular on the Southeastern coast.

Herring roe harvested in Alaska are mostly shipped to Japan (cf. kazunoko under § Japan). The indigenous people (Tlingit) of the Sitka Sound had traditionally collected and eaten herring roe. (cf. also § Canada)

=== Asia ===
==== Cambodia ====
In Cambodia roe (Khmer: ពងត្រី, pông trei) are fermented and usually eaten with steamed eggs, omelettes and other hen or duck egg dishes.

==== China ====
In many regions in China, crab and urchin roes are eaten as a delicacy. Crab roe are often used as topping in dishes such as "crab roe tofu" (蟹粉豆腐). Nanxiang Steamed Bun Restaurant serves "crab roe xiaolongbao" as their special. Shrimp roes are also eaten in certain places, especially around the downstream of Yangtze River, such as Wuhu, as toppings for noodle soup.

==== India, Pakistan and Bangladesh ====
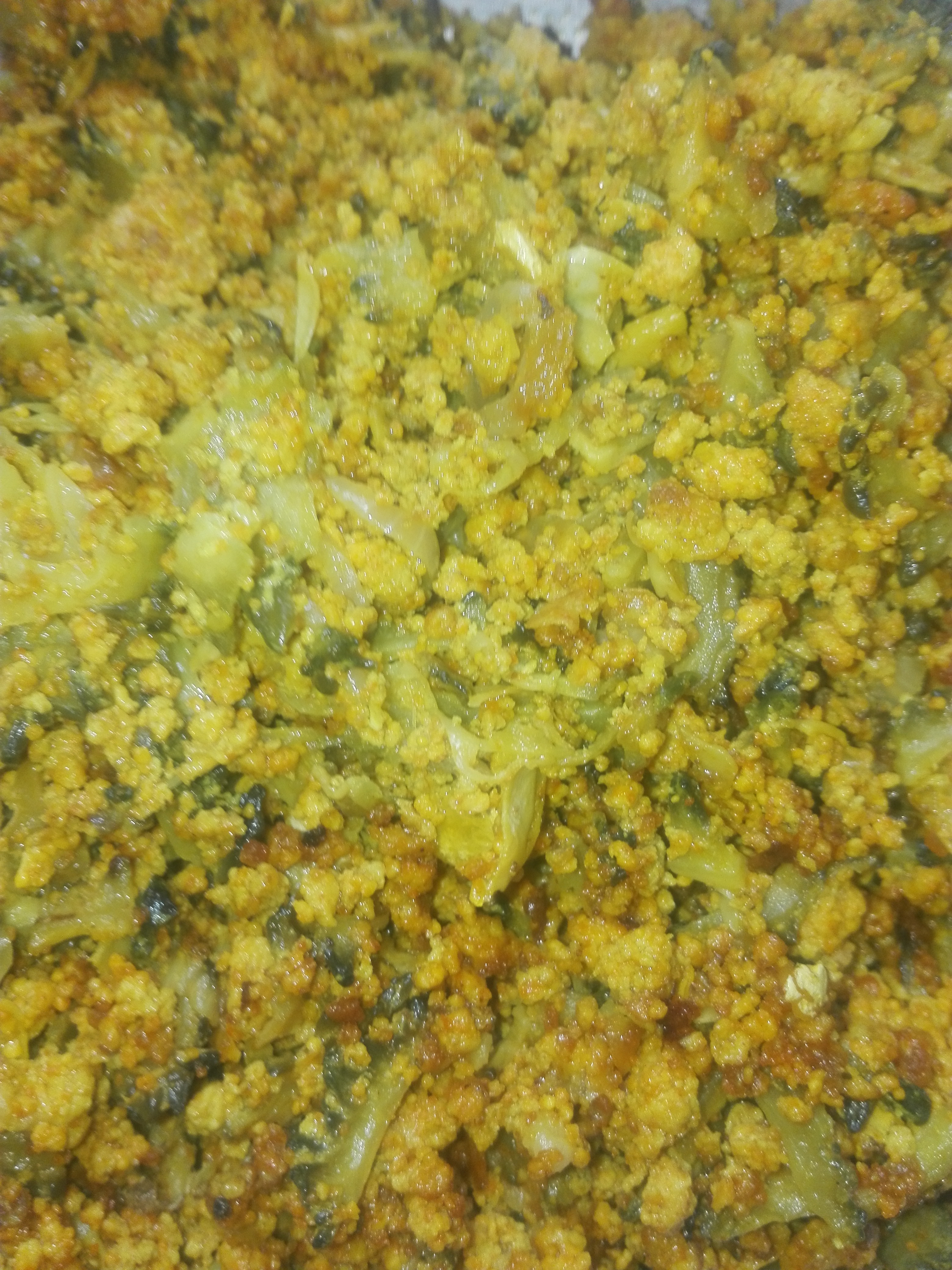
Fried roe dish with vegetables

Among the populace of eastern India, roe that has been deeply roasted over an open fire is a delicacy. In this region, the roe of rohu is also considered a delicacy and is eaten fried or as a stuffing within a fried pointed gourd to make potoler dolma.

Roe from the ilish fish is considered a delicacy in Bangladesh. The roe is usually deep-fried, although other preparations such as mashed roe where the roe crushed along with oil, onion and pepper, or curry of roe can also be found.

All along the Konkan coast and Northern Kerala, the roe of sardines, black mackerel and several other fish is considered a delicacy. The roe can be eaten fried (after being coated with red chilli paste) and also as a thick curry (gashi). In Goa and Malvan, roe is first steamed or poached, then coated with salt and chilli powder and then shallow fried or roasted on a tawa (flat pan). In the state of Kerala, roe is deep fried in coconut oil, and is considered a delicacy. A common method of quick preparation is to wrap the roe in wet banana leaves and cook it over charcoal embers.

In Odisha and West Bengal, roe of several fresh-water fish, including hilsa, are eaten, the roe being cooked separately or along with the fish, the latter method being preferred for all but large fishes. Roe, either light or deep-fried are also eaten as snacks or appetizers before a major meal.

All along the Indus River and Specially South Pakistan Sindh, the roe of Palla (fish), and several other fish is considered a delicacy. The roe can be eaten fried (after being coated with red chilli paste) and also as a thick curry (Salan/Curry). coated with salt and chilli powder and then shallow fried or roasted on a tawa (flat pan).

==== Indonesia ====
Pepes telur ikan is a dish of steamed or fried spiced roe wrapped in banana leaf. In Makassar, It is made from flying fish roe or locals called ikan tuing-tuing. Also in Gresik, the pepes is made from Java barb roe or locals called ikan bader.

In Kendal, telur ikan mimi has become a Ramadan dish. It is made from horseshoe crab roe with grated coconut.

==== Iran ====
In the Caspian provinces of Gilan and Mazandaran, several types of roe are used. Called ashpal or ashbal, roe is consumed grilled, cured, salted, or mixed with other ingredients. If salted or cured, it is consumed as a condiment. If used fresh, it is usually grilled, steamed, or mixed with eggs and fried to form a custard-like dish called "Ashpal Kuku".

Besides the much sought-after caviar, roe from kutum (also known as Caspian white fish or Rutilus frisii kutum), Caspian roach (called "kuli" in Gileki), bream (called "kulmeh" in Gileki), and Caspian salmon are highly prized. Roe from carp is less common and barbel roe is also occasionally used.

==== Israel ====
Several sections of the Israeli cuisine include roe. In Modern Hebrew, roe is commonly referred to by its Russian name "ikra" (איקרה). When necessary, the color is also mentioned: white or pink, as appropriate. Israeli "white ikra" is commonly made of carp or herring eggs, while "red ikra" is made of flathead mullet eggs or, in rarer cases, salmon eggs. The term "caviar" is separate, and denotes only sturgeon eggs.

Ikra is served as a starter dish, to be eaten with pita or similar breads, particularly in Arab restaurants. It can also be purchased in stores, in standard-sized plastic packages. In home cooking it is similarly served as a starter dish.

In Judaism, roe from kosher fish—fish with fins and scales—is considered kosher. Like fish in general, it is considered pareve. However, roe is considered kosher only if the fish from which it is harvested is kosher as well. Caviar from sturgeon is therefore not considered kosher from an Orthodox Jewish perspective, as that fish is not understood to have scales under Orthodox interpretations of Jewish law.

For most observant Orthodox Jewish consumers who keep kosher, roe or caviar must be processed under kosher supervision as well. The only exception to this rule is red roe, thanks to a widely accepted responsa by the Bais Yosef.

==== Japan ====
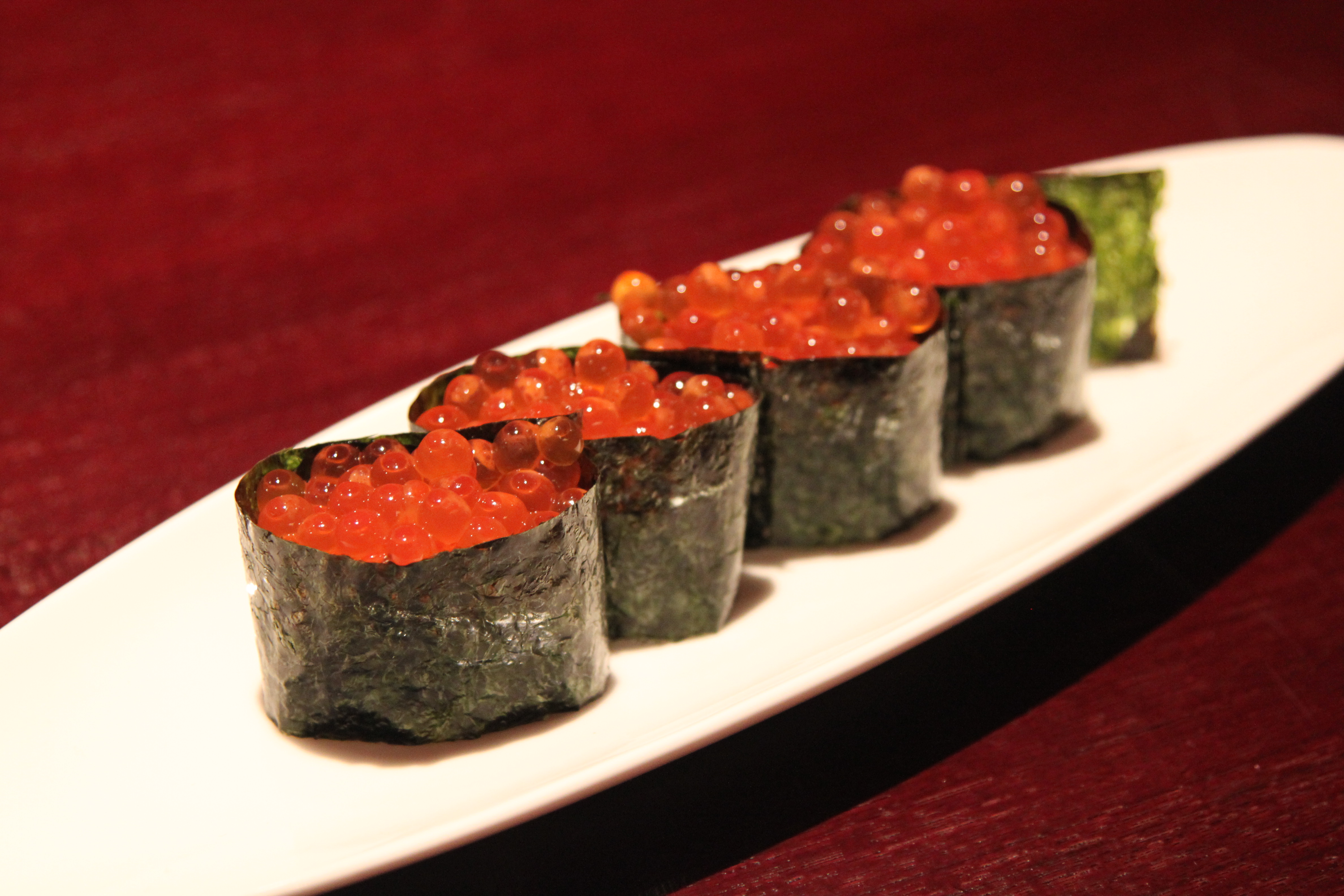
Sushi topped with salmon roe

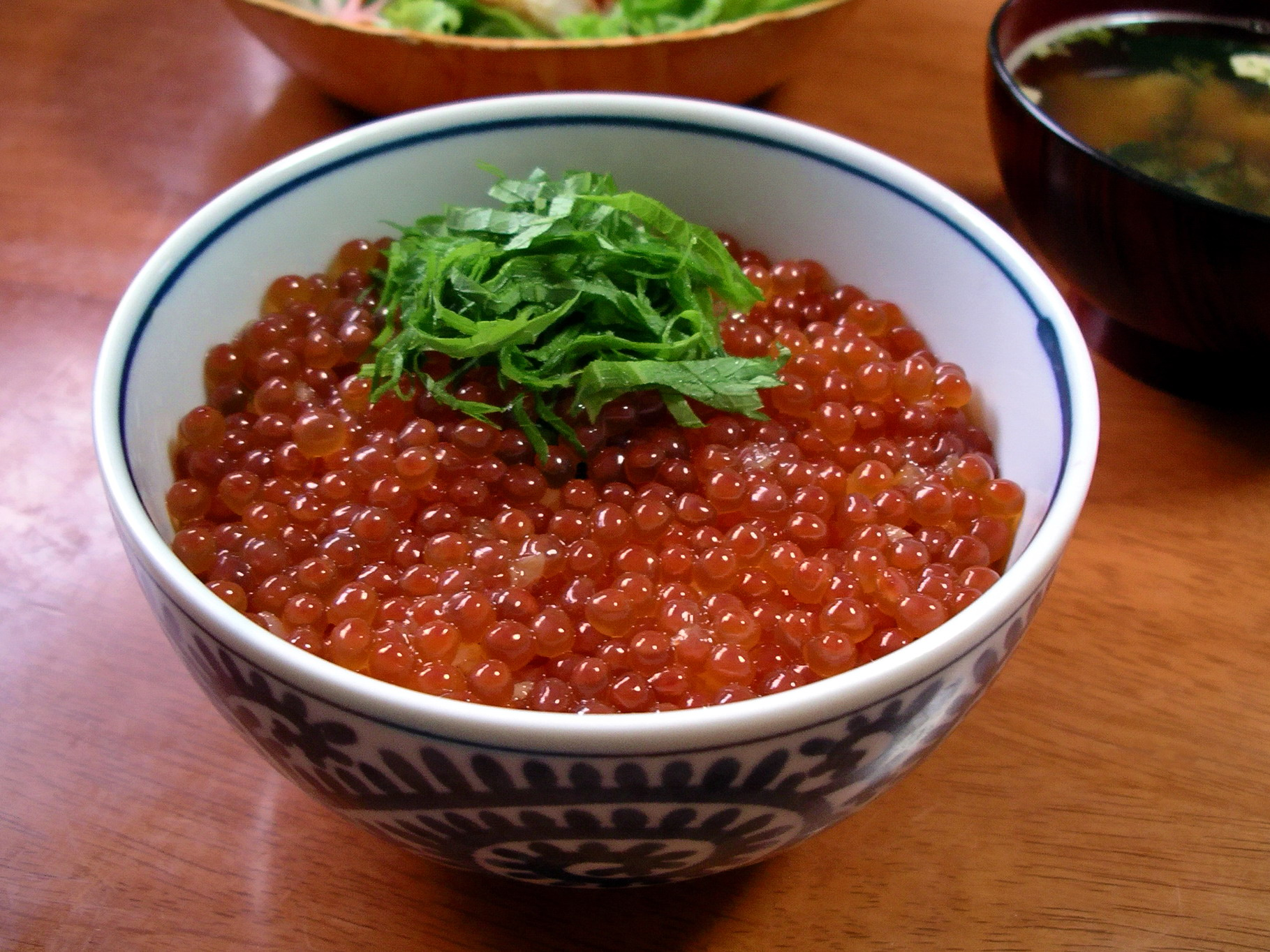
Ikuradon, a bowl of rice topped with salmon roe

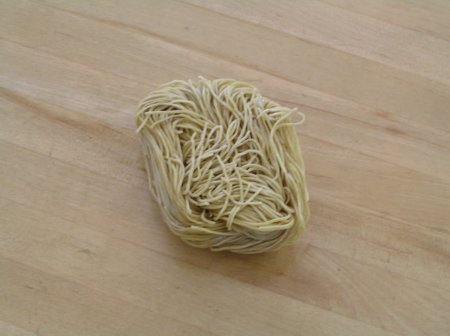
Uncooked noodle made from shrimp roe

Various roe types are used in Japanese cuisine, including the following which are used raw in sushi:

- Ebiko - Shrimp roe.
- Ikura (イクラ) - Salmon roe. Large reddish-orange individual spheres. It is a loan word from the Russian, "икра" (roe, in this context caviar).
  - Sujiko (すじこ/筋子) - Salmon roe sac whole pieces. Sujiko is darker (red to dark-red), also sweeter in taste.
- Kazunoko (数の子/鯑) - herring roe sac, yellow or pinkish, having a firm, rubbery texture and appearance, now usually brined..
  - 子持ち昆布 (komochi kombu; "spawn on kelp") - herring eggs heavily laid on seaweed, mostly imported from Canada. (Note: Some produced in Alaska) (cf. k'aaw above)
- Karasumi (カラスミ/鱲子) - dried mullet roe, a specialty of Nagasaki. Along with sea urchin and konowata (cf. kuchiko below) it is considered one of the big three chinmi of Japan.
- Kuchiko or konoko - sea cucumber roe. Often dried.
- Masago (真砂子)- Capelin roe, similar to Tobiko, but smaller.
- Tarako (たらこ/鱈子) - Salted Alaska pollock roe, sometimes grilled.
  - Mentaiko (明太子) - Alaska pollock roe sac, cured and spiced with red pepper. Mentaiko is usually pink to dark red.
- Tobiko (飛び子) - Flying fish roe, very crunchy, reddish orange in color.

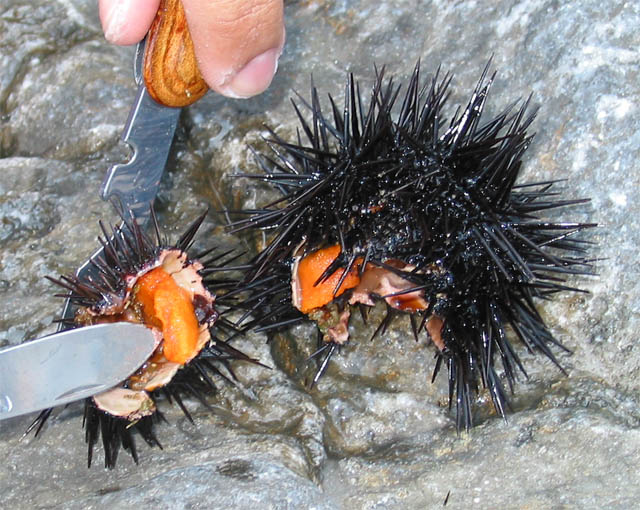
Sea urchin roe

- Uni (うに/雲丹) - Sea urchin roe, used in sushi, also preserved uni (packed in jars). Orange to pale yellow. The ichigoni soup is a northern specialty (also available canned).

In addition, the shishamo fish is grilled or fried whole and served with its roe intact. The roe takes up most of the fish's body.

==== Korea ====
In Korean, the roe found inside the belly of a fish is called "goni" (鯤鮞).

All kinds of fish roe are widely eaten in Korean cuisine, including the popular sea urchin, salmon, herring, flying fish, cod, among others. Myeongran jeot (명란젓) refers to the jeotgal (salted fermented seafood) made with pollock roe seasoned with chili pepper powders. It is commonly consumed as banchan, small dish accompanied with cooked rice or ingredient for altang (알탕), a kind of jjigae (Korean stew).

Albap is a bibimbap made with roe.

==== Lebanon ====
Sea urchin roe, or toutia توتية as it is known locally, is eaten directly from the sea urchin shell fresh using a small spoon. Some people add a twist of lemon juice to the roe and eat it in Lebanese flat bread.

==== Malaysia ====
Particularly in Sarawak, Malaysia, Toli Shad fish roe is a popular delicacy among locals and tourists. The roe is usually found in the street market in Sarawak's capital city of Kuching. The roe can be sold for up to US$19 per 100 grams and is considered expensive among locals, but the price can reach up to US$30 in other states of Malaysia.

The roe is usually salted before sale but fresh roe is also available. The salted roe is usually pan fried or steamed and eaten with steamed rice. The fish itself is also usually salted and served along with the roe.

=== Oceania ===
==== Australia ====
Roe is commonly served at Japanese restaurants in Australia and New Zealand.

==== New Zealand ====
The Māori people and other New Zealanders eat sea urchin roe, called "kina". Kina is sold in fish shops, supermarkets, and alongside the road. Most commercial kina is imported from the Chatham Islands.

=== Europe ===
All around the Mediterranean, bottarga is an esteemed specialty made of the cured roe pouch of flathead mullet, tuna, or swordfish; it is called bottarga (Italian), poutargue or boutargue (French), botarga (Spanish), batarekh (Arabic) or avgotaraho (Greek αυγοτάραχο).

==== Denmark ====
The most commonly eaten roe in Denmark is cod roe, usually sold canned with added water, starch, oil, salt, and tomato puree and then boiled and preserved. It is served sliced, either as is or slightly roasted in a pan, on top of rye bread, sometimes topped with remoulade and/or lemon. An everyday food item on many Danish lunch tables. Lumpfish (stenbider) roe is another roe used in Danish cuisine. It is considered somewhat of a luxury item and is primarily used as a condiment on top of halved or sliced hard-boiled eggs, on top of mounds of shrimp, or in combination with other fish or seafood.

==== France ====
Sea urchin roe (oursin in French) is eaten directly from the sea and in restaurants, where it is served both by itself and in seafood platters, usually spooned from the shell of the animal. Crab, shrimp and prawn roe still attached to those animals is also considered a delicacy.

==== Finland ====
Common whitefish and especially vendace from the fresh water lakes in Finland are renowned for the excellent delicate taste of the roe. Roe is served as topping of toast or on blini with onion and smetana.

==== Greece ====
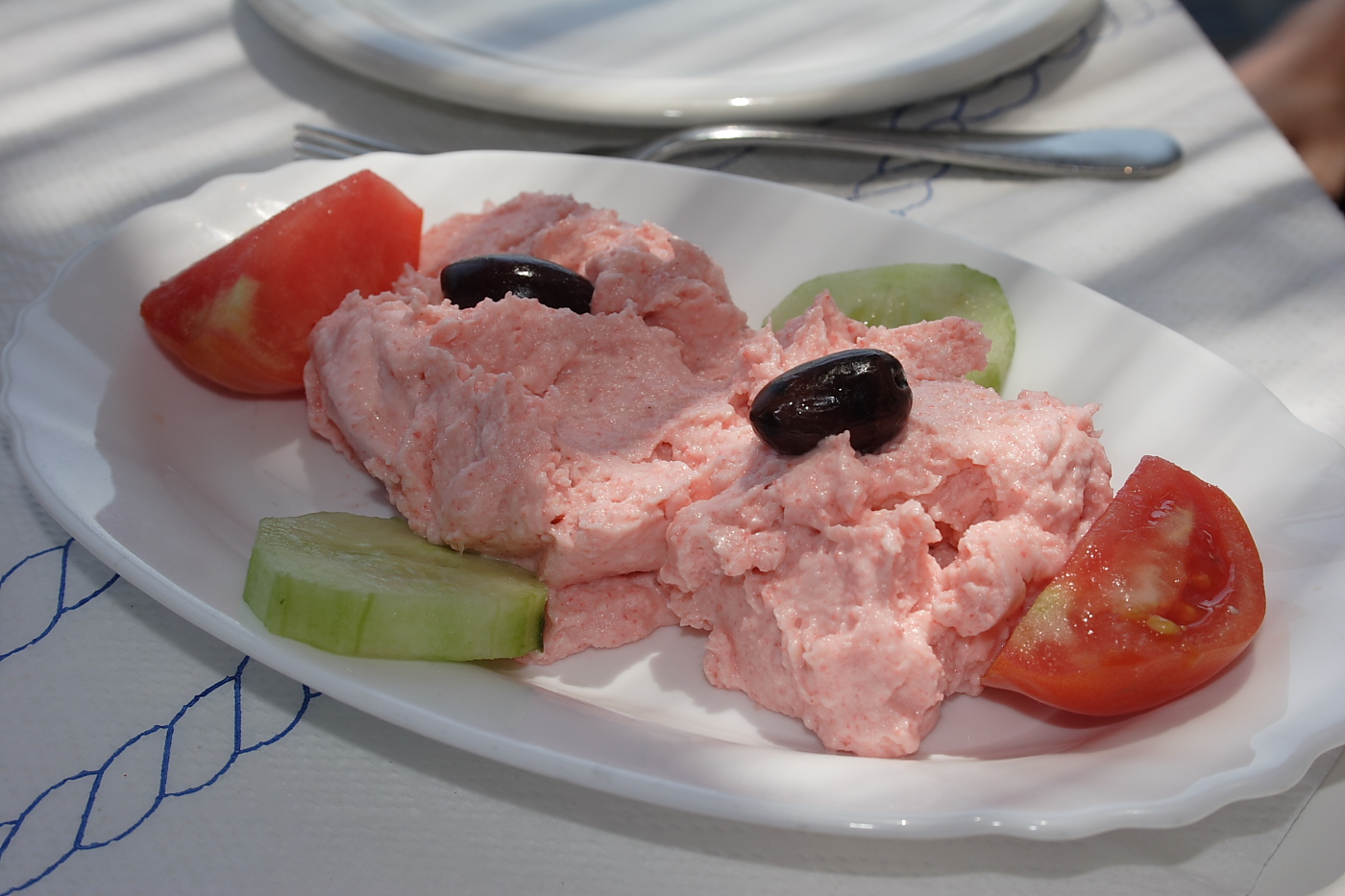
Taramasalata, salad made with taramá

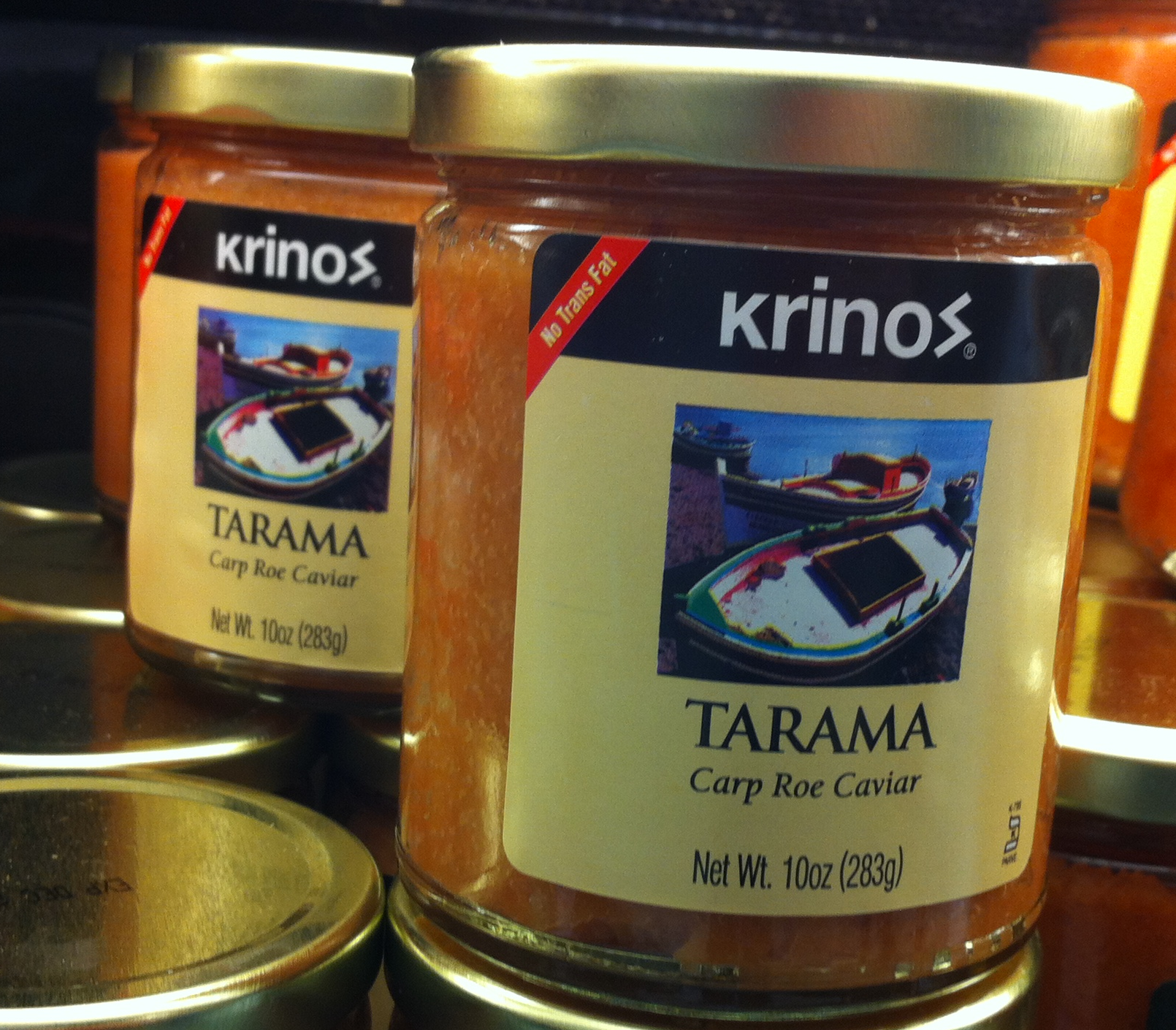
Carp roe sold in jars

Taramá is salted and cured carp or cod roe used to make taramosaláta, a Greek meze consisting of taramá mixed with lemon juice, bread crumbs, onions, and olive oil; it is eaten as a dip.

Avgotaraho (αυγοτάραχο) or botargo is the prepared roe of the flathead mullet.

==== Italy ====
Bottarga is a popular ingredient in the south of Italy. It consists of the salted and dried roe pouch of the Atlantic bluefin tuna; it can also be prepared with the dried roe pouch of the flathead mullet. It is used minced for dressing pasta or sliced with olive oil and lemon on bread. On the islands of Sardinia and Sicily, fresh sea urchin roe is widely consumed, both as is and as a pasta sauce. Its consumption is limited to certain months of the year to preserve the sea urchin.

==== Norway ====
Norwegian caviar is most commonly made from cod, but caviar made from lumpsucker or capelin roe is also available. During winter season, when skrei, winter cod is available, roe is cooked in its sack and served with cod liver and poached cod. This traditional dish is particularly popular in coastal Norway and is called mølje. In some areas it is also common to fry the roe from freshly caught fish, to be eaten on bread or with potatoes and flatbread.

==== Portugal ====
Codfish roe and sardine roe are sold in olive oil. The fresh roe of hake (pescada) is also consumed (a popular way of eating it is boiled with vegetables, and simply seasoned with olive oil and a dash of vinegar). In the South of Portugal, the "ouriço do mar" (sea urchin) is highly appreciated. In the Sines area (Alentejo), a layer of dried pine needles is placed on the ground and, on top of it, a layer of sea urchins. This layer is topped with a second layer of dried pine needles. The pile is set on fire. The roe is removed from the cooked sea urchins and eaten. Sea urchin is not consumed in May, June, July, and August.

==== Romania ====
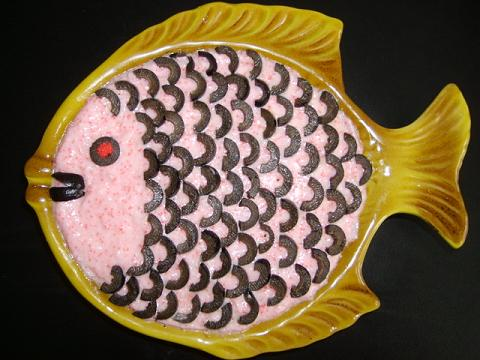
Romanian roe salad decorated with black olives

Fish roe is very popular in Romania as a starter (like salată de icre) or sometimes served for breakfast on toasted bread. The most common roe is that of the European carp; pike, herring, cod are also popular. Fried soft roe is also a popular dish. Sturgeon roe is a delicacy normally served at functions.

==== Russia and ex-USSR countries ====
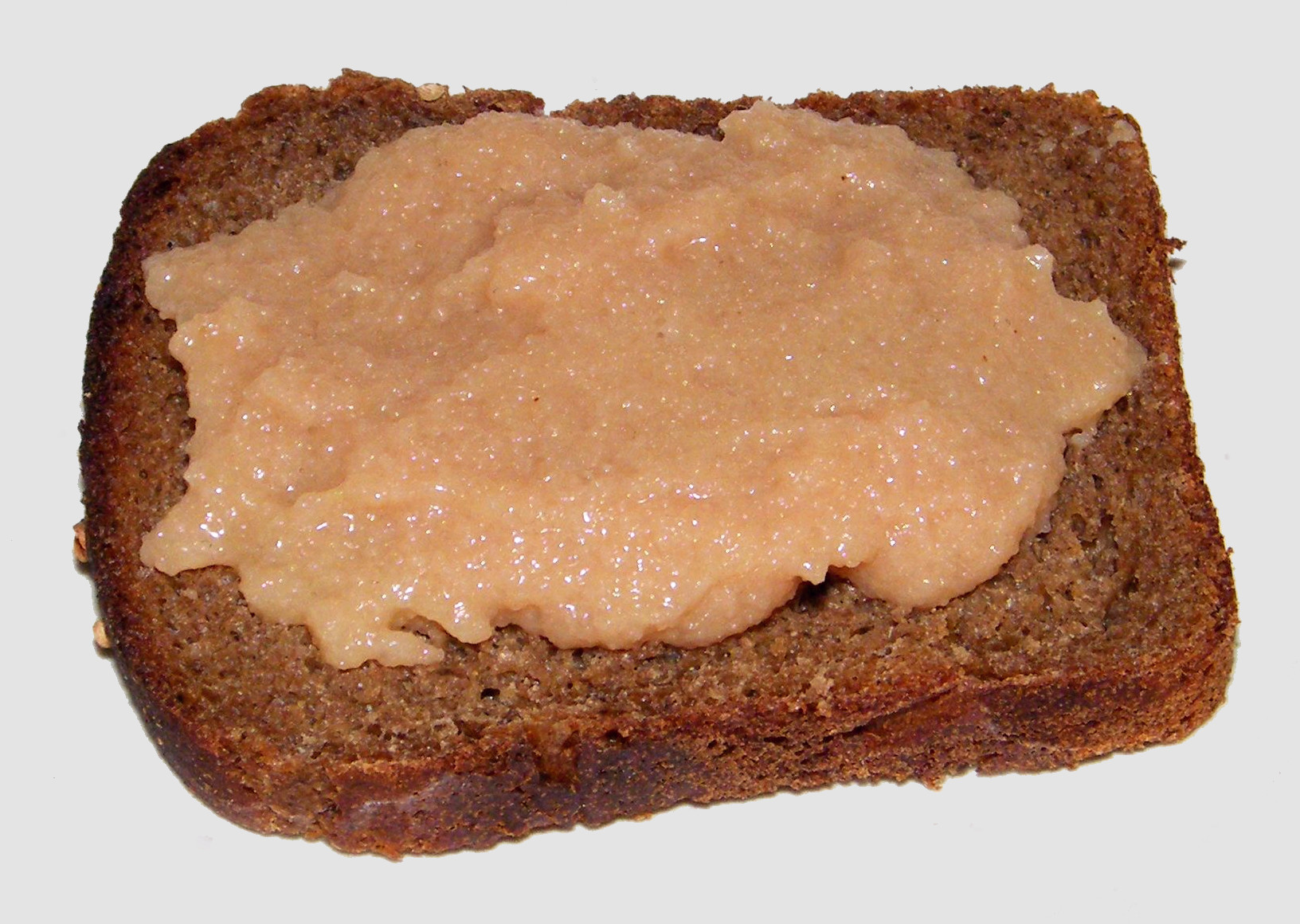
Open sandwich (butterbrot) with pollock roe

In Russian, all types of fish roe are called ikra (икра), and there is no linguistic distinction between the English words "roe" and "caviar". Also, Russians tend to translate any "ikra" as "caviar", thus creating the impression of availability of sturgeon roe.

Sturgeon roe, called chyornaya ikra (чёрная икра, "black caviar") is most prized. It is followed in prestige by salmon roe called krasnaya ikra (красная икра, "red caviar"), which is less expensive, but still considered a delicacy. Both types of roe are usually served lightly salted on buttered wheat bread, or as an accompaniment for blini, or used as an ingredient in various haute cuisine and festive dishes. The butter on bread may soften the taste of large pellets of black or red roe this way, by making it more dull, and the bread should be soft and fresh rather than soggy, crisp or bun-like dense.

More common roes, such as cod, Alaska pollock, and herring ones are everyday dishes, combining richness in protein with low price. Salted cod or pollock roe on buttered bread is common breakfast fare and herring roe is often eaten smoked or fried. The roe of freshwater fish is also popular but the commercial availability is lower. Soft roe of various fishes is also widely consumed, mostly fried, and is a popular cantina-style dish.

- For those "everyday" roes, the buttered bread makes sense, since the canned roe is more salty than caviar sturgeon roe.
- Capelin roe mixed with cream is sold in convenience stores of Russia as a more gentle-tasting variant of aforementioned canned roe spreads.

Roe found in dried vobla fish is considered delicious by some; though dried vobla roe is not produced separately as a stand-alone dish, roe-carrying vobla is prized.

==== Spain ====
Cod and hake roe is commonly consumed throughout Spain in many different forms: sautéed, grilled, fried, marinated, pickled, boiled, with mayonnaise, or in salad. Tuna and ling dry brined roe is traditional in Andalusia and the Mediterranean coasts since antiquity. In all of the Spanish coastal regions, sea urchin roe is considered a delicacy and consumed raw. Roe from the Mediterranean grey mullet, Mugil cephalus, is a sustainable roe resembling sturgeon roe that is marketed from Spain to countries around the world.

==== Sweden ====
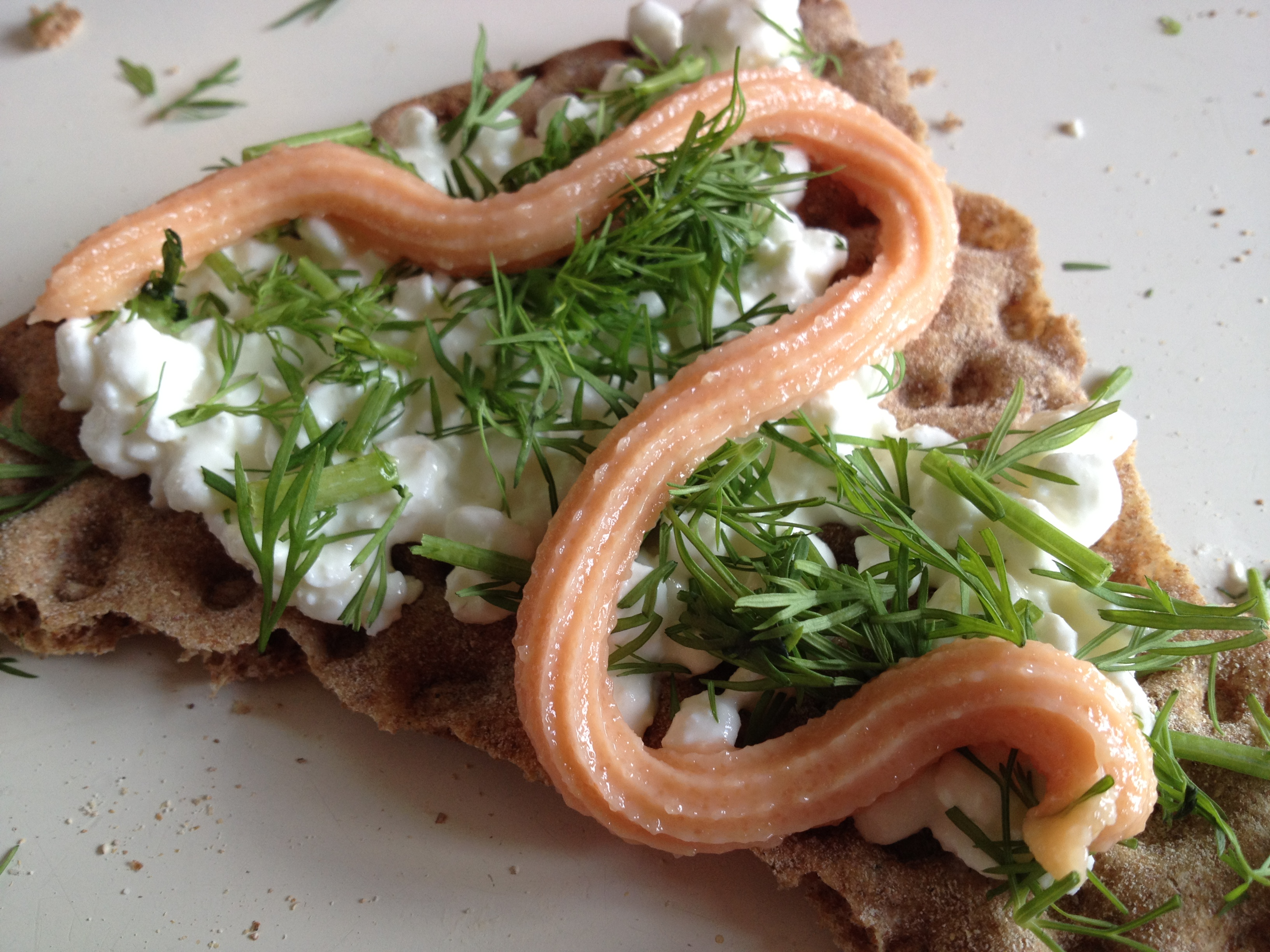
Smörgåskaviar as a condiment on a cottage cheese sandwich

Smoked and salted cod roe paste known as smörgåskaviar, typically sold in tubes, is commonly served as a sandwich topping in Sweden.

Lightly salted roe of the vendace is called löjrom in Swedish. It is naturally orange in colour. The most sought-after type is Kalix löjrom from Kalix in the northern Baltic sea. Most löjrom consumed in Sweden is, however, imported frozen from North America.

Stenbitsrom, the roe of lumpfish, is naturally gray, but is coloured black (to emulate black caviar) or reddish orange (to emulate löjrom). The azo dyes used may have negative health impacts, especially for children, and the colour additives also tend to bleed into other foods served with it. Azo dyes were typically not legal in Sweden, but were allowed in stenbitsrom as children were considered unlikely to consume significant amounts of it.

There is also a trend to use more laxrom (salmon roe), which is a natural orange colour, with a large diameter.

==== United Kingdom ====
Though not popular, herring roe is sold within many British supermarkets. Battered cod roe can also be bought from many fish and chip shops. Various tinned roes are on sale in supermarkets e.g. soft cod roes, pressed cod roes and herring roes.

== See also ==
- Egg as food
- Fish reproduction
- Smoked egg
