= Spiral shell =

Spiral shell may refer to:

- Mollusc shells, of which some are spiral-shaped
- Gastropod shells, of which most are spiral-shaped
- Whorl (mollusc), a 360º turn in spiral-shaped shells
- Spire (mollusc), the collection of whorls in a mollusc's shell
