= Pollicina =

Pollicina Temporal range: Ordovician

Scientific classification
- Domain: Eukaryota
- Kingdom: Animalia
- Phylum: Mollusca (?)
- Genus: †Pollicina

Extinct genus of molluscs

Pollicina is a genus of problematic conical, septate, gently spiralling shell assigned to the Mollusca. Classification to a smaller rank is not possible based on the limited characters displayed.
