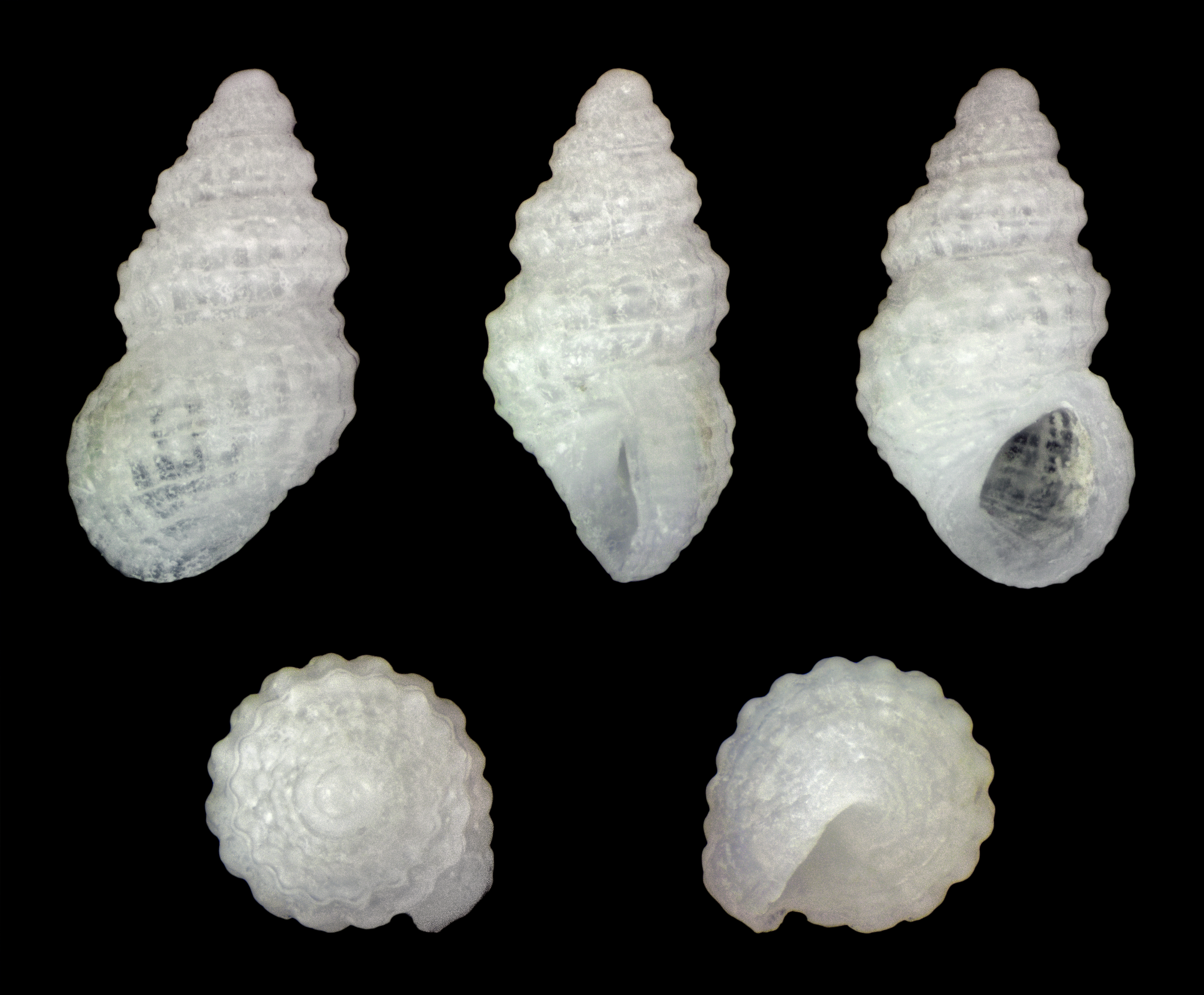

Scientific classification
- Kingdom: Animalia
- Phylum: Mollusca
- Class: Gastropoda
- Subclass: Caenogastropoda
- Order: Littorinimorpha
- Family: Rissoidae
- Genus: Alvania
- Species: A. ignota

Binomial name
- Alvania ignota Cecalupo & Perugia, 2009

= Alvania ignota =

Species of gastropod

Alvania ignota is a species of minute sea snail, a marine gastropod mollusk or micromollusk in the family Rissoidae.

== Description ==
The length of the shell is of small size (holotype 2,2 x 1,2 mm), the shell is conic-ovate, thick, has beaded spiral cords and convex whorls. It is imperforate, vitreous, and colourless.

Protoconch: 1,5 whorls (at 40X smooth).

Teleoconch: three convex whorls, suture impressed and wide. In the last whorl there are 7 spiral cords (3 of which are in the second whorl) with strongly circular beads when they are crossed by about 20 weaker axial ribs. The distance between 2° and 3° cord is larger. The mouth of the snail is oval in shape, with the outer lips having a strong varix. The snail has no umbilicus, while the Operculum and soft parts are unknown.

== Distribution ==
This species occurs in the Indian Ocean off Southern Madagascar; Réunion; Mauritius.
