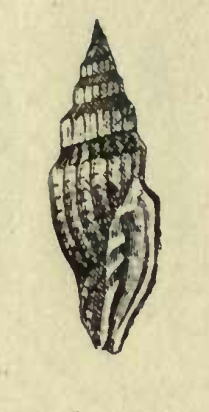
- Drawing of a shell

Scientific classification
- Kingdom: Animalia
- Phylum: Mollusca
- Class: Gastropoda
- Subclass: Caenogastropoda
- Order: Neogastropoda
- Family: Costellariidae
- Genus: Vexillum
- Species: V. antonellii

Binomial name
- Vexillum antonellii (Dhorn, 1860)

Synonyms
- Mitra antonellii Dohrn, 1860; Vexillum (Costellaria) antonellii (Dohrn, 1860)

= Vexillum antonellii =

Species of gastropod

Vexillum antonellii is a species of small sea snail, marine gastropod mollusk in the family Costellariidae, the ribbed miters. which is a group of snails that are commonly known as "tulip snails". Vexillum antonellii is found in the Indo-Pacific region, from the Red Sea to the Solomon Islands. It typically inhabits coral reefs and other hard-bottom substrates at depths of 10-60 meters.

Vexillum antonellii is a medium-sized snail, with shells that can reach up to 50 millimeters in length. The shell is slender and fusiform, with a long, narrow neck and a flared aperture. The shell is typically white or cream in color, with brown or reddish-brown markings. The markings can be in the form of spots, stripes, or zigzags.

Vexillum antonellii is a carnivorous snail. It preys on a variety of small organisms, including worms, crustaceans, and other mollusks. It uses its proboscis, which is a long, muscular tube, to capture and inject venom into its prey. Once the prey is paralyzed, Vexillum antonellii uses its radula, which is a tongue-like organ covered in sharp teeth, to scrape the prey's flesh off of its shell.

Vexillum antonellii is not a commercially important species. However, it is a popular shell among collectors. It is also sometimes used in traditional medicine.

== Description ==
- Shell: The shell of Vexillum antonellii is slender and fusiform, with a long, narrow neck and a flared aperture. The shell can be white or cream in color, with brown or reddish-brown markings. The markings can be in the form of spots, stripes, or zigzags. The shell surface is often covered in fine spiral ridges.
- Aperture: The aperture of Vexillum antonellii is large and flared. The outer lip of the aperture is thickened and crenulated. The inner lip of the aperture is smooth and white.
- Foot: The foot of Vexillum antonellii is large and muscular. It is used for locomotion and for burrowing into the substrate.
- Proboscis: The proboscis of Vexillum antonellii is long and muscular. It is used for capturing prey and injecting venom.
- Radula: The radula of Vexillum antonellii is a tongue-like organ covered in sharp teeth. It is used for scraping flesh from prey.

== Distribution ==
Here are some specific countries where Vexillum antonellii has been found:

- Indonesia
- Malaysia
- Philippines
- Thailand
- Vietnam
- India
- Sri Lanka
- Maldives
- Seychelles
- Tanzania
- Madagascar
- Mauritius
- Solomon Islands

It is possible that Vexillum antonellii is also found in other countries in the Indo-Pacific region, but more research is needed to confirm this.
