= Nacre =

Organic-inorganic composite material produced by some molluscs

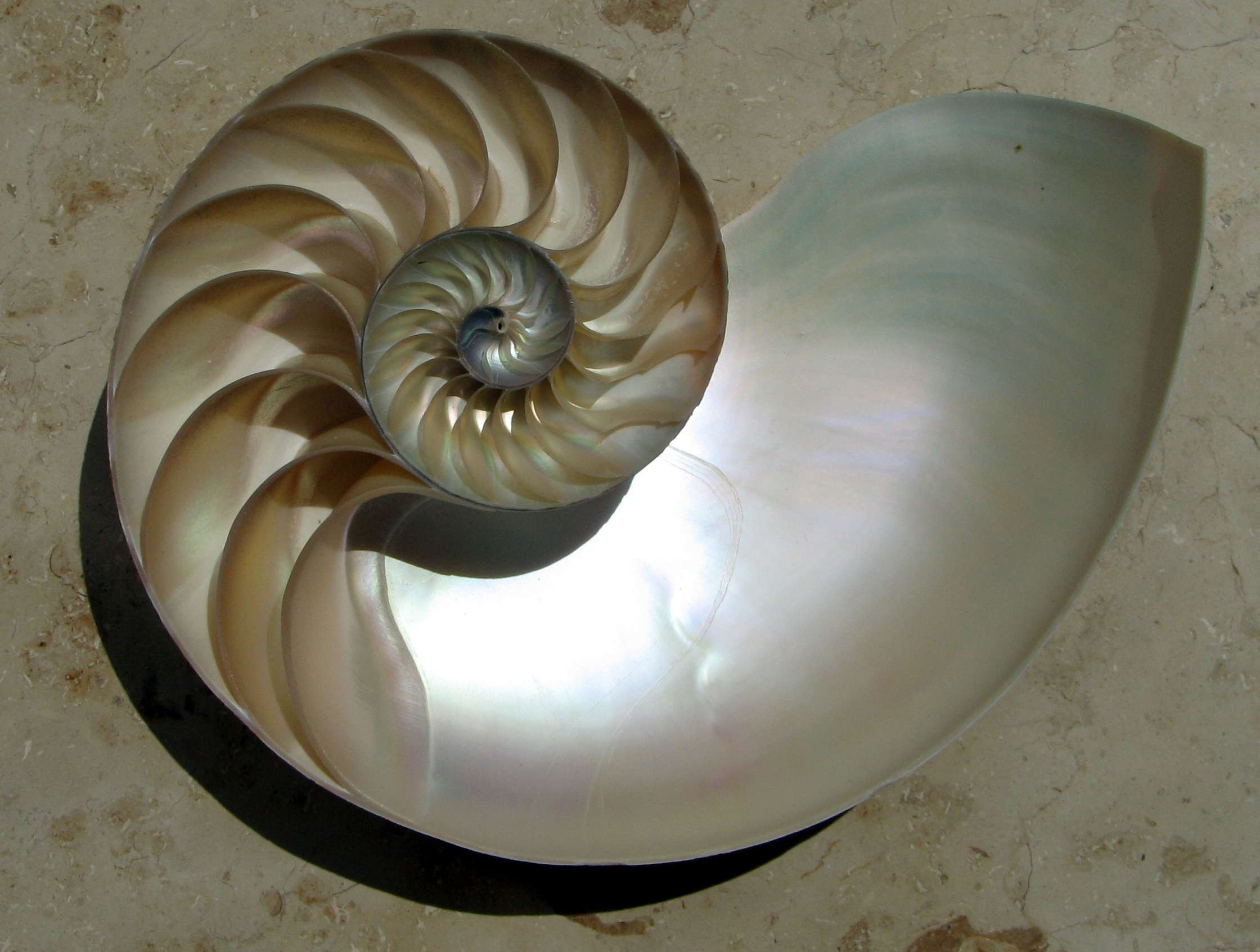
The iridescent nacre inside a nautilus shell

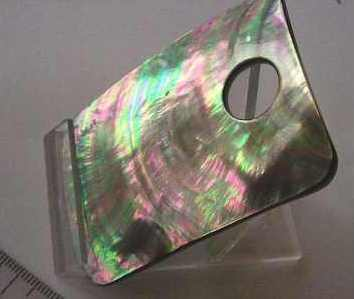
Nacreous shell worked into a decorative object

Nacre (/ˈneɪkər/ NAY-kər, also /ˈnækrə/ NAK-rə), also known as mother-of-pearl, is an organic–inorganic composite material produced by some molluscs as an inner shell layer. It is also the material of which pearls are composed. It is strong, resilient, and iridescent.

Nacre is found in some of the most ancient lineages of bivalves, gastropods, and cephalopods. However, the inner layer in the great majority of mollusc shells is porcellaneous, not nacreous, and this usually results in a non-iridescent shine, or more rarely in non-nacreous iridescence such as flame structure as is found in conch pearls.

The outer layer of cultured pearls and the inside layer of pearl oyster and freshwater pearl mussel shells are made of nacre. Other mollusc families that have a nacreous inner shell layer include marine gastropods such as the Haliotidae, the Trochidae and the Turbinidae.

== Physical characteristics ==
=== Structure and appearance ===
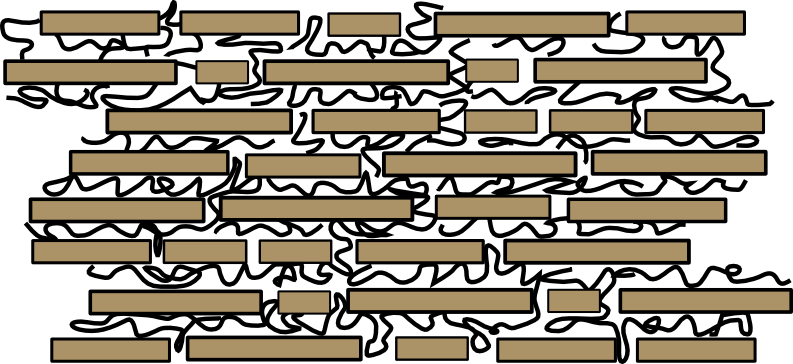
Schematic of the microscopic structure of nacre layers

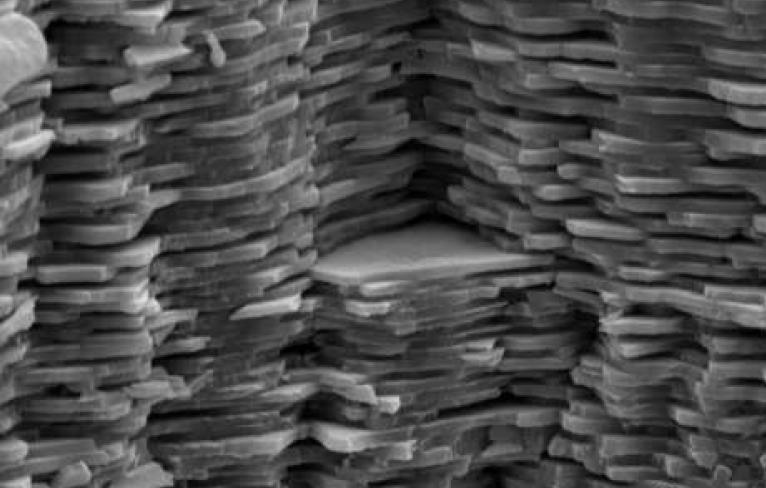
Electron microscopy image of a fractured surface of nacre

Nacre is composed of hexagonal platelets, called tablets, of aragonite (a form of calcium carbonate) 10–20 μm wide and 0.5 μm thick arranged in continuous parallel lamina. Depending on the species, the shape of the tablets differs; in Pinna, the tablets are rectangular, with symmetric sectors more or less soluble. Whatever the shape of the tablets, the smallest units they contain are irregular rounded granules. These layers are separated by sheets of organic matrix (interfaces) composed of elastic biopolymers (such as chitin, lustrin and silk-like proteins).

Nacre appears iridescent because the thickness of the aragonite platelets is close to the wavelength of visible light. These structures interfere constructively and destructively with different wavelengths of light at different viewing angles, creating structural colours.

The crystallographic c-axis points approximately perpendicular to the shell wall, but the direction of the other axes varies between groups. Adjacent tablets have been shown to have dramatically different c-axis orientation, generally randomly oriented within ~20° of vertical. In bivalves and cephalopods, the b-axis points in the direction of shell growth, whereas in the monoplacophora it is the a-axis that is inclined this way.

=== Mechanical properties ===
This mixture of brittle platelets and the thin layers of elastic biopolymers makes the material strong and resilient, with a Young's modulus of 70 GPa and a yield stress of roughly 70 MPa (when dry). Strength and resilience are also likely to be due to adhesion by the "brickwork" arrangement of the platelets, which inhibits transverse crack propagation. This structure, spanning multiple length sizes, greatly increases its toughness, making it almost as strong as silicon. The mineral–organic interface results in enhanced resilience and strength of the organic interlayers. The interlocking of bricks of nacre has large impact on both the deformation mechanism as well as its toughness. Tensile, shear, and compression tests, Weibull analysis, nanoindentation, and other techniques have all been used to probe the mechanical properties of nacre. Theoretical and computational methods have also been developed to explain the experimental observations of nacre's mechanical behavior. Nacre is stronger under compressive loads than tensile ones when the force is applied parallel or perpendicular to the platelets. As an oriented structure, nacre is highly anisotropic and as such, its mechanical properties are also dependent on the direction.

A variety of toughening mechanisms are responsible for nacre's mechanical behavior. The adhesive force needed to separate the proteinaceous and the aragonite phases is high, indicating that there are molecular interactions between the components. In laminated structures with hard and soft layers, a model system that can be applied to understand nacre, the fracture energy and fracture strength are both larger than those values characteristic of the hard material only. Specifically, this structure facilitates crack deflection, since it is easier for the crack to continue into the viscoelastic and compliant organic matrix than going straight into another aragonite platelet. This results in the ductile protein phase deforming such that the crack changes directions and avoids the brittle ceramic phase. Based on experiments done on nacre-like synthetic materials, it is hypothesized that the compliant matrix needs to have a larger fracture energy than the elastic energy at fracture of the hard phase. Fiber pull-out, which occurs in other ceramic composite materials, contributes to this phenomenon. Unlike in traditional synthetic composites, the aragonite in nacre forms bridges between individual tablets, so the structure is not only held together by the strong adhesion of the ceramic phase to the organic one, but also by these connecting nanoscale features. As plastic deformation starts, the mineral bridges may break, creating small asperities that roughen the aragonite-protein interface. The additional friction generated by the asperities helps the material withstand shear stresses. In nacre-like composites, the mineral bridges have also been shown to increase the flexural strength of the material because they can transfer stress in the material. Developing synthetic composites that exhibit similar mechanical properties as nacre is of interest to scientists working on developing stronger materials. To achieve these effects, researchers take inspiration from nacre and use synthetic ceramics and polymers to mimic the "brick-and-mortar" structure, mineral bridges, and other hierarchical features.

When dehydrated, nacre loses much of its strength and acts as a brittle material, like pure aragonite. The hardness of this material is also negatively impacted by dehydration. Water acts as a plasticizer for the organic matrix, improving its toughness and reducing its shear modulus. Hydrating the protein layer also decreases its Young's modulus, which is expected to improve the fracture energy and strength of a composite with alternating hard and soft layers.

The statistical variation of the platelets has a negative effect on the mechanical performance (stiffness, strength, and energy absorption) because statistical variation precipitates localization of deformation. However, the negative effects of statistical variations can be offset by interfaces with large strain at failure accompanied by strain hardening. On the other hand, the fracture toughness of nacre increases with moderate statistical variations which creates tough regions where the crack gets pinned. But, higher statistical variations generates very weak regions which allows the crack to propagate without much resistance causing the fracture toughness to decrease. Studies have shown that this weak structural defects act as dissipative topological defects coupled by an elastic distortion.

=== Formation ===
The process of how nacre is formed is not completely clear. It has been observed in Pinna nobilis, where it starts as tiny particles (~50–80 nm) grouping together inside a natural material. These particles line up in a way that resembles fibers, and they continue to multiply. When there are enough particles, they come together to form early stages of nacre. The growth of nacre is regulated by organic substances that determine how and when the nacre crystals start and develop.

Each crystal, which can be thought of as a "brick", is thought to rapidly grow to match the full height of the layer of nacre. They continue to grow until they meet the surrounding bricks. This produces the hexagonal close-packing characteristic of nacre. The growth of these bricks can be initiated in various ways such as from randomly scattered elements within the organic layer, well-defined arrangements of proteins, or they may expand from mineral bridges coming from the layer underneath.

What sets nacre apart from fibrous aragonite, a similarly formed but brittle mineral, is the speed at which it grows in a certain direction (roughly perpendicular to the shell). This growth is slow in nacre, but fast in fibrous aragonite.

A 2021 paper in Nature Physics examined nacre from Unio pictorum, noting that in each case the initial layers of nacre laid down by the organism contained spiral defects. Defects that spiralled in opposite directions created distortions in the material that drew them towards each other as the layers built up until they merged and cancelled each other out. Later layers of nacre were found to be uniform and ordered in structure.

=== Function ===
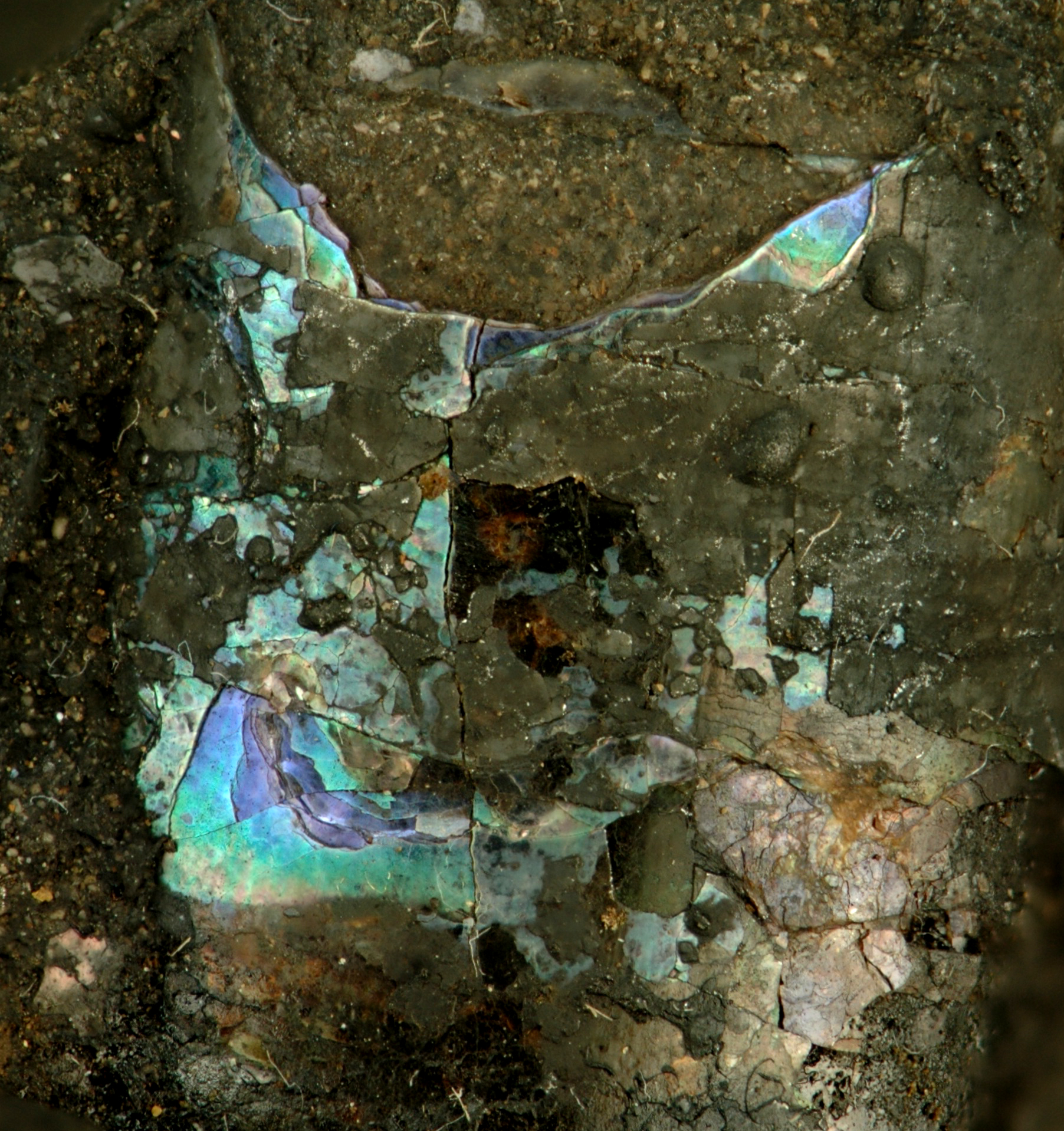
Fossil nautiloid shell with original iridescent nacre in fossiliferous asphaltic limestone, Oklahoma. Dated to the late Middle Pennsylvanian, which makes it by far the oldest deposit in the world with aragonitic nacreous shelly fossils.

Nacre is secreted by the epithelial cells of the mantle tissue of various molluscs. The nacre is continuously deposited onto the inner surface of the shell, the iridescent nacreous layer, commonly known as mother-of-pearl. The layers of nacre smooth the shell surface and help defend the soft tissues against parasites and damaging debris by entombing them in successive layers of nacre, forming either a blister pearl attached to the interior of the shell, or a free pearl within the mantle tissues. The process is called encystation and it continues as long as the mollusc lives.

=== In different mollusc groups ===
The form of nacre varies from group to group. In bivalves, the nacre layer is formed of single crystals in a hexagonal close packing. In gastropods, crystals are twinned, and in cephalopods, they are pseudohexagonal monocrystals, which are often twinned.

== Commercial sources ==
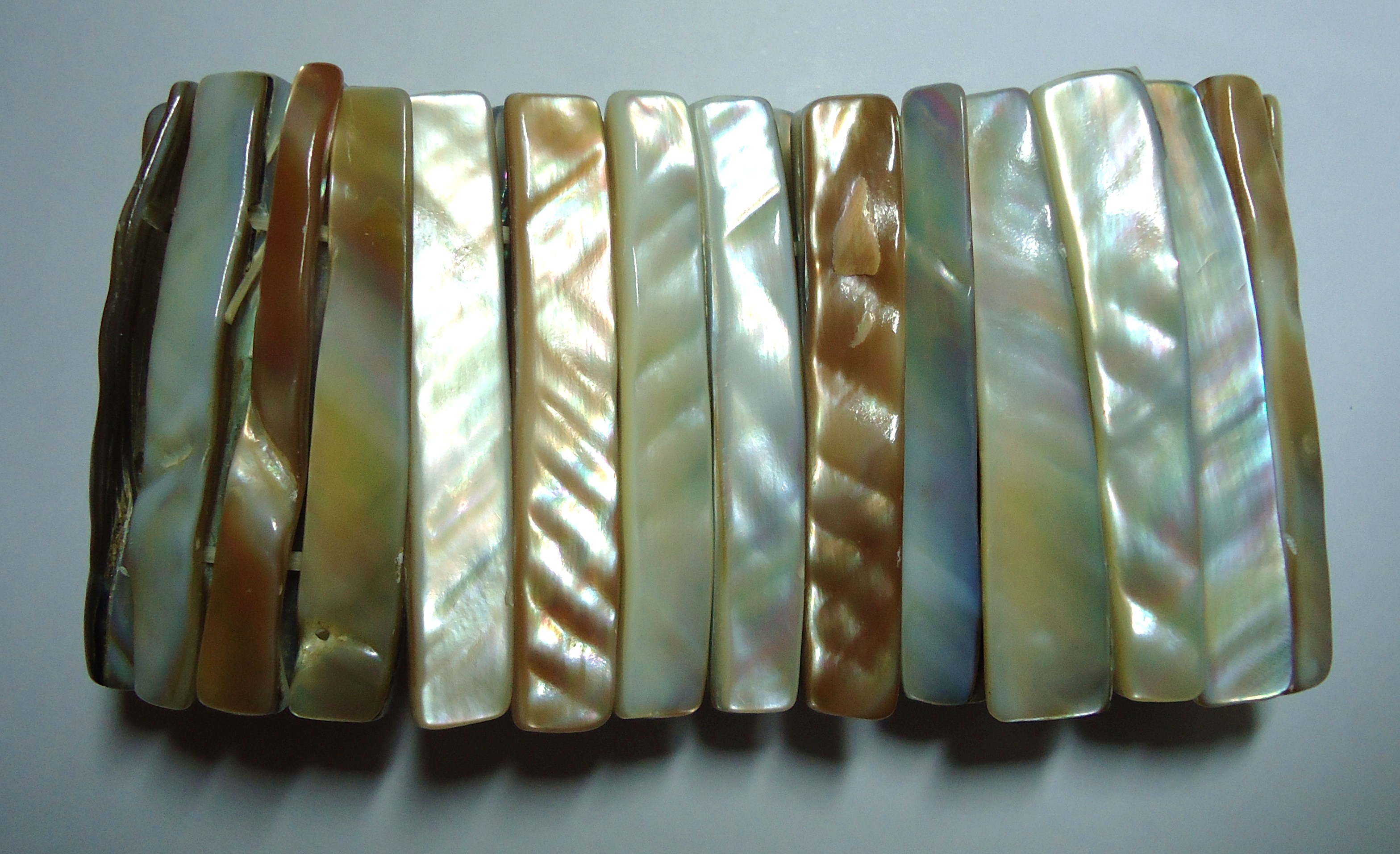
Bars of nacre

The main commercial sources of mother-of-pearl have been the pearl oyster, freshwater pearl mussels, and to a lesser extent the abalone, popular for their sturdiness and beauty in the latter half of the 19th century.

Widely used for pearl buttons especially during the 1900s, were the shells of the great green turban snail Turbo marmoratus and the large top snail, Tectus niloticus. The international trade in mother-of-pearl is governed by the Convention on International Trade in Endangered Species of Wild Fauna and Flora, an agreement signed by more than 170 countries.

== Uses ==
=== Decorative ===
==== Architecture ====
Both black and white nacre are used for architectural purposes. The natural nacre may be artificially tinted to almost any color. Nacre tesserae may be cut into shapes and laminated to a ceramic tile or marble base. The tesserae are hand-placed and closely sandwiched together, creating an irregular mosaic or pattern (such as a weave). The laminated material is typically about 2 millimetres (0.079 in) thick. The tesserae are then lacquered and polished creating a durable and glossy surface. Instead of using a marble or tile base, the nacre tesserae can be glued to fiberglass. The result is a lightweight material that offers a seamless installation and there is no limit to the sheet size. Nacre sheets may be used on interior floors, exterior and interior walls, countertops, doors and ceilings. Insertion into architectural elements, such as columns or furniture is easily accomplished.

==== Jewelry ====
Mother of pearl is commonly used in jewelry due to its smooth texture and iridescent appearance. It is sourced from the inner layer of mollusk shells, such as oysters and abalones.

Mother of pearl is frequently crafted into earrings, pendants, rings, bracelets, and brooches. It can be carved into various shapes or inlaid into metal settings, often combined with gold, silver, or gemstones. The material is valued for its natural luster and the subtle color variations it displays, which can include white, cream, pink, and green.

==== Musical instruments ====
Nacre inlay is often used for music keys and other decorative motifs on musical instruments. Many accordion and concertina bodies are completely covered in nacre, and some guitars have fingerboard or headstock inlays made of nacre (or imitation pearloid plastic inlays). The bouzouki and baglamas (Greek plucked string instruments of the lute family) typically feature nacre decorations, as does the related Middle Eastern oud (typically around the sound holes and on the back of the instrument). Bows of stringed instruments such as the violin and cello often have mother-of-pearl inlay at the frog. It is traditionally used on saxophone keytouches, as well as the valve buttons of trumpets and other brass instruments. The Middle Eastern goblet drum (darbuka) is commonly decorated by mother-of-pearl.

==== Indian mother-of-pearl art ====
At the end of 19th century, Anukul Munsi was the first artist who successfully carved the shells of oysters into the shape of a human being. For the British Empire Exhibition in 1924, he received a gold medal. His eldest son Annada Munshi is credited with drawing Indian Swadesi Movement in the form of Indian advertising. Anukul Charan Munshi's third son Manu Munshi was felt to be one of the finest mother-of-pearl artists in the middle of the 20th century. As the best example of "Charu and Karu art of Bengal," the former Chief Minister of West Bengal, Dr. Bidhan Chandra Roy, sent Manu's artwork, "Gandhiji's Noakhali Abhiyan", to the United States. Numerous figures, such as Satyajit Ray, Bidhan Chandra Roy, Barrister Subodh Chandra Roy, Subho Tagore, Humayun Kabir, Jehangir Kabir, as well as his elder brother Annada Munshi, were among the patrons of his works of art. "Indira Gandhi" was one of his famous mother of pearl works of art. He is credited with portraying Tagore in various creative stances that were skillfully carved into metallic plates. His cousin Pratip Munshi was also a mother-of-pearl artist.

==== Other ====
Mother-of-pearl buttons are used in clothing either for functional or decorative purposes. The Pearly Kings and Queens are an elaborate example of this.

Mother-of-pearl is sometimes used to make caviar spoons (i.e. caviar servers) so as to not spoil the taste of the caviar with metallic spoons.

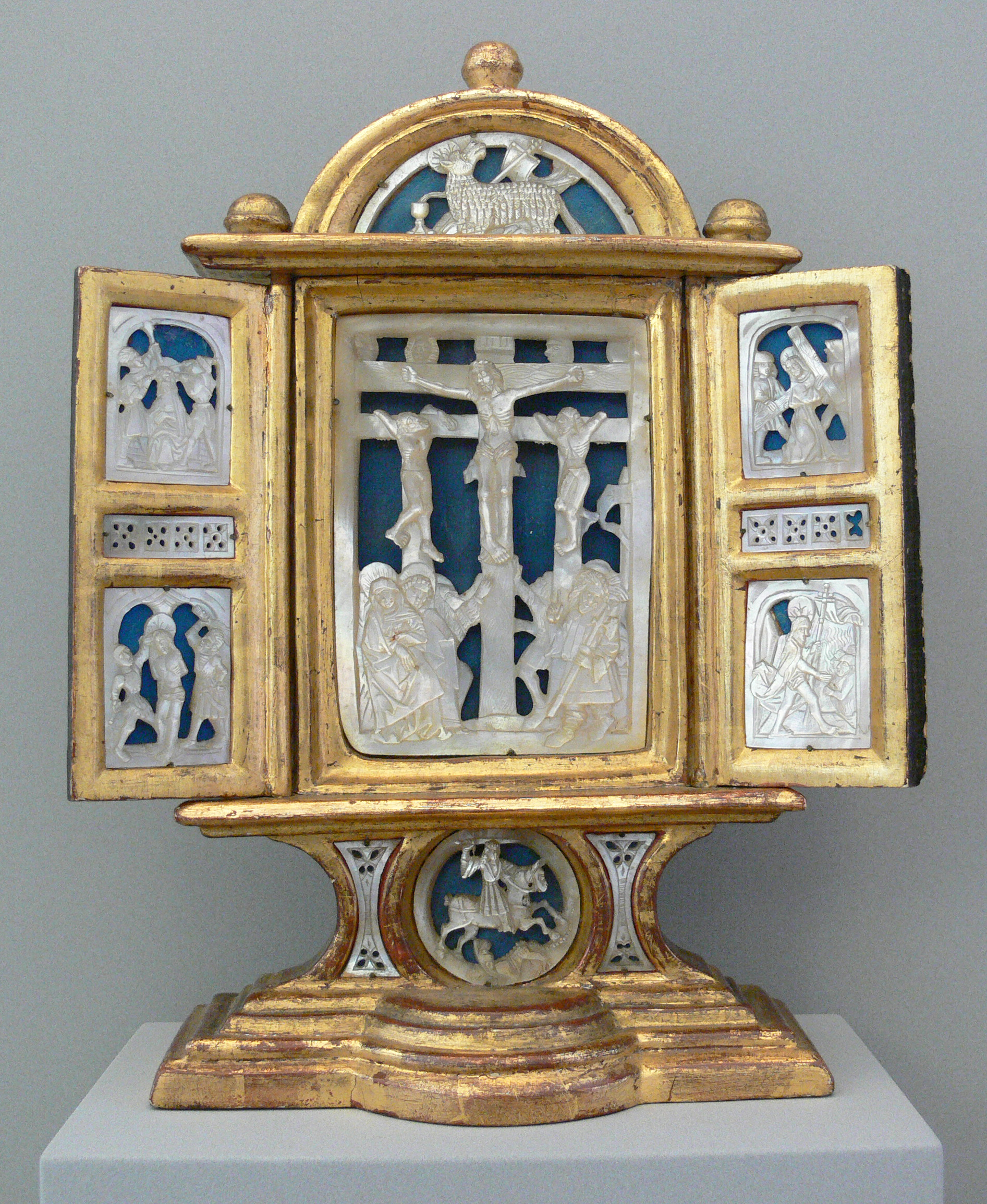
Altarpiece, c. 1520, with extensive use of carved nacre

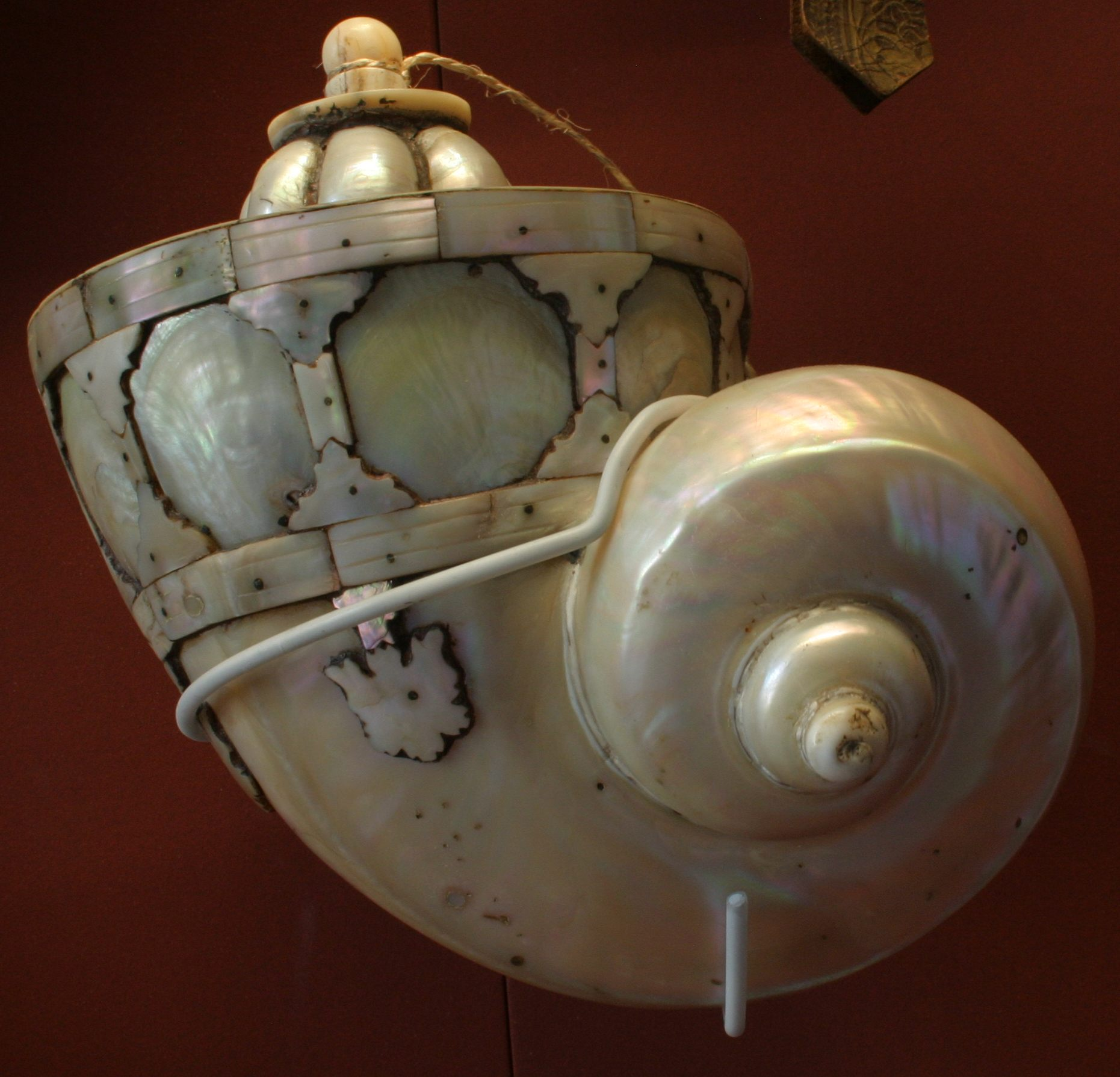
Nacre gunpowder flask, c. 1750, mostly made of Turbo marmoratus shell

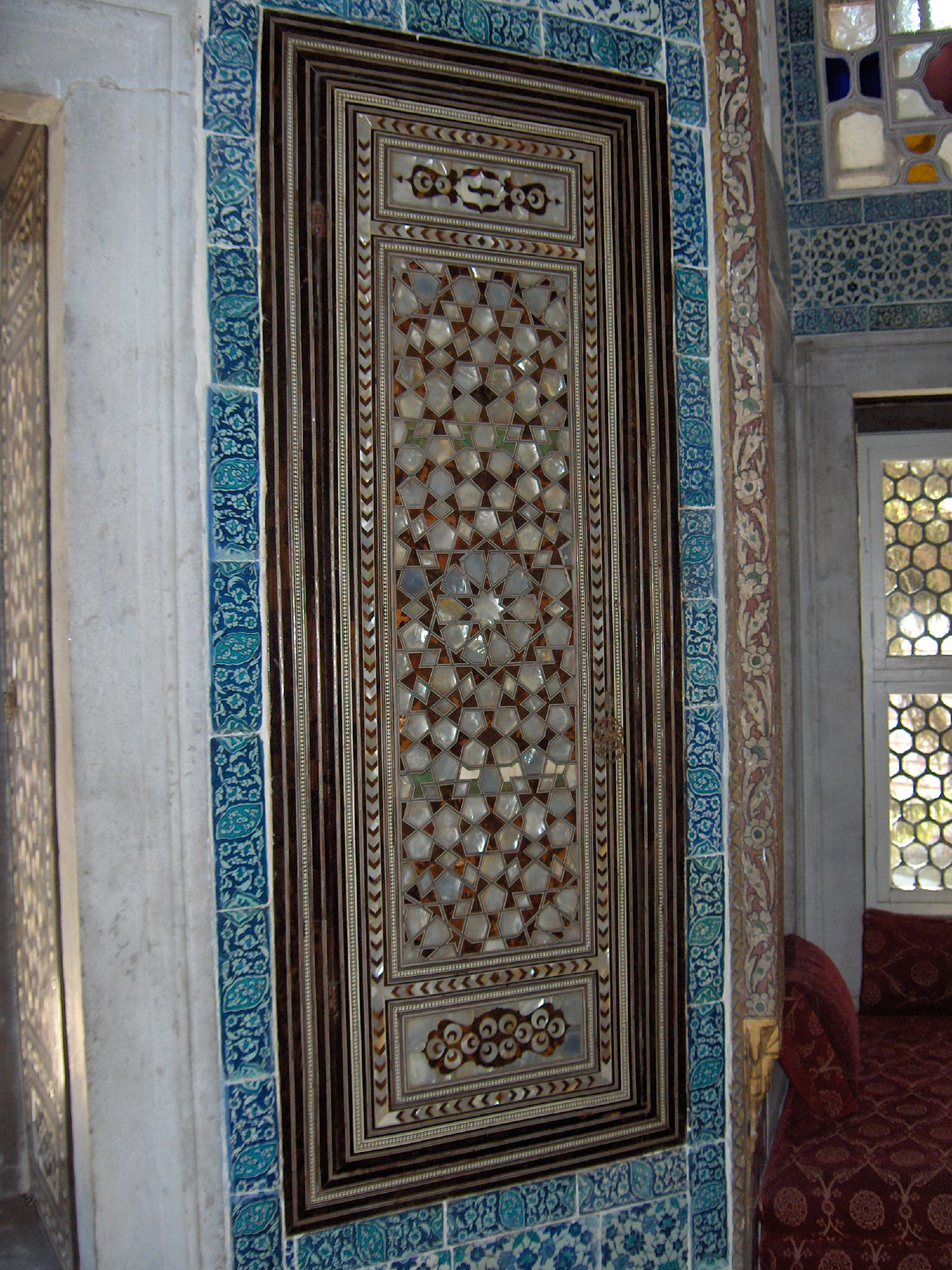
Inlay with nacre tesserae, Topkapı Palace, Istanbul

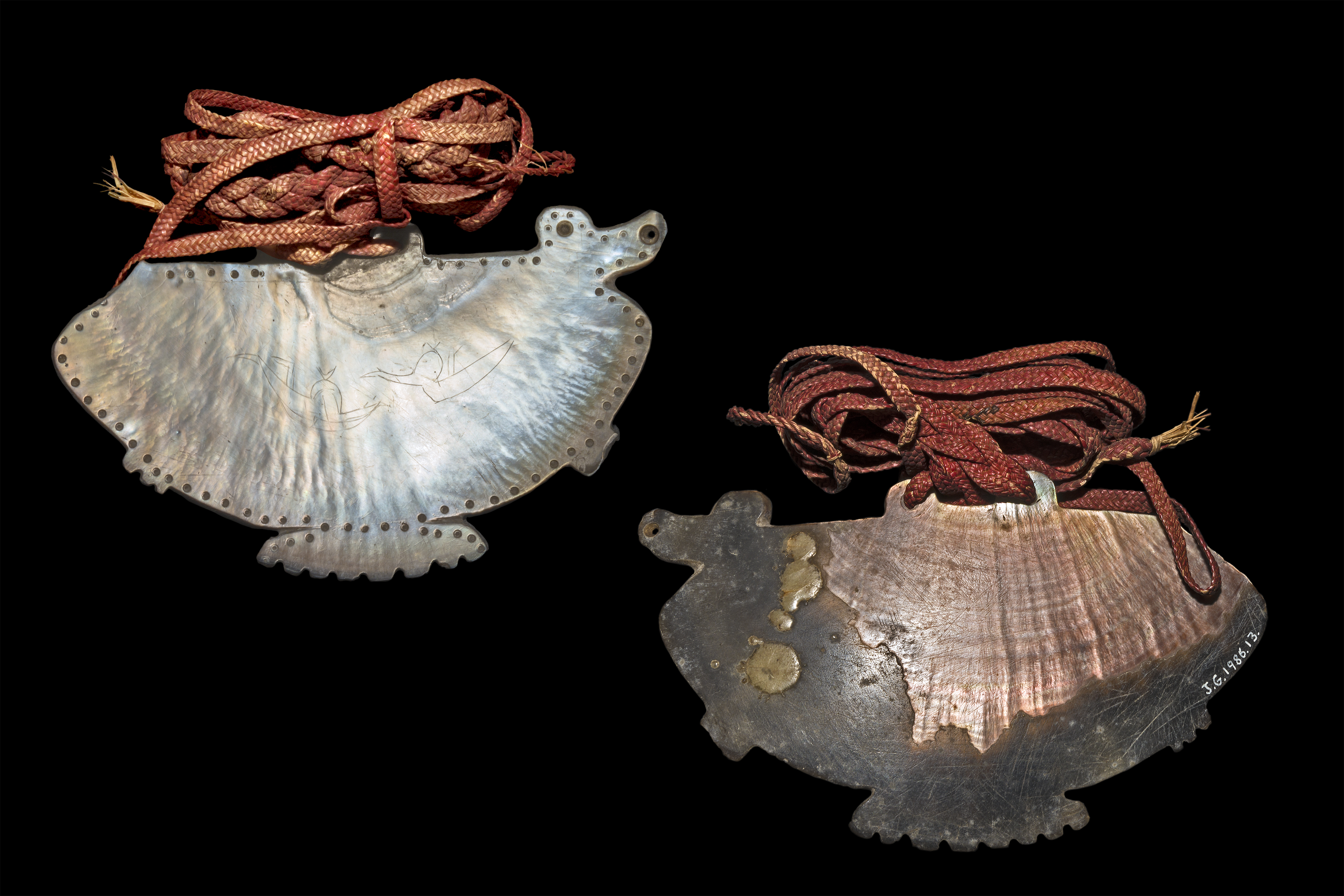
Engraved nacre pendant, Solomon Islands 1838

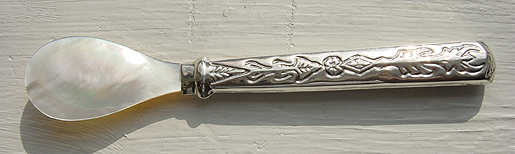
Mother-of-pearl caviar spoon with sterling silver handle

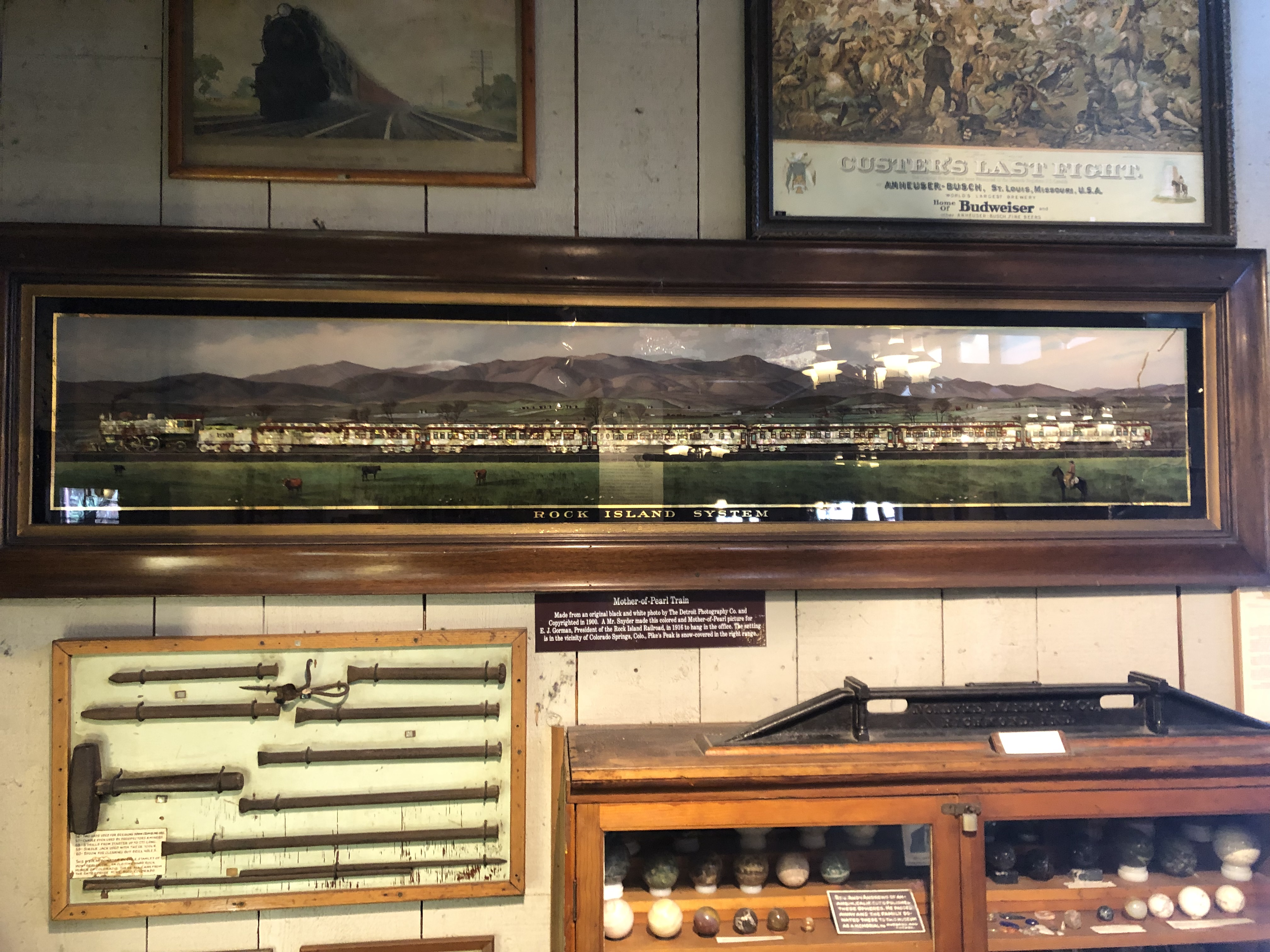
Train photo enhanced with mother of pearl. Made for display in the office of E. J. Gorman, president of the Chicago, Rock Island & Pacific RR. Now at the Western Trails Museum, Knott's Berry Farm, Buena Park, California.

== Manufactured nacre ==
In 2012, researchers created calcium-based nacre in the laboratory by mimicking its natural growth process.

In 2014, researchers used lasers to create an analogue of nacre by engraving networks of wavy 3D "micro-cracks" in glass. When the slides were subjected to an impact, the micro-cracks absorbed and dispersed the energy, keeping the glass from shattering. Altogether, treated glass was reportedly 200 times tougher than untreated glass.

== See also ==
- Ammolite
- Mother-of-pearl carving in Bethlehem
- Pearling in Western Australia
- Raden
