= Byne's disease =

Mollusk disease

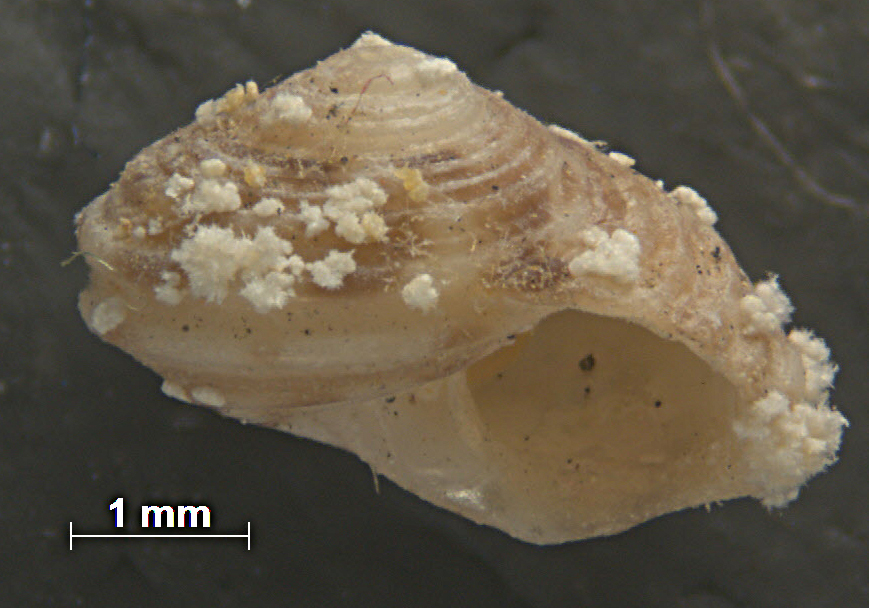
An affected gastropod shell (a juvenile Agathistoma) from a museum collection

Byne's disease, more accurately known as Bynesian decay, is a peculiar and permanently damaging condition resulting from an ongoing chemical reaction which often attacks mollusk shells and other calcareous specimens that are in storage or on display for long periods of time. It is a form of efflorescence of salts formed by the reaction of acidic vapors with the basic calcareous surface. The efflorescence can sometimes superficially resemble a growth of mold. Although first described in the early 19th century, Bynesian decay was not well understood until almost a hundred years later. The condition is named after the man (Loftus Byne) who is best known for describing it in the late 19th century, even though he was not the first person to describe it in print. In addition, Byne mistakenly assumed that the condition was caused by bacteria, and thus the condition came to be referred to as a "disease".

In addition to mollusk shells, various other natural history specimens are susceptible to this form of decay, including eggshells and some fossils and mineral samples that are composed of calcium carbonate. This condition is of concern for museum scientists, and also for anyone who has a private collection of specimens of these kinds. In order to avoid Bynesian decay, the use of metal, non-reactive polymers and acid-free materials of archival quality are preferred over common paper, wood-based materials, ordinary glues and varnishes in collection environments. Management of affected specimens includes washing and thorough drying, with a subsequent reallocation to an archival setting.

== Appearance ==
Crystallized salt clusters (efflorescence) produced by Byne's disease on a gastropod shell's surface

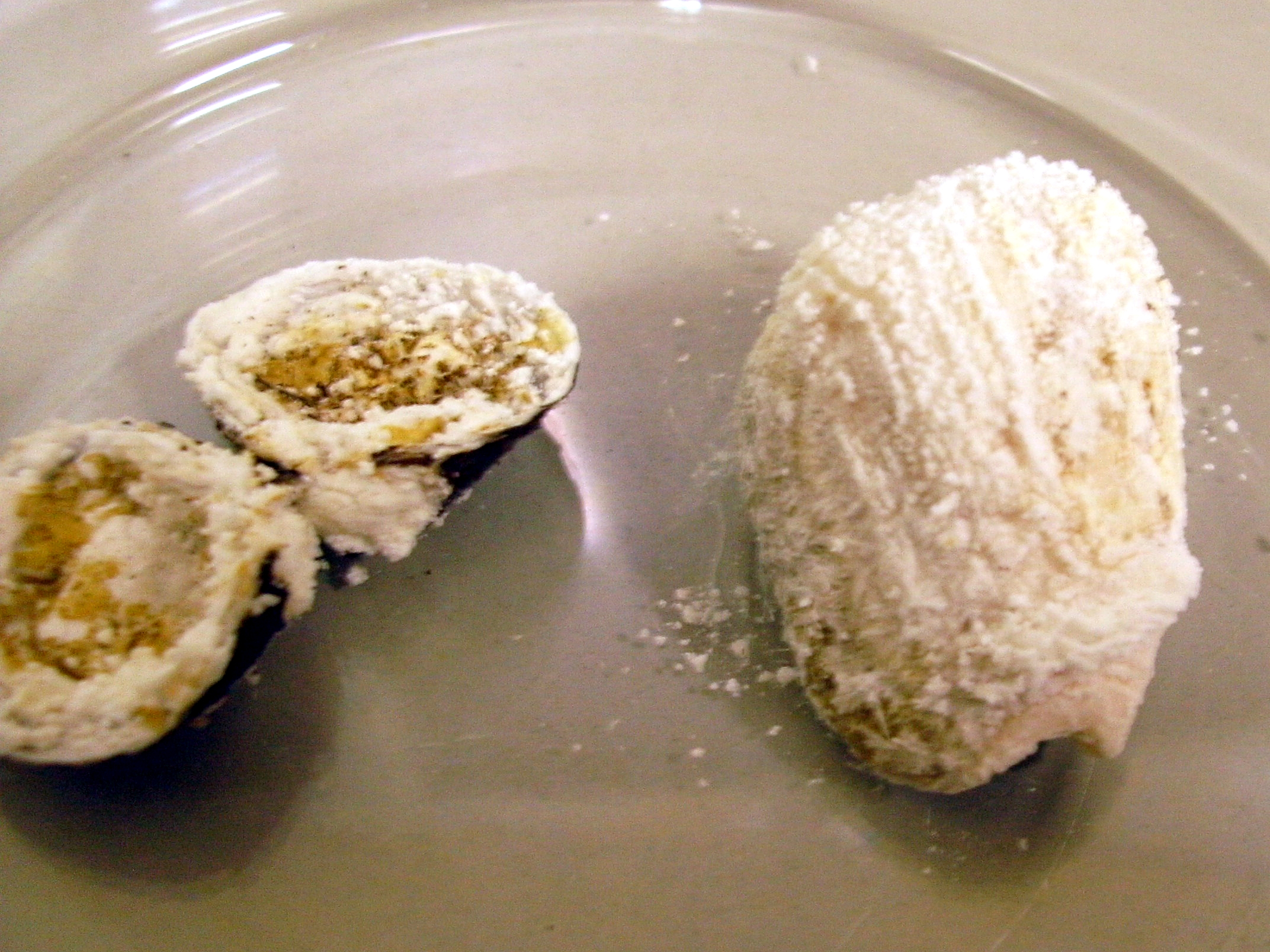
Some affected mollusk shells. The efflorescence is clearly visible in both specimens. This decay was deliberately produced under extreme conditions.

Byne's disease can appear as a powdery white coating on a shell or other calcareous specimen. It also often looks as if the specimen has been "infected" with mold; however, under magnification, the mold-like appearance is revealed to be a crystalline growth of salts.

== History ==
In 1839, the British naturalist and malacologist Thomas Brown (1785–1862) briefly mentioned this form of deterioration in his book A Conchologist's Text-Book. Agnes Kenyon also described the condition in 1896, suggesting that "saline particles in the atmosphere [were] evidently exerting a corrosive effect".

Origin of the name

In 1899, the British amateur conchologist and naturalist Loftus St. George Byne (1872–1947) described this condition, in a presentation to the Conchological Society of Great Britain in Ireland, and did so again in another presentation in June of that same year.

...a dullness first pervading the exterior of certain smooth species more markedly e.g. Conus, Cypraea, and especially Naticidae. Then grey acid efflorescence, both tasting and smelling strongly of vinegar covers the whole surface like a powder, rising doubtless from the interior, and the specimens are soon almost irretrievably ruined.

Byne was convinced that butyric acid was present together with calcium acetate in the affected shells, although he never really described the methods he used in the so-called "extensive chemical tests" he claimed to have applied to these specimens. Among other conclusions, he assumed that the butyric acid originated from bacterial activity. He also concluded that the decaying effect 'travelled from shell to shell and drawer to drawer', and thus the condition came to be called a "disease".

Clarification and resolution

The true nature of the "disease" was partially clarified in 1934, when the British government chemist John Ralph Nicholls explained that oak cabinets at the Natural History Museum in London were giving off acetic acid fumes, which were attacking the shells stored in them.

In 1985, almost 150 years after the Byne's disease was first mentioned in the literature, Norman H. Tennent and Thomas Baird published an extensive study on the subject. Their deep analysis, involving many complex and sophisticated techniques such as X-Ray diffraction, infrared spectroscopy, thermogravimetric analysis and nuclear magnetic resonance spectroscopy, finally revealed the true nature of the decaying process. They identified the substances involved (the calcium salts), as well as the chemical reactions that originated them. They concluded that Byne's disease is not actually a disease, and is in fact caused by simple chemical reactions which occur in the presence of acidic vapors originating from the immediate environment in which the specimens are stored.

== Chemistry ==
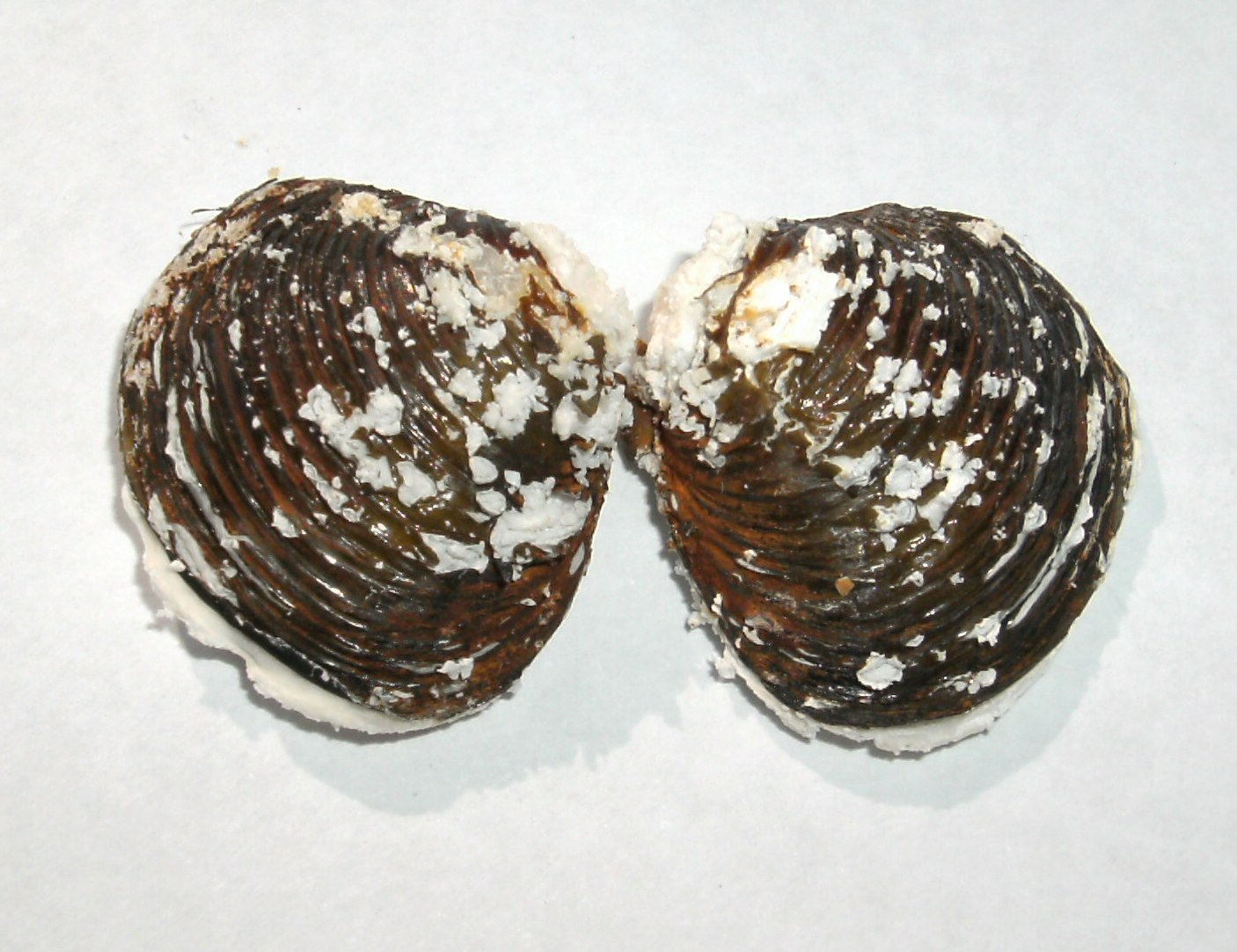
A shell of Corbicula fluminea, a freshwater bivalve, which has been exposed to damp and acidic air. This decay was deliberately produced under extreme conditions. The dark periostracum in this shell is a normal variant.

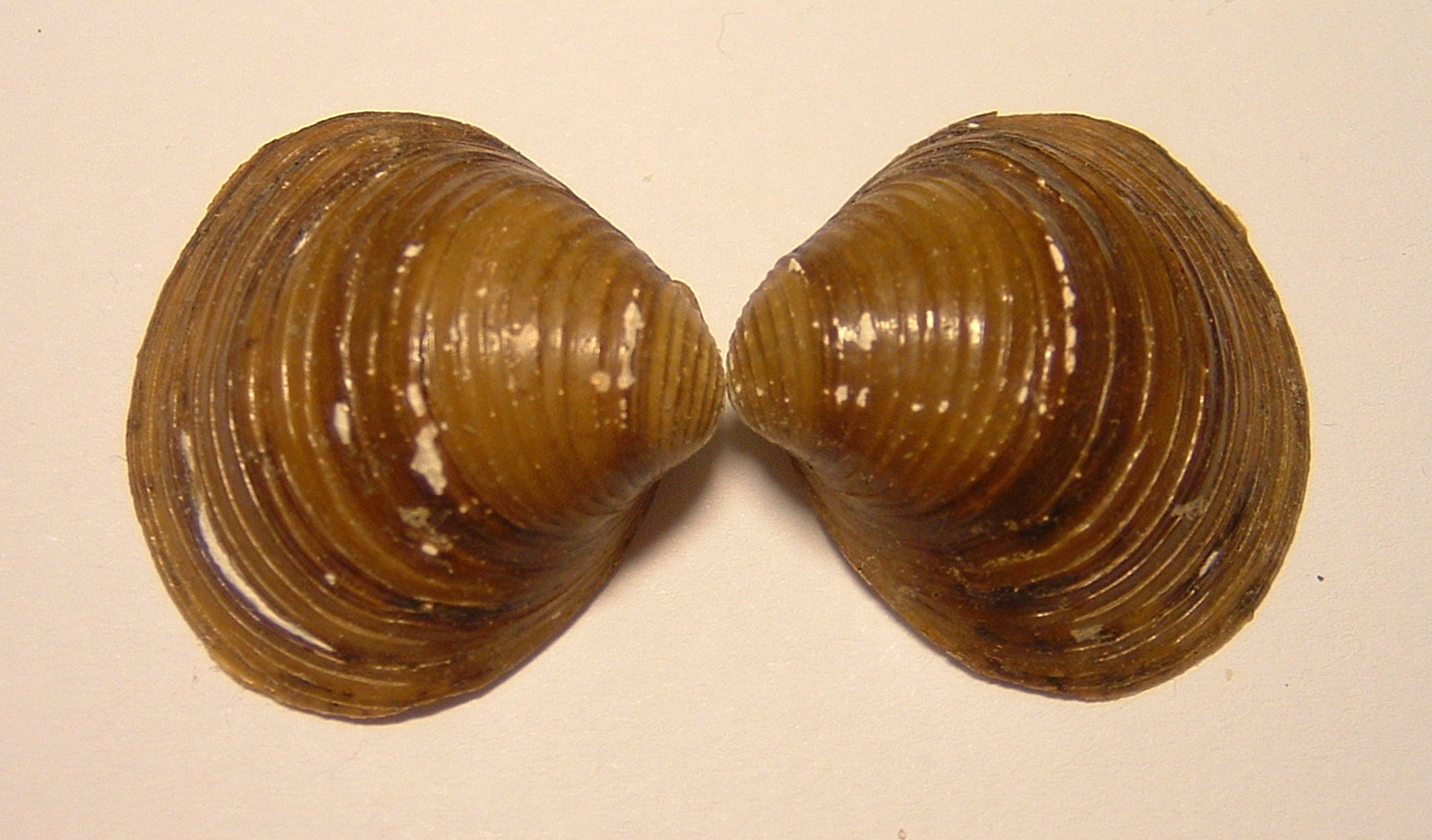
A lighter colored and undamaged shell of Corbicula fluminea

Bynesian decay usually starts when specimens are stored or displayed for considerable periods of time in an enclosed space. The storage method itself usually causes this problem, when containers, cabinets or display cases are entirely or partially made of wood, plywood or other wood products such as Masonite, or when the specimens are surrounded by, or in contact with, various other kinds of materials that are cellulose-based and can turn water vapor acidic.

Other potentially damaging materials include non-archival quality cardboard, card, paper, cotton and cork, all of which give off acidic vapors over time. PVC and polyurethane plastics are also a problem, as they also degrade and give off acidic vapors with time. High humidity of the air is a significant contributing factor, as is lack of ventilation of the specimens. High ambient temperatures can increase the rapidity of the decay.

Generally, in cabinets or display cases that are entirely or partially made of wood, the hydrolysis of acetyl groups in the wood hemicelluloses creates acetic acid. The rate at which the acetic acid is produced is proportional to the concentration of esters in the wood, the humidity, the temperature, and the overall acidity of the environment. Acidic fumes can also be released from formaldehyde which can occur in wood as a degradation product of lignin. Acidic fumes can also be given off from ubiquitous formaldehyde resins (commonly urea-formaldehyde resins).

In the first case, acetic acid reacts with the calcium carbonate (one of the main components of freshwater, marine and land shells, birds' eggs and other such specimens) producing calcium acetate, a salt. Formaldehyde can be oxidized by the oxygen in air to create formic acid, which then has basically the same effects as acetic acid, reacting with calcium carbonate to produce a salt. The salts (calcium acetate and calcium formate) crystallize through the specimen's outer surface, destroying its fine detail and exposing more areas for further reaction. As the condition progresses, the salt crystals build up over the specimen's surface, which becomes increasingly eroded.

The calcium carbonate and acetic acid chemical reaction occurs as follows:

CaCO_{3} + 2CH_{3}COOH → Ca(CH_{3}COO)_{2} + H_{2}O + CO_{2}

Calcium carbonate and formic acid chemical reaction occurs as follows:

CaCO_{3} + 2CH_{2}O_{2} → Ca(HCOO)_{2} + H_{2}O + CO_{2}

Calcium carbonate and sulfuric acid chemical reaction occurs as follows:

CaCO_{3} + H_{2}SO_{4} → CaSO_{4} + H_{2}O + CO_{2}

In this last reaction, calcium carbonate reacts with sulfuric acid and produces calcium sulfate, water and carbon dioxide.

== Prevention and management ==
When specimens are to be placed in any size of container for long-term storage or display, the consistent use of only archival-quality materials prevents the development of Byne's disease. Thus, materials such as metal cabinets and display cases, archival quality paper labels and card trays are used in museum collections of specimens that might be vulnerable to this reaction. It is also worth mentioning that sea shells, after collecting, need to be washed thoroughly in freshwater to remove the salt that is on and in the shell, and then dried thoroughly before they are stored. Salt attracts moisture and makes shells more vulnerable to Bynesian decay.

The following is a chart that shows non-archival materials and their archival equivalents:

Traditional non-archival materials	Archival materials without acidic fumes
wood, plywood, masonite	metal
paper	acid-free paper
card and cardboard	acid-free card
cork	polyester fiberfill
colored plastic foam	ethafoam: white polyethylene foam
ethylene vinyl acetate	mylar
ballpoint pen ink, other everyday inks	carbon ink (or pencil)
ordinary glue	archival glue
ordinary cellulose tape	archival cellulose tape
ordinary (polyetheylene) zipper storage bags	archival (polypropylene) zipper storage bags

If possible, the use of wood and wood products should be avoided entirely. Many varnishes and paints are well known emitters of volatile organic compounds (VOCs), some of which may be acidic, and thus have the potential to damage calcium carbonate specimens. Because of this, these coatings should also be avoided; water-based varnishes and paints are considered less harmful, and should be preferred.

Because the reactions involved in Bynesian decay require a certain quantity of moisture in the air in order for them to take place, keeping the air somewhat dry, i.e. keeping the environmental relative humidity under control is beneficial. This is achieved by careful monitoring of the relative humidity (using instruments such as a hygrometer), and applying dehumidifiers when necessary; sometimes, simple air conditioning systems may suffice. Extremely low humidity can damage some specimens, so caution is recommended. Usually, a relative humidity maintained around 50% is considered to be adequate. Applying sorbents containing a strong base, such as potassium hydroxide, inside the storage environment to protect the specimens against degradation is also possible. Copy paper or KOH-impregnated filter paper are some low cost examples of sorbents which can be used. These strong bases have a preference to react with acid, thus they compete successfully with the calcium carbonate specimens for any acidic vapors that may be present. The bases also help reduce the overall acid concentration inside the enclosed space.

The damage to specimens is unfortunately not reversible; however, the decay can be arrested by washing or soaking the specimens in water, followed by a very thorough drying. The specimens must then be placed in an environment that consists of only archival materials, in a completely archival setting.

== Pyrite disease ==
In collections that contain fossils, high humidity can also affect pyrite (or its polymorph marcasite) (iron disulfide) fossils in a somewhat similar condition, which is known as pyrite disease. The iron disulfide can react with water and oxygen to form iron sulfates and sulfuric acid, in a process sometimes termed Bynesian decay.
