= Caviar spoon =

Small, shallow bowl-like spoon

Mother of pearl caviar spoon

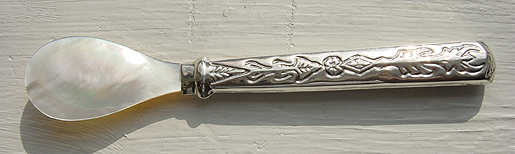
Mother of pearl caviar spoon, 14 cm (5 1/2 in), with engraved sterling silver handle

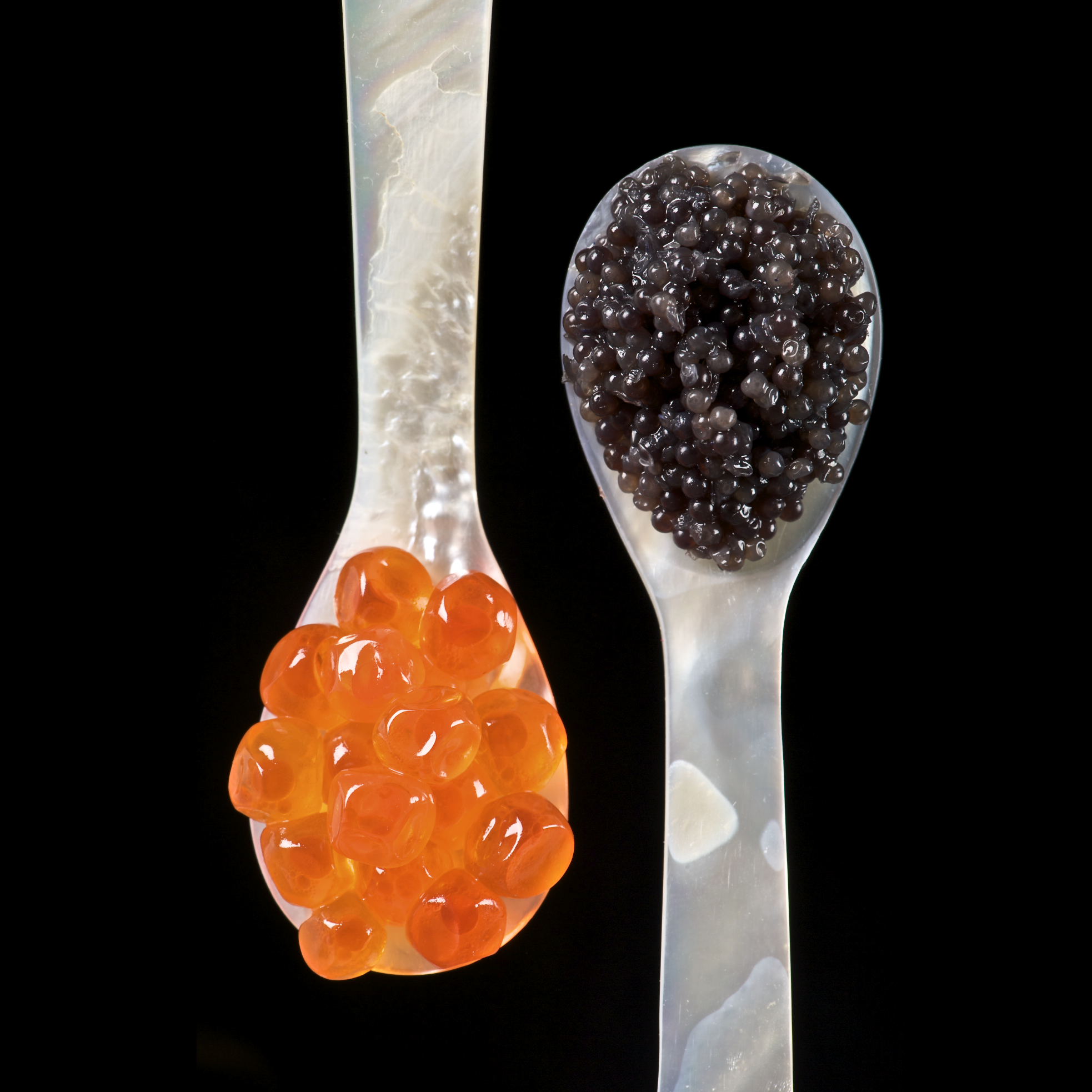
Caviar spoons with salmon roe (left) and caviar (right)

Caviar spoons are a type of spoon traditionally made of inert materials, such as animal horn, gold, mother of pearl, and wood. Other materials used for caviar spoons include bone, glass, and gold-plated metal. They range in length from 7 to 13 cm (2.7 to 5 in), and have a small shallow bowl that may be either oval or paddle shaped and a flat handle.

There is a custom that caviar should not be served with a metal spoon, because metal may impart an undesirable flavour. Though caviar is stored and sold in metal tins, non-reactive interior linings are put in place to prevent any adverse effects. Silver spoons are reactive, however, and thus may affect the flavor.

A caviar knife is frequently sold together with the spoon. It is a 5 inches long flat knife with a bulbous tip, typically also made of a fancy material like mother-of-pearl.

A caviar fork is a rare utensil introduced around 1840s. Sometimes, it is made from mother-of-pearl, too, but the ones from the Victorian times were frequently made of silver. Tiffany & Co. catalogue called a similar pattern an "oyster fork".

== See also ==
- Caviar bowl

== Sources ==
- Ettlinger, Steve (1992a). "Caviar Spoon". The Kitchenware Book. McMillan Publishing Company. pp. 375–376. ISBN 0-02-536302-6. OCLC 1256259403.
- Ettlinger, Steve (1992b). "Caviar Knife". The Kitchenware Book. McMillan Publishing Company. p. 375. ISBN 0-02-536302-6. OCLC 1256259403.
- Schollander, Wendell; Schollander, Wes (2002). Forgotten Elegance: The Art, Artifacts, and Peculiar History of Victorian and Edwardian Entertaining in America. Bloomsbury Academic. ISBN 978-0-313-31685-2.
