= Cobcrephora =

Scientific classification
- Kingdom: Animalia
- Phylum: Mollusca
- Class: Polyplacophora
- Genus: Cobcrephora Bischoff, 1981

Genus of molluscs

Cobcrephora is a genus of molluscs that resembles the Palaeoloricata, known from the Silurian of Gotland. Its interpretation as a polyplacophoran is widely challenged.

Its mollusc shell is unique, because Cobcrephora was described on the basis of isolated phosphatic sclerites. Its overlapping sclerites are arched and small, comprising two shell layers, and have lamellar projections.
