= Caviar bowl =

Tableware used for serving caviar

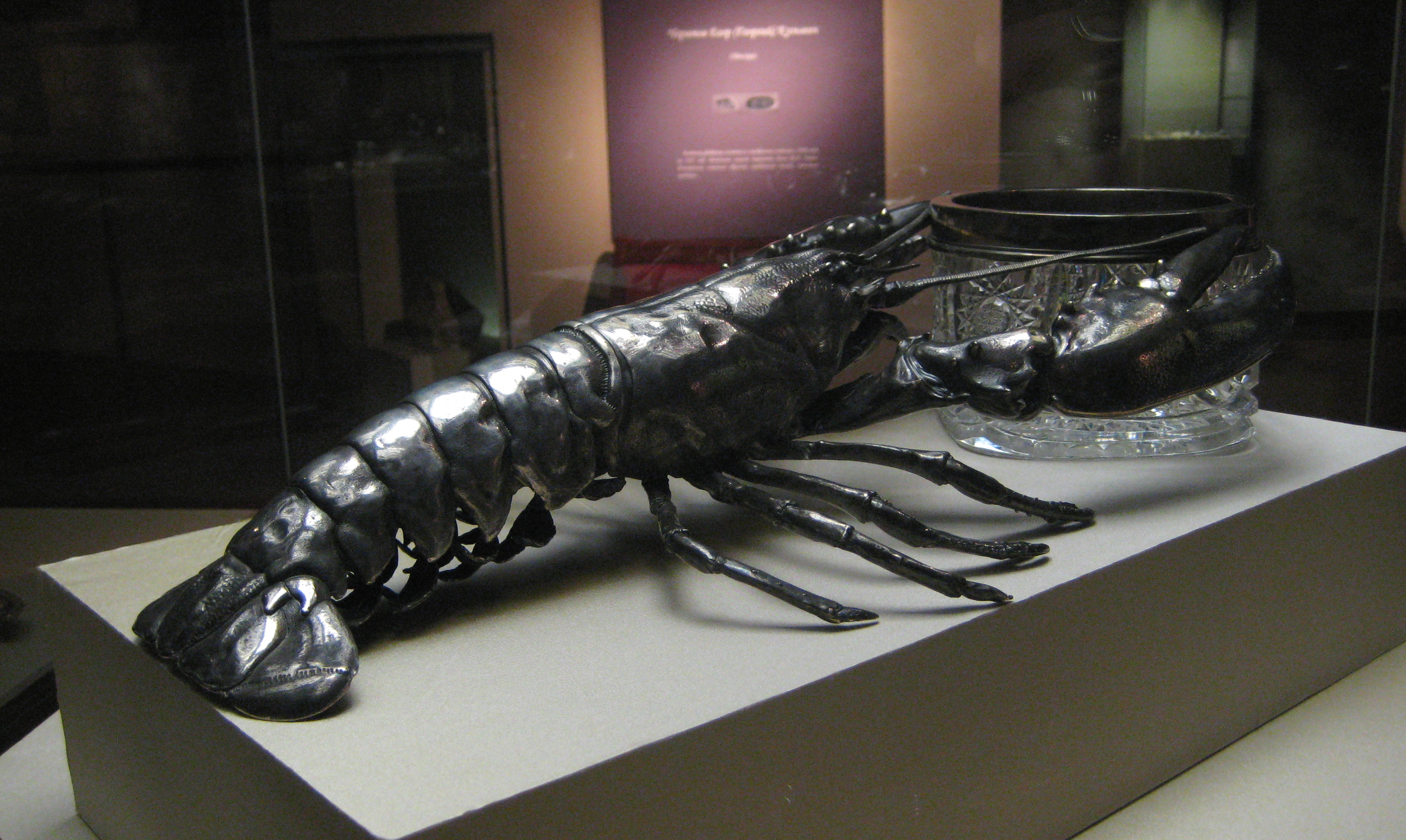
Caviar bowl in the shape of a crayfish

The caviar bowl is a piece of tableware used for serving caviar. Caviar is a highly perishable food and is therefore frequently served on ice, especially if offered before dinner or in a buffet arrangement. The typical caviar bowl is therefore made of two parts, with the outer one, to be used for ice, made of fine materials (silver plate, nickel-plated brass) in a fancy and decorative shape. The outer bowl can be used on its own for other dishes. Occasionally, the outer bowl is made of wood.

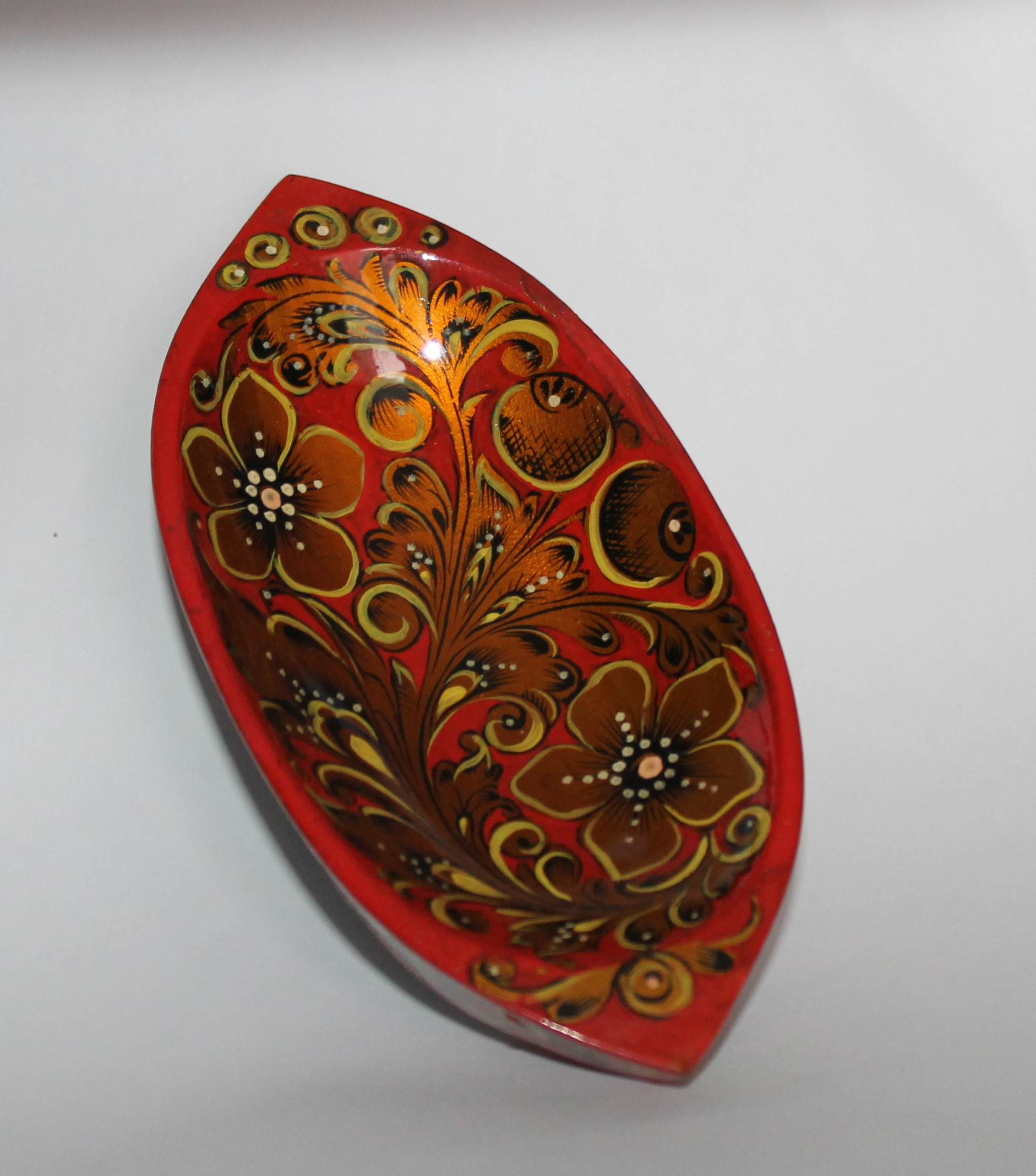
Wooden caviar bowl in Khokhloma style

The smaller vessel, for the caviar, is made of glass or crystal and inserted into the outer one, frequently has a lid. Its size is small, suitable typically for up to six servings (standard serving size is 50 grams, about 2 ounces), usually the inner container is designed for just 1–4 servings. If the caviar is passed around during the dinner, the outer bowl with ice is not necessary.

== See also ==
- Caviar spoon

== Sources ==
- Ettlinger, Steve (1992). "Caviar Bowl". The Kitchenware Book. McMillan Publishing Company. p. 375. ISBN 0-02-536302-6. OCLC 1256259403.
- Vogue (1969). "Caviar". Vogue's Book of Etiquette and Good Manners. Conde Nast. p. 315. ISBN 0-671-20115-8.
- Ратушный, А. С.; Аминов, С. С. (2017). "Икра зернистая осетровых пород" [Sturgeon Caviar]. Всё о еде от А до Я: Энциклопедия (in Russian). Москва: Издательско-торговая корпорация «Дашков и К°». p. 154. ISBN 978-5-394-02484-9.
- Яковлев, В. В. (2008). "Сервировка" [Table Setting]. Три века Санкт-Петербурга. Энциклопедия. Том 2. Девятнадцатый век. Книга 6. С — Т. (in Russian). Факультет филологии и искусств СПбГУ. p. 226. ISBN 9785846507685.
- Медведев, П. В.; Федотов, В.А. (2018). Изучение видов столового белья, столовой посуды и приборов на предприятиях общественного питания: методические указания [Study of types of table linen, tableware and cutlery in catering establishments] (in Russian). Оренбург: Оренбургский гос. ун-т.
