= Lustrin A =

Lustrin A is an insoluble protein used in the production of a nacreous layer in bivalve molluscs. It contributes to the properties of the nacreous layer, imparting resistance to cracking and elasticity. This is accomplished by its structure; it consists of many spring-like units which can expand when the shell is under extensional pressure. Its structure is similar to that of proteins involved in silica deposition in diatoms. It consists of 1428 amino acid residues. Its molecular weight is estimated to be 142 kDa. Its terminus consists of a protease inhibitor, which contributes to its longevity in the molluscan shell matrix.

== See also ==
- Nacre
- Mollusc shell
- Biomineralization
- Structural protein
