= Mollusc shell =

Exoskeleton of an animal in the phylum Mollusca

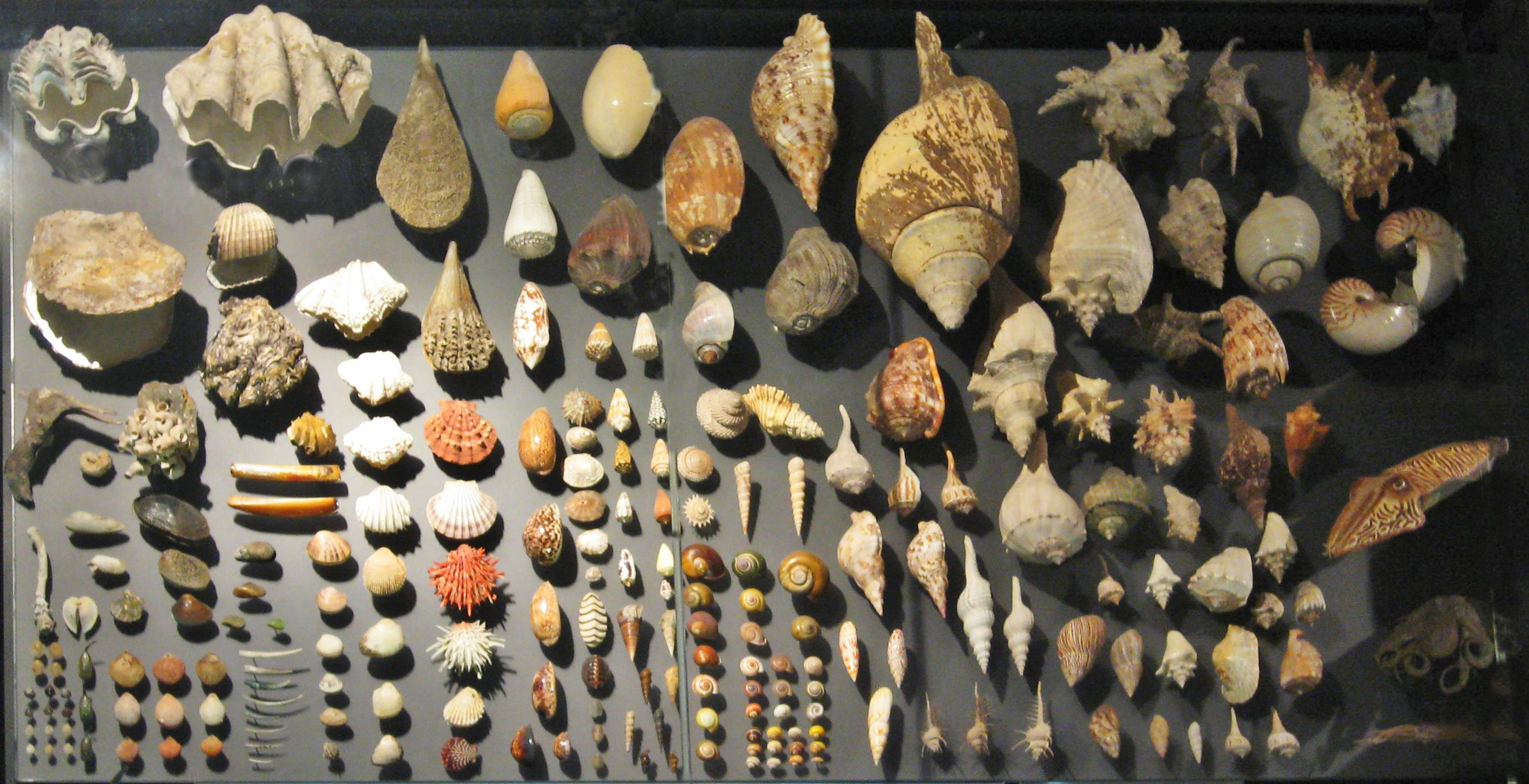
Diversity and variability of shells of molluscs on display.

The mollusc (or mollusk (Note: Often spelled "mollusk" in the USA; the spelling "mollusc" is preferred elsewhere.)) shell is typically a calcareous exoskeleton which encloses, supports and protects the soft parts of an animal in the phylum Mollusca, which includes snails, clams, tusk shells, and several other classes. In this phylum, the shell takes on various forms: in Gastropoda, many species bear the archetypical coiled shell of snails, while Bivalvians typically have two shells known as valves. In various groups, the shell has been reduced, often internalized and encased within the soft tissue, which is seen in slugs, sea slugs, and cephalopods of the subclass Coleoidea.

The ancestral mollusc is thought to have had a shell, but this has subsequently been lost or reduced on some families, such as the squid, octopus, and some smaller groups such as the caudofoveata and solenogastres. Today, over 100,000 living species bear a shell; there is some dispute as to whether these shell-bearing molluscs form a monophyletic group (Conchifera) or whether shell-less molluscs are interleaved into their family tree (thus shelled molluscs are not monophyletic).

Malacology, the scientific study of molluscs as living organisms, has a branch devoted to the study of shells called conchology, although both terms used to be – and to a minor extent still are – used interchangeably even by scientists (this is more common in Europe). The study of shell anatomy is important in mollusc classification; in some species, the features of the shell such as structure and coloration varies between individuals, which may lead to some confusion.

== Formation ==
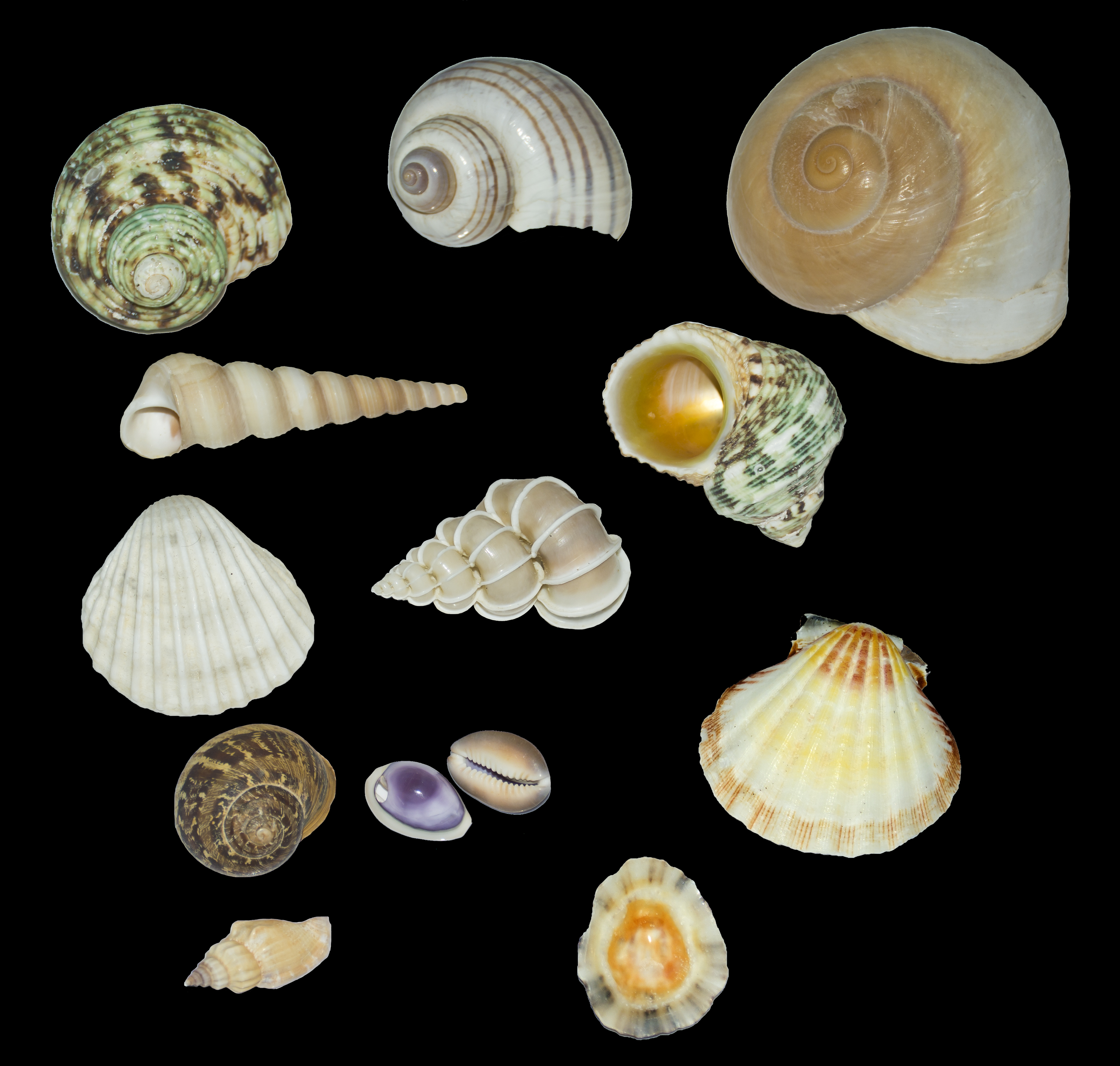
Variety of Mollusc shells (gastropods: land snail shells and seashells).

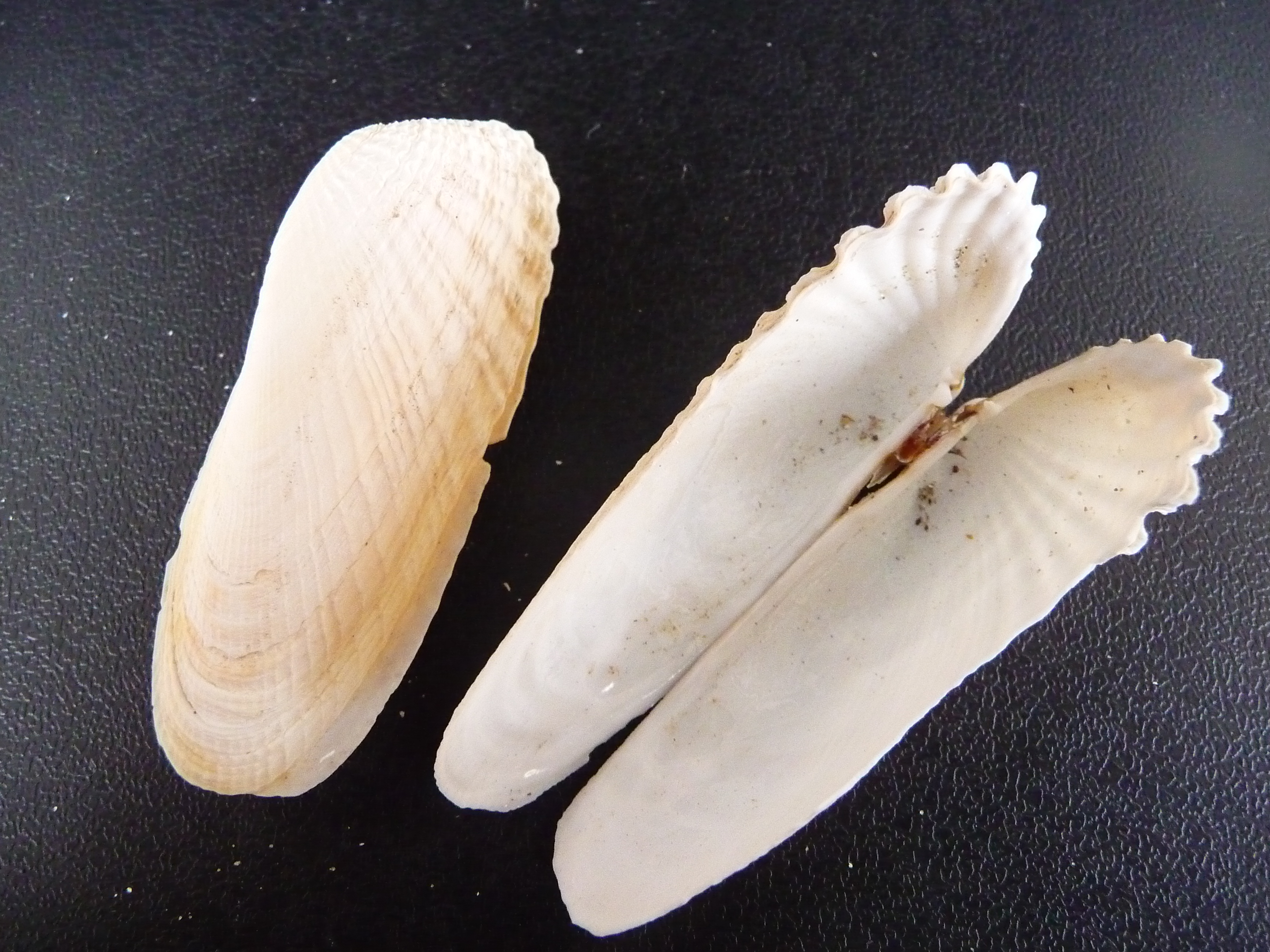
Closed and open shells of a marine bivalve, Petricola pholadiformis. A bivalve shell is composed of two hinged valves which are joined by a ligament.

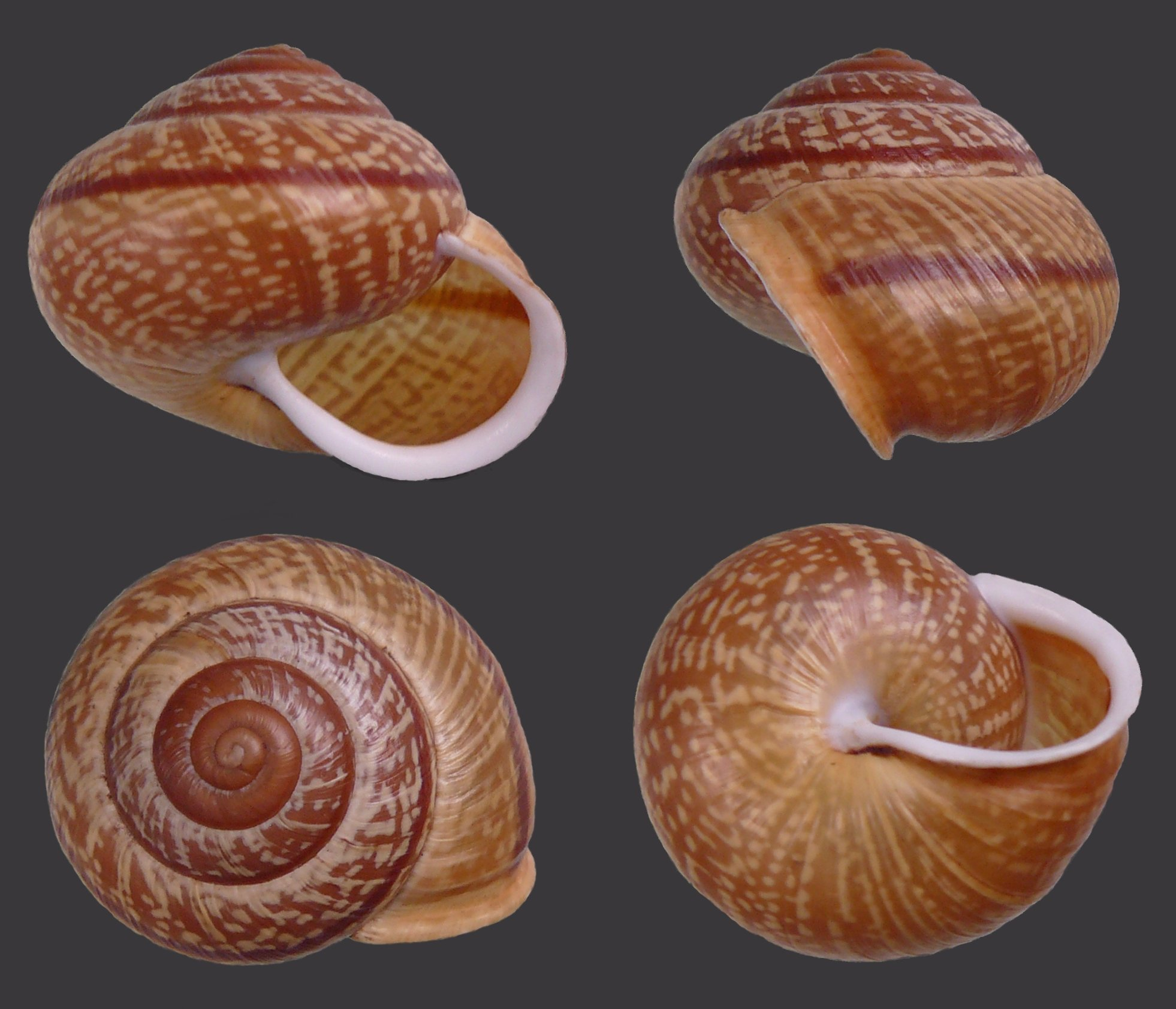
Four views of a shell of the land snail Arianta arbustorum

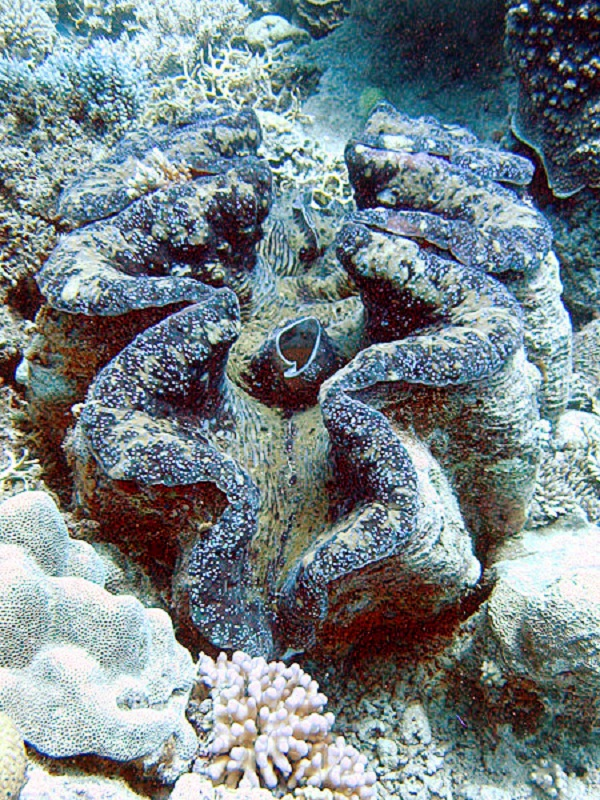
The giant clam (Tridacna gigas) is the largest extant species of bivalve. The mantle is visible between the open valves

A mollusc shell is formed, repaired and maintained by a part of the anatomy called the mantle. Any injuries to or abnormal conditions of the mantle are usually reflected in the shape and form and even color of the shell. When the animal encounters harsh conditions that limit its food supply, or otherwise cause it to become dormant for a while, the mantle often ceases to produce the shell substance. When conditions improve again and the mantle resumes its task, a "growth line" is produced.

The mantle edge secretes a shell which has two components. The organic constituent is mainly made up of polysaccharides and glycoproteins; its composition may vary widely: some molluscs employ a wide range of chitin-control genes to create their matrix, whereas others express just one, suggesting that the role of chitin in the shell framework is highly variable; it may even be absent in monoplacophora. This organic framework controls the formation of calcium carbonate crystals (never phosphate, with the questionable exception of Cobcrephora), and dictates when and where crystals start and stop growing, and how fast they expand; it even controls the polymorph of the crystal deposited, controlling positioning and elongation of crystals and preventing their growth where appropriate.

The shell formation requires certain biological machinery. The shell is deposited within a small compartment, the extrapallial space, which is sealed from the environment by the periostracum, a leathery outer layer around the rim of the shell, where growth occurs. This caps off the extrapallial space, which is bounded on its other surfaces by the existing shell and the mantle. The periostracum acts as a framework from which the outer layer of carbonate can be suspended, but also, in sealing the compartment, allows the accumulation of ions in concentrations sufficient for crystallization to occur. The accumulation of ions is driven by ion pumps packed within the calcifying epithelium. Calcium ions are obtained from the organism's environment through the gills, gut and epithelium, transported by the haemolymph ("blood") to the calcifying epithelium, and stored as granules within or in-between cells ready to be dissolved and pumped into the extrapallial space when they are required. The organic matrix forms the scaffold that directs crystallization, and the deposition and rate of crystals is also controlled by hormones produced by the mollusc. Because the extrapallial space is supersaturated, the matrix could be thought of as impeding, rather than encouraging, carbonate deposition; although it does act as a nucleating point for the crystals and controls their shape, orientation and polymorph, it also terminates their growth once they reach the necessary size. Nucleation is endoepithelial in Neopilina and Nautilus, but exoepithelial in the bivalves and gastropods.

The formation of the shell involves a number of genes and transcription factors. On the whole, the transcription factors and signalling genes are deeply conserved, but the proteins in the secretome are highly derived and rapidly evolving. engrailed serves to demark the edge of the shell field; dpp controls the shape of the shell, and Hox1 and Hox4 have been implicated in the onset of mineralization. In gastropod embryos, Hox1 is expressed where the shell is being accreted; however no association has been observed between Hox genes and cephalopod shell formation. Perlucin increases the rate at which calcium carbonate precipitates to form a shell when in saturated seawater; this protein is from the same group of proteins (C-type lectins) as those responsible for the formation of eggshell and pancreatic stone crystals, but the role of C-type lectins in mineralization is unclear. Perlucin operates in association with Perlustrin, a smaller relative of lustrin A, a protein responsible for the elasticity of organic layers that makes nacre so resistant to cracking. Lustrin A bears remarkable structural similarity to the proteins involved in mineralization in diatoms – even though diatoms use silica, not calcite, to form their tests.

=== Development ===
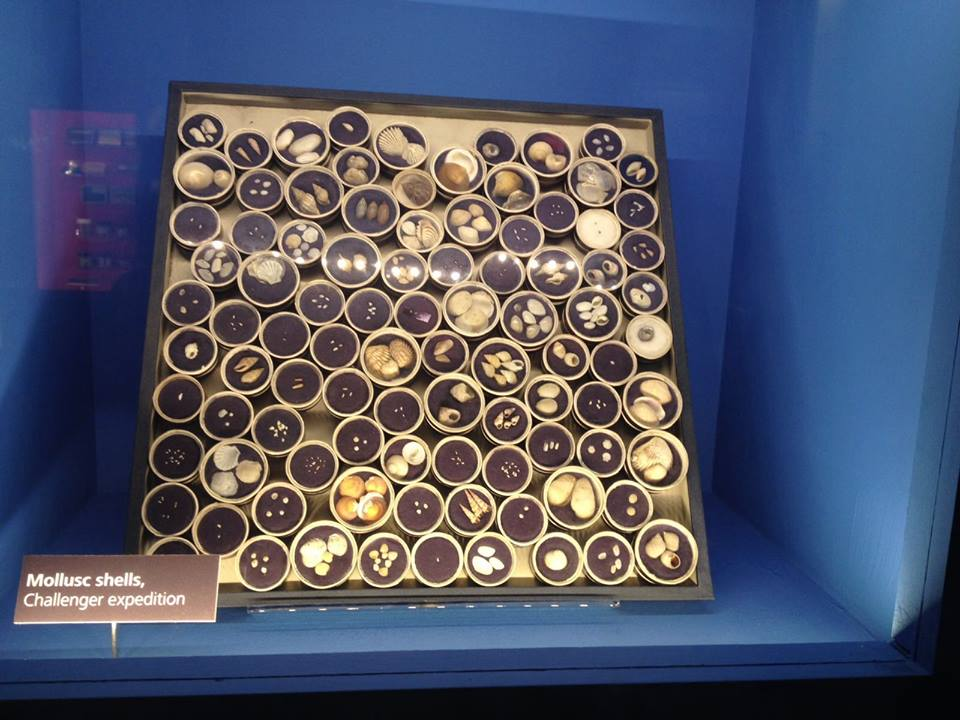
Mollusc shells in Manchester Museum

The shell-secreting area is differentiated very early in embryonic development. An area of the ectoderm thickens, then invaginates to become a "shell gland". The shape of this gland is tied to the form of the adult shell; in gastropods, it is a simple pit, whereas in bivalves, it forms a groove which will eventually become the hinge line between the two shells, where they are connected by a ligament. The gland subsequently evaginates in molluscs that produce an external shell. Whilst invaginated, a periostracum - which will form a scaffold for the developing shell - is formed around the opening of the invagination, allowing the deposition of the shell when the gland is everted. A wide range of enzymes are expressed during the formation of the shell, including carbonic anhydrase, alkaline phosphatase, and DOPA-oxidase (tyrosinase)/peroxidase.

The form of the molluscan shell is constrained by the organism's ecology. In molluscs whose ecology changes from the larval to adult form, the morphology of the shell also undergoes a pronounced modification at metamorphosis. The larval shell may have a completely different mineralogy to the adult conch, perhaps formed from amorphous calcite as opposed to an aragonite adult conch.

In those shelled molluscs that have indeterminate growth, the shell grows steadily over the lifetime of the mollusc by the addition of calcium carbonate to the leading edge or opening. Thus the shell gradually becomes longer and wider, in an increasing spiral shape, to better accommodate the growing animal inside. The shell thickens as it grows, so that it stays proportionately strong for its size.

=== Secondary loss ===
The loss of a shell in the adult form of some gastropods is achieved by the discarding of the larval shell; in other gastropods and in cephalopods, the shell is lost or demineralized by the resorption of its carbonate component by the mantle tissue.

=== Shell proteins ===
Hundreds of soluble and insoluble proteins control shell formation. They are secreted into the extrapallial space by the mantle, which also secretes the glycoproteins, proteoglycans, polysaccharides and chitin that make up the organic shell matrix. Insoluble proteins tend to be thought of as playing a more important/major role in crystallization control. The organic matrix of shells tends to consist of β-chitin and silk fibroin. Perlucin encourages carbonate deposition, and is found at the interface of the chitinous and aragonitic layer in some shells. An acidic shell matrix appears to be essential to shell formation, in the cephalopods at least; the matrix in the non-mineralized squid gladius is basic.

In oysters and potentially most molluscs, the nacreous layer has an organic framework of the protein MSI60, which has a structure a little like spider silk and forms sheets; the prismatic layer uses MSI31 to construct its framework. This too forms beta-pleated sheets. Since acidic amino acids, such as aspartic acid and glutamic acid, are important mediators of biomineralization, shell proteins tend to be rich in these amino acids. Aspartic acid, which can make up up to 50% of shell framework proteins, is most abundant in calcitic layers, and also heavily present in aragonitic layers. Proteins with high proportions of glutamic acid are usually associated with amorphous calcium carbonate.

The soluble component of the shell matrix acts to inhibit crystallization when in its soluble form, but when it attaches to an insoluble substrate, it permits the nucleation of crystals. By switching from a dissolved to an attached form and back again, the proteins can produce bursts of growth, producing the brick-wall structure of the shell.

It may be possible to use shell protein information in gastropod systematics, e.g. to discriminate species level diversity, but methods need further development.

=== Chemistry ===
The formation of a shell in molluscs appears to be related to the secretion of ammonia, which originates from urea. The presence of an ammonium ion raises the pH of the extrapallial fluid, favouring the deposition of calcium carbonate. This mechanism has been proposed not only for molluscs, but also for other unrelated mineralizing lineages.

== Structure ==
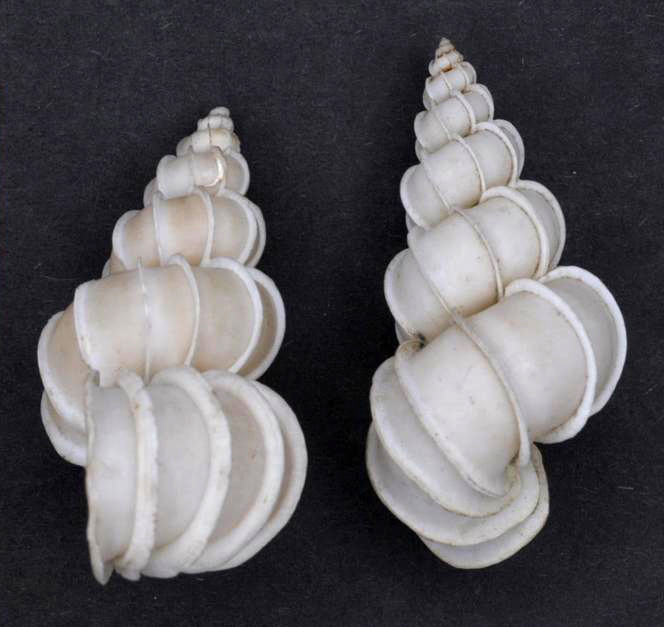
Precious Wentletrap: the spiral shell of Epitonium scalare sea snail.

The calcium carbonate layers in a shell are generally of two types: an outer, chalk-like prismatic layer and an inner pearly, lamellar or nacreous layer. The layers usually incorporate a substance called conchiolin, often in order to help bind the calcium carbonate crystals together. Conchiolin is composed largely of quinone-tanned proteins.

The periostracum and prismatic layer are secreted by a marginal band of cells, so that the shell grows at its outer edge. Conversely, the nacreous layer is derived from the main surface of the mantle.

Some shells contain pigments which are incorporated into the structure. This is what accounts for the striking colors and patterns that can be seen in some species of seashells, and the shells of some tropical land snails. These shell pigments sometimes include compounds such as pyrroles and porphyrins.

Shells are almost always composed of polymorphs of calcium carbonate - either calcite or aragonite. In many cases, such as the shells of many of the marine gastropods, different layers of the shell are composed of calcite and aragonite. In a few species which dwell near hydrothermal vents, iron sulfide is used to construct the shell. Phosphate is never utilised by molluscs, with the exception of Cobcrephora, whose molluscan affinity is uncertain.

Shells are composite materials of calcium carbonate (found either as calcite or aragonite) and organic macromolecules (mainly proteins and polysaccharides). Shells can have numerous ultrastructural motifs, the most common being crossed-lamellar (aragonite), prismatic (aragonite or calcite), homogeneous (aragonite), foliated (aragonite) and nacre (aragonite). Although not the most common, nacre is the most studied type of layer.

=== Size ===
In most shelled molluscs, the shell is large enough for all of the soft parts to be retracted inside when necessary, for protection from predation or from desiccation. However, there are many species of gastropod mollusc in which the shell is somewhat reduced or considerably reduced, such that it offers some degree of protection only to the visceral mass, but is not large enough to allow the retraction of the other soft parts. This is particularly common in the opisthobranchs and in some of the pulmonates, for example in the semi-slugs.

Some gastropods have no shell at all, or only an internal shell or internal calcareous granules, and these species are often known as slugs. Semi-slugs are pulmonate slugs with a greatly reduced external shell which is in some cases partly covered by the mantle.

=== Shape ===
The shape of the molluscan shell is controlled both by transcription factors (such as engrailed and decapentaplegic) and by developmental rate. The simplification of a shell form is thought to be relatively easily evolved, and many gastropod lineages have independently lost the complex coiled shape. However, re-gaining the coiling requires many morphological modifications and is much rarer. Despite this, it can still be accomplished; it is known from one lineage that was uncoiled for at least 20 million years, before modifying its developmental timing to restore the coiled morphology.

In bivalves at least, the shape does change through growth, but the pattern of growth is constant. At each point around the aperture of the shell, the rate of growth remains constant. This results in different areas growing at different rates, and thus a coiling of the shell and a change in its shape - its convexity, and the shape of the opening - in a predictable and consistent fashion.

The shape of the shell has an environmental as well as a genetic component; clones of gastropods can exert different shell morphologies. Indeed, intra-species variation can be many times larger than inter-species variation.

A number of terms are used to describe molluscan shell shape; in the univalved molluscs, endogastric shells coil backwards (away from the head), whereas exogastric shells coil forwards; the equivalent terms in bivalved molluscs are opisthogyrate and prosogyrate respectively.

=== Nacre ===
Nacre, commonly known as mother of pearl, forms the inner layer of the shell structure in some groups of gastropod and bivalve molluscs, mostly in the more ancient families such as top snails (Trochidae), and pearl oysters (Pteriidae). Like the other calcareous layers of the shell, the nacre is created by the epithelial cells (formed by the germ layer ectoderm) of the mantle tissue. However, nacre does not seem to represent a modification of other shell types, as it uses a distinct set of proteins.

== Evolution ==
The fossil record shows that all molluscan classes evolved some 500 million years ago from a shelled ancestor looking something like a modern monoplacophoran, and that modifications of the shell form ultimately led to the formation of new classes and lifestyles. However, a growing body of molecular and biological data indicate that at least certain shell features have evolved many times, independently. The nacreous layer of shells is a complex structure, but rather than being difficult to evolve, it has in fact arisen many times convergently. The genes used to control its formation vary greatly between taxa: under 10% of the (non-housekeeping) genes expressed in the shells that produce gastropod nacre are also found in the equivalent shells of bivalves: and most of these shared genes are also found in mineralizing organs in the deuterostome lineage. The independent origins of this trait are further supported by crystallographic differences between clades: the orientation of the axes of the deposited aragonite 'bricks' that make up the nacreous layer is different in each of the monoplacophora, gastropods and bivalves.

Mollusc shells (especially those formed by marine species) are very durable and outlast the otherwise soft-bodied animals that produce them by a very long time (sometimes thousands of years even without being fossilized). Most shells of marine molluscs fossilize rather easily, and fossil mollusc shells date all the way back to the Cambrian period. Large amounts of shell sometimes forms sediment, and over a geological time span can become compressed into limestone deposits.

Most of the fossil record of molluscs consists of their shells, since the shell is often the only mineralised part of a mollusc (however also see Aptychus and operculum). The shells are usually preserved as calcium carbonate – usually any aragonite is pseudomorphed with calcite. Aragonite can be protected from recrystalization if water is kept away by carbonaceous material, but this did not accumulate in sufficient quantity until the Carboniferous; consequently aragonite older than the Carboniferous is practically unknown: but the original crystal structure can sometimes be deduced in fortunate circumstances, such as if an alga closely encrusts the surface of a shell, or if a phosphatic mould quickly forms during diagenesis.

The shell-less aplacophora have a chitinous cuticle that has been likened to the shell framework; it has been suggested that tanning of this cuticle, in conjunction with the expression of additional proteins, could have set the evolutionary stage for the secretion of a calcareous shell in an aplacophoran-like ancestral mollusc.

The molluscan shell has been internalized in a number of lineages, including the coleoid cephalopods and many gastropod lineages. Detorsion of gastropods results in an internal shell, and can be triggered by relatively minor developmental modifications such as those induced by exposure to high platinum concentrations.

== Pattern formation ==
The pattern formation processes in mollusc shells have been modeled successfully using one-dimensional reaction–diffusion systems, in particular the Gierer-Meinhardt system which leans heavily on the Turing model.

== Varieties ==
=== Monoplacophora ===
The nacreous layer of monoplacophoran shells appears to have undergone some modification. Whilst normal nacre, and indeed part of the nacreous layer of one monoplacophoran species (Veleropilina zografi), consists of "brick-like" crystals of aragonite, in monoplacophora these bricks are more like layered sheets. The c-axis is perpendicular to the shell wall, and the a-axis parallel to the growth direction. This foliated aragonite is presumed to have evolved from the nacreous layer, with which it has historically been confused, but represents a novelty within the molluscs.

=== Chitons ===
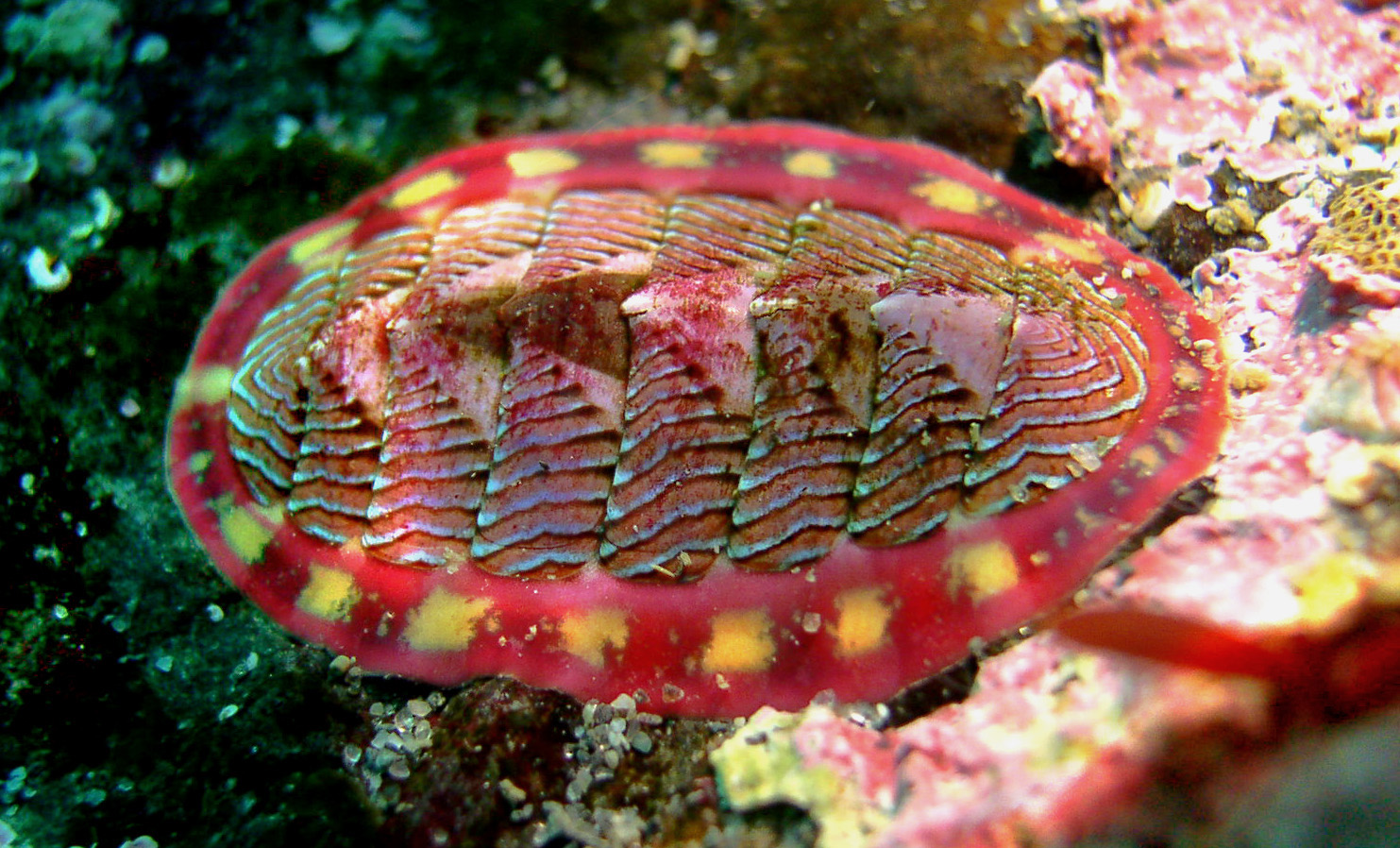
The chiton Tonicella lineata, anterior end towards the right

Shells of chitons are made up of eight overlapping calcareous valves, surrounded by a girdle.

=== Gastropods ===
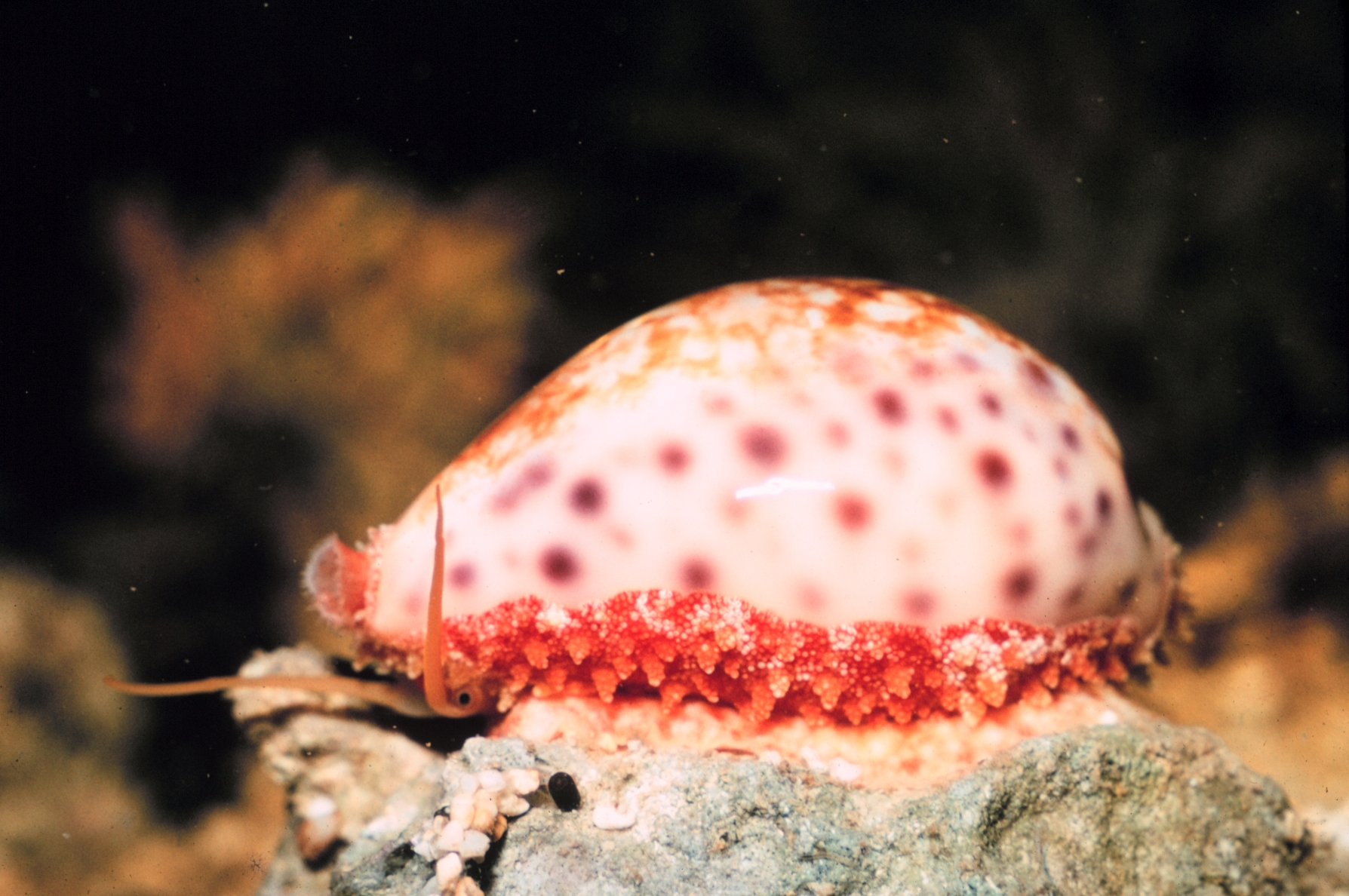
The marine gastropod Cypraea chinensis, the Chinese cowry, showing partially extended mantle

In some marine genera, during the course of normal growth the animal undergoes periodic resting stages where the shell does not increase in overall size, but a greatly thickened and strengthened lip is produced instead. When these structures are formed repeatedly with normal growth between the stages, evidence of this pattern of growth is visible on the outside of the shell, and these unusual thickened vertical areas are called varices, singular "varix". Varices are typical in some marine gastropod families, including the Bursidae, Muricidae, and Ranellidae.

Finally, gastropods with a determinate growth pattern may create a single and terminal lip structure when approaching maturity, after which growth ceases. These include the cowries (Cypraeidae) and helmet shells (Cassidae), both with in-turned lips, the true conchs (Strombidae) that develop flaring lips, and many land snails that develop tooth structures or constricted apertures upon reaching full size.

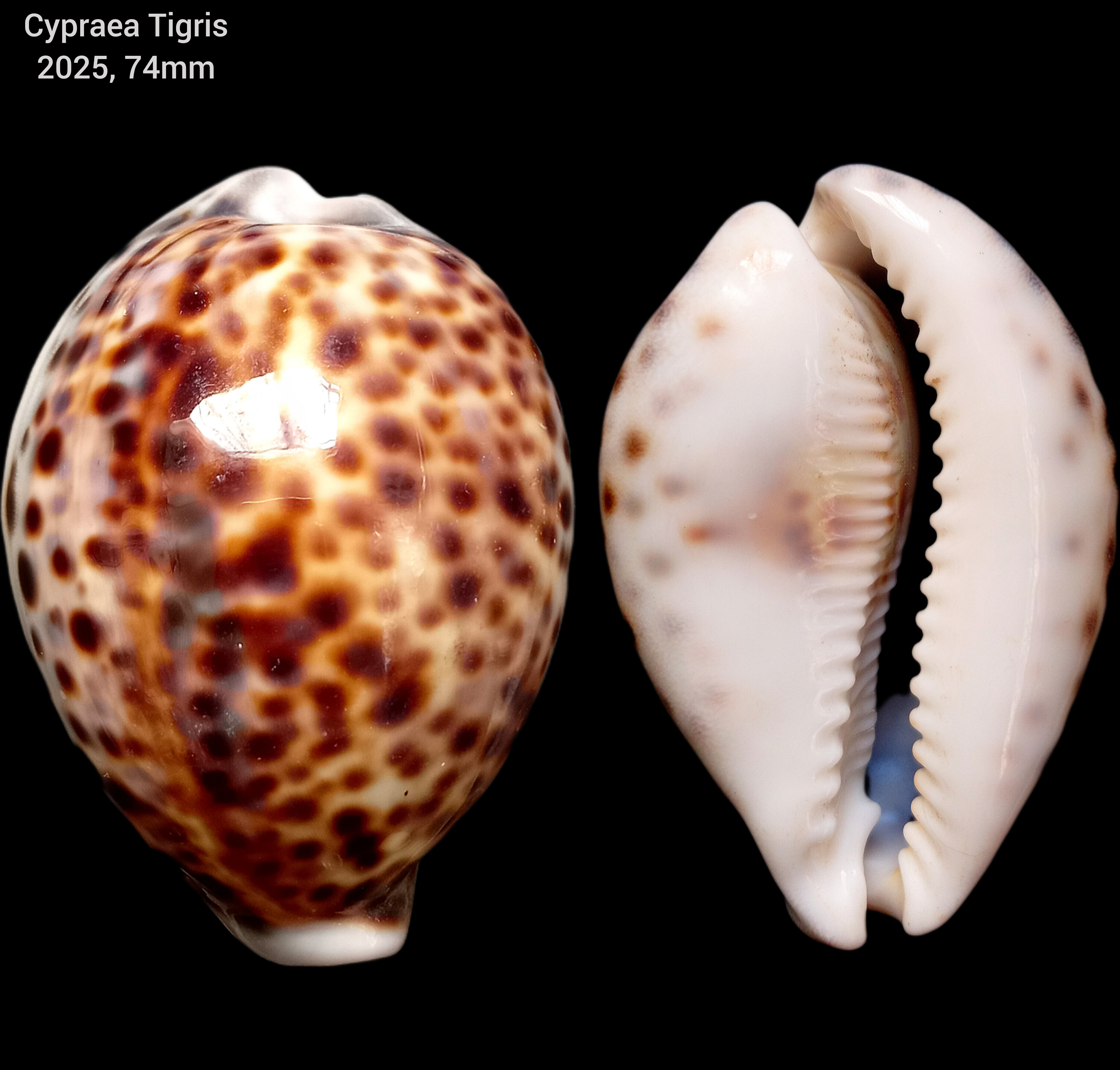
Cypraea Tigris

=== Cephalopods ===
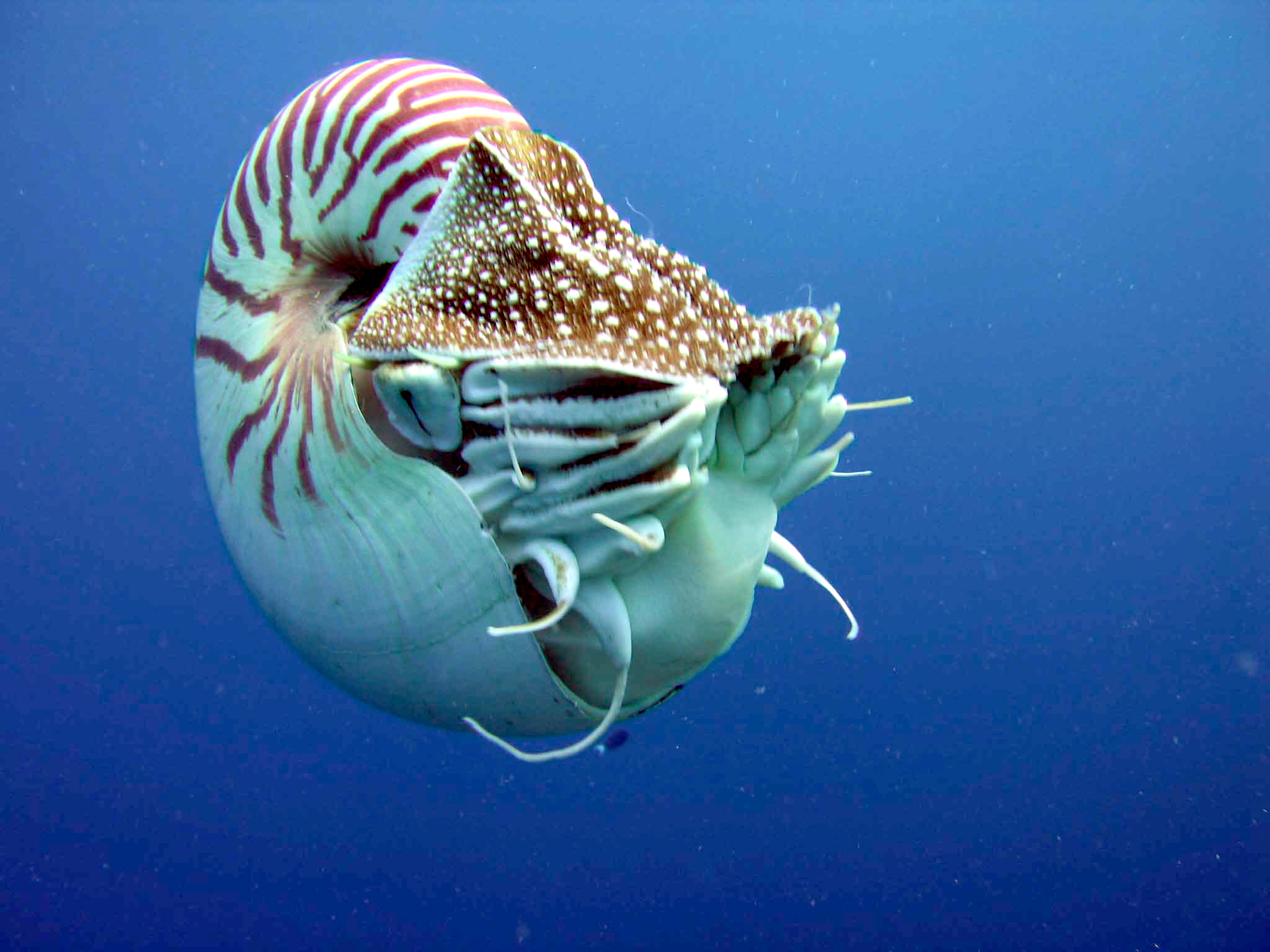
Nautilus belauensis is one of only 6 extant cephalopod species which have an external shell

Nautiluses are the only extant cephalopods which have an external shell. Extinct cephalopods with external shells include other nautiloids and the subclass Ammonoidea. Cuttlefish, squid, spirula, vampire squid, and cirrate octopuses have small internal shells. Female paper nautilus (Argonauta) secrete a specialised paper-thin eggcase in which they partially reside, and this is popularly regarded as a "shell", although it is not attached to the body of the animal.

=== Bivalves ===
The shell of the Bivalvia is composed of two parts, two valves which are hinged together and joined by a ligament.

=== Scaphopods ===
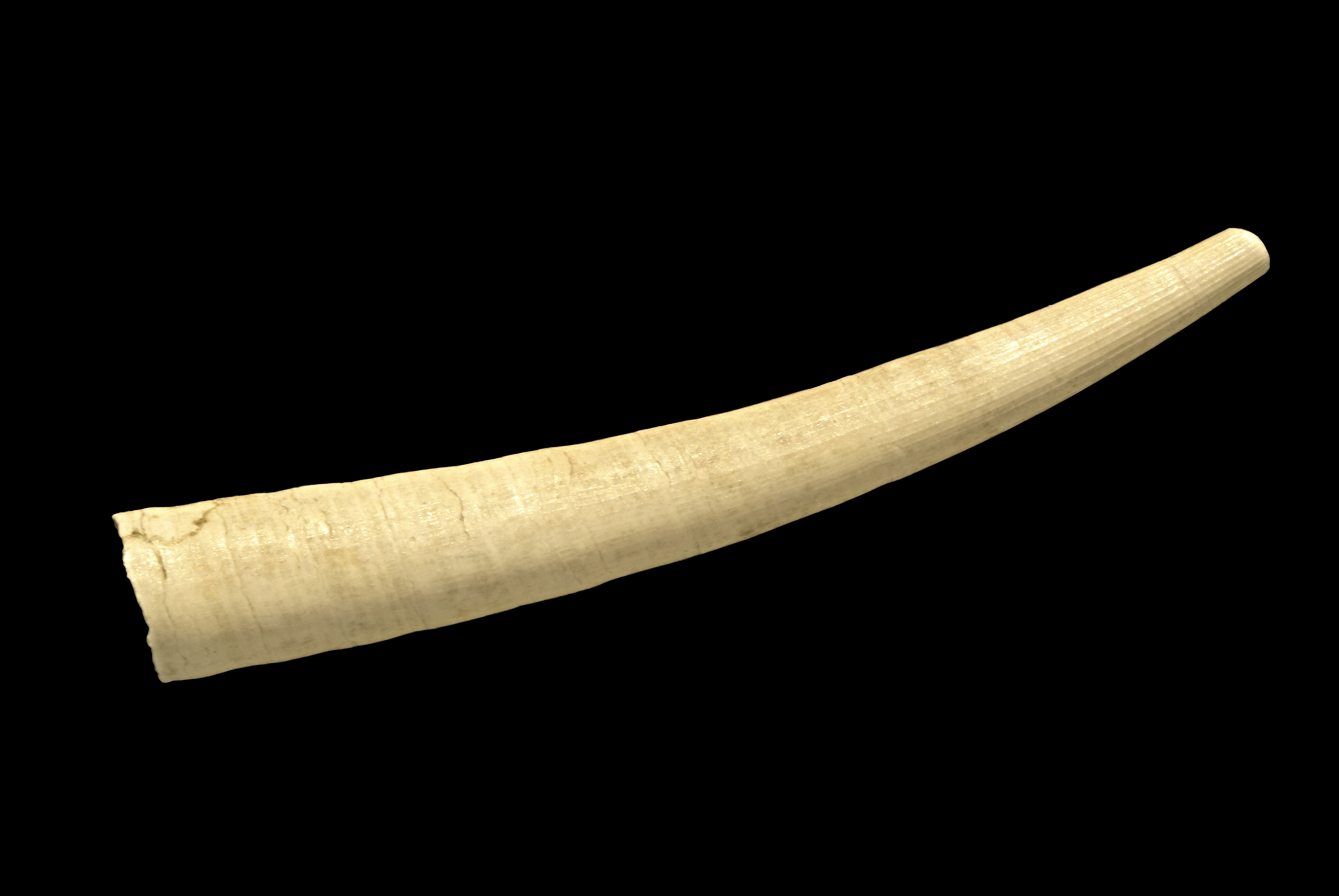
Tusk shell of Antalis vulgaris.

The shell of many of the scaphopods ("tusk shells") resembles a miniature elephant's tusk in overall shape, except that it is hollow, and is open at both ends.

== Damage to shells in collections ==
As a structure made primarily of calcium carbonate, mollusc shells are vulnerable to attack by acidic fumes. This can become a problem when shells are in storage or on display and are in the proximity of non-archival materials; this condition is known as Byne's disease or Bynesian decay.

== See also ==
- Articles on sub-groups within mollusc shells:
  - Gastropod shell
  - Seashell
- The Bailey-Matthews Shell Museum
- Seashell surface, a mathematical construct
- Sculpture (mollusc)
- Brachiopod shell protein, papers by Margaret Jope
