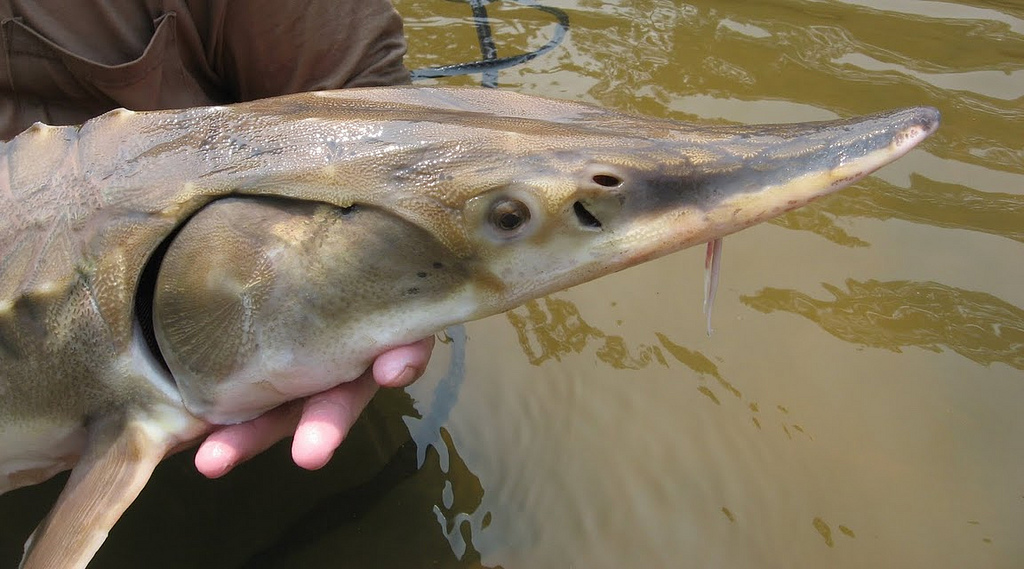
- Head of a Gulf sturgeon

Conservation status
- Endangered (IUCN 3.1)

- Threatened (ESA)

Scientific classification
- Kingdom: Animalia
- Phylum: Chordata
- Class: Actinopterygii
- Order: Acipenseriformes
- Family: Acipenseridae
- Genus: Acipenser
- Species: A. desotoi

Binomial name
- Acipenser desotoi Vladykov, 1955

Synonyms
- Acipenser oxyrinchus desotoi

= Gulf sturgeon =

Species of fish

The Gulf sturgeon (Acipenser desotoi) is a species of sturgeon endemic to the southeastern United States. An anadromous fish, it inhabits the Gulf of Mexico and spawns in a number of rivers that drain into it, from southern Florida west to eastern Louisiana. It has one of the southernmost distributions of all sturgeon, which otherwise tend to inhabit cooler habitats in more northern latitudes.

The Gulf sturgeon is listed as threatened under the United States Endangered Species Act, having been listed in 1991. Critical habitat, reflecting the range of the subspecies deemed essential for its continued survival, has been designated (see map). The historical range is thought to have been from the Suwannee River on the western coast of Florida to the Mississippi River, and marine waters of the central and eastern portions of the Gulf of Mexico. Three sturgeon species in genus Scaphirhynchus share river territory with the Gulf sturgeon; none of the other sturgeon species is anadromous.

== Taxonomy ==
The Gulf sturgeon was first recognized as a distinct taxon in 1955, being named after the Spanish explorer Hernando de Soto, who explored the region inhabited by this species during the 16th century. It was long treated as a subspecies of the closely related Atlantic sturgeon (A. oxyrhynchus). However, a 2025 study found the two subspecies to have sufficient—although recent—genetic divergence from one another to qualify as distinct species, and they are also recognized as such by Eschmeyer's Catalog of Fishes. The two species are allopatric and separated by peninsular Florida, with the Atlantic sturgeon breeding in Atlantic Ocean-draining rivers while the Gulf sturgeon breeds in rivers that drain into the Gulf of Mexico. They are thought to have diverged from one another during the Pleistocene.

== Physical appearance ==
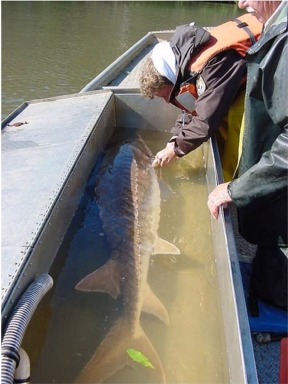
On side

Visually, Gulf sturgeon are almost impossible to differentiate from Atlantic sturgeon, as the most significant morphological difference is the spleen length, which is internal. Gulf sturgeon have a spleen length averaging 12.3% of their fork length, while Atlantic sturgeon have a spleen length averaging 5.7% of their fork length. Lesser morphological differences include relative head length, shape of dorsal scutes, and pectoral fin length. Genetic differences between the subspecies have been studied, and tend to indicate reproductive isolation occurred in the Pleistocene period. Behavioral differences are more clear, especially the dietary habits. Adult Gulf sturgeon eat primarily, or possibly only, during the winter, when they are in marine or brackish water, and eat little to nothing during the remainder of the year when they are in rivers. Their weights vary in accordance with this eating pattern, with significant weight gains in the winter and smaller weight losses in the summer. Because their diet consists of mollusks that can cause paralytic shellfish poisoning (PSP), in addition to other bottom-dwelling organisms such as grass shrimp, marine worms, isopods, and amphipods, their unique feeding pattern possibly reflects an adaptation to prevent PSP that coincides with higher rates of algal blooms in summer.

== Diet ==
The primary foods of sturgeon while in freshwater areas include soft-bodied annelids, arthropods, aquatic insects, and globular mollusks. Adults that have emigrated from estuaries and into the sea will usually feed on epibenthic and hyperbenthic amphipods, grass shrimp, isopods, and worms. Most adult sturgeon will also feed on detritus and biofilm.

== Life cycle ==
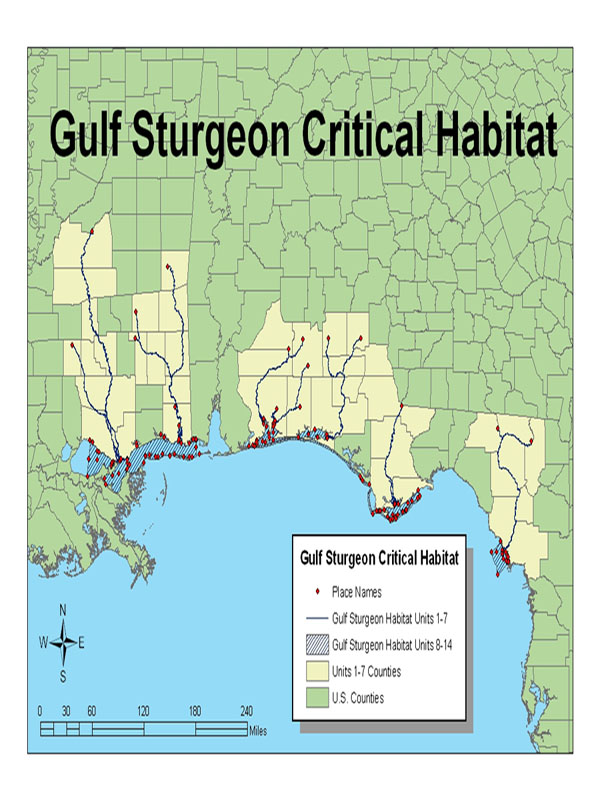
Critical habitat map for the Gulf sturgeon, 2003

=== Early life ===
Juvenile Gulf sturgeon remain in the spawning river until roughly two years of age, eating there. They are primarily adapted for benthic foraging. However, food in the benthic zone is scarce, so many adapt to drift feeding, in which they have holding positions in the water column and wait for food. Thereafter, they join the adults in their anadromous migrations and eating habits. The upriver migration normally occurs between February and April, as river temperatures rise to 16 to 23 °C (61 to 73 °F). Downriver migration normally begins in late September or October when water temperatures drop to 23 °C (73 °F). Males reach sexual maturity between seven and 12 years of age, females between eight and 17 years of age. Spawning almost always occurs in the natal river, generally over a hard bottom just downstream of a spring on the river bottom feeding groundwater into the river. After spawning, the adults and older juveniles collect in regions of cooler, deeper, slower-flowing water, generally downstream of springs.

=== Migration ===
Sturgeons will migrate upriver to spawn. Sturgeons from the Gulf of Mexico will naturally exhibit spawning migration in the spring. Peak numbers have been observed in March and April, which is when the fish will migrate into the Suwannee River in Florida. Sturgeon will migrate downstream for twelve days, peaking within the first six days. Gulf sturgeons only need to move a short distance to reach rearing areas. Early sturgeon migrants tend to be nocturnal while later migrants are diurnal. During summer months, sturgeon will remain in localized bottom areas of the rivers. In the late fall, the sturgeon migrate out of spawning rivers and into the Gulf of Mexico.

Timing and the unusual migratory behavior of sturgeon is a result of temporal water temperature changes. Studies have also shown that amongst sturgeon in Gulf of Mexico and Suwannee River in Florida, fish gained 20% of their body weight while in Gulf of Mexico and lost 12% of their body weight during their time in the river.

=== Spawning ===
The maximum level of survival for eggs, embryos, and larvae is at 15 to 20 °C (59 to 68 °F). Studies have shown that high mortalities are seen at temperatures of 25 °C (77 °F) or higher. In order for spawning to occur, water temperature should be above 17 °C (63 °F). Spawning normally lasts between nine and twenty-three days, but can continue past this as long as the water temperature remains below 22 °C (72 °F). Due to sturgeons' predilection for cooler waters, when water temperatures rise too high, sturgeon will try to find cool spring waters which serve as thermal refuges until temperatures drop again.

Free sturgeon embryos (the first interval of sturgeon after hatching) hide under rocks and do not migrate. They are found in the freshwater spawning areas. Larvae and some juveniles start to migrate slowly for about five months downstream. This leads to a wide dispersal of the fish. Typically, the entire freshwater reach of the river downstream from the actual spawning site is so filled with larva-juvenile individuals that it is considered to be a nursery habitat.

Sturgeon populations will use the same spawning reefs from year to year. Habitat factors that can help determine spawning sites include the presence of gravel substrate, presence of eddy fields, slightly basic pH, and a range in calcium ion content. Eggs are usually deposited in a small area and scatter very little. It is not until larvae and juveniles start to migrate that the fish disperse widely.

==== Body color ====
Some evidence has shown that developmental body color is related to migration style. Free embryos are light and are non-migratory, while migratory larvae and adults are dark. This is found to be consistent among many Acipenser species. The reason for this is unclear, but it may be adaptive to migration behavior and camouflage.

== Jumping ==
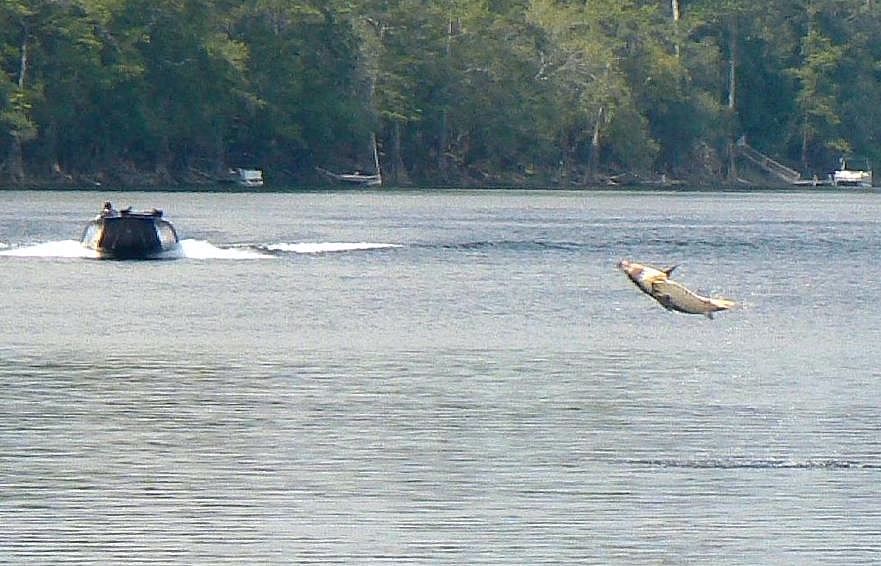
Gulf sturgeon jumping on the Suwannee River, Florida. Large jumping sturgeons can inflict serious injuries to humans who get in the way.

All species of sturgeon leap out of the water at times. The Gulf sturgeon tends to jump during July and August, and again early during the offshore feeding period. They are thought to jump to communicate and maintain group cohesion. Due to their heavy body armor, large leaping sturgeon can inflict serious injuries to humans who are in the way. On July 2, 2015, a leaping sturgeon on the Suwannee River in Florida struck and killed a 5-year-old girl.

== Threats ==
Predators of the sturgeon, other than humans, are unknown, but thought to have limited impact upon the species. Parasites include the fish louse Argulus stizostehi, nematodes, trematodes, and leeches. No detrimental impacts from these parasites have been observed. The species also serves as host to the glochidia (larvae) of three freshwater mussel species. Overfishing and dam construction probably contributed to the historical decline in populations.
