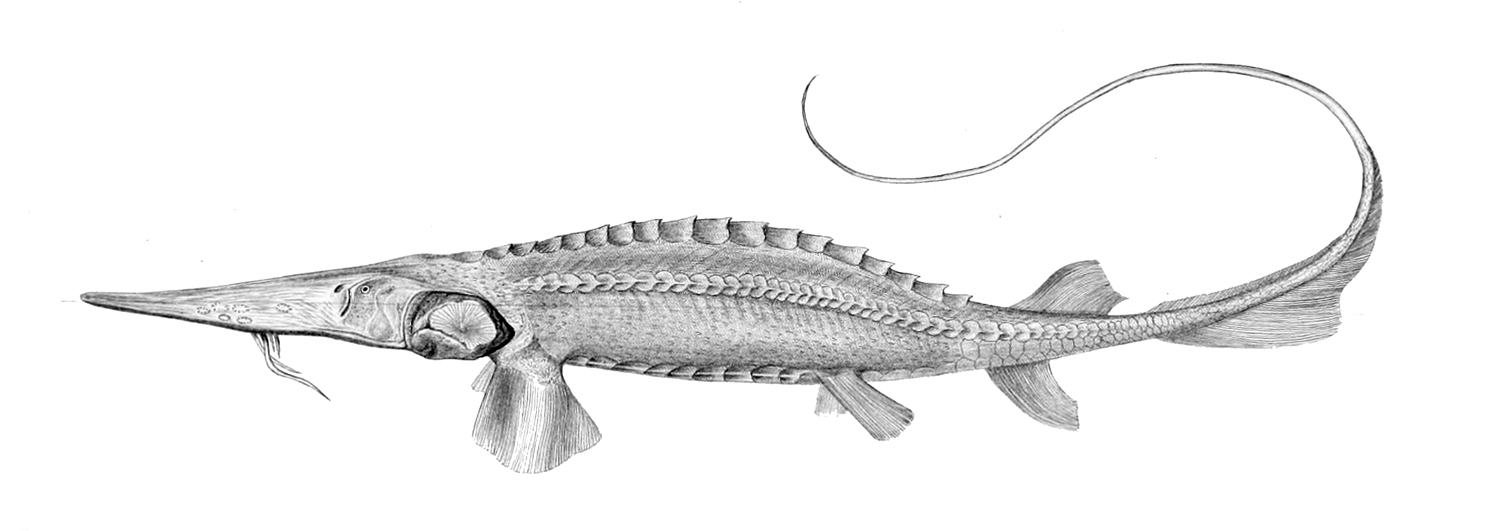
- Pseudoscaphirhynchus fedtschenkoi

Scientific classification
- Kingdom: Animalia
- Phylum: Chordata
- Class: Actinopterygii
- Order: Acipenseriformes
- Family: Acipenseridae
- Genus: Pseudoscaphirhynchus; A. M. Nikolskii, 1900

Species
- Pseudoscaphirhynchus fedtschenkoi; Pseudoscaphirhynchus hermanni; Pseudoscaphirhynchus kaufmanni
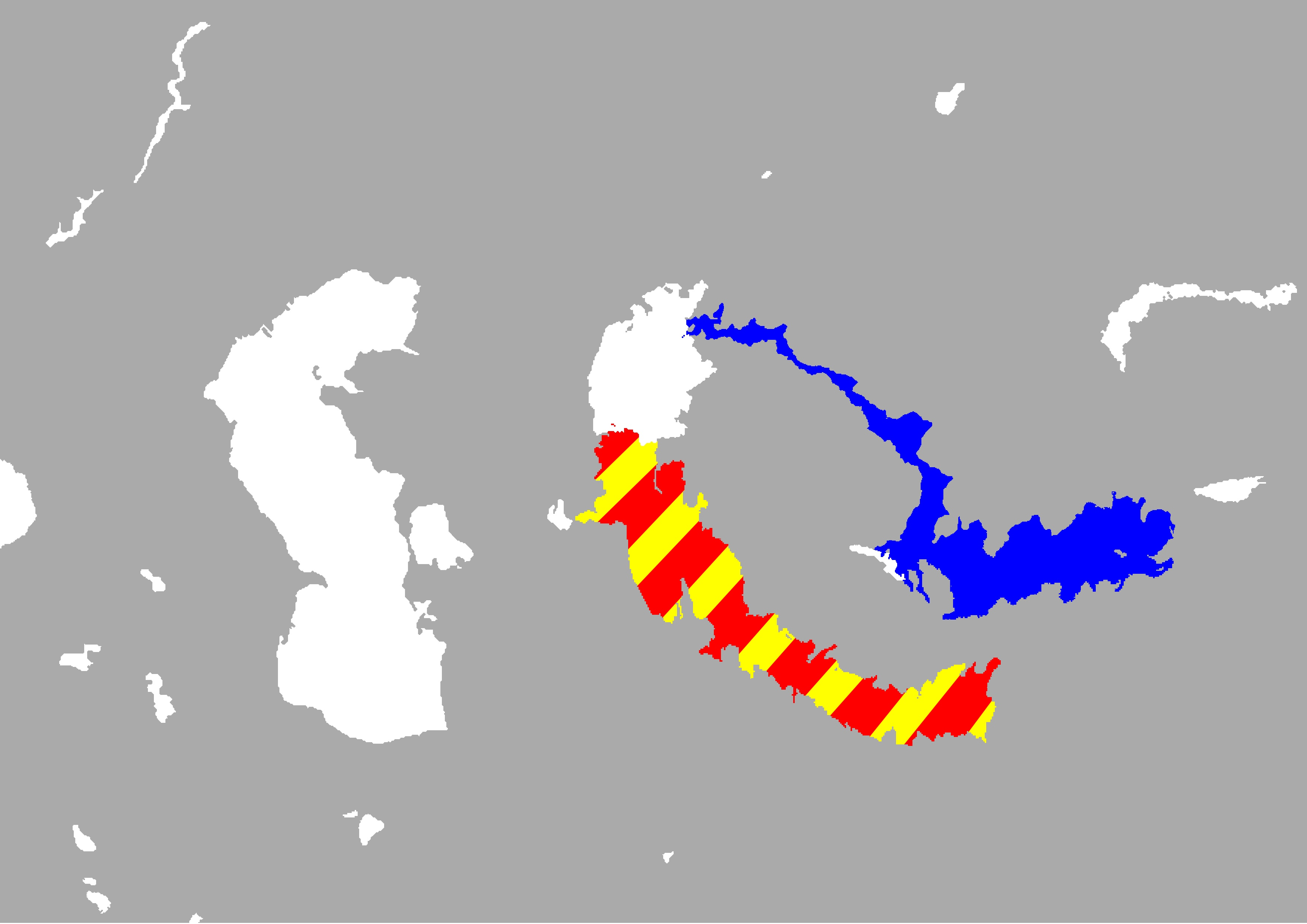
- Blue: Pseudoscaphirhynchus fedtschenkoi Red: Pseudoscaphirhynchus hermanni Yellow: Pseudoscaphirhynchus kaufmanni (overlapping range)

Synonyms
- Kessleria Boghdanov 1882 non Nowicki 1864 non Lichtenstein 1886; Pseudoscaphirhynchus (Hemiscaphirhynchus) Berg 1911; Hemiscaphirhynchus (Berg 1911)

= Pseudoscaphirhynchus =

Genus of fishes

Pseudoscaphirhynchus is a genus of relatively small, highly threatened sturgeons that are restricted to the Aral Sea system (although extirpated from the Aral Sea itself), including the Amu Darya and Syr Darya river basins, in Central Asia.

P. fedtschenkoi is restricted to Syr Darya, but has not been seen in decades and it is possibly extinct. The two other species in the genus are restricted to Amu Darya: P. hermanni survives in very low numbers and P. kaufmanni in low numbers, with both being rated as Critically Endangered by the IUCN.

Compared to other sturgeons, Pseudoscaphirhynchus are small. The largest species, P. kaufmanni, reaches up to 75 cm (30 in) in total length (excluding tail filament), while the smallest, P. hermanni, only reaches 27.5 cm (10.8 in), making it the smallest member of the sturgeon family. P. kaufmanni has a long thin tail filament, P. hermanni lacks it, and it can be long or short in P. fedtschenkoi. They have a relatively long, broad and flattened snout, somewhat like Scaphirhynchus of North America. Little is known about the behavior of Pseudoscaphirhynchus, but they mainly feed on the bottom on small fish and aquatic insect larvae.

== Taxonomy and species ==
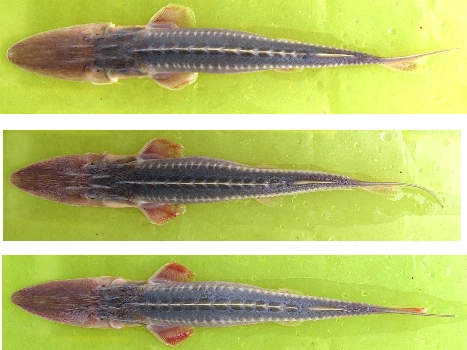
Three different P. hermanni seen from above

There are currently three recognized species in this genus:

- Pseudoscaphirhynchus fedtschenkoi (Kessler, 1872) (Syr Darya sturgeon)
- Pseudoscaphirhynchus hermanni (Kessler, 1877) (dwarf sturgeon, small Amu Darya sturgeon)
- Pseudoscaphirhynchus kaufmanni (Kessler, 1877) (Amu Darya sturgeon)

Historically, the two species in the Amu Darya River were known to hybridize. Unusually, P. fedtschenkoi occurs (or occurred) in three morphs that can be separated by the length of their snout and tail filament, and P. kaufmanni occurs in two morphs that can be separated by their total size and colour.

Although Pseudoscaphirhynchus and Scaphirhynchus traditionally are placed together in the subfamily Scaphirhynchinae based on their similar morphology, several genetic and karyotypic studies have shown that this grouping is polyphyletic.
