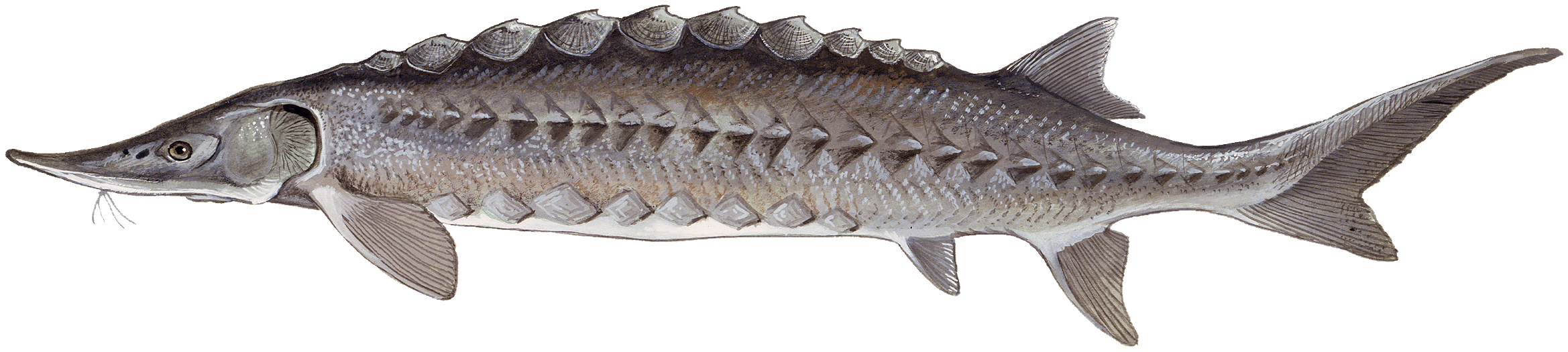
- Atlantic sturgeon (Acipenser oxyrinchus)

Scientific classification
- Kingdom: Animalia
- Phylum: Chordata
- Class: Actinopterygii
- Order: Acipenseriformes
- Family: Acipenseridae; Bonaparte, 1831

Genera
- Acipenser; Sinosturio; Huso; Scaphirhynchus; Pseudoscaphirhynchus; Fossil genera: †Boreiosturion; †Protoscaphirhynchus; †Engdahlichthys; †Anchiacipenser; †Priscosturion

= Sturgeon =

Sturgeon Temporal range: Cenomanian–Recent

Ray-finned fish

Sturgeon are the 27 species of fish belonging to the family Acipenseridae. The earliest sturgeon fossils date to the Late Cretaceous, and are descended from other, earlier acipenseriform fish, which date back to the Early Jurassic period, some 174 to 201 million years ago. They are one of two living families of the Acipenseriformes alongside paddlefish (Polyodontidae). Sturgeons are native to subtropical, temperate and sub-Arctic rivers, lakes and coastlines of Eurasia and North America. Sturgeons are long-lived, late-maturing fishes with distinctive characteristics, such as a heterocercal caudal fin similar to those of sharks, and an elongated, spindle-like body that is smooth-skinned, scaleless, and armored with five lateral rows of bony plates called scutes.

Several species can grow quite large, typically ranging 2–3.5 m (7–12 ft) in length. The largest sturgeon on record was a beluga female captured in the Volga Delta in 1827, measuring 7.2 m (23 ft 7 in) long and weighing 1,571 kg (3,463 lb). The family is grouped into five genera: Acipenser, Huso, Scaphirhynchus, Sinosturio, and Pseudoscaphirhynchus. One species (S. dabryanus) may be extinct in the wild, and another (P. fedtschenkoi) may be entirely extinct. Beginning in 2011 H. naccarii was presumed extinct in the wild, but in 2022 was downgraded to critically endangered. A Maastrichtian-age fossil found in Morocco shows that they also once lived in northern Africa during the Cretaceous.

Most sturgeons are anadromous bottom-feeders, migrating upstream to spawn but spending most of their lives feeding in river deltas and estuaries. Some species inhabit freshwater environments exclusively, while others primarily inhabit marine environments near coastal areas, and are known to venture into open ocean. The roe some of these sturgeon species spawn are harvested and processed into luxurious caviar. This has led to serious overexploitation, which combined with other conservation threats, has brought most of the species to critically endangered status, at the edge of extinction.

== Etymology ==
The English word sturgeon comes from Middle English sturgiun, in its turn from Old French estorjoun, which displaces Old English styrġa, though both are derived from Proto-Germanic *sturjô.

Apparent cognates to sturgeon can be found in Baltic, Germanic, Greek, Romance, and Slavic languages. Ancient Europe's trade in sturgeon would have caused the root word for these languages to spread across the region. Many potential reconstructions place the origin of the root word in a non-Indo-European substrate language, possibly from around a Volga River abundant in the fish, while others point to a Proto-Indo-European source. One of the latter reconstructions traces the ultimate derivation to Proto-Indo-European *str̥(Hx)yón-.

== Evolution ==
=== Fossil history ===
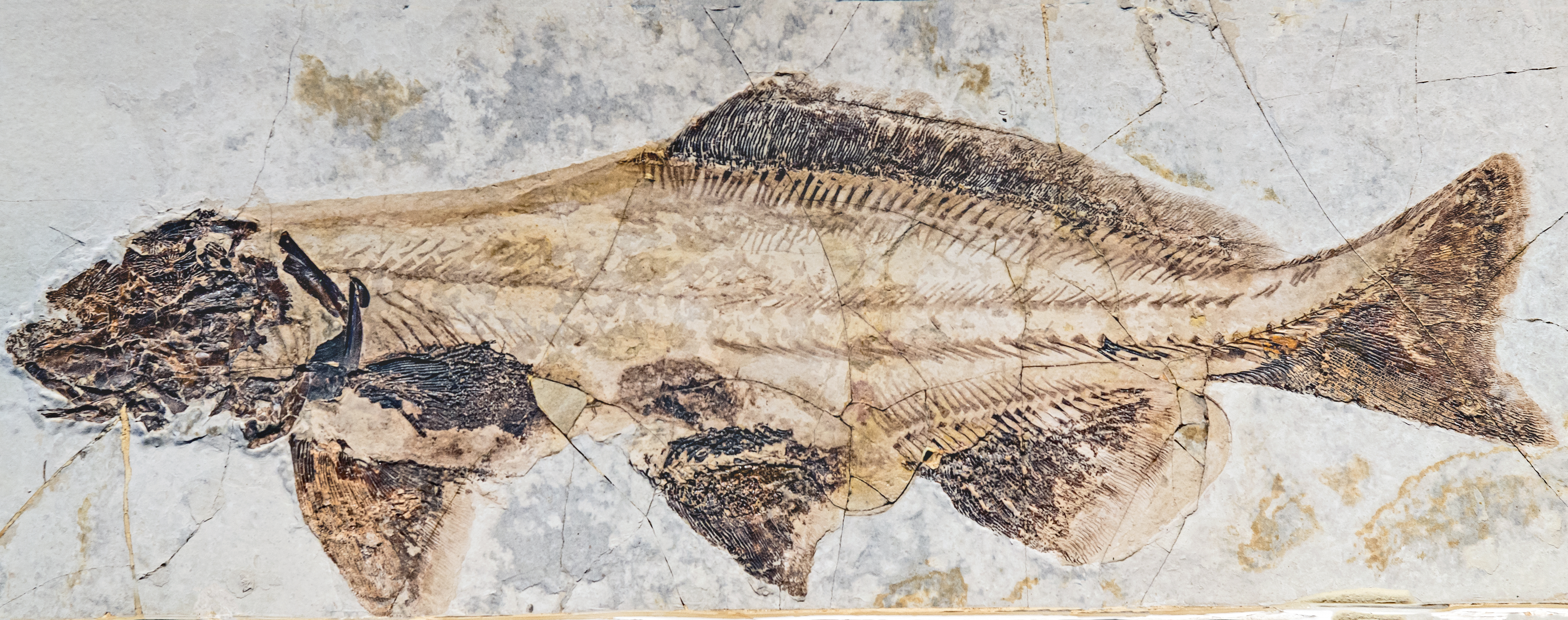
Yanosteus longidorsalis, a member of the extinct acipenseriform family Peipiaosteidae from the Early Cretaceous (125–120 Mya) Yixian Formation in Liaoning, China

Acipenseriform fishes appeared in the fossil record some 174 to 201 million years ago, during the Early Jurassic, making them some of the earliest extant actinopterygian fishes. Sturgeons must have diverged from their closest relatives, the paddlefish, during the Early Cretaceous (125-120 million years ago) or prior, as the earliest fossil paddlefish (Protopsephurus) is known from then. True sturgeons appear in the fossil record during the Upper Cretaceous, with amongst the oldest known remains being a partial skull from the Cenomanian (100–94 million years ago) of Alberta, Canada. In that time, sturgeons have undergone remarkably little morphological change, indicating their evolution has been exceptionally slow and earning them informal status as living fossils. This is explained in part by the long generation interval, tolerance for wide ranges of temperature and salinity, lack of predators due to size and bony plated armor, or scutes, and the abundance of prey items in the benthic environment. They do, however, still share several primitive characteristics, such as heterocercal tail, reduced squamation, more fin rays than supporting bony elements, and unique jaw suspension.

=== Phylogeny and taxonomy ===
Despite the existence of a fossil record, full classification and phylogeny of the sturgeon species has been difficult to determine, in part due to the high individual and ontogenic variation, including geographical clines in certain features, such as rostrum shape, number of scutes, and body length. A further confounding factor is the peculiar ability of sturgeons to produce reproductively viable hybrids, even between species assigned to different genera. While ray-finned fishes (Actinopterygii) have a long evolutionary history culminating in the most familiar fishes, past adaptive evolutionary radiations have left only a few survivors, such as sturgeons and gars.

The phylogeny of Acipenseridae, as in the cladogram, shows that they evolved from the bony fishes. In currently accepted taxonomy, the class Actinopterygii and the order Acipenseriformes are both clades. Approximate dates are from Near et al., 2012.

- Osteichthyes
  - Sarcopterygii
    - Coelacanths, lungfish
    - Tetrapods
  - Actinopterygii 400 mya
    - Cladistia
      Polypteriformes (bichirs, reedfishes)
    - Actinopteri
      - Chondrostei
        - Acipenseriformes
          - Acipenseridae
          - Polyodontidae
      - Neopterygii 360 mya
        - Holostei 275 mya
          - Lepisosteiformes (gars)
          - Amiiformes (bowfins)
        - 310 mya
          Teleostei

The wide range of the acipenserids and their endangered status have made collection of systematic materials difficult. The factors have led researchers in the past to identify over 40 additional species that were rejected by later scientists. An effort is ongoing to resolve the taxonomic confusion using a continuing synthesis of systematic data and molecular techniques.

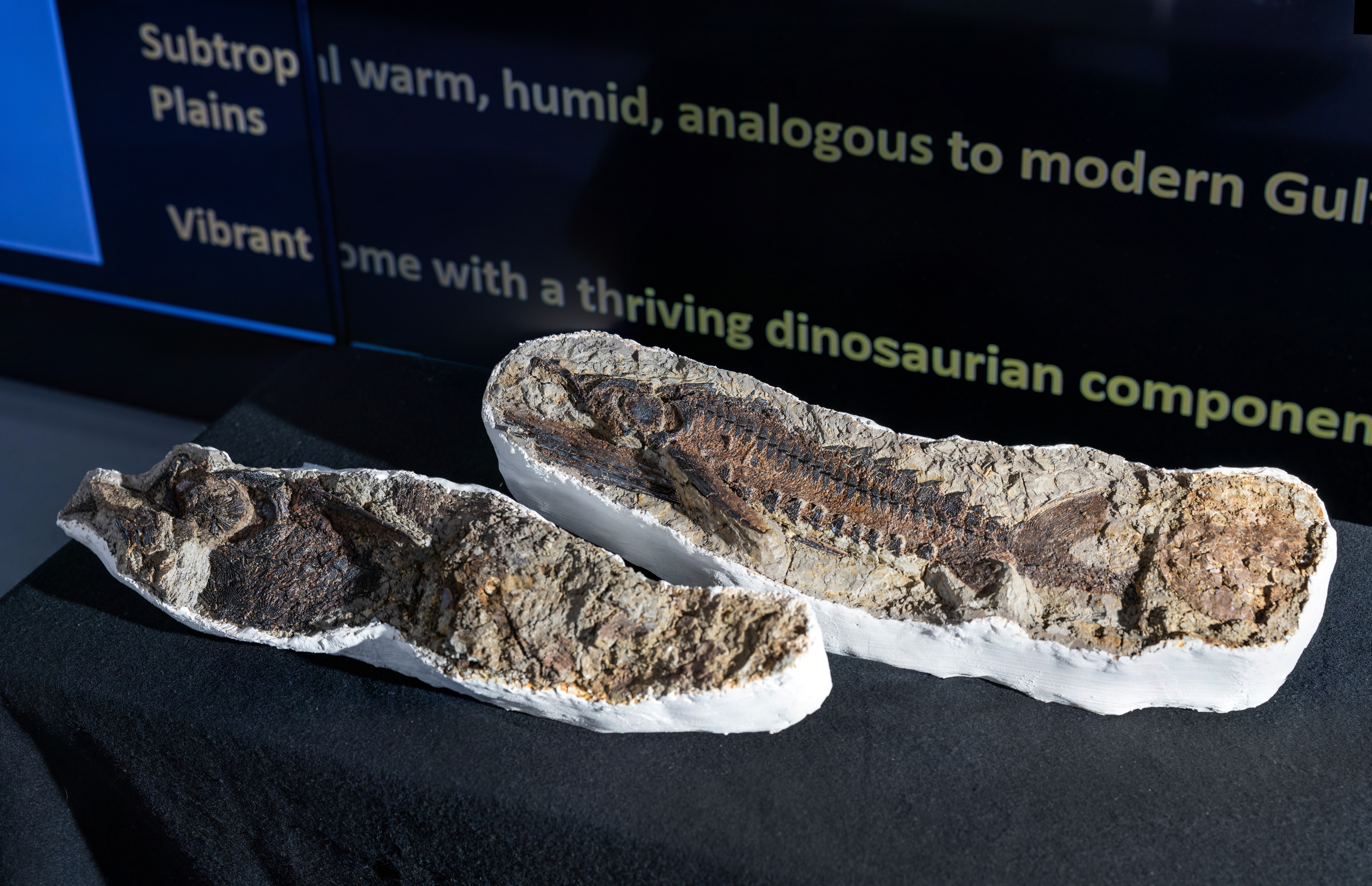
A fossil sturgeon (right) from the Tanis fossil site, showing the longstanding morphological conservatism of this group

Sturgeons are a highly morphologically conservative group, to the extent that lineages that (based on molecular data) have been separate since the Cretaceous period can physically appear very similar, and mistakenly classified as each other's closest relatives. In the classic taxonomic treatment, Acipenseridae was subdivided into 2 subfamilies; Acipenserinae, including the genera Acipenser and Huso, and Scaphirhynchinae, including the genera Scaphirhynchus and Pseudoscaphirhynchus. The family name comes from the genus Acipenser, which its name is Latin for "sturgeon"; that name is derived from ἀκκιπήσιος akkipesios in Greek from the words akís ἀκίς meaning "point", and πέντε pénte meaning "five" referring to the five rows of sharp scutes found on its body.

Under a phylogeny that exclusively incorporates morphological data, sturgeons appear to comprise two groups that diverged during the Cretaceous: a Scaphirhynchus lineage, and a Acipenser+Huso+Pseudoscaphirhynchus lineage. The latter seemingly appears rather young compared to the age of the group as a whole, with much of its radiation only occurring during the Late Paleogene and Neogene. However, with the advent of molecular phylogenetics, multiple studies since the 1990s have recovered this arrangement as paraphyletic, instead finding A. oxyrhinchus and A. sturio to form the most basal clade among sturgeons, and all other species being in a separate clade, with the various other species of Acipenser, Scaphirhynchus, Pseudoscaphirhynchus, and Huso to have varying levels of relationship with one another. The morphologically distinct "shovelnose" type sturgeons are deeply nested within the former "Acipenser" and "Huso" clades. The divergences within the group have also been found to be much deeper, with Acipenser sensu stricto diverging from the rest of the group well into the Cretaceous. The other lineages were found to have diverged from one another during the Late Cretaceous and Paleogene.

The exact placement of Scaphirhynchus varies depending on the study and the methods used, with some placing it within the second-most basal clade comprising primarily Pacific species, whereas others place it in its own clade that is more derived than the secondmost basal clade but less derived than the most derived Atlantic and Central Asian clade. No studies have yet delineated a relationship between it and Pseudoscaphirhynchus. In addition, the exact relationships of the members of the most derived, primarily Atlantic clade vary, although most analyses at least find all the species in it to form a monophyletic clade. The placement of A. sinensis also varies by the study, with some placing it as the only Pacific member of the otherwise Atlantic-based most-derived clade, whereas others place it with the rest of the Pacific sturgeons as a sister to A. dabryanus.

Brownstein & Near (2025) used DNA sequencing and morphological data to establish 5 monophyletic genera for Acipenseridae and mostly resolve the longstanding confusion over clade names. The 5 clades found were Acipenser sensu stricto, Scaphirhynchus, Pseudoscaphirhynchus, Huso, and the revived genus Sinosturio, as well as moving species out of Acipenser and into the latter two genera (including the kaluga, now Sinosturio dauricus).

The following taxonomy is based on Brownstein & Near, 2025:

- - Acipenser
    - A. sturio
    - - A. oxyrinchus
      - A. desotoi
  - - Scaphirhynchus
      - S. platorhynchus
      - - S. suttkusi
        - S. albus
    - - - Sinosturio
          - - - S. dabryanus
              - S. sinensis
            - - S. schrenckii
              - S. transmontanus
          - - - S. dauricus
              - - S. medirostris
                - S. mikadoi
      - - Pseudoscaphirhynchus
          - P. fedtschenkoi (likely extinct)
          - - P. hermanni
            - P. kaufmanni
        - Huso
          - H. fulvescens
          - - - H. huso
              - - H. stellatus
                - - H. ruthenus
                  - H. nudiventris
            - - H. brevirostrum
              - - H. baerii
                - - H. persicus
                  - - H. gueldenstaedtii
                    - - H. colchicus
                      - H. naccarii

=== Species ===
The family contains 27 recent species in 5 genera, as well as a number of fossil species and genera.

The following classification is based on Eschmeyer's Catalog of Fishes (2025):

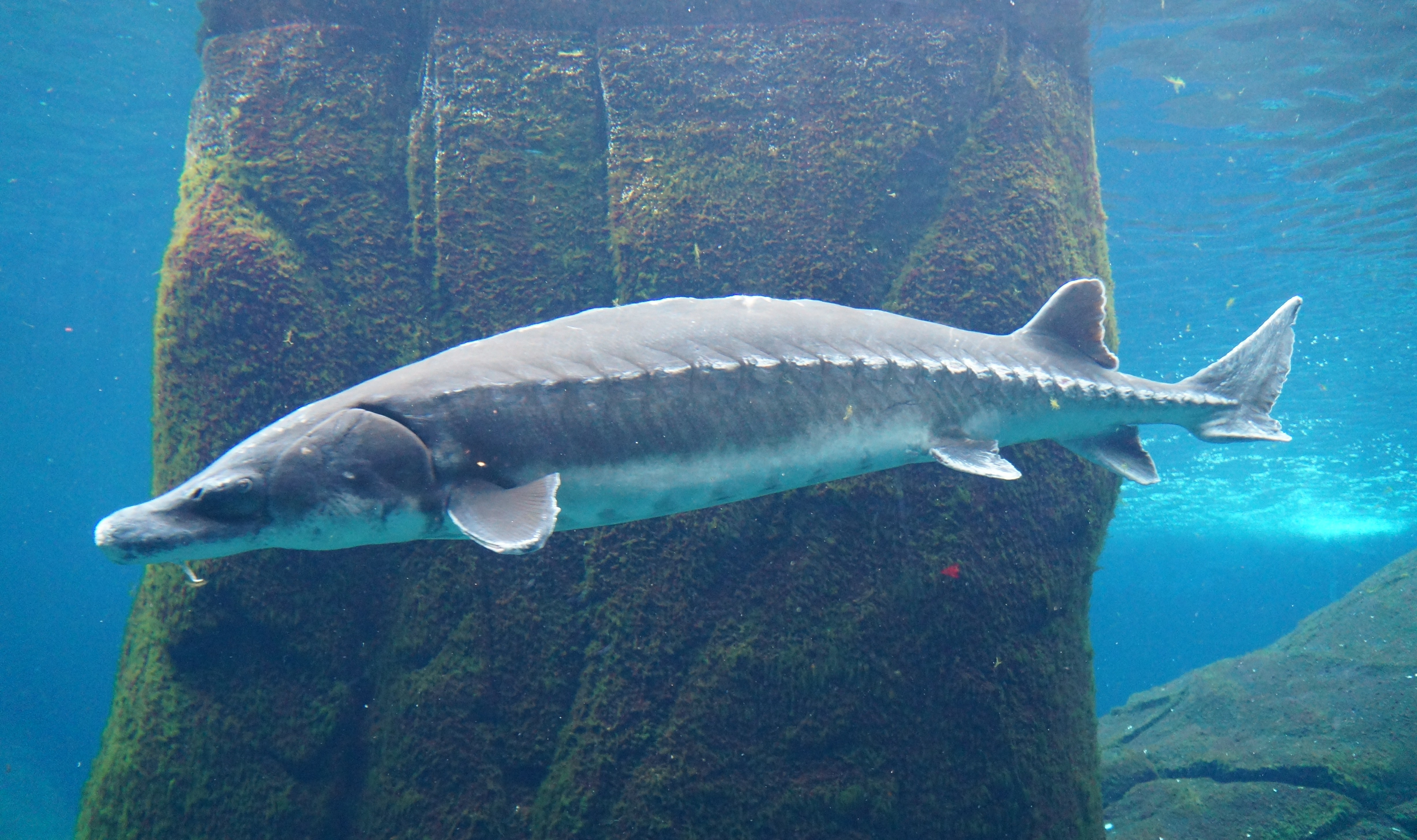
The Atlantic sturgeon (A. oxyrhynchus) is one of the most basal sturgeon species

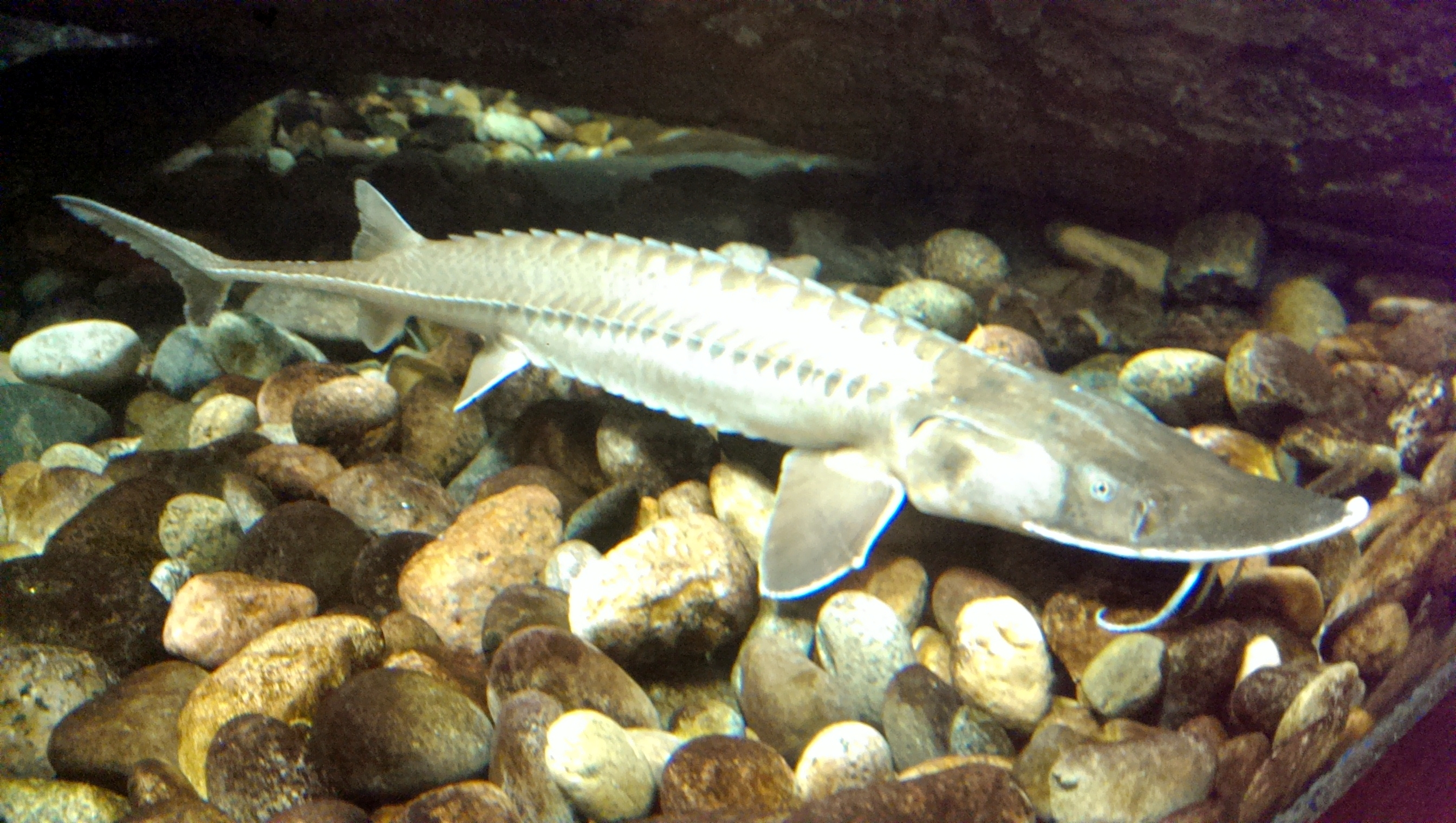
Shovelnose sturgeons (Scaphirhynchus platorynchus) are morphologically atypical members of the group

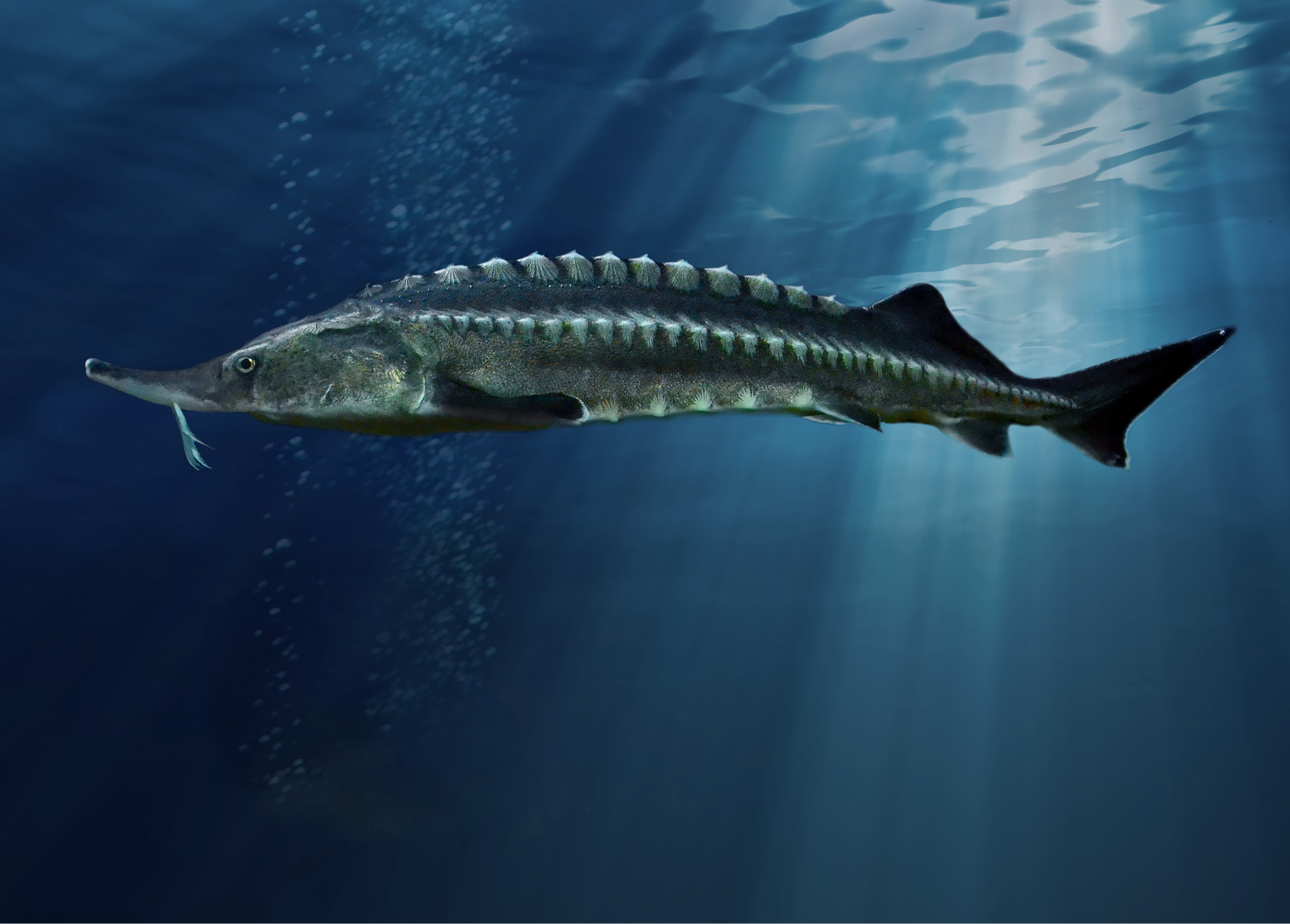
The beluga sturgeon (Huso huso) is one of the largest sturgeon species

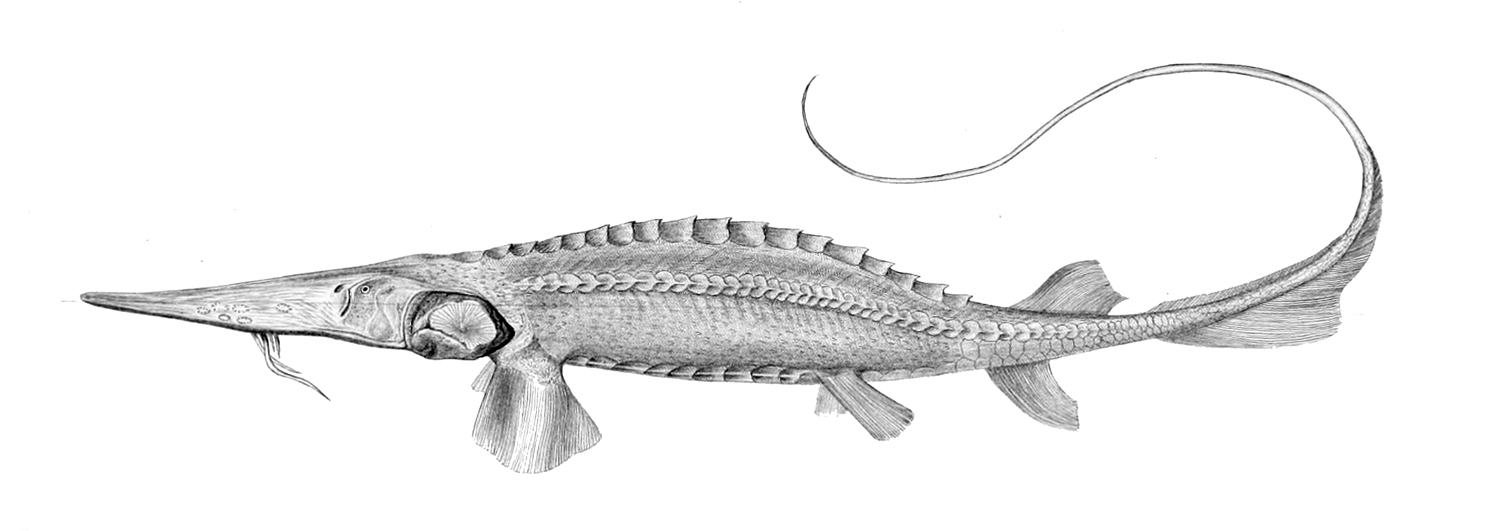
The Syr Darya sturgeon (Pseudoscaphirhynchus fedtschenkoi) is likely extinct

Family Acipenseridae

- Genus Acipenser Linnaeus, 1758 (native to eastern North America and western Europe)
  - Acipenser desotoi Vladykov, 1955 (Gulf sturgeon)
  - Acipenser oxyrinchus Mitchill, 1815 (Atlantic sturgeon)
  - Acipenser sturio Linnaeus, 1758 (European sea sturgeon)
- Genus Scaphirhynchus Heckel, 1835 (native to central North America)
  - Scaphirhynchus albus (Forbes & R. E. Richardson, 1905) (pallid sturgeon)
  - Scaphirhynchus platorynchus (Rafinesque, 1820) (shovelnose sturgeon)
  - Scaphirhynchus suttkusi J. D. Williams & Clemmer, 1991 (Alabama sturgeon)
- Genus Sinosturio Jaekel in Weigelt, 1929 (native to East Asia and western North America)
  - Sinosturio dabryanus (A. H. A. Duméril, 1869) (Yangtze sturgeon)
  - Sinosturio dauricus (Georgi, 1775) (kaluga)
  - Sinosturio medirostris (Ayres, 1854) (green sturgeon)
  - Sinosturio mikadoi (Hilgendorf, 1892) (Sakhalin sturgeon)
  - Sinosturio schrenckii (J. F. Brandt, 1869) (Amur sturgeon)
  - Sinosturio sinensis (J. E. Gray, 1835) (Chinese sturgeon)
  - Sinosturio transmontanus (J. Richardson, 1836) (white sturgeon)
- Genus Huso J. F. Brandt & Ratzeburg, 1833 (native to eastern Europe, west Asia, and eastern North America)
  - Huso baerii (J. F. Brandt, 1869) (Siberian sturgeon)
    - Huso baerii baicalensis (A. M. Nikolskii, 1896) (Baikal sturgeon)
    - Huso baerii stenorrhynchus (A. M. Nikolskii, 1896)
  - Huso brevirostrum (Lesueur, 1818) (shortnose sturgeon)
  - Huso colchicus (Marty, 1940) (Caucasian sturgeon)
  - Huso fulvescens (Rafinesque, 1817) (lake sturgeon)
  - Huso gueldenstaedtii (J. F. Brandt & Ratzeburg, 1833) (Russian sturgeon)
  - Huso huso (Linnaeus, 1758) (beluga)
  - Huso naccarii (Bonaparte, 1836) (Adriatic sturgeon)
  - Huso nudiventris (Lovetsky, 1828) (fringebarbel sturgeon)
  - Huso persicus (Borodin, 1897) (Persian sturgeon)
  - Huso ruthenus (Linnaeus, 1758) (sterlet)
  - Huso stellatus (Pallas, 1771) (starry sturgeon)
- Genus Pseudoscaphirhynchus Nikolskii, 1900 (native to Central Asia)
  - Pseudoscaphirhynchus fedtschenkoi (Kessler, 1872) (Syr Darya sturgeon)
  - Pseudoscaphirhynchus hermanni (Kessler, 1877) (dwarf sturgeon)
  - Pseudoscaphirhynchus kaufmanni (Kessler, 1877) (Amu Darya sturgeon)
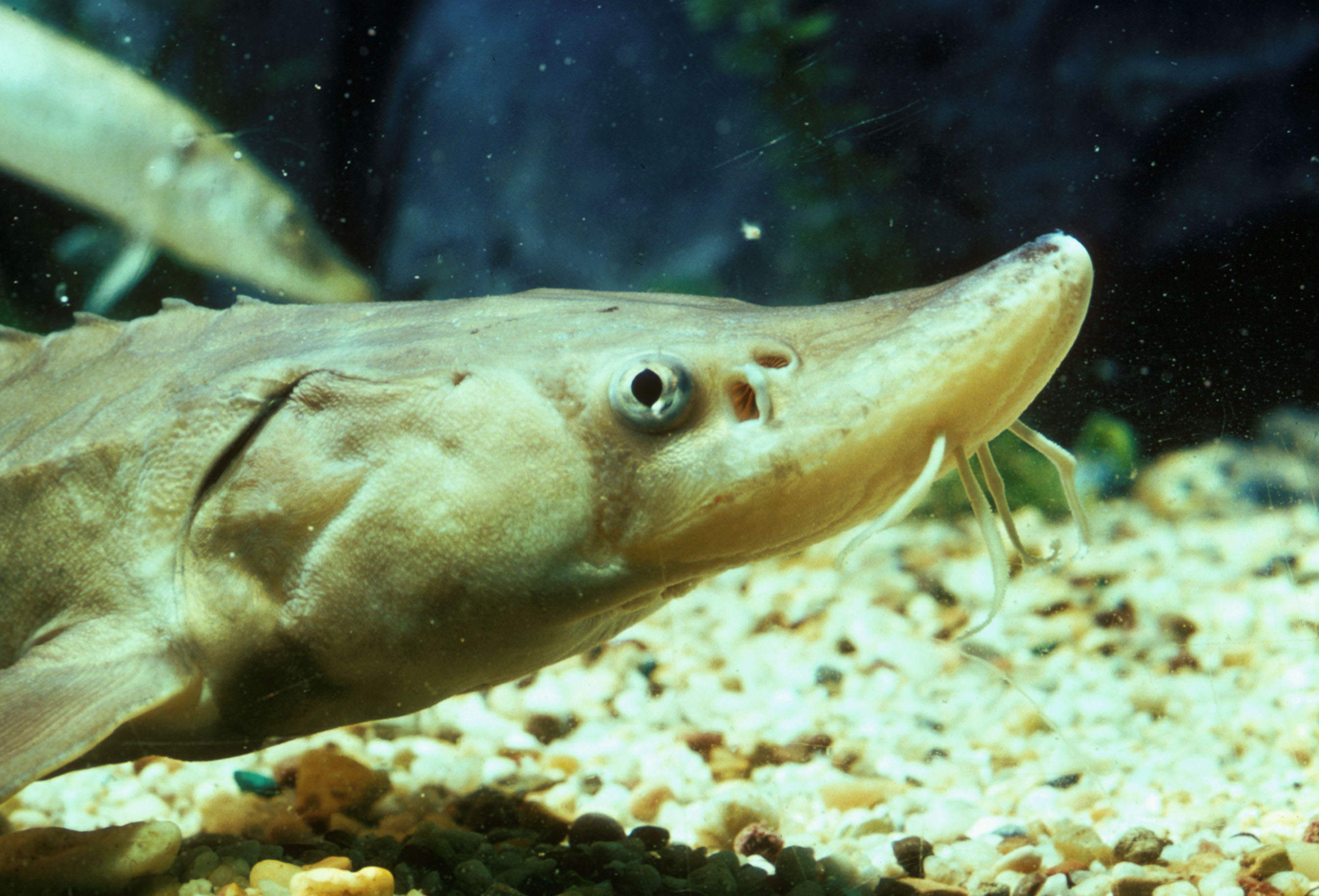
A young lake sturgeon (Huso fulvescens)

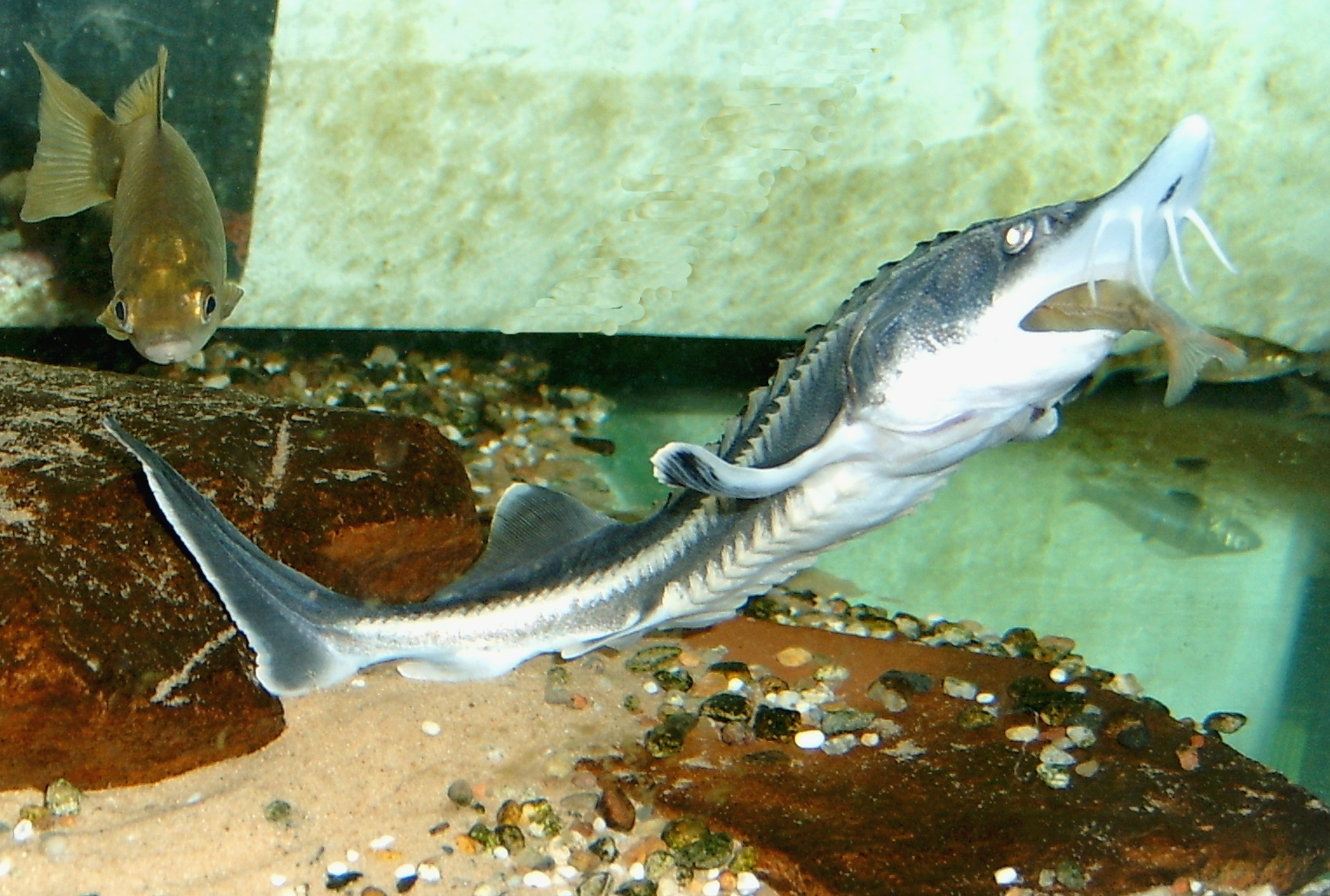
Great sturgeon or beluga (Huso huso) feeding on another fish

Pallid sturgeon (Scaphirhynchus albus) showing siphoning feeding behaviour

Beluga sturgeon in an aquarium.

==== Fossil taxa ====
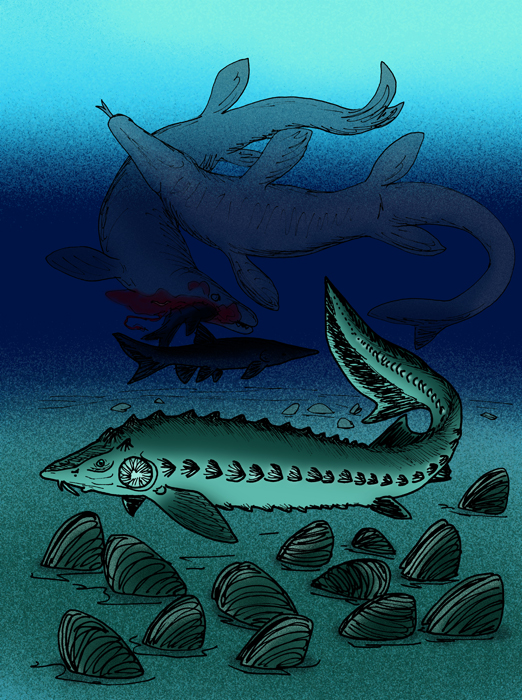
Illustration of the dubious fossil species "Acipenser" gigantissimus from the Late Cretaceous (Maastrichtian) of Russia

Fossil sturgeons are known from the mid-late Cretaceous onwards. The earliest known sturgeon fossil is of an indeterminate partial skull from the Cenomanian-aged Dunvegan Formation of Alberta, Canada. It was previously assumed that from Asiacipenser kotelnikovi Nessov, 1990 from the Late Jurassic of Kazakhstan was the earliest sturgeon, but these remains are non-diagnostic and it is unlikely that it represents a member of the family. They become particularly diverse during the Late Cretaceous of North America, where multiple different genera are known.

The following species are known:

- Genus "Acipenser" Linnaeus, 1758 (Acipenser sensu lato)
  - †"Acipenser" albertensis Lambe, 1902 (Late Cretaceous of Alberta, Canada)
  - †"Acipenser" anisinferos Hilton & Grande, 2023 (Late Cretaceous of North Dakota, USA)
  - †"Acipenser" chilini Nessov, 1983 (Early Paleocene of Kazakhstan)
  - ?†"Acipenser" cretaceous Daimeries, 1892 (Late Cretaceous of Belgium; potentially a teleost)
  - †"Acipenser" eruciferus Cope, 1876 (Late Cretaceous of Montana, USA)
  - †"Acipenser" gigantissimus Nessov, 1997 (Late Cretaceous of Saratov, Russia)
  - †"Acipenser" lemoinei (Priem, 1901) (Early Eocene of France)
  - ?†"Acipenser" molassicus Probst, 1882 (Miocene of Germany; potentially a chondrichthyan)
  - †"Acipenser" ornatus Leidy, 1873 (Miocene of Virginia, USA)
  - †"Acipenser" parisiensis Priem, 1908 (Early Oligocene of France)
  - †"Acipenser" praeparatorum Hilton & Grande, 2023 (Late Cretaceous of North Dakota, USA)
  - †"Acipenser" toliapicus Agassiz 1844 ex Woodward 1889 (Early Eocene of England)
  - ?†"Acipenser" tuberculosus Probst 1882 (Miocene of Germany; potentially a chondrichthyan)
  - †"Acipenser" zhylgensis Nessov, 1983 (Early Paleocene of Kazakhstan)
- Genus †Anchiacipenser Sato, Murray, Vernygora & Currie, 2018
  - †Anchiacipenser acanthaspis Sato, Murray, Vernygora & Currie, 2018 (Late Cretaceous of Alberta, Canada & Montana, USA)
- Genus †Boreiosturion Murray, Nelson & Brinkman, 2023
  - †Boreiosturion labyrinthicus Murray, Nelson & Brinkman, 2023 (Late Cretaceous of Alberta, Canada)
- Genus †Engdahlichthys Murray, Brinkman, DeMar & Wilson, 2020
  - †Engdahlichthys milviaegis Murray, Brinkman, DeMar & Wilson, 2020 (Early Paleocene of Montana, USA)
- Genus †Protoscaphirhynchus Wilimovsky, 1956
  - †Protoscaphirhynchus squamosus Wilimovsky, 1956 (Late Cretaceous of Montana, USA)
- Subfamily †Priscosturioninae Grande & Hilton, 2009
  - Genus †Priscosturion Grande & Hilton, 2009 (=Psammorhynchus Grande & Hilton, 2006)
    - †Priscosturion longipinnis (Grande & Hilton, 2006) (Late Cretaceous of Alberta, Canada)

Most fossil species placed in "Acipenser" are thought to be nomina dubia, being based on fragmentary remains that do not display diagnostic traits. The exceptions are "A." praeparatorum and "A." anisinferos from the Hell Creek Formation, which are known from well-preserved remains. A. praeparotorum may potentially represent a basal member of the Huso-Pseudoscaphirhynchus lineage.

== Range and habitat ==
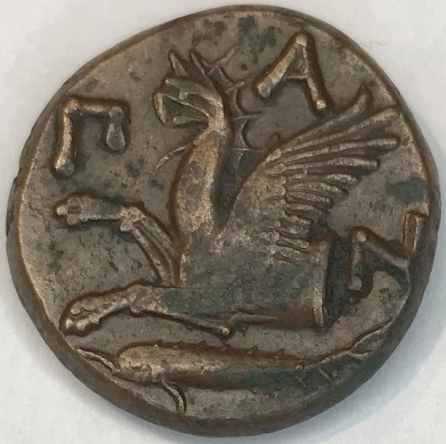
Sturgeon depicted on an ancient Greek Tetrachalkon (bronze coin) from Panticapaeum on the Crimean peninsula (Black Sea), 310–304 B.C.

Sturgeon range from subtropical to subarctic waters in North America and Eurasia. In North America, they range along the Atlantic Coast from the Gulf of Mexico to Newfoundland, including the Great Lakes and the St. Lawrence, Missouri, and Mississippi Rivers, as well as along the West Coast in major rivers from California and Idaho to British Columbia. They occur along the European Atlantic coast, including the Mediterranean basin, especially in the Adriatic Sea and the rivers of North Italy; in the rivers that flow into the Black, Azov, and Caspian Seas (Danube, Dnepr, Volga, Ural and Don); the north-flowing rivers of Russia that feed the Arctic Ocean (Ob, Yenisei, Lena, Kolyma); in the rivers of Central Asia (Amu Darya and Syr Darya) and Lake Baikal. In the Pacific Ocean, they are found in the Amur River along the Russian-Chinese border, on Sakhalin Island, and some rivers in northeast China.

Throughout this extensive range, almost all species are highly threatened or vulnerable to extinction due to a combination of habitat destruction, overfishing, and pollution.

No species is known to naturally occur south of the equator, though attempts at sturgeon aquaculture are being made in Uruguay, South Africa, and other places.

Most species are at least partially anadromous, spawning in fresh water and feeding in nutrient-rich, brackish waters of estuaries or undergoing significant migrations along coastlines. However, some species have evolved purely freshwater existences, such as the lake sturgeon (Acipenser fulvescens) and the Baikal sturgeon (A. baerii baicalensis), or have been forced into them by human or natural impoundment of their native rivers, as in the case of some subpopulations of white sturgeon (A. transmontanus) in the Columbia River and Siberian sturgeon (A. baerii) in the Ob basin.

== Physical characteristics ==
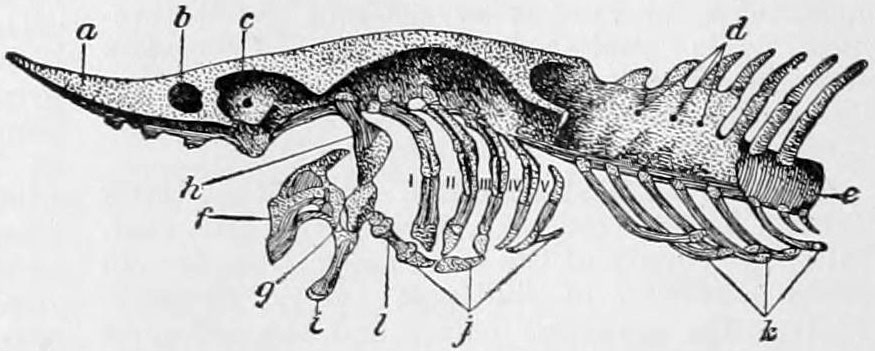
Sturgeon skull – a, Rostrum; b, nasal capsule; c eye-socket; d, foramina for spinal nerves; e, notochord; g, quadrate bone; h, hyomandibular bone; i, mandible; j. basibranchials; k, ribs; l, hyoid bone; I, II, III, IV, V, branchial arches

Sturgeons retain several primitive characteristics from the bony fish. Along with other members of the subclass Chondrostei, they are unique among bony fishes because their skeletons are almost entirely cartilaginous. To maintain structure, sturgeons are one of few vertebrates to retain a post-embryonic notochord that acts like a soft spine running through the body. Notably, however, the cartilaginous skeleton is not a primitive character, but a derived one; sturgeon ancestors had bony skeletons. They also lack vertebral centra, and are partially covered with five lateral rows of scutes rather than scales. They also have four barbels—sensory organs that precede their wide, toothless mouths. They navigate their riverine habitats traveling just off the bottom with their barbels dragging along gravel, or murky substrate. Sturgeon are recognizable for their elongated bodies, flattened rostra, distinctive scutes and barbels, and elongated upper tail lobes. The skeletal support for the paired fins of ray-finned fish is inside the body wall, although the ray-like structures in the webbing of the fins can be seen externally.

Sturgeons are among the largest fish: some beluga (Huso huso) in the Caspian Sea reportedly attain over 5.5 metres (18 ft) and 2,000 kilograms (4,400 lb) while for kaluga (H. dauricus) in the Amur River, similar lengths and over 1,000 kg (2,200 lb) weights have been reported. They are also among the longest-lived of the fishes, some living well over 100 years and attaining sexual maturity at 20 years or more. The combination of slow growth and reproductive rates and the extremely high value placed on mature, egg-bearing females make sturgeon particularly vulnerable to overfishing.

Sturgeons are polyploid; some species have four, eight, or 16 sets of chromosomes.

== Life cycle ==
Sturgeons are long-lived, late-maturing fishes. Their average lifespan is 50 to 60 years, and their first spawn does not occur until they are around 15 to 20 years old. Sturgeons are broadcast spawners, and do not spawn every year because they require specific conditions. Those requirements may or may not be met every year due to varying environmental conditions, such as the proper photoperiod in spring, clear water with shallow rock or gravel substrate, where the eggs can adhere, and proper water temperature and flow for oxygenation of the eggs. A single female may release 100,000 to 3 million eggs, but not all will be fertilized. The fertilized eggs become sticky and adhere to the bottom substrate upon contact. Eight to 15 days are needed for the embryos to mature into larval fish. During that time, they are dependent on their yolk sacs for nourishment. River currents carry the larvae downstream into backwater areas, such as oxbows and sloughs, where the free-swimming fry spend their first year feeding on insect larvae and crustacea. During their first year of growth, they reach 18 to 20 cm (7 to 8 in) in length and migrate back into the swift-flowing currents in the main stem river.

== Behavior ==
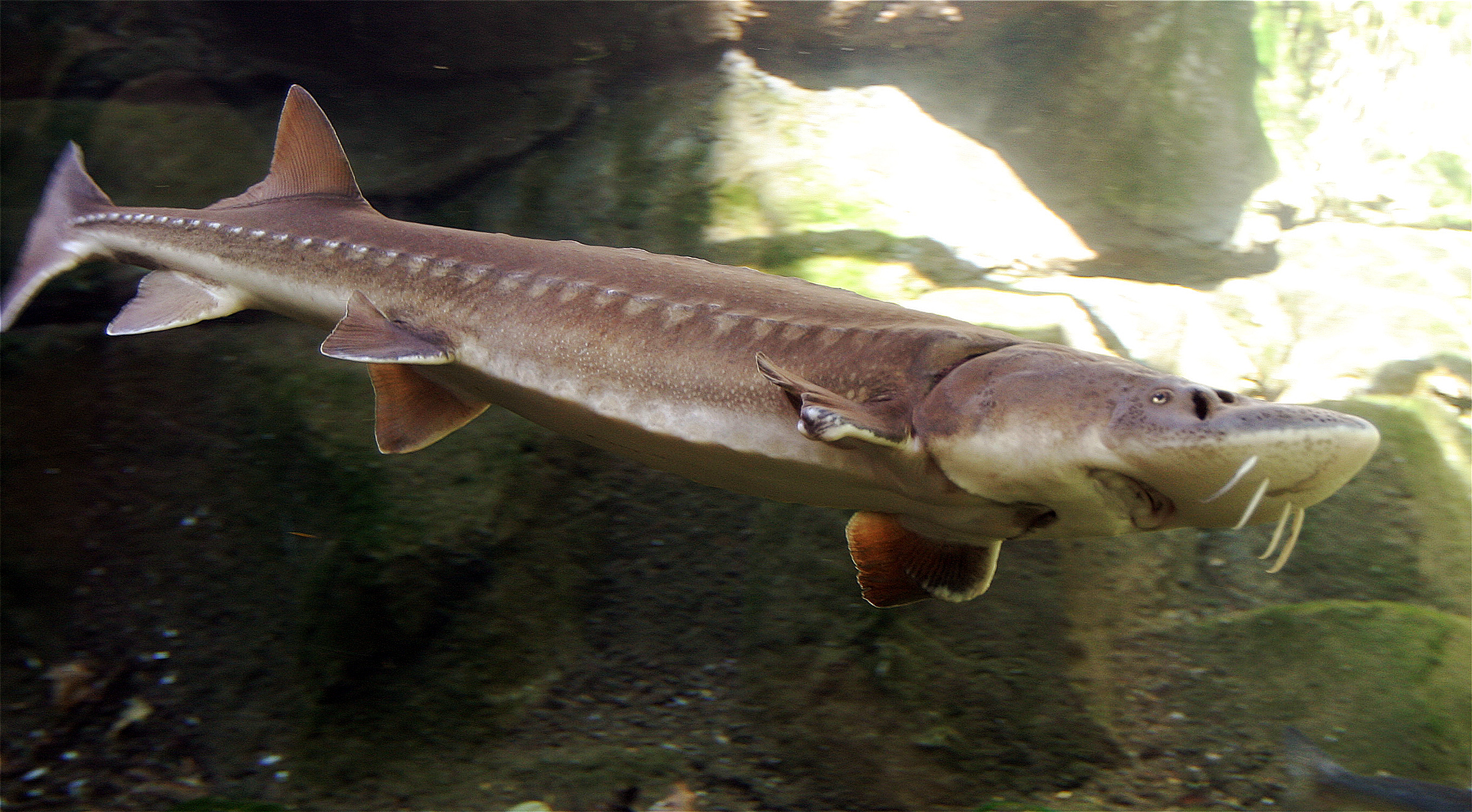
The underside and mouth of a sturgeon

Sturgeons are primarily benthic feeders, with a diet of shellfish, crustaceans, and small fish. Exceptionally, the beluga sturgeon, the kaluga sturgeon, the white sturgeon and the pallid sturgeon all feed primarily on other fish as adults. They feed by extending their siphon-like mouths to suck food from the benthos. Having no teeth, they are unable to seize prey, though larger individuals and more predatory species can swallow very large prey items, including whole salmon. Sturgeons feed non-visually. They are believed to use a combination of sensors, including olfactory, tactile, and chemosensory cues detected by the four barbels, and electroreception using their ampullae of Lorenzini.

The sturgeons' electroreceptors are located on the head and are sensitive to weak electric fields generated by other animals or geoelectric sources. The electroreceptors are thought to be used in various behaviors such as feeding, mating and migration.

Many sturgeons leap completely out of the water, usually making a loud splash which can be heard half a mile away on the surface and probably farther under water. Why they do this is not known, but suggested functions include group communication to maintain group cohesion, catching airborne prey, courtship display, or to help shed eggs during spawning. Other plausible explanations include escape from predators, shedding parasites, or to gulp or expel air. Another explanation is that it "simply feels good". There have been some incidents of leaping sturgeon landing in boats and causing injuries to humans; in 2015, a 5-year-old girl was fatally injured after a sturgeon leapt from the Suwannee River and struck her.

In 1731, an observer of leaping sturgeon wrote:

...in May, June and July, the rivers abound with them, at which time it is surprising, though very common to see such large fish elated in the air, by their leaping some yards out of the water; this they do in an erect posture, and fall on their sides, which repeated percussions are loudly heard some miles distance....

== Interactions with humans ==
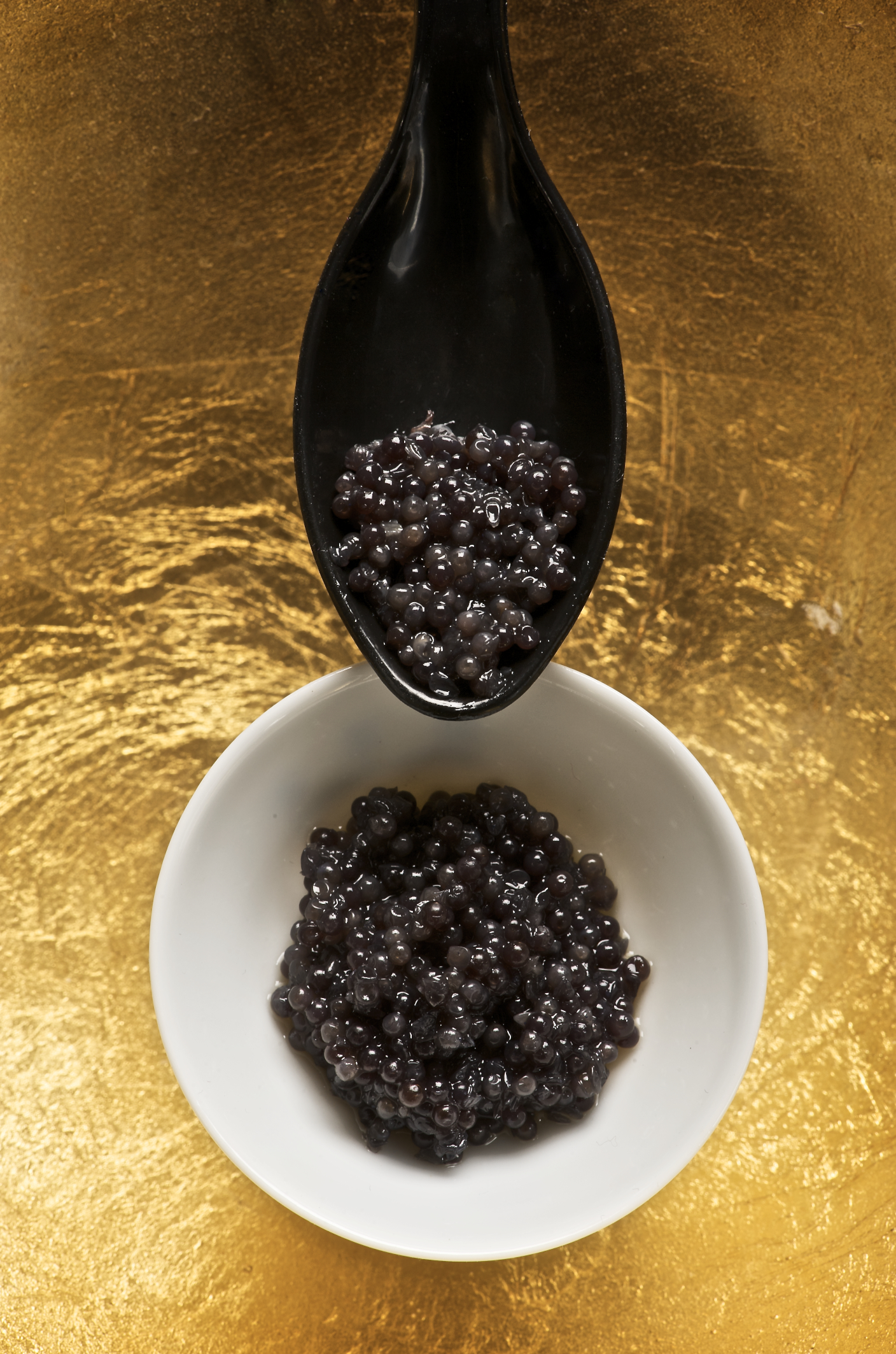
The demand for caviar has driven several species of sturgeon toward extinction.

=== Caviar ===
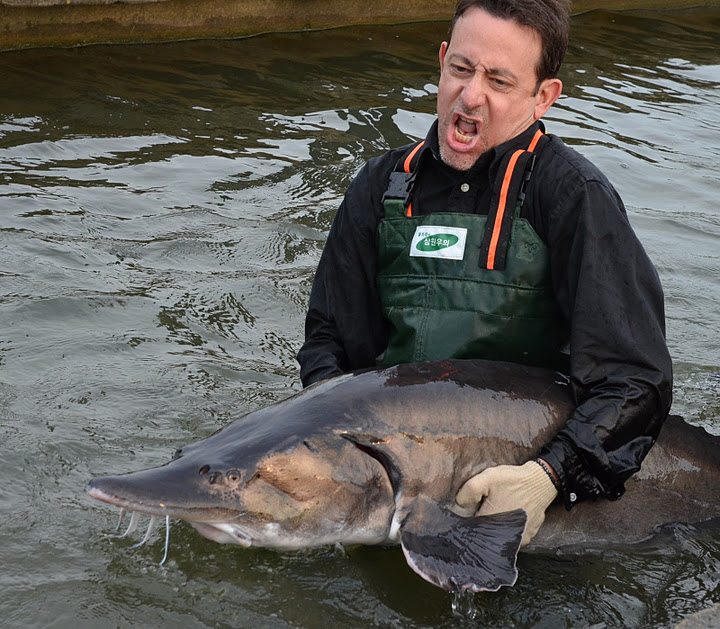
Beluga sturgeon at a caviar farm in South Korea

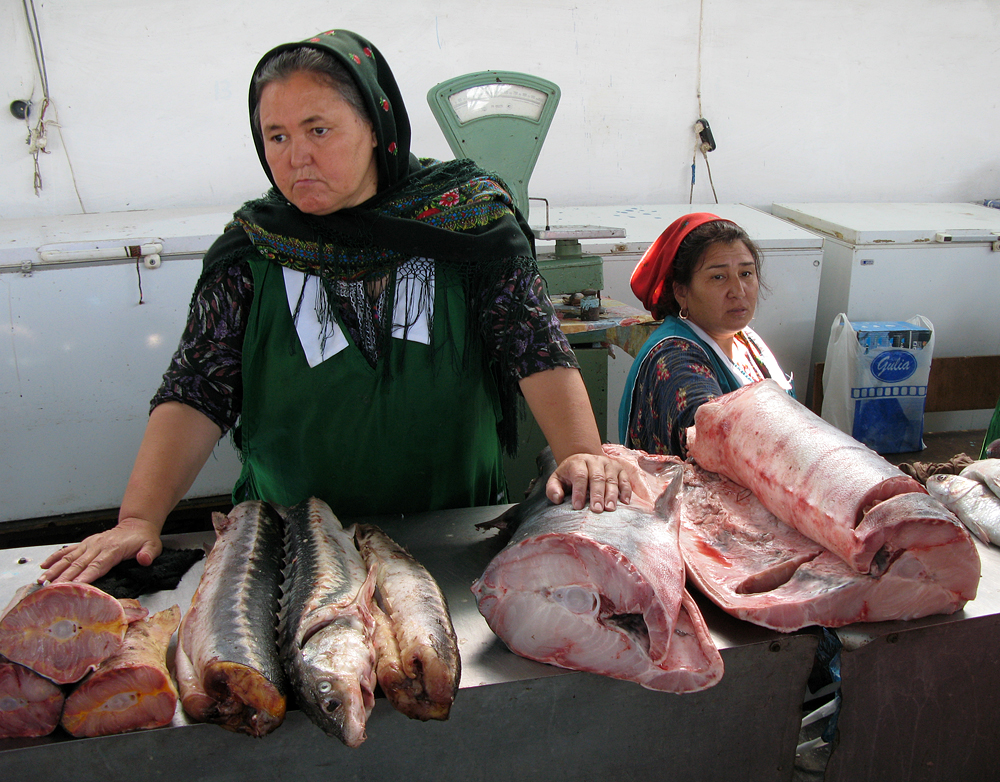
Woman selling sturgeon at a market in Türkmenbaşy, Turkmenistan

Globally, sturgeon fisheries are of great value, primarily as a source for caviar, but also for flesh. Several species of sturgeon are harvested for their roe which is processed into caviar—a delicacy, and the reason why caviar-producing sturgeons are among the most valuable and endangered of all wildlife resources.

During the 19th century, the US was the global leader in caviar production, having cornered 90% of the world's caviar trade. Atlantic sturgeon once thrived along the east coast from Canada down to Florida. They were in such abundance in the Hudson River that they were humorously called "Albany beef" and sturgeon eggs were given away at local bars as an accompaniment to 5¢ beer. White sturgeon populations along the US west coast declined simultaneously under the pressure of commercial fishing and human encroachment. Within the course of a century, the once abundant sturgeon fisheries in the US and Canada had drastically declined, and in some areas had been extirpated under the pressure of commercial overharvesting, pollution, human encroachment, habitat loss, and the damming of rivers that blocked their ancestral migration to spawning grounds.

By the turn of the century, commercial production of sturgeon caviar in the US and Canada had come to an end. Regulatory protections and conservation efforts were put in place by state and federal resource agencies in the US and Canada, such as the 1998 US federal moratorium that closed all commercial fishing for Atlantic sturgeon. It was during the 20th century that Russia grew to become the global leader as the largest producer and exporter of caviar. As with the decline in sturgeon populations in the US and Canada, the same occurred with sturgeon populations in the Caspian Sea.

Beginning with the 1979 US embargo on Iran, poaching and smuggling sturgeon caviar was big business but an illegal and dangerous one. Officers with the Washington Department of Fish and Wildlife (WDFW) busted a poaching ring that was based in Vancouver, Washington. The poachers had harvested 1.65 tons of caviar from nearly 2,000 white sturgeon that were poached from the Columbia River. The caviar was estimated to be worth around $2 million. WDFW busted another ring in 2003, and conducted an undercover sting operation in 2006–2007 that resulted in 17 successful attempts out of a total of 19.

In response to concerns over the future of sturgeons and associated commercial products, international trade for all species of sturgeons has been regulated under CITES since 1998.

=== Conservation ===
Sturgeons are threatened by the negative impacts of overfishing, poaching, habitat destruction, and the construction of dams that have altered or blocked their annual migration to ancestral spawning grounds. Some species of sturgeon are extinct, and several are on the verge of extinction, including the Chinese sturgeon, the highly prized beluga sturgeon, and the Alabama sturgeon. Many species are classified as threatened or endangered, with noticeable declines in sturgeon populations as the demand for caviar increases. IUCN data indicates that over 85% of sturgeon species are at risk of extinction, making them more critically endangered than any other group of animal species.

In addition to global restocking efforts, the monitoring of populations and habitat, and various other conservation efforts by national and state resource agencies as applicable to their respective countries, several conservation organizations have been formed to assist in the preservation of sturgeons around the world. On a global scale, one such organization is the World Sturgeon Conservation Society (WSCS) whose primary objectives include fostering the "conservation of sturgeon species and restoration of sturgeon stocks world-wide", and supporting the "information exchange among all persons interested in sturgeons." The North American Sturgeon and Paddlefish Society (NASPS) and Gesellschaft zur Rettung des Störs e.V. are WSCS affiliates. WSCS has been instrumental in organizing global conferences where scientists and researchers can exchange information and address the various conservation challenges that threaten the future of sturgeons. Conservation efforts at the grass roots level are also instrumental in helping to preserve sturgeon populations, such as Sturgeon For Tomorrow which was founded in 1977, consists of volunteers and a sturgeon guarding program to monitor known spawning sites. The organization has grown exponentially over the years and has become "the largest citizen advocacy group for sturgeon in the world", and has expanded with affiliate chapters in other states that have sturgeon populations. Other projects focus on specific local issues, such as the We Pass project, seeking a solution to the migratory impasse represented by the Iron Gates in the Danube River Basin. For example, currently all anadromous Danube sturgeon (all species except the predominantly freshwater sterlet) are now classed as Critically Endangered or extirpated from the upper and middle reaches of the Danube River above the dams.

=== Other uses ===
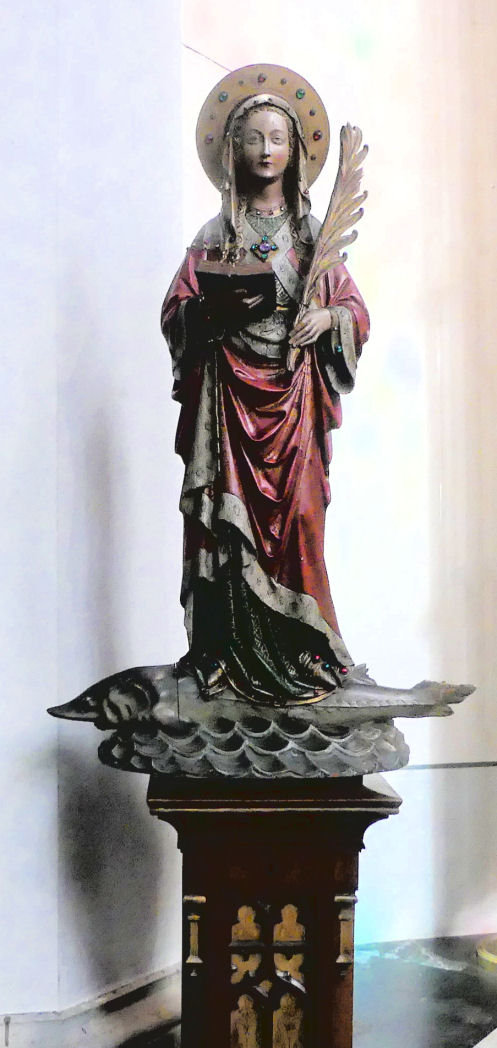
St Amalberga riding a sturgeon

Before 1800, swim bladders of sturgeon (primarily Beluga sturgeon from Russia) were used as a source of isinglass, a form of collagen used historically for the clarification of wine and beer, as a predecessor for gelatin, and to preserve parchments.

The Jewish laws of kashrut, which only permit the consumption of fish with both scales and fins, forbids sturgeon, as they have ganoid scales instead of the permitted ctenoid and cycloid scales. While all Orthodox groups forbid the consumption of sturgeon, some Conservative groups do allow it. The theological debate over its kosher status can be traced back to such 19th-century reformers as Aron Chorin, though its consumption was already common in European Jewish communities.

Sturgeons were declared to be a royal fish under a statute dating back to 1324 by King Edward II of England. Technically, the British monarchy still owns all sturgeons, whales, and dolphins that inhabit the waters around England and Wales. Under the law of the United Kingdom, any sturgeons captured within the realm are personal property of the monarch.

Similar laws reserving sturgeon for the king were enforced in late medieval Denmark. An archaeological example of sturgeon in a royal context comes from the wreck of the Danish-Norwegian flagship, Gribshunden, which sank in June 1495 while King Hans sailed from Copenhagen to Kalmar, Sweden for a diplomatic summit. Archaeologists recovered from the wreck a cask containing a butchered sturgeon, probably intended for the king's table during feasts in Kalmar.

In heraldry, a sturgeon is the symbol on the coat of arms for Saint Amalberga of Temse.

== Notes ==
- This article incorporates text from a publication now in the public domain: Chisholm, Hugh, ed. (1911). "Sturgeon" . Encyclopædia Britannica (11th ed.). Cambridge University Press.
