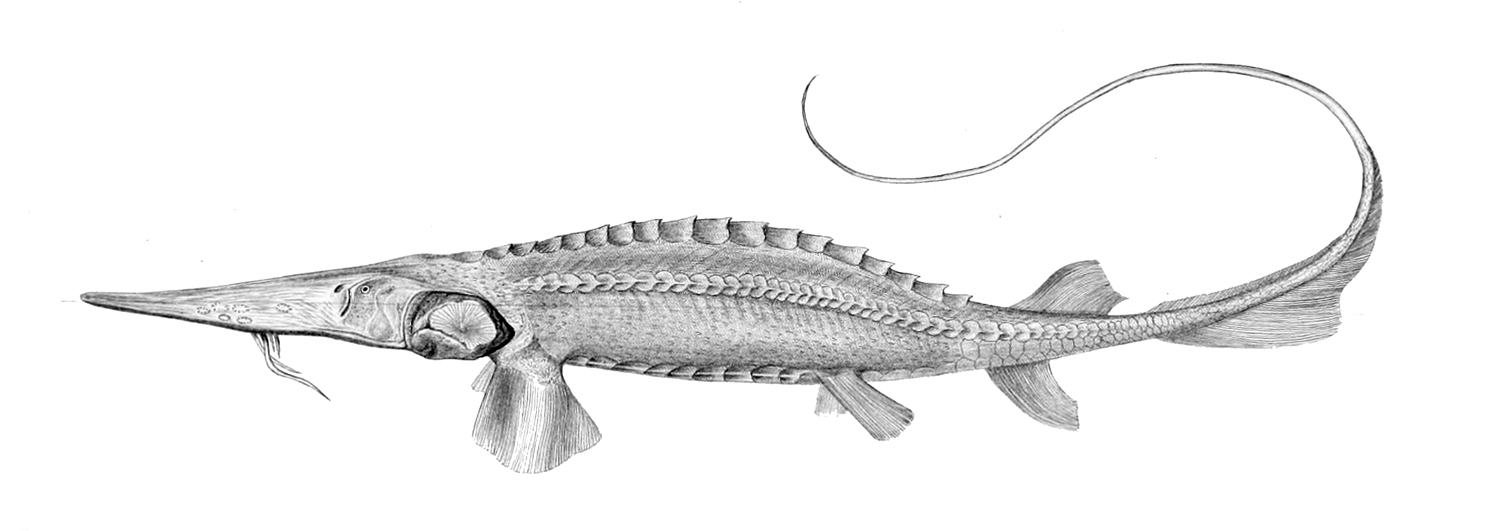
- A Syr Darya sturgeon

Conservation status
- Critically endangered, possibly extinct (IUCN 3.1)
- CITES Appendix II

Scientific classification
- Kingdom: Animalia
- Phylum: Chordata
- Class: Actinopterygii
- Order: Acipenseriformes
- Family: Acipenseridae
- Genus: Pseudoscaphirhynchus
- Species: P. fedtschenkoi

Binomial name
- Pseudoscaphirhynchus fedtschenkoi (Kessler, 1872)
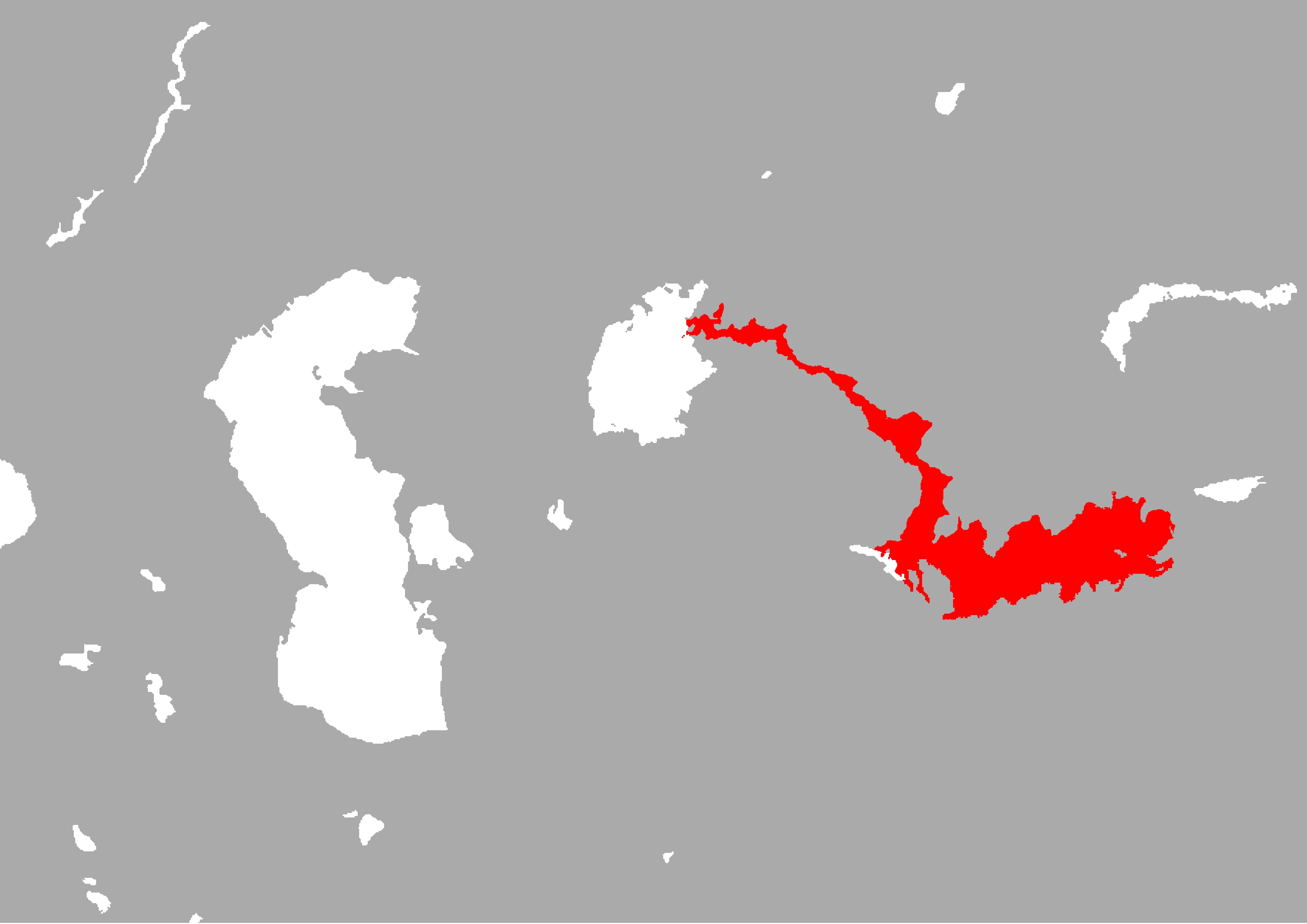

Synonyms
- Scaphirhynchus fedtschenkoi Kessler 1872; Kessleria fedtschenkoi (Kessler 1872); Pseudoscaphirhynchus fedtschenkoi f. brevirostris Berg 1905; Pseudoscaphirhynchus fedtschenkoi f. intermedia Berg 1905; Pseudoscaphirhynchus fedtschenkoi f. longirostris Berg 1905

= Syr Darya sturgeon =

Species of fish

The Syr Darya sturgeon (Pseudoscaphirhynchus fedtschenkoi), or Syr Darya shovelnose sturgeon, is a species of fish in the family Acipenseridae. It is found in Kazakhstan, Tajikistan and Uzbekistan, where it is endemic to the Syr Darya River and, before its drainage, the Aral Sea. Due to the loss of its breeding site and damming projects over the length of the river, it is currently considered Critically Endangered (Possibly Extinct), as no sightings have been reported since the 1960s. The sturgeon is among the 25 "most wanted lost" species that are the focus of Re:wild's "Search for Lost Species" initiative.

== Taxonomy ==
The Syr Darya sturgeon belongs to the genus Pseudoscaphirhynchus, which is a genus of sturgeon that are restricted to the Aral Sea systems. A study of the mitochondrial DNA of the members of the genus conducted published in 2020 showed that the genus is monophyletic, and that the two other species in the genus are more closely related to each other than they are to the Syr Darya sturgeon.

The original classification for the species proposed by Kessler put it in the genus Scaphirhynchus, which are a group of sturgeons native to North America, based on its morphological similarities to members of the genus.

=== Etymology ===
The species is named after Alexei Fedchenko, who collected the type specimen from Turkestan in 1871.

== Description ==
The Syr Darya sturgeon is considered one of the smallest species of sturgeon with a maximum length of 30 cm (11.8 in). They reach a total length of up to 36 cm (14.2 in), and a standard length of 27 cm (10.6 in).

The body of the fish is fusiform, with a thick front.

The broad head ends in a spade-like snout. The length of the snout varies greatly between individuals, but is never less than 3/4 of the total length of the head or less than 1/4 of the length of the whole body to the base of the caudal fin (tail fin). The mouth is located on the lower side of the head, and has fleshy, eight-lobed, tubercular lips. They have four barbels a bit of distance from the front of their mouth. The barbels are not fringed, are placed in a curved line, and are closer to the mouth than the end of the snout. They have eyes with a diameter that doesn't exceed 2 mm.

There are five rows of scutes down the body, the upper (dorsal) row ends at the beginning of the dorsal fin, the abdominal rows end at the base of the ventral fins (pelvic fins), and the lateral rows extend to the end of the tail. The tail is slightly flattened and is covered with osseous (bony) scutes, and the end becomes a long filament. The length of this filament is around 2/3 the length of the fish's body.

The swim bladder of the species is small and "rudimentary", which may be due to its benthic lifestyle.

=== Morphs ===
In his 1962 book, Freshwater fish of the U.S.S.R. and adjacent countries, L.S. Berg described there being three morphs to the species. The typical morph was described as having a long rostrum (snout) and an absent or almost absent caudal (tail) filament, the brevirostrum morph was described as having a short snout and a long tail filament, and the intermedia morph was described as having a longer snout and a well-developed tail filament.

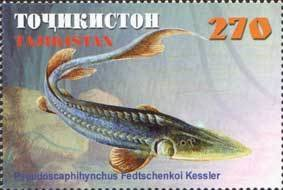
Syr Darya sturgeon depicted on a postage stamp from Tajikistan

== Distribution and habitat ==
The species is endemic to the Syr Darya river drainage, and is found in Kazakhstan, Tajikistan, and Uzbekistan. It is found in the parts of the Syr Darya river downstream of the Kara Darya river confluence, and the Chirchiq river in Uzbekistan. There is speculation that it may also inhabit large tributaries. It was also once found in the Aral Sea, but was extirpated from that area after the sea was drained and became hypersaline.

== Ecology and behaviour ==
Adults of the species were benthophagus (bottom-feeders), and feed mainly on midge larvae and other aquatic invertebrates. They are also rheophilic, meaning that they prefer to live in fast-moving water. The average generation length for the species was calculated to be 18 years.

== History and decline ==
=== Initial description ===
The fish was first officially described by Karl Kessler in 1872, from specimens collected by Alexei Fedchenko in 1871. These specimens were collected from the Syr Darya river (called the Suir-dar river in the original report). According to Kessler's notes the species was considered by the local fishermen to be the young of the sturgeon of the Aral Sea, and not a distinct species of their own.

=== Decline ===
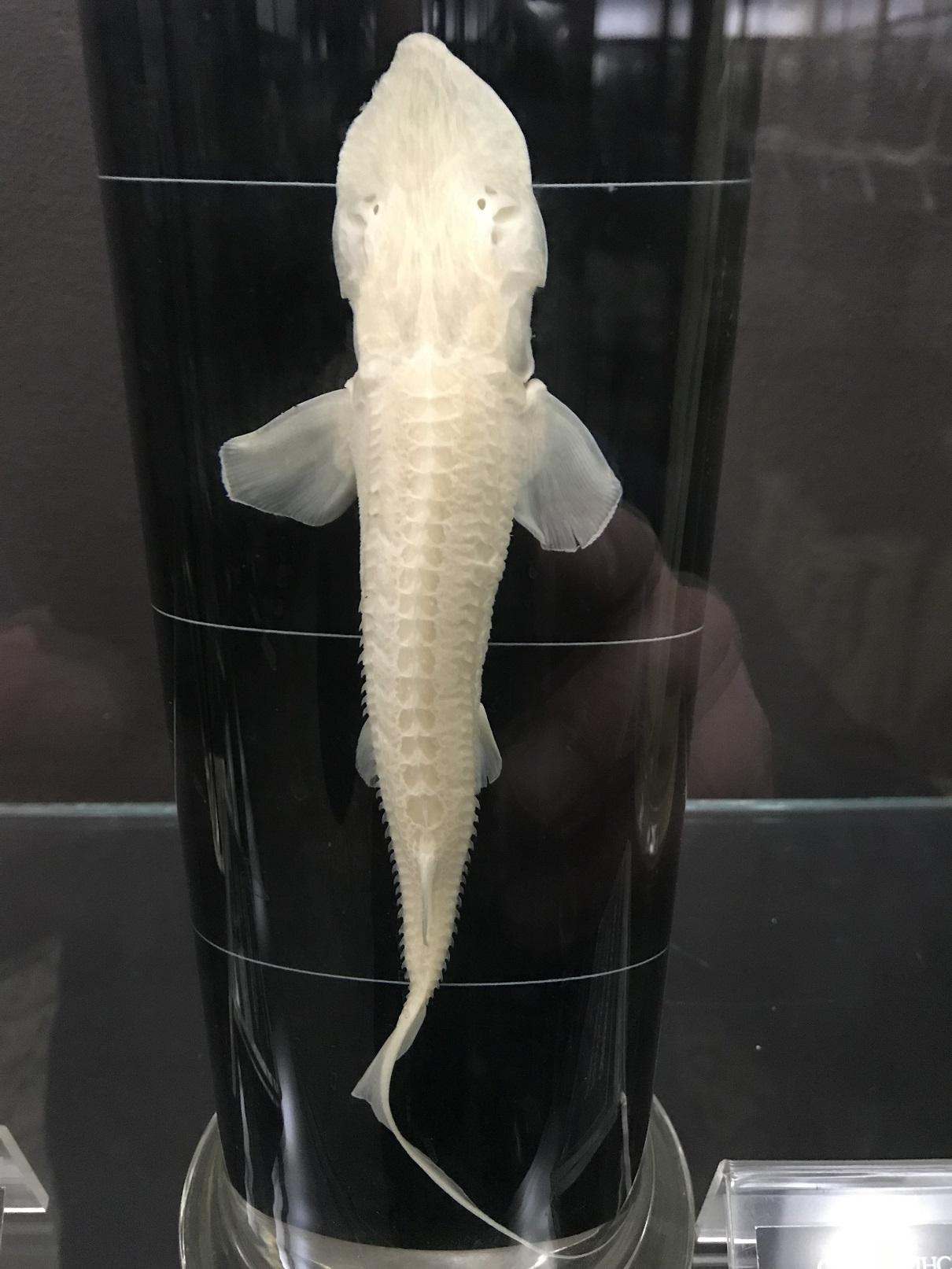
Preserved specimen from the Zoological Museum of Moscow University

The species was last seen in Kazakhstan in the 1960s. The last confirmed sighting recognized by the IUCN was in 1968. It was added to the Red Book of Kazakhstan, which is an illustration publication of lists of rare and endangered species in the country, in 1978.

==== Causes of decline ====
Damming, water extraction, and pollution in the sturgeon's habitat has led to habitat degradation. The draining of, and hypersalinity in, the Aral Sea caused the fish to become extirpated from it.

=== Unconfirmed sightings ===
There have been a few reported unconfirmed incidental captures of the species since its last confirmed sighting. One of these occurred in 2015 in the Shardara Water Reservoir of the Syr Darya river in Kazakhstan, and another in 2016 in the Syr Darya river near the border of Kazakhstan and Uzbekistan. Another unconfirmed capture occurred in 2017.

=== Surveys ===
==== 2019 survey ====
The species was one of 25 chosen by Global Wildlife Conservation (now known as Re:wild) for its Lost Species campaign. It is one of their top 10 most wanted freshwater fishes in their Search for Lost Fishes initiative.

In December 2019 a Re:wild-supported Kazakh-American-Russian survey was done on the sections of the Syr Darya river where the 2015 and 2016 unconfirmed sightings occurred, but no sightings or captures were reported. The expedition was led by Dr. Bernie Kuhajda, an aquatic conservation biologist at the Tennessee Aquarium Conservation Institute. Other members of the expedition included Alexey Chernyak, a project manager for the Eurasian Regional Association of Zoos and Aquariums, and Dave Neely, an adjunct scientist at the Tennessee Aquarium Conservation Institute.
