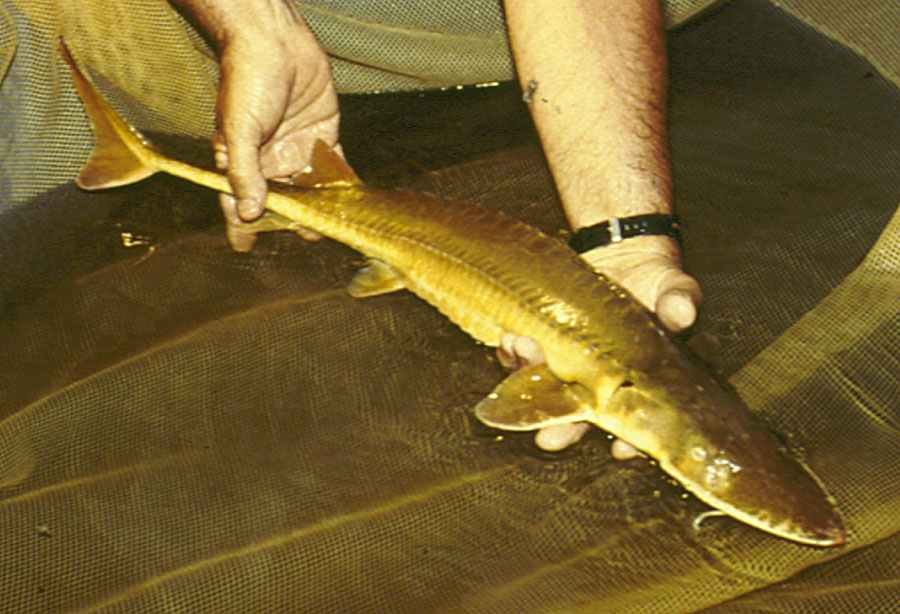

Conservation status
- Critically Endangered (IUCN 3.1)
- CITES Appendix II

Scientific classification
- Kingdom: Animalia
- Phylum: Chordata
- Class: Actinopterygii
- Order: Acipenseriformes
- Family: Acipenseridae
- Genus: Scaphirhynchus
- Species: S. suttkusi

Binomial name
- Scaphirhynchus suttkusi J. D. Williams & Clemmer 1991
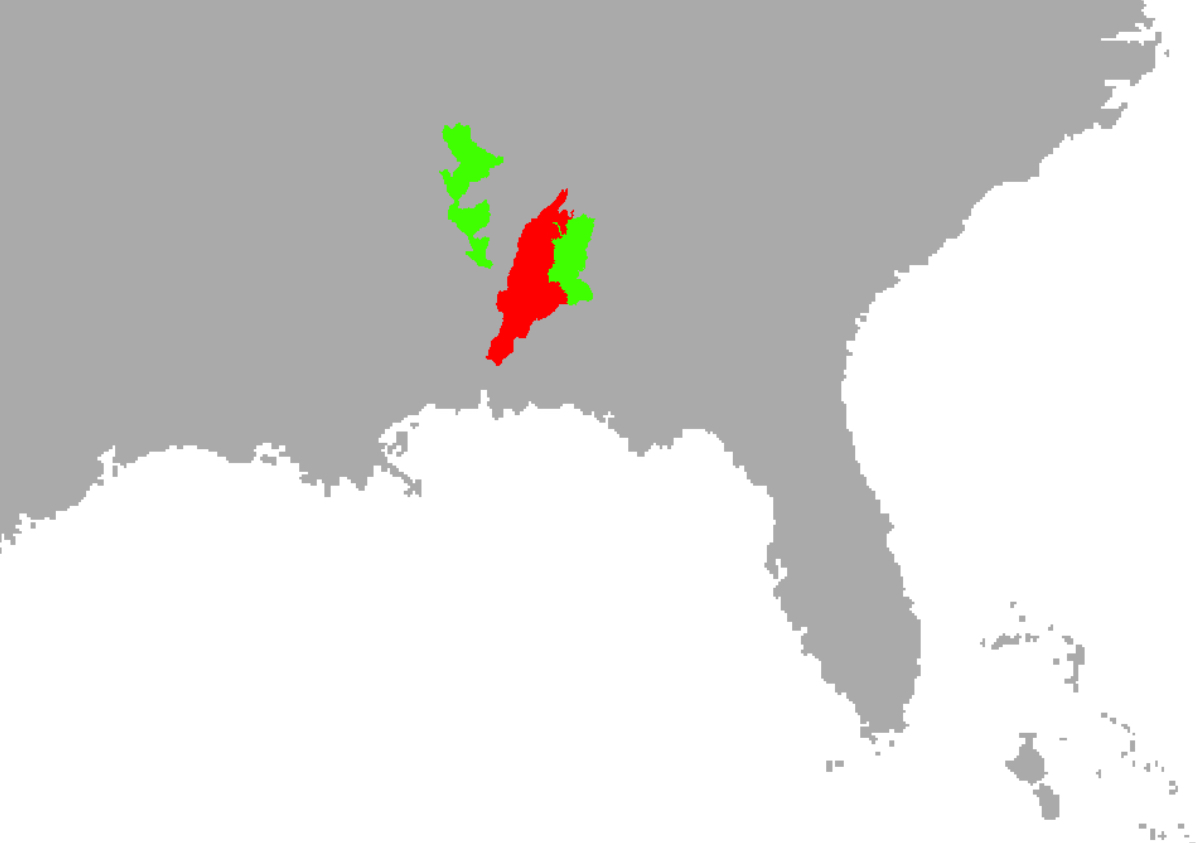
- Red: extant Green: extinct

= Alabama sturgeon =

Species of fish

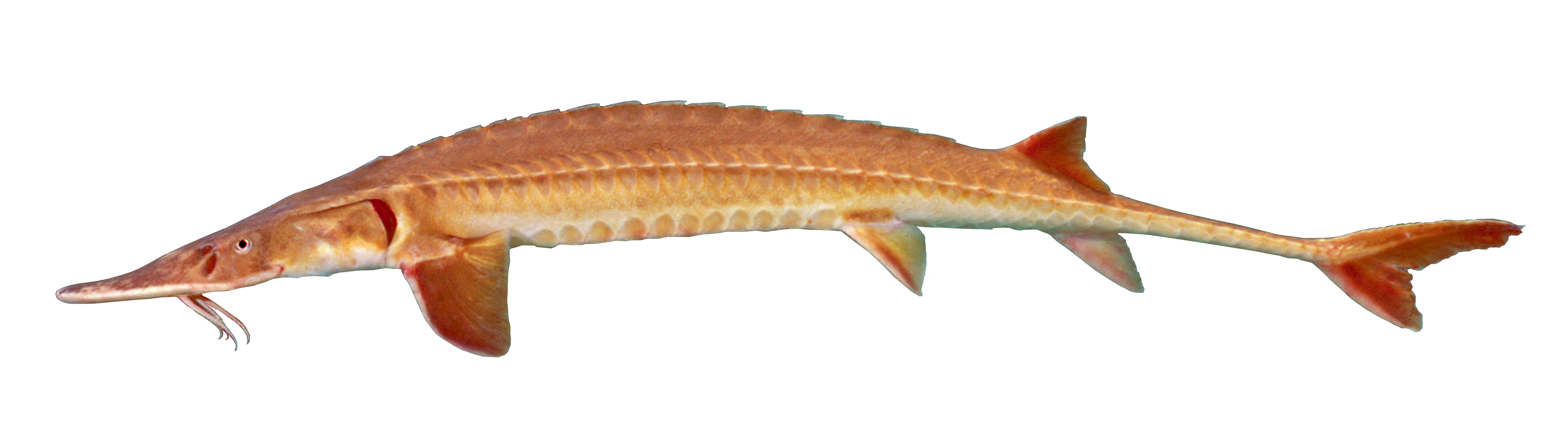
Alabama sturgeon

The Alabama sturgeon (Scaphirhynchus suttkusi) is a species of sturgeon native to the United States of America and now only believed to exist in 130 miles (210 km) of the lower Alabama River. Its historical ranges were believed to be over 1,600 kilometres (990 mi) of river and included the Alabama, Tombigbee, Mobile, Tensaw, Black Warrior, Cahaba, Coosa, and Tallapoosa rivers.

The fish has a distinctive yellowish-orange color, grows to a size of about 30 in (76 cm) long and 2 to 3 lb (0.9–1.4 kg), and is believed to have a lifespan of 12 to 20 years. Biologists have known of the fish since the 1950s or 1960s, but the large diversity of aquatic species in Alabama prevented formal identification until 1991.

== Taxonomy ==
J.D. Williams and G.H. Clemmer identified the Alabama sturgeon as the distinct species Scaphirhynchus suttkusi in 1991. Before its discovery, it was misidentified as a Scaphirhynchus platorynchus, a shovelnose sturgeon, but certain physical differences led to further investigation and the eventual distinction between the two species. Alabama sturgeon have shorter dorsal fin rays and anal fin rays than shovelnose sturgeons, and the placements of these fins vary between the two fish. They also tend to have slightly different colorations and diets. The Alabama sturgeon and the shovelnose sturgeon (S. platorynchus) are closely related and have a sister group in the pallid sturgeon (S. albus) within the monophyletic Scaphirhynchus genus.

== Physical description ==
The Alabama sturgeon has an elongated, flat snout and a shark-like tail. It has a distinct brownish-orange color on its back and fins, golden yellow sides, and a cream-colored belly. Its orbit, the space where the eye is positioned, at 16 mm long is wider than those of other sturgeons.

Alabama sturgeons have fan-shaped gill rakers made of bone or cartilage projecting from their gill arches. They have 5–9 gill rakers on the upper limb of their gill arches and 12–15 on the lower limb.

Alabama sturgeons have more posterior anal and dorsal fins than the shovelnose sturgeon. Their fins are also proportionally shorter than those of the shovelnose.

== Diet ==
The diet of Alabama sturgeon consists of aquatic insects and fish. These opportunistic bottom feeders eat a variety of insects including flies, mayflies, caddisflies, beetles, and dragonflies. Fish make up roughly 1/3 of their diet, including those from the orders Cypriniformes (minnows, shiners, logperch) and Perciformes (darters, bluegills).

Alabama sturgeon stomachs also tend to contain considerable amounts of sand and gravel, which suggests feeding in benthic areas. They possess barbels (whisker-like sensory organs), fringing on the lobes of their lips, and gill rakers (bony or cartilaginous gill projections) to help detect and trap insects and small fish in the bottoms of rivers and streams.

The insects consumed by Alabama sturgeons are found in a variety of habitats, such as on the surfaces of rocks, in swift and slow currents, and in the water column. This demonstrates diversity in its feeding habitats.

== Reproduction ==
Due to their severely endangered status and relatively recent discovery, little is known about the reproductive habits of Alabama sturgeon. However, much can be assumed and approximated due to their close relatedness to other members of the sturgeon (Scaphirhynchus) genus.

Like other sturgeons, male Alabama sturgeons likely mature sexually earlier than females (Kuhajada and Rider 2016). Sexual maturation likely occurs between 5 and 7 years of age, and they likely spawn once every 2–3 years. Female Alabama sturgeons with mature eggs have been found in late March, April, and early May.

One artificial propagation experiment yielded the harvest of 4000 mature eggs from an Alabama sturgeon, but wild sturgeons tend to experience multiple spawning events, so the true number may be higher. A female specimen was found with black eggs 2.4-2.8 mm in diameter while another was found with brown eggs 1.8-2.1 mm in diameter.

Due to their endangered status and small numbers, the exact lifespan of Alabama sturgeons is unknown. Based on related sturgeon species, they are believed to live 12–15 years.

== Protected status controversy ==
The Alabama sturgeon was first proposed for protected status in the early 1990s, although by then the fish was already so rare its survival was uncertain. The sturgeon's protection was opposed by a variety of industries located along Alabama's rivers for the feared economic impact. The opponents' main arguments were that it was already extinct or that it was not a distinct species. In response to this opposition, the U.S. Fish and Wildlife Service ceased efforts to place the fish on the Endangered Species List. Then Ray Vaughan, an environmental lawyer in Montgomery, Alabama, sued the Service and, in 2000, won, requiring Fish and Wildlife to list the fish for protection.

== Recent efforts ==
In 1993, state and federal biologists began a program to help save the Alabama sturgeon through a captive breeding program. Unfortunately, only six fish have been captured since then, all male. The last fish held in captivity died in 2002. The most recent specimen was captured in April 2007. After determining the fish was a male, sperm were collected, a small tracking device implanted, and it was released once it had fully healed. It was hoped that the tagged fish would lead to others of its species, but in a year of tracking to date, this has not happened. In July 2009, lost contact with the tracker.

In May 2008, the Fish and Wildlife Service proposed designating 245 miles (394 km) of the Alabama River and 81 miles (130 km) of the lower portion of its tributary, the Cahaba River, as critical habitat for the fish. Although the rivers are dammed at multiple locations, management of the river flows is expected to continue unchanged.

In August 2013, the Fish and Wildlife Service released the "Recovery Plan for the Alabama Sturgeon (Scaphirhynchus suttkusi)". It includes a plan to establish a captive stock that can produce fingerlings to be released back into the wild and to improve the habitat in the Alabama River through operational changes at Claiborne and Millers Ferry Lock and Dams.

The Alabama Department of Conservation and Natural Resources (ADCNR) continues to sample for Alabama sturgeons. It is predicted that 5–6 reproductively active males and females would need to be captured within the same year to ensure successful propagation.

Studies from 2014 and 2015 indicated that despite the very few sightings over the last decade, the species is still extant. This is due to numerous traces of recent Alabama sturgeon DNA (environmental DNA) found in water samples gathered from the river.

More recent eDNA sampling found Alabama sturgeon DNA in the Alabama, Cahaba, Mobile, and Tombigbee Rivers. During spawning season (April), researchers found a greater number of Alabama sturgeon eDNA detections. There were increased detections in the Tombigbee River during December, which suggests that Alabama sturgeons may be migrating there for the winter.
