= Protoscaphirhynchus =

Protoscaphirhynchus Temporal range: Maastrichtian

Scientific classification
- Kingdom: Animalia
- Phylum: Chordata
- Class: Actinopterygii
- Order: Acipenseriformes
- Family: Acipenseridae
- Genus: †Protoscaphirhynchus; Wilimovsky, 1956
- Species: †P. squamosus

Binomial name
- †Protoscaphirhynchus squamosus Wilimovsky, 1956

Extinct genus of fishes

Protoscaphirhynchus squamosus is an extinct sturgeon from the Late Cretaceous of North America. It is known from a single poorly preserved specimen found in the Maastrichtian aged Hell Creek Formation in Montana. Due to its poor preservational state, it has few diagnostic characters.

== See also ==
- Prehistoric fish
- List of prehistoric bony fish
