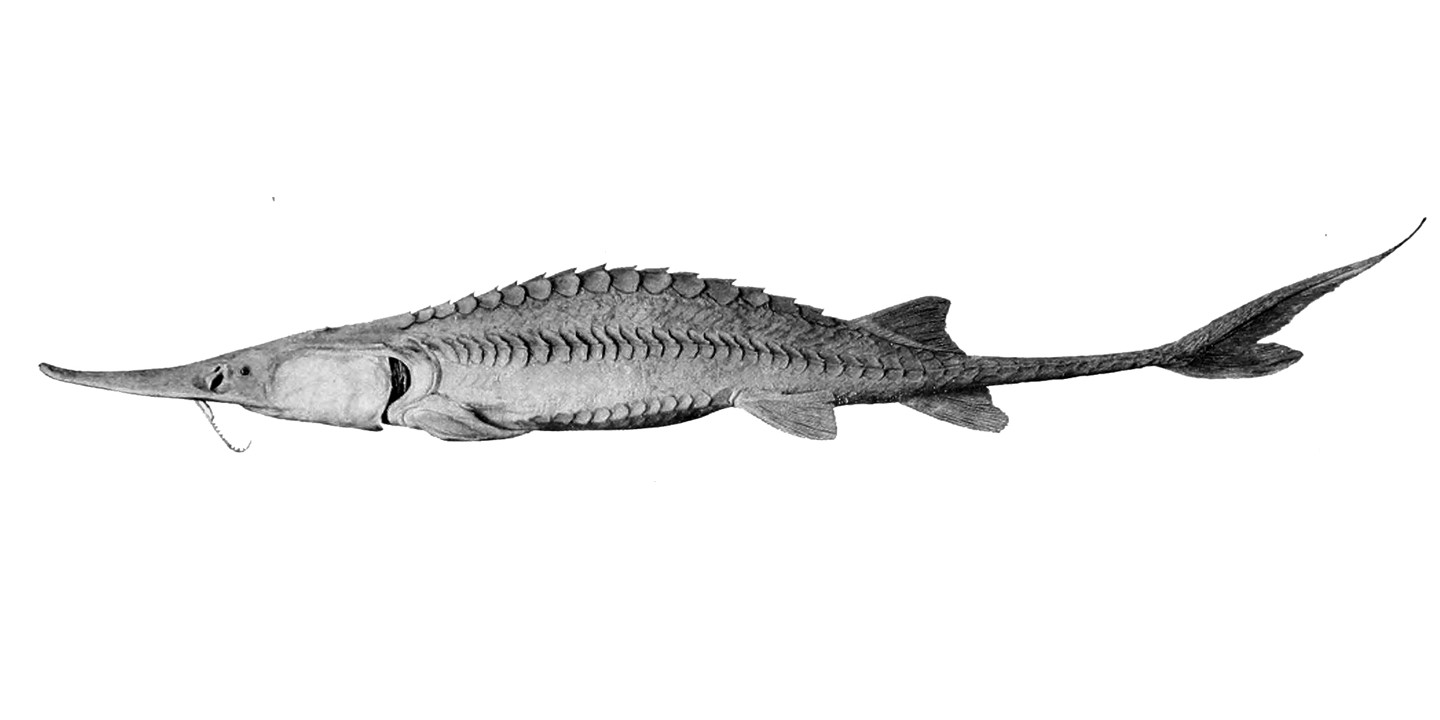
- Scaphirhynchus albus

Scientific classification
- Kingdom: Animalia
- Phylum: Chordata
- Class: Actinopterygii
- Order: Acipenseriformes
- Family: Acipenseridae
- Genus: Scaphirhynchus; Heckel, 1835

Species
- See text
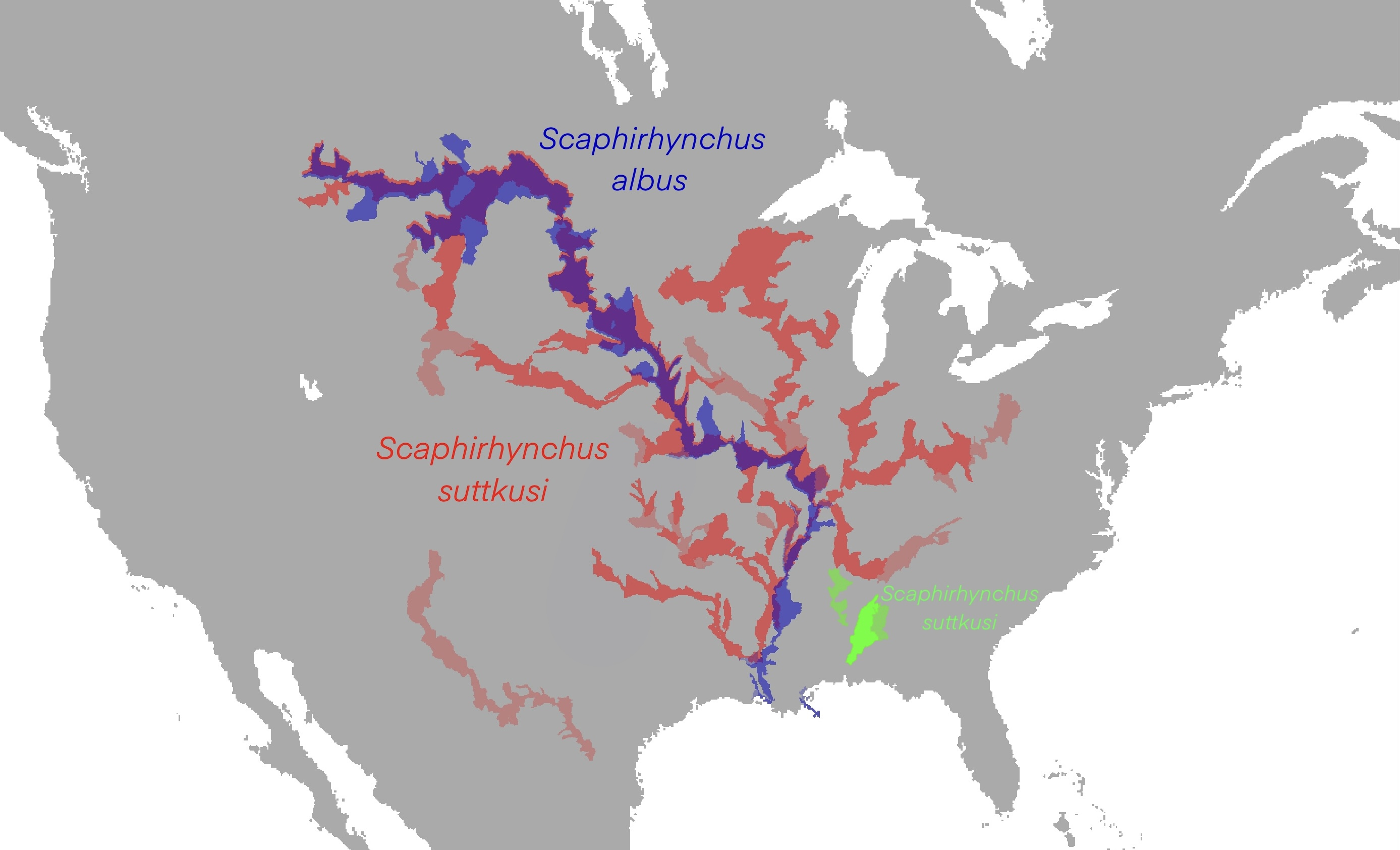

Synonyms
- Scaphirhynchops Gill 1863; Parascaphirhynchus Forbes & Richardson 1905

= Scaphirhynchus =

Genus of fishes

Scaphirhynchus, from Ancient Greek σκάφη (skáphe), meaning "shovel", and ῥύγχος (rhúnkos), meaning "snout", is a genus of sturgeons native to North America. All species in this genus are considered to be threatened with extinction or worse. As of 2023, the pallid sturgeon (S. albus) and the Alabama sturgeon (S. suttkusi) are critically endangered according to the International Union for Conservation of Nature.

The genus name Scaphirhynchus from Ancient Greek σκάφη (skáphe), meaning "shovel", and ῥύγχος (rhúnkos), meaning "snout", referring to their flat, shovel-shaped snout.

== Distribution ==
Member species are found in the Mississippi, Missouri, and Alabama Rivers.

== Species ==
Currently, three species in this genus are recognized:

Image	Species	Common name
	Scaphirhynchus albus (S. A. Forbes & R. E. Richardson, 1905)	pallid sturgeon
	Scaphirhynchus platorynchus (Rafinesque, 1820)	shovelnose sturgeon
	Scaphirhynchus suttkusi J. D. Williams & Clemmer, 1991	Alabama sturgeon
