= Angling records of Europe =

Sports

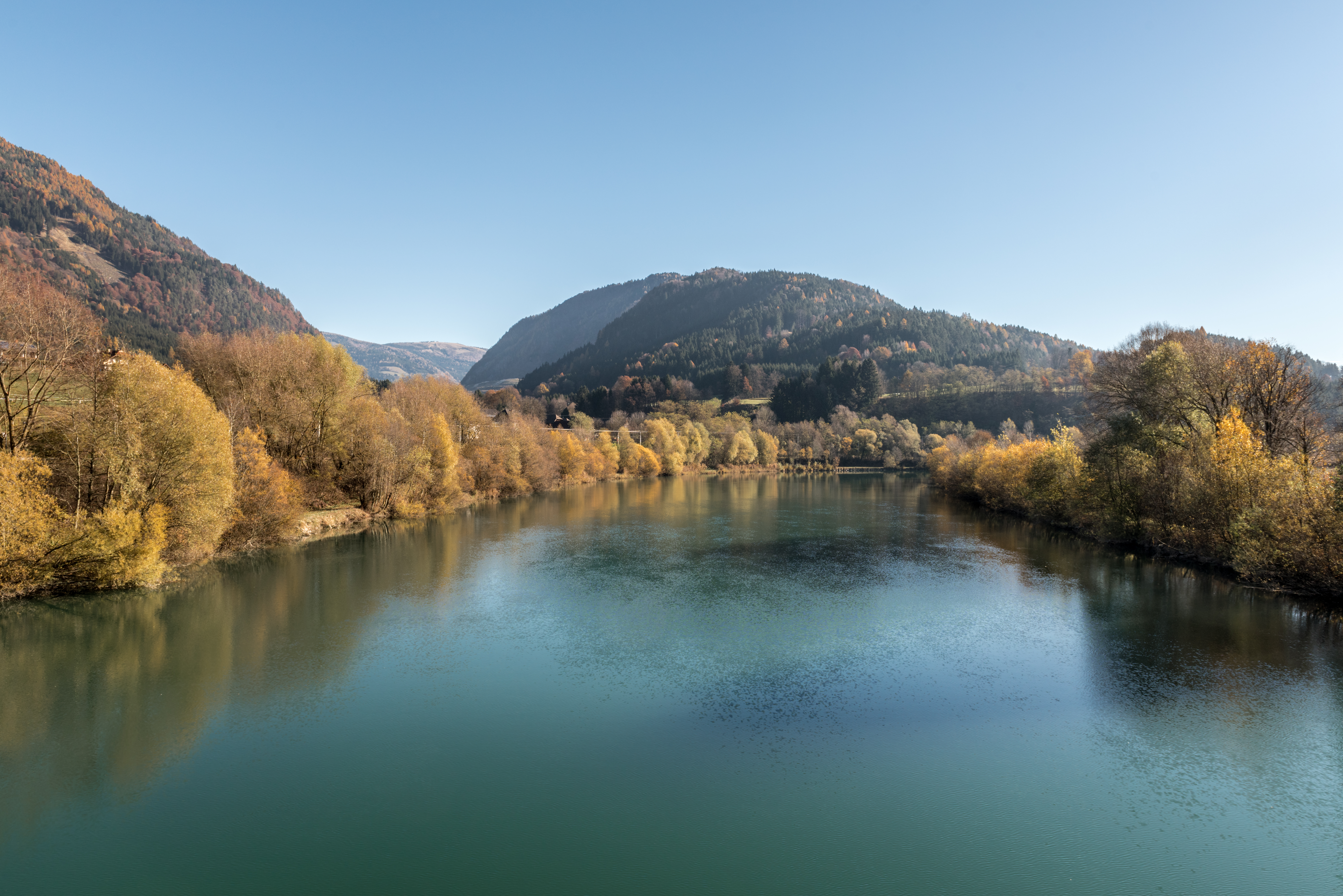
Drava River, Austria. Venue where the 35,1 kg European record Huchen (Hucho hucho) was caught in 2004.

This list is of the heaviest European freshwater fish caught using the traditional angling method of rod and line.

The criteria for inclusion on this list is that the species, weight, date and venue have been published by a recognized publisher with a genuine photograph and a link to that publication is referenced here. The list is intended to include all categories of coarse and game fish caught by sport anglers.

== Current records ==
Image	Species	Weight kg	Weight lb oz	Captor	Date	Water	Country	References / Notes
	Allis Shad - Grand alose / Maifisch (Alosa alosa)	3 kg	7 lb	Mr. Michou	2008	Blavet River	France	
	Asp - Aspe / Aspio / (Leuciscus aspius)	10.3 kg	22 lb 11 oz	Miroslav Šajdák	2008	Vah River, Nosicky Canal	Slovakia	
	European Eel - Aal - Anguille - Anguilla (Anguilla anguilla) Note 1	6.04 kg	13 lb 5 oz	G. Cadora	1991	Niepkuhle	Germany	
	Silver Bream - Güster / Björkna / Brème bordelière - Blicca (Blicca bjoerkna)	1.48 kg	3 lb 4 oz	Ulf Ahlinder	2010	Dal River	Sweden	
	Silver Bream - Güster / Björkna / Brème bordelière - Blicca (Blicca bjoerkna)	1.474 kg	3 lb 4 oz	Gareth Evans	21 May 2012	Mill Farm Fishery, Bury, West Sussex	England	
	Bream / Brachse / Braxen / Brème / Abramide (Abramis brama)	10.3 kg	22 lb 11 oz	Scot Crook	17 April 2012	Ferry Lagoon, Fen Drayton Lakes, Cambridgeshire,	England	
	Common Barbel - Barbe (Barbus barbus)	9.59 kg	21 lb 2 oz	Colin Smithson	7 November 2019	Sussex River, Sussex	England	
	Common Iberian Barbel - Barbo Común ibérico (Luciobarbus bocagei)	11.5 kg	26 lb 6 oz	Mr. Felix	2007	Lagunas de Ruidera, Guadiana river	Spain	
	Comizo Barbel - Comizo (Luciobarbus comizo)	16.8 kg	37 lb	David Aldana	1 March 2017	Lago Penarolla	Spain	
	Andalusian Barbel - Barbo andaluz andalusische Barbe - barbeau andalouse (Luciobarbus sclateri)	4.1 kg	9 lb 1 oz	Peter Staggs Netherlands	2000	Las Tortugas Lake, Nueva Andalucía	Spain	
	Burbot - Quappe - Lake - Barbotte - Bottatrice (Lota lota)	8.5 kg	18 lb 12 oz	Margit Agren	22 Oct 1996	Angenmanelren	Sweden	
	Chub - Döbel / Färna / Chevaine / Cavedano (Squalius cephalus)	5.72 kg	12 lb 10 oz	Franz Wutte	1991	Gurk River	Austria	
	Crucian carp - Karausche / Carrassin / Carassio (Carassius carassius)	3.64 kg	8 lb	B. Spörlein	2005	Lake at Strössendorf	Germany	
	Goldfish - Goudvis / Poisson rouge / Carassio (Carassius auratus)	3.2 kg	7 lb 1 oz	Brian Jensen	2006	Lake in Denmark TBC	Denmark	
	Bighead Carp - Cardona / Tolstolobec pestrý / Grootkopkarper / carpa testa grossa (Hypophthalmichthys nobilis)	77.5 kg	170 lb 14 oz	Diem János	14 July 2009	Lake Tisza (hu:Tisza-tó), (Kisköre Reservoir)	Hungary	
	Carp - karpfen / Karpe / Carpe / Carpa - Common, Mirror, Leather (Cyprinus carpio)	52 kg	114 lb 10 oz	Ash Hegarty England	5 Nov 2026	Euro Aqua Fishery, Nemesvita	Hungary	
	Silver Carp - Carpe d'argent / srebrny karp / zilveren/ Silberkarpfen (Hypophthalmichthys molitrix)	41.5 kg	91 lb 8 oz	Werner Schwingenschlögl	2018	Baggersee Schweitzer Grube	Austria	
	Dace - Hasel / Stäm / Leuscico comune (Leuciscus leuciscus)	0.76 kg	1 lb 11 oz	Mario Grill	2007	Attersee	Austria	
	Ide or Orfe Aland / L'ide. (Leuciscus idus)	5.5 kg	12 lb 2 oz	V. Korotkovs	1989	Lubāns	Latvia	
	Grass Carp - Graskarpfen / Amur bílý / Graskarper (Ctenopharyngodon idella)	40.5 kg	89 lb 5 oz	Diem Szeles Sándor	21 Aug 1993	River Danube	Hungary	
	Grayling - Äsche - Ombre - Temolo (Thymallus thymallus)	3.175 kg	7 lb	H. Baumann	1 May 1975	Danube	Germany	
	Huchen (Danube salmon) - Donaulachs -salmón del Danubio (Hucho hucho) Note 2	35,1 kg	77 lb 6 oz	Edwin Buchacher	2004	Drava River	Austria	
	Mullet - Thin-Lipped Grey / Meeräsche / mulle / triglia (Liza ramada)	3.45 kg	7 lb 9oz	Shaun Sillett	20 August 2012	Oulton Broad, Lowestoft, Suffolk	England	
	Common Nase - Nose / nasus (Chondrostoma nasus)	3.4 kg	7 lb 8oz	Dieter Lindemann	10 Feb 2006	Rhine	Germany	
	Perch - (Fluß) Barsch / Abborre / Perche / Persico (Perca fluviatilis)	3.75 kg	8 lb 4 oz	Stephan Gockel	2010	Meuse River	Netherlands	
	Pike - Hecht / Gädda / Brochet / Luccio (Esox lucius)	26.7 kg	58 lb 14 oz	Lukas Matejka	October 2019	Lake in Bohemia	Czech Republic	
	Prussian carp - Silver or Gibel karpfen / Karpe / Carpe / Carpa (Carassius gibelio)	4.84 kg	10 lb 11 oz	Jan Zablocki	2009	Kocher River, Germany	Germany	
	Roach - Rotauge / Mört / Gardon / rutilo (Rutilus rutilus)	2.625 kg	5 lb 12 oz	M. Müller	1981	Weser	Germany	
	Black Sea roach - Perlfisch / Pärlfisk (Rutilus meidingeri)	6.57 kg	14 lb 8 oz	Cosimo Radler	2015	Wolfgangsee	Austria	
	Cactus roach - Neitsisärg (Rutilus virgo)	3.34 kg	7 lb 6 oz	Peter Sagl	2021	Danube River	Austria	
	Danube Roach - Frauennerfling / Gardon galant / pigo (Rutilus pigus)	2.56 kg	5 lb 10 oz	Jurgen Perl	3 July 2016	Danube River, Bavaria	Germany	
	Rudd - Rotfeder / Sarv / Gardon Rouge / Scardola (pinne rosse) (Scardinius erythrophthalmus)	2.7 kg	5 lb 15 oz	S.Nagel	1976	Weser	Germany	
	Tench - Barn / Sutare / Tanche / Tinca (Tinca tinca)	6.899 kg	15 lb 3 oz 6 dr	Darren Ward	June 2001	Sheepwalk big pit, Shepperton, Middlesex	England	
	Atlantic Salmon - Atlantischer Lachs / Lax / Saumon / Salmone (Salmo salar)	35.89 kg	79 lb 2 oz	Henrik Henriksen	1 Jan 1928	Tana River	Norway	(total weight only estimated)
	Wels Catfish Europäischer Wels / Mal / Silure glane / Siluro (Silurus glanis)	134.97 kg	297 lb 9 oz	Attila Zsedely Hungary	11 March 2010	River Po	Italy	
	Siberian sturgeon - Sibirischer Stör / Esturión siberiano / Esturgeon sibérien / Storione siberiano (Acipenser baerii) Note 2	32 kg	70 lb 8 oz	catcher ?	2012	Fishing paradise, Pielachtal	Austria	
	Adriatic sturgeon - Adriastör / Adriatisk stör / Esturgeon de l'Adriatique / Storione (Acipenser naccarii) Note 1	19 kg	41 lb 14 oz	Josef Hotzl	2012	Fishing paradise, Pielachtal	Austria	
	Sterlet - Kleiner Stör / Sterlett / Esturgeon du Danube / Storione sterleto (Acipenser ruthenus)	7.85 kg	17 lb 5 oz	Gábor Burián-Kozma	2002	River Danube	Hungary	
	European sturgeon - Europäische Stör / Esturgeon d'Europe / Sturys (Acipenser sturio) Note 1	176 kg	388 lb	Alec Allen	1932	River Towy, Nantgaredig, Carmarthenshire	Wales	
	Trout, Brown - Seeforelle / Truite De Lac / Trota Di Lago / Insjööring (Salmo trutta)	17 kg	37 lb 8 oz	Kurt Stenlund	16 Oct 1991	Storsjön, Gällivare kom Lappland	Sweden	
	Vendace - Kleine Maräne / Corégone blanc / Muikku (Coregonus albula)	0.55 kg	1 lb 3 oz	unknown	1 Oct 2004	Inarijärvi	Finland	
	Vimba - Zährte / Vimma / Vimbe (Vimba vimba)	2.325 kg	5 lb 2 oz	J. Müller	21 May 1975	Weser	Germany	
	Whitefish - Renke / Sik / Siika (Coregonus lavaretus)	7.08 kg	15 lb 10 oz	Markku Taponen	15 July 2000	Sodankylä	Finland	
	Zander - European Pikeperch / Gös / Sander / Luccioperca (Sander lucioperca)	18.7 kg	41 lb 4 oz	Friedrich Kraus	1990	Danube	Austria	
	Ziege - Rasoir / Garda / Ožka (žuvis) (Pelecus cultratus)	0.91 kg	2 lb	Markku Pesonen	2008	Saimaar Lake	Finland	
	Zingel - Tsingeli / Magyar bucó / Czop czarny (Zingel zingel)	1.23 kg	2 lb 11 oz	Gregor Käfer	2011	River Danube	Austria	
	Blue Bream - Zope (Ballerus ballerus)	2.2 kg	4 lb 14 oz	Alexander Schulz	2022	Elbe	Germany	

== Previous records ==
Image	Species	Weight kg	Weight lb oz	Captor	Date	Water	Country	References / Notes
	Barbel (Barbus barbus)	9.58 kg	21 lb 1 oz	Grahame King	22 April 2006	Great Ouse, Adam's Mill, Gayhurst, Buckinghamshire	England	
	Carp - karpfen / Karpe / Carpe / Carpa - Common, Mirror, Leather (Cyprinus carpio)	51.2 kg	112 lb 14 oz	Michel Schoenmakers Netherlands	23 Nov 2018	Euro Aqua Fishery, Nemesvita	Hungary	
	Carp - karpfen / Karpe / Carpe / Carpa - Common, Mirror, Leather (Cyprinus carpio)	49 kg	108 lb	Marco Eichner Austria	21 Oct 2017	Euro Aqua Fishery, Nemesvita	Hungary	
	Carp - karpfen / Karpe / Carpe / Carpa - Common, Mirror, Leather (Cyprinus carpio)	48 kg	105 lb 13 oz	Thomas Krist Czech Republic	May 2015	Euro Aqua Fishery, Nemesvita	Hungary	
	Carp - karpfen / Karpe / Carpe / Carpa - Common, Mirror, Leather (Cyprinus carpio)	45.93 kg	101 lb 4 oz	Roman Hanke Austria	2 June 2012	Euro Aqua Fishery, Nemesvita	Hungary	
	Carp - karpfen / Karpe / Carpe / Carpa - Common, Mirror, Leather (Cyprinus carpio)	45.49 kg	100 lb 8 oz	Colin Smith England	April 2013	Etang La Saussaie, Champagne (province)	France	
	Carp - karpfen / Karpe / Carpe / Carpa - Common, Mirror, Leather (Cyprinus carpio)	44.91 kg	99 lb	Ambrose Smith England	5 June 2010	Les Graviers, Dijon	France	
	Carp - karpfen / Karpe / Carpe / Carpa - Common, Mirror, Leather (Cyprinus carpio)	42.64 kg	94 lb	Martin Locke England	6 January 2010	Rainbow lake, Bordeaux	France	
	Carp - karpfen / Karpe / Carpe / Carpa - Common, Mirror, Leather (Cyprinus carpio)	41.28 kg	91 lb	Nick Greenall England	April 2009	Les Graviers, Dijon	France	
	Carp - karpfen / Karpe / Carpe / Carpa - Common, Mirror, Leather (Cyprinus carpio)	41.28 kg	91 lb	Andre Komornicki England	April 2009	Les Graviers, Dijon	France	
	Carp - karpfen / Karpe / Carpe / Carpa - Common, Mirror, Leather (Cyprinus carpio)	40.09 kg	88 lb 6 oz	Graham Slaughter England	22 May 2007	Rainbow lake, Bordeaux	France	
	Pike - Hecht / Gädda / Brochet / Luccio (Esox lucius)	25.3 kg	55 lb 12 oz	Petar Filipov	January 2019	5 hectare Lake Bulgaria	Bulgaria	
	Pike - Hecht / Gädda / Brochet / Luccio (Esox lucius)	25 kg	55 lb 1 oz	Lothar Louis	16 October 1986	Lake of Grefeern, Buhl	Germany	
	Wels Catfish - Europäischer Wels / Mal / Silure glane / Siluro (Silurus glanis)	113.5 kg	250 lb 3 oz	Roberto Godi	5 Feb 2010	River Po, Mantua, Lombardy	Italy	
	Wels Catfish - Europäischer Wels / Mal / Silure glane / Siluro (Silurus glanis)	112 kg	246 lb 14 oz	Christophe Dubreuil France	September 2009	River Ebro, Mequinenza, Province of Zaragoza	Spain	
	Wels Catfish - Europäischer Wels / Mal / Silure glane / Siluro (Silurus glanis)	110 kg	242 lb 5 oz	Jakub Vagner Germany	5 February 2009	River Po	Italy	

== See also ==
Angling records in the UK (United Kingdom)

== Notes ==
Note 1 - European eel (Anguilla anguilla), Adriatic sturgeon (Acipenser naccarii) and European sturgeon (Acipenser sturio) are listed as Critically Endangered species (IUCN) status by the International Union for Conservation of Nature (IUCN). Any of these fish caught, must be photographed, then returned to the water immediately.

Note 2 - Siberian Sturgeon (Acipenser baerii) and Huchen (Danube salmon) (Hucho hucho)are listed as Endangered species (IUCN) status by the International Union for Conservation of Nature (IUCN). Any of these fish caught, must be photographed, then returned to the water immediately.
