= Caucasian sturgeon =

Scientific classification
- Kingdom: Animalia
- Phylum: Chordata
- Class: Actinopterygii
- Order: Acipenseriformes
- Family: Acipenseridae
- Genus: Huso
- Species: H. colchicus

Binomial name
- Huso colchicus (Marty, 1940)

Synonyms
- Acipenser gueldenstaedtii colchica Marti, 1940; Acipenser colchicus

Species of fish

The Caucasian sturgeon or Colchis sturgeon (Huso colchicus) is a highly endangered species of sturgeon native to the eastern Europe and western Asia, where it is found in the southeastern Black Sea & associated river basins, as well as the lower Danube River. It is named after the historic region of Colchis.

It was long considered a subspecies of the Russian sturgeon (H. gueldenstaedtii) or the Persian sturgeon (H. persicus), which themselves were previously placed in the genus Acipenser. However, recent phylogenetic studies have reclassified both into Huso, and have affirmed the distinctiveness of the Caucasian sturgeon from both of these species. Phylogenetic evidence indicates that the Caucasian sturgeon is most closely related to the Adriatic sturgeon (H. naccarii). It cannot be properly differentiated from the Russian sturgeon by morphology alone, and very little has been studied about its phylogenetics.

It is known from Romania, Bulgaria, Turkey, and Georgia. It is found in the Danube, Rioni, Enguri, Tskhenistskali, Coruh, Yeşilırmak, Kızılırmak and Sakarya river basins. The primary remaining spawning area for the species is the Rioni River of Georgia. Even in this habitat, it is known to hybridize with the stellate sturgeon (Huso stellatus), although offspring are infertile. Spawning populations in the Danube, if they still exist, are thought to be very small. The Colchic Rainforests and Wetlands are an important refuge for the species. The species has been successfully raised in captivity in Georgia for both conservation purposes and caviar production, with nearly 600 specimens being bred as of 2022.
