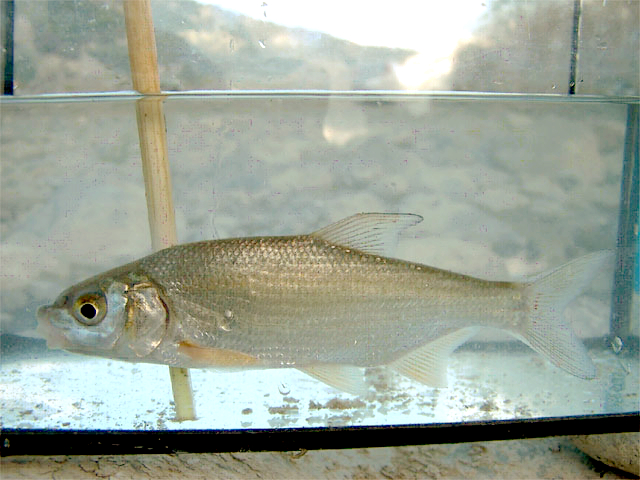

Conservation status
- Least Concern (IUCN 3.1)

Scientific classification
- Kingdom: Animalia
- Phylum: Chordata
- Class: Actinopterygii
- Division: Teleostei
- Order: Cypriniformes
- Family: Leuciscidae
- Subfamily: Leuciscinae
- Genus: Vimba
- Species: V. melanops

Binomial name
- Vimba melanops (Heckel, 1837)

Synonyms
- Abramis melanops Heckel, 1837

= Macedonian vimba =

Species of fish

The Macedonian vimba (Vimba melanops) or malamída, is a species of freshwater ray-finned fish belonging to the family Leuciscidae, which includes the daces, Eurasian minnows and related species. This fish is endemic to the southern Balkans.

== Taxonomy ==
The Macedonina vimba was first formally described as Abramis melanops in 1837 by the Austrian ichthyologist Johann Jakob Heckel with its type locality given as the Maritza River in eastern Rumelia, in modern Bulgaria. This species is now classified in the genus Vimba which was proposed as a genus by the Austrian zoologist Leopold Fitzinger in 1873 and is classified within the subfamily Leuciscinae in the Family Leuciscidae.

== Etymology ==
The Macedonian vimba belongs to the genus Vimba, a name which Fitzinger used tautonymously for Cyprinus vimba which is thought to be derived from the Swedish vernacular name vimma for Vimba vimba. The specific name, melanops, mean "black face" or "black look", which alludes to the dark colouration of this fish.

== Description ==
The Macedonian vimba is told apart from its Balkan relatives by having between 15 and 18 1/2 branched rays in its anal fin; there is no keel on the back to the rear of the base of the dorsal fin. The breeding males develop a broad black band along the middle of the flank with a white cheek and belly. This species has a maximum total length of 32 cm (13 in).

== Distribution and habitat ==
The Macedonian vimba is found in the Southern Balkans in the catchment of the Pineios east to the Evros drainage. It has been recorded in Macedonia, Greece, Bulgaria, Serbia and East Thrace. It is a species found in deep low-lying reaches of rivers and in lakes.

== Sources ==
- Froese, Rainer; Pauly, Daniel (eds.). "Vimba melanops". FishBase.
