= Sevruga caviar =

Eggs from starry sturgeon

Sevruga caviar is one of the highest priced varieties of caviar, eclipsed in cost only by the Beluga and Ossetra varieties. It is harvested from a variety of critically endangered sturgeon fish species that are known for their small, grey eggs. In eastern Europe, it is harvested from the stellate sturgeon (Acipenser stellatus), the sterlet sturgeon (Acipenser ruthenus) and the Siberian sturgeon (Acipenser baerii), which are native to the Caspian Sea and the surrounding rivers. Because the stellate sturgeon was once the most common and fastest to reproduce, this made Sevruga caviar the most commonly found of the sturgeon caviars, and the most inexpensive of the three main types of sturgeon caviar – Beluga, Osetra and Sevruga.

Sevruga is the smallest of the caviar-producing sturgeons. It can grow as far as 150 lbs. in weight and 7 feet in length. It is native to the Black, Azov, Caspian and Aegean Sea basins although it has been extirpated throughout most of its range. It is calculated that about half the caviar production comes from Sevruga. Sevruga caviar eggs are a pearlescent grey, and smaller in size than other sturgeon. The flavor is more pronounced than other varieties, often described as saltier, but it can vary depending on the origin of the fish. The caviar is packaged and sold in red tins.

== Other types ==
A rare type of caviar known as Imperial Caviar, from the sterlet sturgeon (Acipenser ruthenus), a now nearly extinct species of sturgeon from the Caspian Sea, is sometimes incorrectly labeled as Sevruga, as well as the even rarer Golden Caviar from the albino sterlet, the caviar being yellow in color. "Pressed sevruga caviar" can also be found, made of a blend of Osetra and Sevruga caviar that has been heated in a saline solution.
