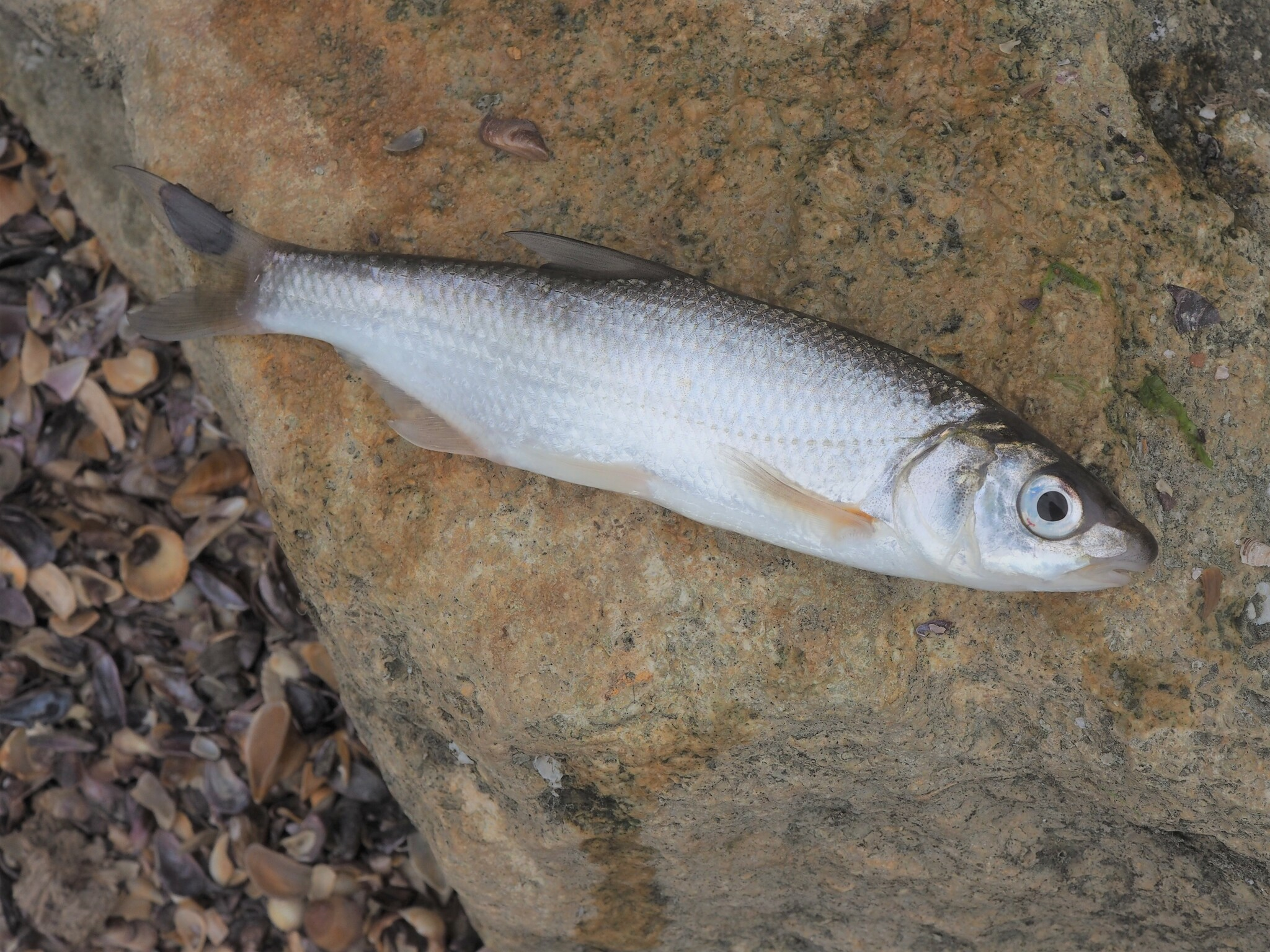

Conservation status
- Least Concern (IUCN 3.1)

Scientific classification
- Kingdom: Animalia
- Phylum: Chordata
- Class: Actinopterygii
- Order: Cypriniformes
- Family: Leuciscidae
- Genus: Vimba
- Species: V. persa

Binomial name
- Vimba persa (Pallas, 1814)

Synonyms
- Cyprinus persa Pallas, 1814

= Caspian vimba =

Species of fish

The Caspian vimba (Vimba persa) is a species of freshwater ray-finned fish belonging to the family Leuciscidae, which includes the daces, Eurasian minnows and related species. This species is endemic to the Caspian Sea basin in Russia, Azerbaijan and Iran.
