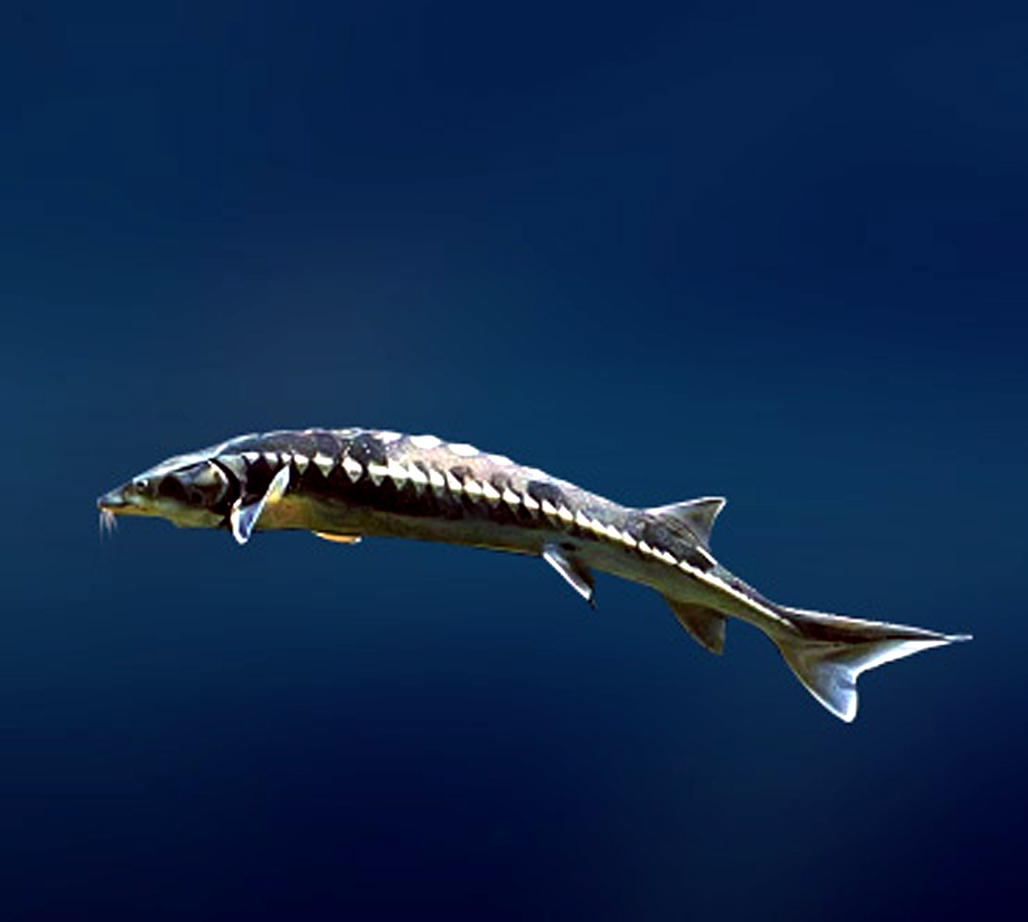

Conservation status
- Critically Endangered (IUCN 3.1)
- CITES Appendix II (CITES)

Scientific classification
- Kingdom: Animalia
- Phylum: Chordata
- Class: Actinopterygii
- Order: Acipenseriformes
- Family: Acipenseridae
- Genus: Huso
- Species: H. nudiventris

Binomial name
- Huso nudiventris (Lovetsky, 1828)

Synonyms
- Acipenser schypus Güldenstädt 1772 ex Bonnaterre 1788; Acipenser turritus Fitzinger & Heckel 1836; Acipenser glaber Fitzinger 1836; Lioniscus glaber (Fitzinger 1836); Acipenser nudiventris derjavini Borzenko 1950; Acipenser shipus Lovetzky 1834 non Güldenstädt 1772; Euacipenser nudiventris (Lovetsky 1828)

= Bastard sturgeon =

Ship sturgeon

Species of fish

The bastard sturgeon, also known as the fringebarbel sturgeon, ship sturgeon, spiny sturgeon, or thorn sturgeon (Huso nudiventris), is a species of fish in the family Acipenseridae. These fish are typically found along the benthos of shallower waters near shorelines or estuaries.

== Taxonomy ==
Prior to 2025, it was placed in the genus Acipenser, but this placement was found to be paraphyletic, and it is more accurately placed in the genus Huso.

== Feeding ==
Huso nudiventris typically feed on other animals near the benthos including: insect larvae, mollusks, crustaceans, and other smaller fish.

== Reproduction ==
Huso nudiventris are usually anadromous—meaning they live in saltwater and travel to freshwaters to deposit eggs—but some can spend their entire life cycle in freshwater. Because they travel from saltwater to freshwater to spawn, they often live nearby estuaries. Migration to freshwaters for deposition of eggs occurs during spring between the months of March and May, and fall between October and November. On average, female bastard sturgeon produce between 200,000 and 300,000 eggs over the course of their lifetime. The young Huso nudiventris can live in freshwater for years following birth prior to traveling to the sea, though many migrate to the sea soon after birth. The average time between birth of subsequent Huso nudiventris is around 15 years; variation in generation time of this species is somewhat dependent on human fishing patterns and whether the species is thriving in its environment.

== Conservation status ==
Formerly abundant in the Black, Aral and Caspian seas, its range is now primarily limited to the Ural River (in Russia and Kazakhstan), with possible relict populations in the Rioni River in Georgia and the Safid Rud in Iran. One of the most established populations is one in Lake Balkhash in Kazakhstan, well outside its natural range, where they were introduced in the 1930s for commercial purposes. A decline in the abundance of Huso nudiventris has been reported due to overfishing and damming, which have led to limitations placed on fishing for bastard sturgeon in areas such as the Ural River. In order to alleviate concerns with rapidly decreasing Huso nudiventris, an effort was made to raise these fish in captivity before releasing them back into rivers they once inhabited.

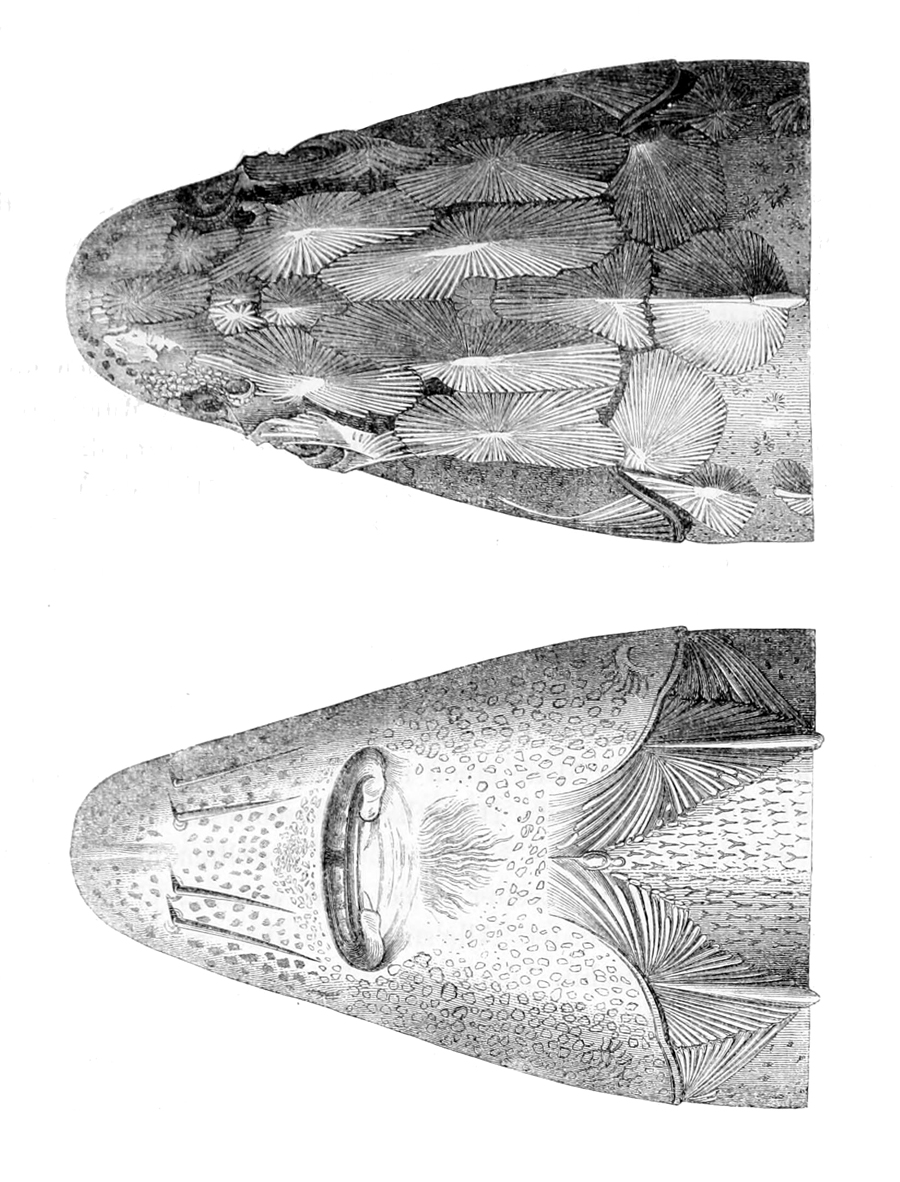
Head
