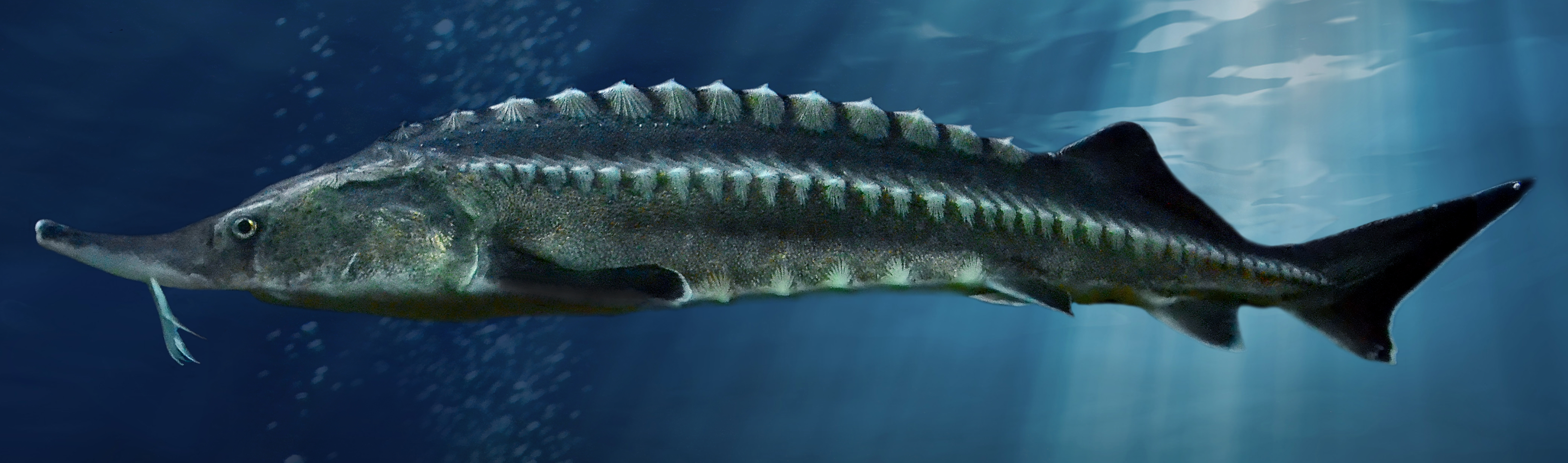
- Beluga sturgeon
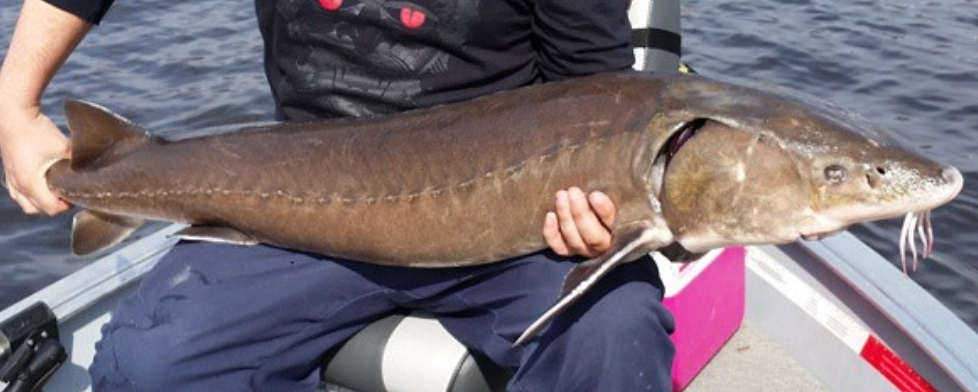
- Lake sturgeon (H. fulvescens), one of two North American species

Scientific classification
- Kingdom: Animalia
- Phylum: Chordata
- Class: Actinopterygii
- Order: Acipenseriformes
- Family: Acipenseridae
- Genus: Huso; Lovetsky, 1834

Type species
- Huso huso Linnaeus, 1758

Species
- See text

Synonyms
- List: Acipenser (Gladostomus) Holly 1936; Acipenser (Lioniscus) (Heckel & Fitzinger 1836) Bonaparte 1846; Acipenser (Shipa) Brandt 1869; Antacea Bory de St. Vincent 1822 non Rafinesque 1815; Antaceus Heckel ex Fitzinger & Heckel 1836 non Bonaparte 1846; Ellops Gistl 1848 non Mining 1832; Gladostomus Holly, 1936; Helops Brandt & Ratzeburg 1833 non Agassiz 1846 non Browne 1789 non Fabricius 1775 non Müller 1835; Husones Brandt & Ratzeburg, 1833; Ichthyocolla Garsault, 1764; Lioniscus Heckel & Fitzinger 1836; Sterletus (Rafinesque 1820) Brandt & Ratzeburg 1833; Sterleta Güldenstädt 1772

= Huso =

Huso Temporal range: Early Pliocene to Present

Genus of fishes

Huso is a genus of sturgeons from eastern Europe, Asia, and eastern North America. The genus name is derived from hūso, the Old High German and Medieval Latin word for "sturgeon", which is also ancestral to Hausen, the German name for the beluga sturgeon.

== Taxonomy ==
Until 2025, Huso was defined as containing two giant-sized species: the beluga from western Eurasia, and the kaluga from East Asia. However, this placement was long found to be polyphyletic, with the kaluga grouping with other East Asian sturgeon species. In contrast, a large number of Eurasian and two North American species were found to form a large clade with H. huso. In addition, the latter clade was found to be more closely related to the morphologically unusual Pseudoscaphirhynchus than to any other sturgeon clade.

In 2025, this taxonomic conundrum was resolved by reclassifying the kaluga and other Pacific sturgeons into Sinosturio, while placing those species more closely related to H. huso into Huso itself. Huso is now the most speciose sturgeon genus, although all members of it are highly endangered.

The following species are placed in this genus:

- Huso baerii (J. F. Brandt, 1869) (Siberian sturgeon)
- Huso colchicus (Marty, 1940) (Caucasian sturgeon)
- Huso gueldenstaedtii (J. F. Brandt & Ratzeburg, 1833) (Russian sturgeon)
- Huso huso (Linnaeus, 1758) (beluga)
- Huso naccarii (Bonaparte, 1836) (Adriatic sturgeon)
- Huso nudiventris (Lovetsky, 1828) (fringebarbel sturgeon)
- Huso persicus (Borodin, 1897) (Persian sturgeon)
- Huso ruthenus (Linnaeus, 1758) (sterlet)
- Huso stellatus (Pallas, 1771) (starry sturgeon)
