= Vimba tenella =

Scientific classification
- Kingdom: Animalia
- Phylum: Chordata
- Class: Actinopterygii
- Order: Cypriniformes
- Family: Leuciscidae
- Genus: Vimba
- Species: V. tenella

Binomial name
- Vimba tenella (Nordmann, 1840)

Synonyms
- Abramis tenellus Nordmann, 1840

Species of fish

Vimba tenella is a species of freshwater ray-finned fish belonging to the family Leuciscidae, which includes the daces, Eurasian minnows and related species. This species is found in the drainage basin of the Black Sea.
