= Vimba mirabilis =

Conservation status
- Least Concern (IUCN 3.1)

Scientific classification
- Kingdom: Animalia
- Phylum: Chordata
- Class: Actinopterygii
- Order: Cypriniformes
- Family: Leuciscidae
- Subfamily: Leuciscinae
- Genus: Vimba
- Species: V. mirabilis

Binomial name
- Vimba mirabilis (Ladiges, 1960)

Synonyms
- Acanthobrama mirabilis Ladiges, 1960

Species of fish

Vimba mirabilis, the Menderes vimba or Menderes bream, is a species of freshwater ray-finned fish belonging to the family Leuciscidae, which includes the daces, Eurasian minnows and related species. It is endemic to Turkey, specifically around Büyük Menderes River. It is still abundant in reservoirs and therefore considered as of least concern for conservation measures.
