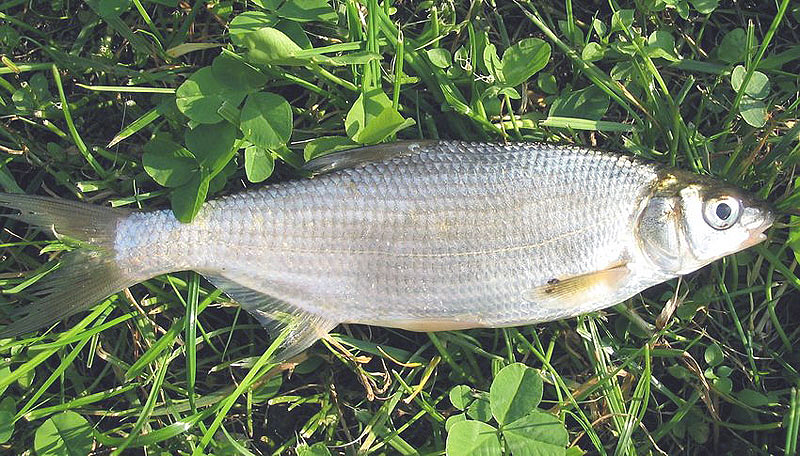
- Vimba vimba

Scientific classification
- Domain: Eukaryota
- Kingdom: Animalia
- Phylum: Chordata
- Class: Actinopterygii
- Order: Cypriniformes
- Family: Leuciscidae
- Subfamily: Leuciscinae
- Genus: Vimba; Fitzinger, 1873

Type species
- Cyprinus vimba Linnaeus, 1758

Synonyms
- Leucabramis Smitt, 1895

= Vimba =

Genus of fishes

Vimba is a genus of freshwater ray-finned fishes belonging to the family Leuciscidae, which includes daces, Eurasian minnows and related fishes. The fishes in this genus are found in Europe and western Asia.

Vimba are found in brackish waters of estuaries, muddy streams, rivers, ponds, and subalpine lakes.

== Species ==
Vimba contains the following species:

- Vimba melanops (Heckel, 1837) (Macedonian vimba)
- Vimba mirabilis (Ladiges, 1960) (Menderes vimba)
- Vimba persa (Pallas,1814) (Caspian vimba)
- Vimba tenella (Nordmann, 1840)
- Vimba vimba (Linnaeus, 1758) (Vimba bream)
