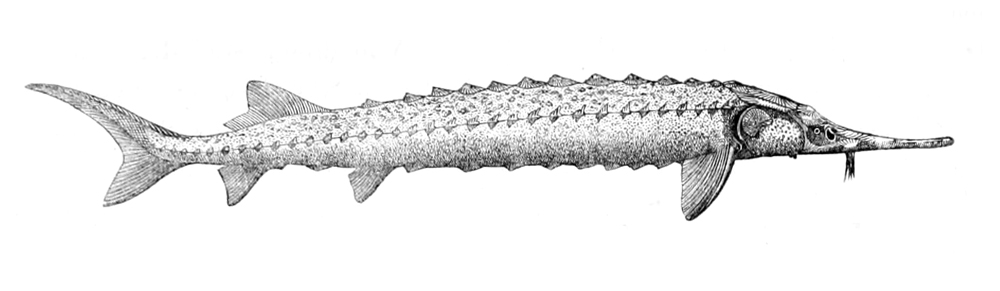
- Huso stellatus

Conservation status
- Critically Endangered (IUCN 3.1)
- CITES Appendix II

Scientific classification
- Kingdom: Animalia
- Phylum: Chordata
- Class: Actinopterygii
- Order: Acipenseriformes
- Family: Acipenseridae
- Genus: Huso
- Species: H. stellatus

Binomial name
- Huso stellatus (Pallas, 1771)
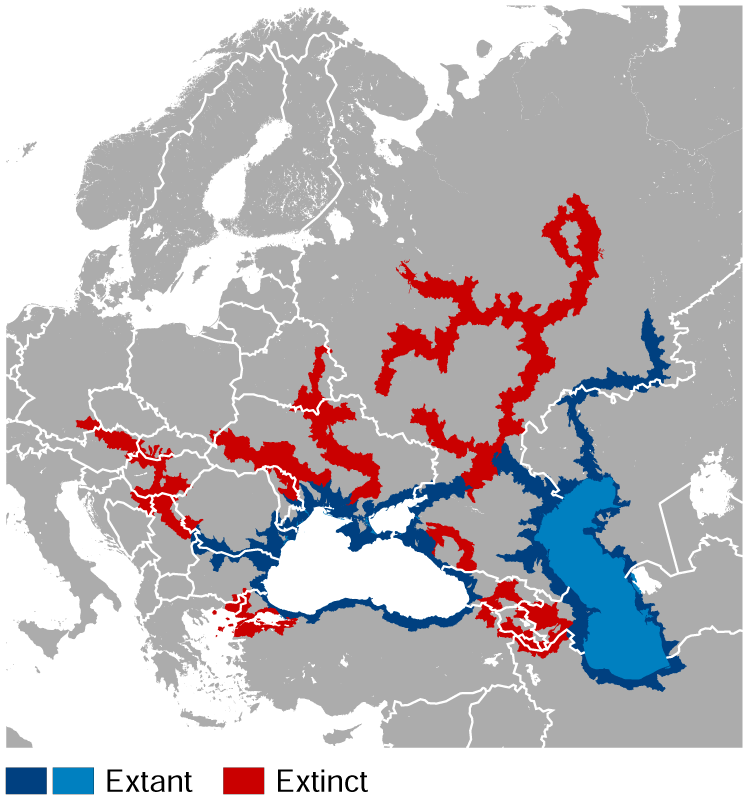
- Starry sturgeon range.

Synonyms
- Acipenser seurugus Güldenstädt 1772 [Bonnaterre 1788]; Acipenser helops Pallas 1814; Ellops helops (Pallas 1814); Acipenser rostratus Brandt & Ratzeburg 1833 [Heckel 1836]; Acipenser ratzeburgii Brandt 1833; Acipenser stellatus donensis Lovetsky 1834; Acipenser stellatus illyricus Brusina 1902; Acipenser stellatus danubialis Brusina 1902; Gladostomus stellatus (Pallas 1771); Helops stellatus (Pallas 1771); Acipenser stellatus stellatus n. cyrensis Berg 1932; Acipenser stellatus ponticus Movchan 1970

= Starry sturgeon =

Species of fish

The starry sturgeon (Huso stellatus), also known as the stellate sturgeon or sevruga (Drakul, Persian: اوزون برون, and Turkish: Uzun Burun, lit. 'long nosed'), is a species of sturgeon. It is native to coastal and basin waters of the Black, Azov, Caspian, and Aegean seas, but it has been extirpated from the last, and the remaining natural population is predicted to follow soon due to overfishing.

The starry sturgeon is an anadromous species, which migrates up rivers to spawn.

It is considered critically endangered by the IUCN and international trade in this species (including its caviar) is restricted by CITES.

== Taxonomy ==
Prior to 2025, it was placed in the genus Acipenser, but this placement was found to be paraphyletic, and it is more accurately placed in the genus Huso. Both of which, however, refer to the common name starry sturgeon.

- A. stellatus
- H. stellatus

== Description ==
The starry sturgeon reaches about 220 cm (7.2 ft) in length and weighs up to 80 kg (180 lb). It is a slim-bodied fish, easily distinguished from other sturgeons by its long, thin, and straight snout that makes up roughly 25% of its total length.

A row of five small barbels lies closer to the mouth than to the tip of the snout. The scales on the lateral line number between 30 and 40 and these features distinguish this fish from the Russian sturgeon (H. gueldenstaedtii). It has many scutes along its top side to act as protection. It has 9-16 on its dorsal, 26-43 on its lateral, 9-14 on the ventral, 40-54 on the dorsal fin rays, and 22-35 on the anal fin rays.

Its general colouring is dark greyish-green or brown with a pale underside. The scales on the lateral line are pale. The maximum reported age for this species is 27 years.

== Behaviour ==
The starry sturgeon is a harmless species, thereby lacking significant natural protection and posing no threat to predators, that feeds on fish, worms, crustaceans, and mollusks. It lies on the bottom of the seabed during the day and feeds mostly at night.

This fish is anadromous and moves upriver into shallow waters to spawn during spring and winter.

== Reproduction ==
Male sturgeons reproduce every 2-3 years after 6-12 years of sexual maturity development, while females follow suit every 3-4 years after 8-14 years of sexual maturity. Both must reproduce under optimal hydrological conditions in their spawn habitat to ensure the highest rate of egg survival.

Spawning sturgeon appears at depths down to 5 m (16.4 ft) on the stone ground of riverbeds with a preferred water flow velocity greater than 1 m/s (2.2 mph). This allows efficient juvenile migration from spawn site to sea to distribute throughout the bodies of water.

During migration, starry sturgeons do not seek or consume food until after the spawning period is complete, when the species moves out of the spawn site to begin feeding.

Optimal temperatures for growing juveniles is from 25-26°C (77-78.8°F) to promote the best rate of growth, but higher temperatures result in lower chances of survival when the juvenile species transitions into adulthood, increasing environmental vulnerabilitiesafter leaving the spawn site.

== Distribution ==
The starry sturgeon can be found in coastal, sea, and estuarine environments. It can be residing mainly in the Caspian, Black, and Asov Seas, but is now absent from the Aegean Sea.

During the spring spawn season, the species is known to migrate to rivers with heavy currents and have a preference for stone-filled river bottoms. If a river is not an optimal spawn habitat, sturgeon have been recorded to reside in flooded river banks with sandy ground.

== Uses ==
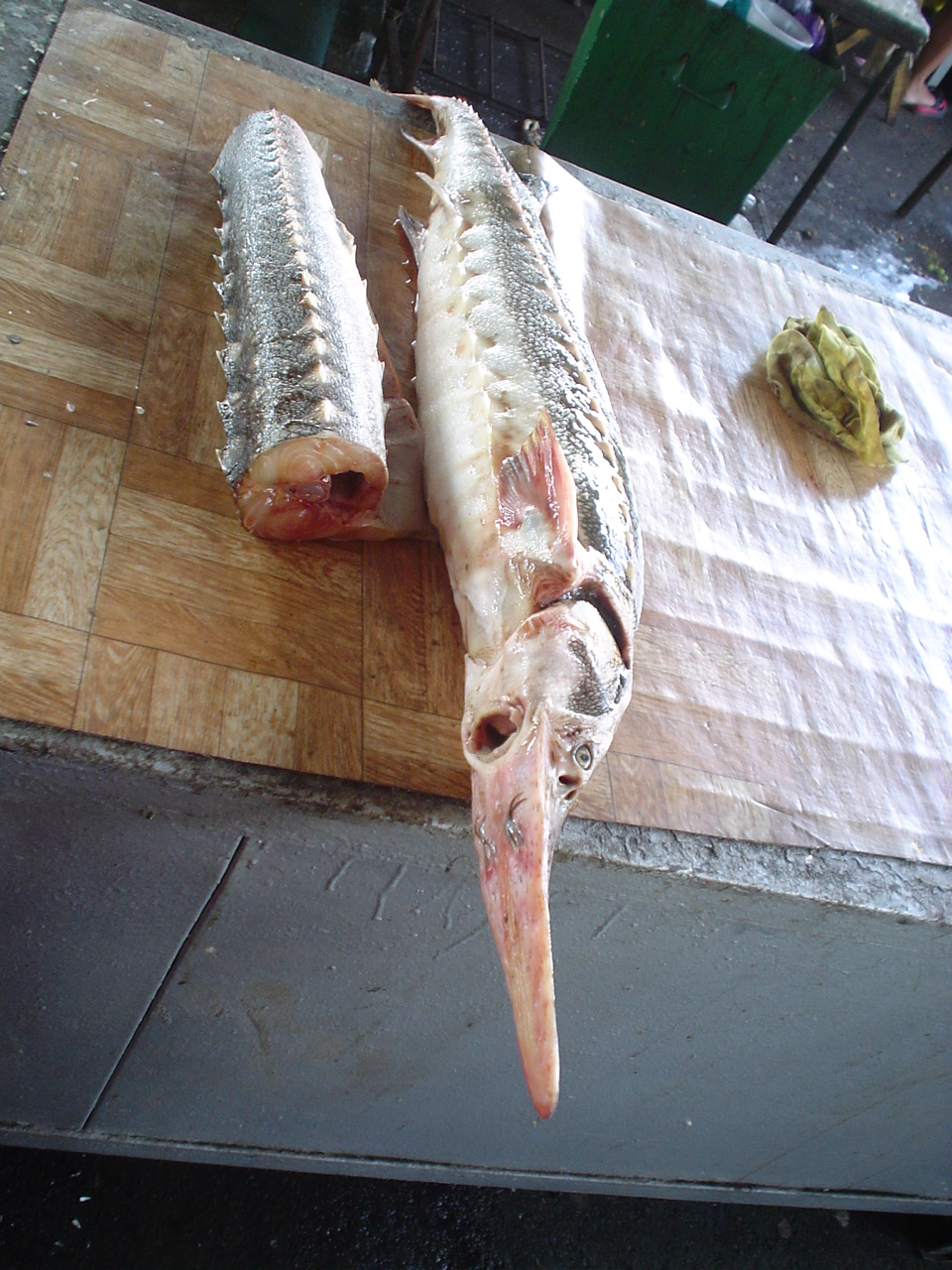
Starry sturgeon in a bazaar in Odesa, Ukraine

The starry sturgeon is an important commercial fish species that serves as food in many cuisines across Europe. It is an essential source of caviar, see Sevruga caviar, that food industries use along with the Beluga sturgeon and the Ossetra sturgeon. Its meat is a good source of vitamins, protein (essential amino acids), and minerals. It can be a common ingredient in kababs, and can be cooked in various methods such as pan frying, smoking, and broiling as seen in the Caspian regions, where the meat is a delicacy.

In aquaculture, many countries around the world have attempted to farm the starry sturgeon, along with other sturgeon species, in hopes of supplying the increasing demand for its meat and caviar. Due to natural resource destruction and overfishing, though, the sustainability of these harvesting facilities has become lost.

With a recorded minimal population doubling time of 4.5 – 14 years, the species' ability to recover from a population loss is difficult to achieve.

== Threats ==
The starry sturgeon species is threatened by habitat loss, overfishing, introduction of unfamiliar pathogens, and increased competition from non-native sturgeon species.

The species is believed to have undergone a loss of 95% of its population in three generations. Illegal fishing is a major threat to the survival of this species.

On the IUCN Red List of Threatened Species, the starry sturgeon was classified as "critically endangered" in 2019.

During migration across the Caspian Sea, the starry sturgeon is vulnerable to illegal trawling, gillnetting, and other fishing practices. This is difficult to regulate, however, due to multiple countries possessing different bodies of the sea, all of which have different laws and regulations.

With commercial fishing providing 90% of the world's wild caviar supply, the species has faced increased fishing pressure to meet the market demands, as well as habitat degradation from vessels, and introduction of invasive species. These have contributed to the depletion of the species' population in the environment.

Introducing new sturgeon species, whether through cultivation or accidental release, can spread pathogens to native starry sturgeons, as well as other neighboring species. In addition to this, starry sturgeons can experience genetic deviation from potential hybridization of non-native sturgeons, affecting the natural diversity in the native ecosystem, and also lead to changes in territorial and aggressive behavior due to increased competition for mating, food, and territory. As such, introgressive hybridization can pose a risk of reducing the native species as a tradeoff for alien sturgeon species.

Overfishing throughout the Caspian Sea has caused the rapid depletion of the species by catching more mature sturgeon than fish hatcheries can replenish using broodstock methods. Reduced stock populations of wild starry sturgeons are the result of the loss of spawn sites combined with overfishing and poaching.

== Conservation ==
Conservation efforts of this species require an understanding of the migration routes, preference to specific locations, and a stock's influence on individual sturgeon.

Hatcheries along Caspian territories and independent countries such as Ukraine, Kazakhstan, and Azerbaijan, have been constructed to artificially breed starry sturgeons and other sturgeon species to increase populations. The countries involved have increased the release of juveniles into the Caspian Sea to combat the population decline. The limited source of wild brood stock, though, poses a risk to the genetic diversity in the species, which leads to vulnerabilities due to low adaptive capabilities to the natural environment.
