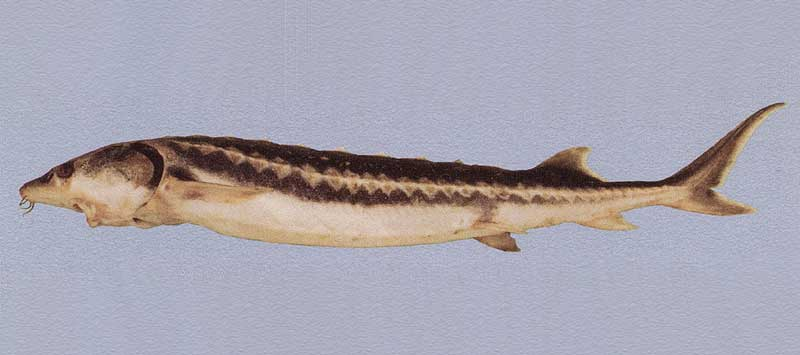
- Acipenser persicus

Conservation status
- Critically Endangered (IUCN 3.1)
- CITES Appendix II

Scientific classification
- Kingdom: Animalia
- Phylum: Chordata
- Class: Actinopterygii
- Order: Acipenseriformes
- Family: Acipenseridae
- Genus: Huso
- Species: H. persicus

Binomial name
- Huso persicus (Borodin, 1897)

Synonyms
- Acipenser güldenstädti persicus Borodin 1897

= Persian sturgeon =

Species of fish

The Persian sturgeon (Huso persicus) is a species of fish in the family Acipenseridae. It is found in the Caspian Sea and to a lesser extent the Black Sea and ascends certain rivers to spawn, mainly the Volga, Kura, Araks and Ural Rivers. It is heavily fished for its flesh and its roe and is limited in its up-river migrations by damming of the rivers. Young fish feed on small invertebrates, graduating to larger prey such as crabs and fish as they grow. The threats faced by this fish include excessive fishing with the removal of immature fish before they have bred, damming of the rivers, loss of spawning areas and water pollution. The International Union for Conservation of Nature has listed the fish as critically endangered and has suggested that the increased provision of hatcheries could be of benefit.

== Taxonomy ==
Prior to 2025, it was placed in the genus Acipenser, but this placement was found to be paraphyletic, and it is more accurately placed in the genus Huso.

== Physical appearance ==
The Persian or Caspian sturgeon has an elongated, bulky body with a bluish tint. This type of sturgeon is endemic to the Caspian and Black Sea basins, but primarily resides in the Caspian Sea. Populations may also occur in tributaries and rivers inbound to the Caspian Sea. Sturgeons are commercially important fishes valued for their meat but mainly for their roe. Formerly omnipresent in the region, heavy fishing of the sturgeon for caviar has forced it to Critically Endangered Species status.

== Distribution ==
The Persian sturgeon feeds at the shelf zone of the sea, primarily in the eastern part of the South Caspian. Individual specimens are found in the North Caspian, western part of the Middle and South Caspian.

== Ecology ==
The Persian sturgeon is a heterotroph equipped with tactile and gustatory receptors; when feeding it simply sucks in its food. The eating habits of the sturgeon change throughout its life. As it begins life the sturgeon feeds on invertebrates including Mysid shrimp, Chironomid flies and gammarid amphipods. At approximately age 2–3 years many feed on crabs or fish, and finally in adulthood the Persian sturgeon consumption is primarily fish.

The sturgeon mainly reproduces in the Volga, Kura, Araks, and Ural rivers. This sexual reproduction occurs in waters that are 20–25 °C (68–77 °F). Spawning occurs at different times for the different rivers. There is spawning in the Volga river from late July to early August, in the Krua river from April to mid-September and in the Ural river from June to July. Other than at times of spawning the sturgeon is a bottom dweller in the mud or sand.

== Conservation ==
There are four considerations one must account for when discussing the conservation of the Persian sturgeon. The regulation of streams and the damming of rivers, the loss of spawning areas, contamination levels of rivers into the Caspian Sea and fishing at sea. Many of the problems for the sturgeon are inflicted by human activity, especially fishing. When fisherman take the sturgeon out of the sea prematurely they disrupt the ecological cycle by taking out immature fish and decreasing the spawning population. One such solution to this problem would be governmental or non-governmental subsidies to aid hatcheries in the artificial reproduction of the Persian sturgeon.
