= Nemesvita =

- Flag Coat of arms

- Location of Veszprém county in Hungary

- Location of Nemesvita
- Coordinates: 46.82147°N 17.36785°E
- Country: Hungary
- County: Veszprém

Area
  - Total: 9.25 km^{2} (3.57 sq mi)

Population (2004)
  - Total: 391
  - Density: 42.27/km^{2} (109.5/sq mi)
- Time zone: UTC+1 (CET)
  - Summer (DST): UTC+2 (CEST)
- Postal code: 8311
- Area code: 87

Nemesvita is a village in Veszprém county, Hungary. It is located about 2 km north of Lake Balaton.
