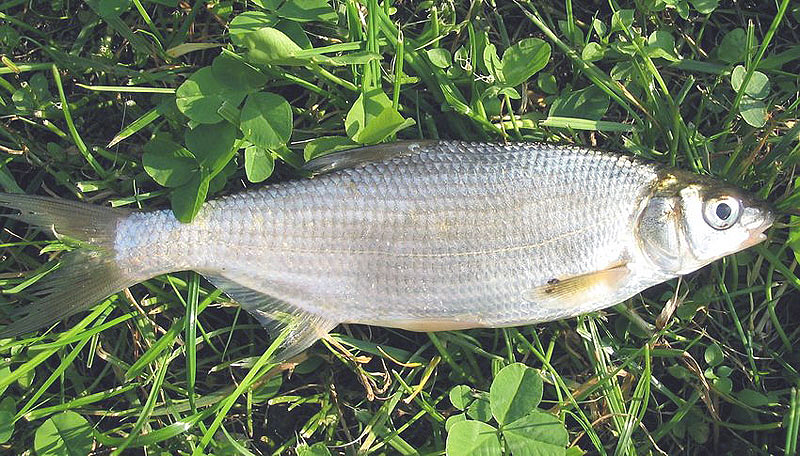

Conservation status
- Least Concern (IUCN 3.1)

Scientific classification
- Kingdom: Animalia
- Phylum: Chordata
- Class: Actinopterygii
- Division: Teleostei
- Order: Cypriniformes
- Family: Leuciscidae
- Subfamily: Leuciscinae
- Genus: Vimba
- Species: V. vimba

Binomial name
- Vimba vimba (Linnaeus, 1758)

Synonyms
- Cyprinus vimba Linnaeus, 1758; Abramis vimba (Linnaeus 1758); Cyprinus zerta Leske, 1774; Cyprinus vimpa Strøm, 1784; Cyprinus serta Shaw, 1804; Cyprinus carinatus Pallas, 1814; Abramis frivaldszkyi Heckel, 1843; Leuciscus parvulus Valenciennes, 1844; Abramis elongatus Valenciennes, 1844; Abramis nordmannii Dybowski, 1862: Abramis elongatus var. asianus Steindachner, 1897; Vimba vimba bergi Velikokhatko, 1940

= Vimba vimba =

Species of fish

Vimba vimba, called also the vimba bream, vimba, zanthe, or zarte, is a species of ray-finned fish belonging to the family Leuciscidae, the daces, Eurasian minnows and related species. This species is found in Europe and Western Asia, where it largely lives in brackish water but makes an annual migration up-river each year to breed.

== Taxonomy ==
Vimba vimba was first formally described as Cyprinus vimba is the 10th edition of Systema Naturae, published in 1758 by Carl Linnaeus, with its type locality given as the "Lakes of Sweden". This species is now classified in the genus Vimba, which was proposed as a genus by the Austrian zoologist Leopold Fitzinger in 1873, with this species being the type species by absolute tautonymy. It is classified within the subfamily Leuciscinae in the Family Leuciscidae.

== Etymology ==
Vimba vimba is the type species of the genus Vimba, a name which Fitzinger used tautonymously for this species and that is thought to be derived from the Swedish vernacular name for this fish, vimma.

== Description ==
Vimba vimba was at one time classified as a bream as it also has a long anal fin, but has now been placed in a different genus. Its body is not as deep as that of the bream. It also resembles the asp, but its mouth is small and behind the snout, whereas the asp has a large mouth with the lower jaw protruding. This species grows to about 25 to 45 centimetres (9.8 to 17.7 in), with a weight of up to 2 kilograms (4.4 lb). The scales are small, and there are about sixty of them along the lateral line. This fish is a deep bluish-green on the dorsal surface, and silvery along the flanks. The eyes are yellow, and the pectoral and pelvic fins have reddish-yellow bases. The colouring becomes more vivid in the breeding season, and males may have the operculum, base of the fins and the belly turn orange.

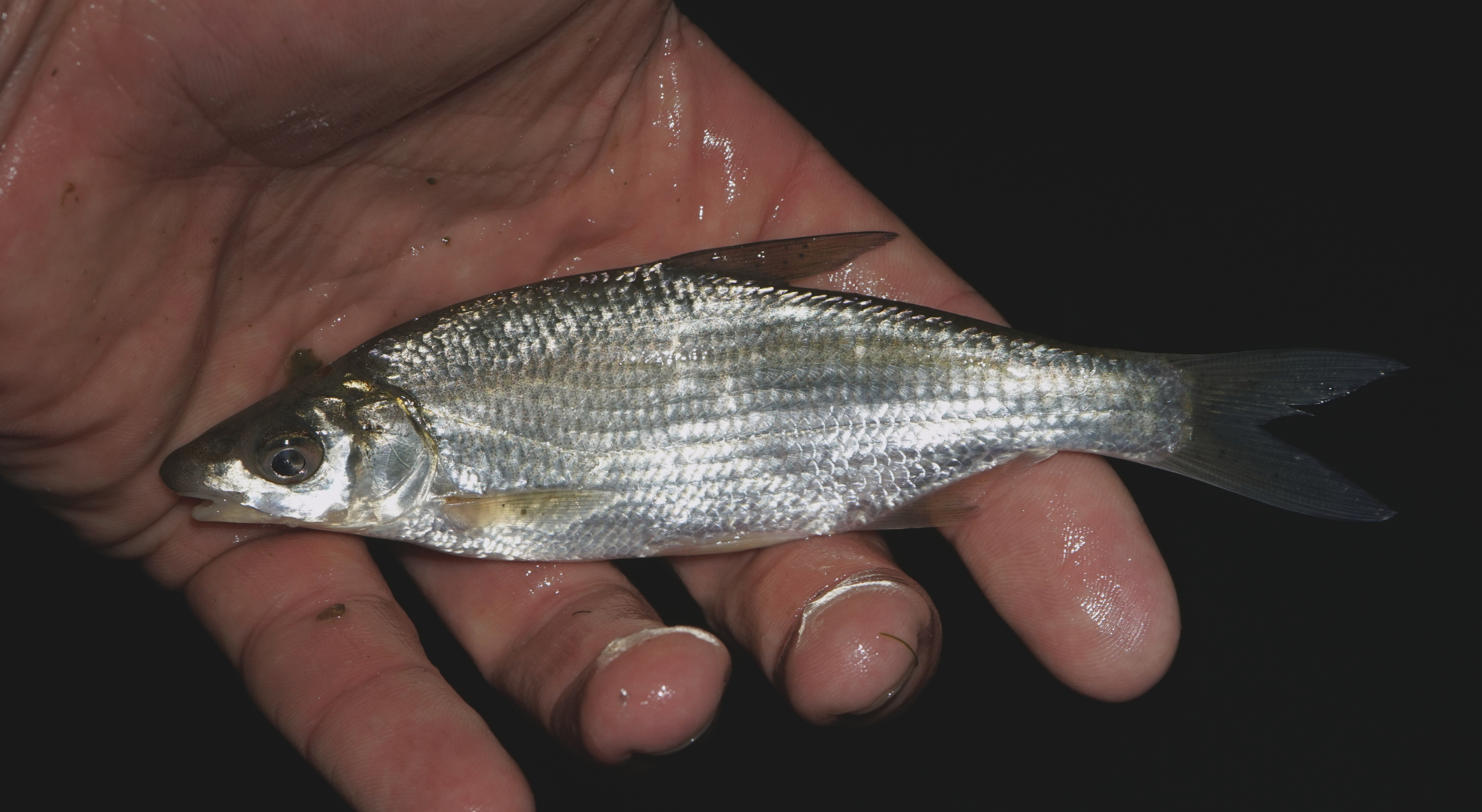
The vimba bream has a long anal fin.

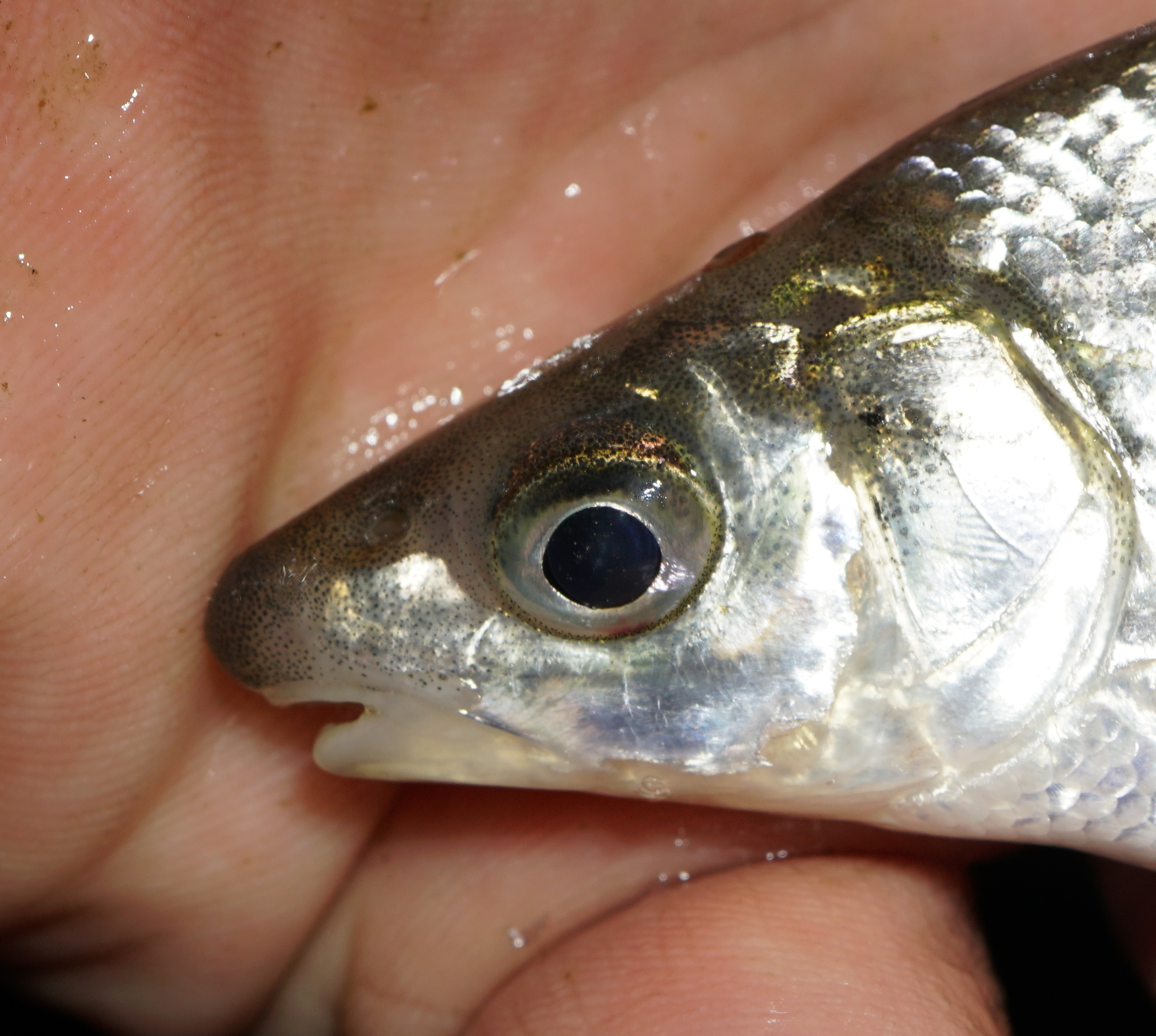
The vimba bream has a typical head form similar to the nase.

== Distribution and habitat ==
Vimba vimba Is found in Europe and Western Asia in the drainage basins of the North Sea, Baltic Sea, Black Sea, Sea of Marmara, Aegean Sea and Caspian Sea. In the North Sea drainage, it is native to rivers between the Elbe and Ems. It has been introduced into the Rhine. In the Baltic Sea, it is absent from Denmark, northern Sweden and northern Finland. In the Black Sea, it has been extirpated from Crimea, and is not found between the Melet River in Ordu Province, Turkey and southern Georgia. In Anatolia, it also occurs in rivers draining into the Aegean and Turkish Mediterranean. It has also been introduced into the lower Volga. This species is found in the brackish waters of estuaries, as well as in the lower and middle reaches of rivers and in some larger subalpine lakes. A portion of the population is non-migratory and is permanently resident in rivers.

== Behaviour ==
Vimba vimba move in small shoals along the sea coast, feeding on invertebrates which they pick from the seabed, and the eggs of other fish. They leave the sea in May or June, swimming upriver to spawn in fast-moving tributaries with stony or gravelly bases and little vegetation. The males prepare several areas of riverbed on which the females deposit batches of eggs.
