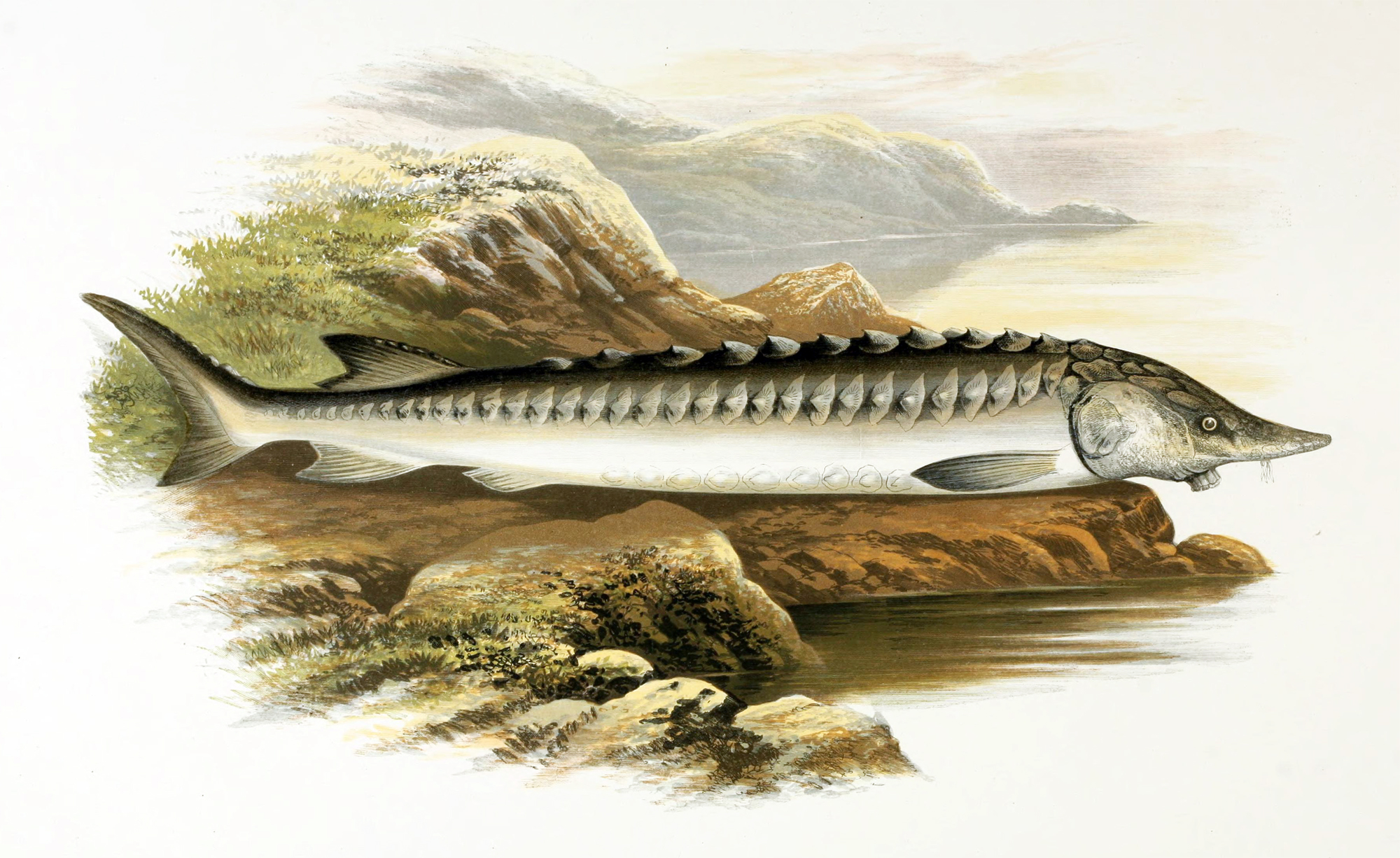
- Acipenser sturio

Conservation status
- Critically Endangered (IUCN 3.1)
- CITES Appendix I

Scientific classification
- Kingdom: Animalia
- Phylum: Chordata
- Class: Actinopterygii
- Order: Acipenseriformes
- Family: Acipenseridae
- Genus: Acipenser
- Species: A. sturio

Binomial name
- Acipenser sturio Linnaeus, 1758

Synonyms
- List: Acipenser attilus Rafinesque 1820 corrig. Gray 1851; Acipenser latirostris Parnell 1831-37; Acipenser hospitus Krøyer 1852; Acipenser thompsonii Ball 1856; Acipenser sturioides Malm 1861; Acipenser yarrellii Duméril 1867; Acipenser (Huso) milberti Duméril 1870; Acipenser (Huso) fitzingerii Valenciennes ex Duméril 1870; Acipenser (Huso) ducissae Duméril 1870; Acipenser (Huso) nehelae Duméril 1870; Acipenser (Huso) podapos Duméril 1870; Acipenser (Huso) valenciennii Duméril 1870; Acipenser laevissimus Valenciennes ex Duméril 1870; Acipenser europaeus Brusina 1902; Acipenser shipus Güldenstädt 1772 non Lovetzky 1834; Antacea shipa (Güldenstadt 1772); Antaceus shipus (Güldenstadt 1772); Shipa shipa (Güldenstädt 1772); Sturio vulgaris Rafinesque 1810; Acipenser vulgaris (Rafinesque 1810) Billberg 1833; Acipenser atlanticus Rafinesque 1820 corrig.

= European sea sturgeon =

European sturgeon

Species of fish

The European sea sturgeon (Acipenser sturio), also known as the Atlantic sturgeon or common sturgeon, is a species of sturgeon native to Europe. It was formerly abundant, being found in coastal habitats all over Europe. Most specifically, they reach the Black and Baltic Sea. It is anadromous and breeds in rivers. It is currently a critically endangered species. Although the name Baltic sturgeon sometimes has been used, it has now been established that sturgeon of the Baltic region are A. oxyrinchus, a species otherwise restricted to the Atlantic coast of North America.

== Description ==
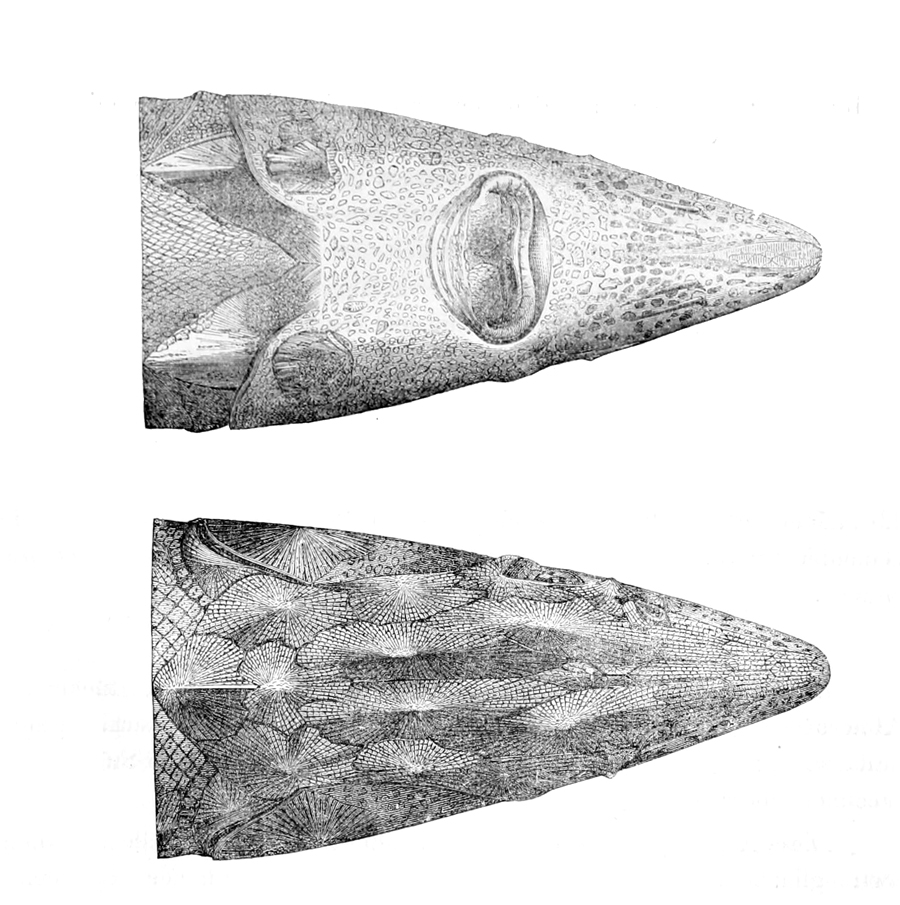
Head of a European sea sturgeon

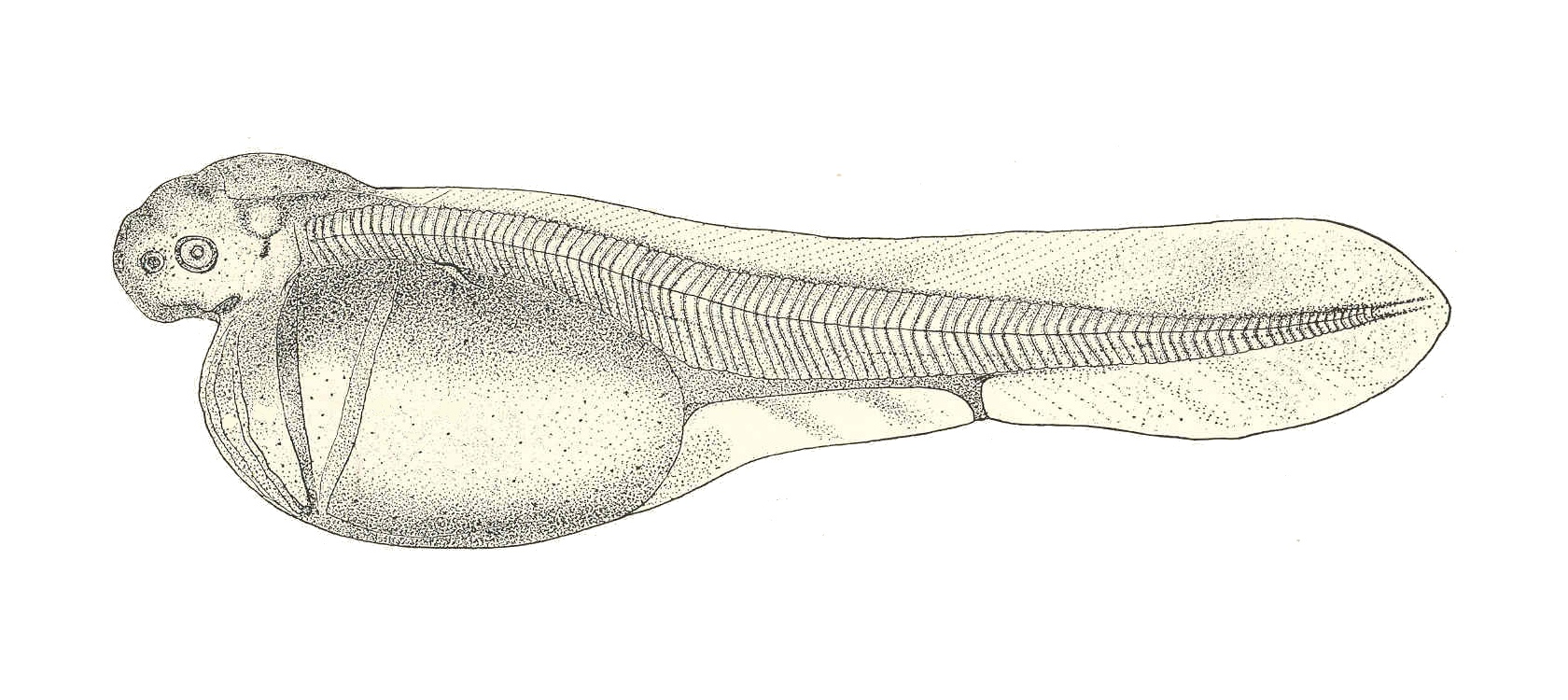
Newly-hatched larva

The wedge-shaped head of the European sea sturgeon ends in a long point. There are many sensitive barbels on the facial area. The dorsal fins are located very far back on the body. Five longitudinal lines of large osseous plates are found on the body of the fish. The dorsal side of the European sea sturgeon is greenish-brown to blackish with golden tints, the flanks are light with silvery tints and the belly is white.

This sturgeon can reach 6 m (20 ft) and 400 kg (880 lb) in weight, but a more common length is 1.25 m (4 ft 1 in). They can reach an age of 100 years, and have a late sexual maturity (12 to 14 years for the males and 16 to 18 years for the females).

== Distribution and habitat ==
They are found on the coasts of Europe, except in the northernmost regions and the Baltic region, and have rarely even been known to cross the Atlantic Ocean to the coasts of North America. Like many other sturgeons, they spawn in the rivers inland from the coast. The species can tolerate wide spread salinities and spend most of their lives in saltwater but migrate to spawn in freshwater.

== Conservation ==
Until the first decades of the twentieth century, these fish were locally abundant in Europe and were caught extensively for their caviar, but a sharp decline due to overfishing (which greatly accelerated from the second half of the nineteenth century onwards) led to their disappearance from the vast majority of their former range. They have been a protected species in Europe since 1982. Despite their estimated range of distribution, they have become so rare that they only breed in the Garonne river basin in France. Conservation projects involving this species include reintroductions based on specimens from aquaculture with the first releases in 1995. For example, 87 sturgeons were experimentally released in the Rhine river near Nijmegen in 2012 and 2015. Further release projects are underway on the River Elbe.

== Diet ==
Like other sturgeons, they eat polychaete worms and crustaceans which they find with their barbels.

== Population ==
Although no specific population estimates are available, the abundance of wild, mature European Sturgeon is estimated to be less than 800 individuals. The last time the species hatched was in the Garonne River in France in 1994, and genetic analysis reveals that the 1994 cohort was formed by only one mating pair. Because the wild population is so small, a captive breeding and stocking program is vital to the species' survival. Although restoration operations, such as artificially bred individual restocking, have been successful in the Gironde estuary and the Elbe River (Germany), recovery for the European sturgeon is a long process that might take 30–50 years. Bycatch in commercial trawls and gillnets, pollution, climate change, and potential competition with other species are dangers to the species. It was estimated there are 20 - 750 mature individuals in wild at the moment of assessment, which was at 2020.

== Threats ==
The European sea sturgeon faces various threats that have historically diminished population sizes and continue to impede the recovery of self-sustaining populations. Bycatch, primarily, has been a significant threat with the potential to counteract conservation efforts. Additionally, several other factors contribute to the challenges faced by this species.

Bycatch emerges as the primary threat to European sea sturgeon populations, having played a crucial role in reducing their numbers in the past. This ongoing threat poses a considerable risk to the recovery of self-sustaining populations, necessitating targeted conservation measures to address the issue and mitigate its impact.

The extraction of gravel in the Garonne river in France and Spain poses a potential threat to European sea sturgeon populations. This activity, along with dam construction, contributes to habitat degradation, impacting the availability of suitable spawning and feeding sites. Preservation of these critical habitats becomes essential for the species' long-term survival and recovery.

Dam construction, pollution, and river regulation further exacerbate the challenges faced by the European sea sturgeon. These anthropogenic factors have led to the loss and degradation of crucial spawning and feeding sites. Additionally, the introduction of alien predators has been identified as a significant impact, hindering the recovery of sturgeon populations, as highlighted by the OSPAR Commission in 2019.
