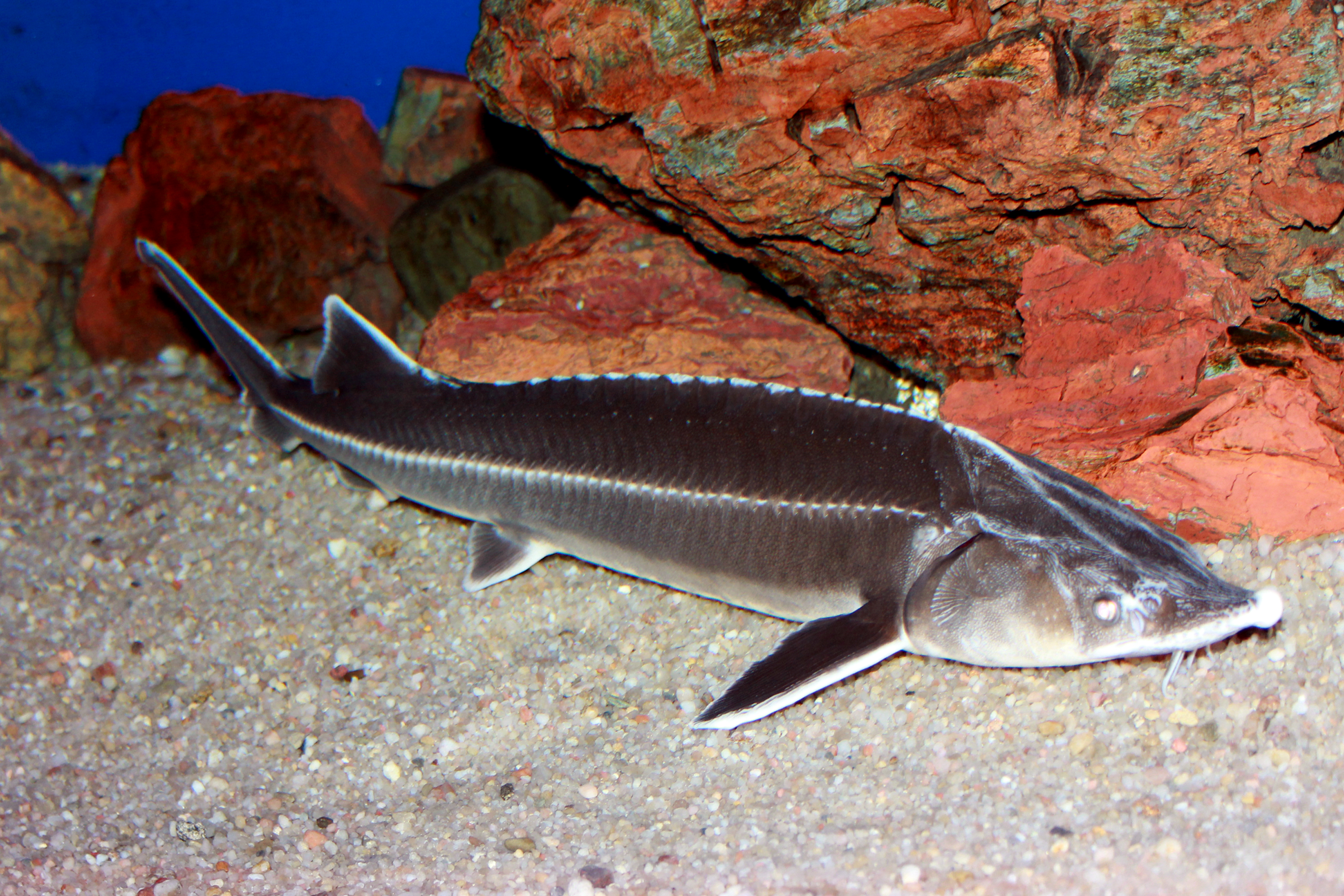

Conservation status
- Endangered (IUCN 3.1)
- CITES Appendix II

Scientific classification
- Kingdom: Animalia
- Phylum: Chordata
- Class: Actinopterygii
- Order: Acipenseriformes
- Family: Acipenseridae
- Genus: Huso
- Species: H. ruthenus

Binomial name
- Huso ruthenus (Linnaeus, 1758)
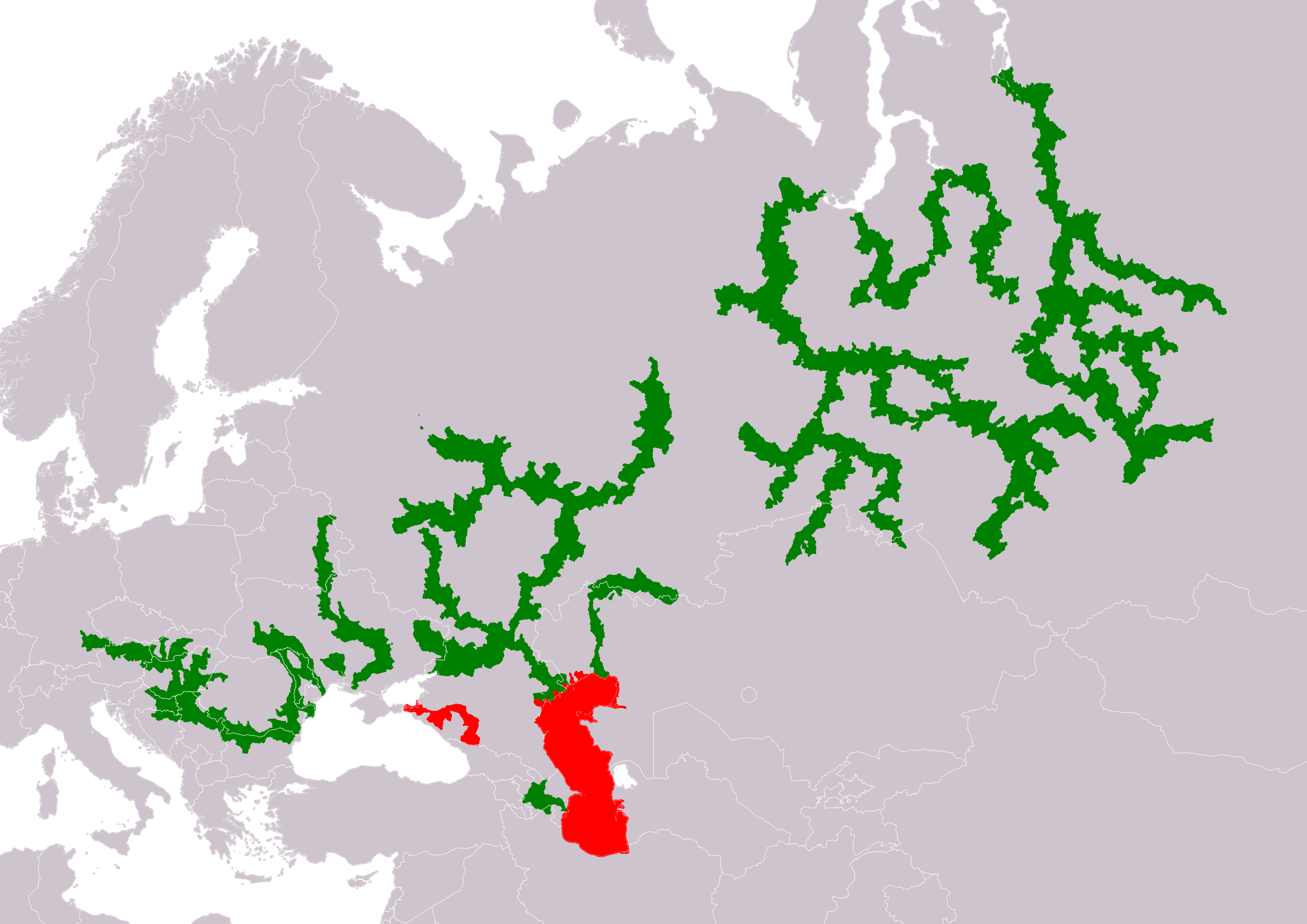
- Range of A. ruthenus Resident Extinct

Synonyms
- List: Acipenser pygmaeus Pallas 1814 non Reisinger 1830; ?Acipenser kostera Fitzinger 1832; ?Acipenser koster Gmelin 1774 nomen nudum; Acipenser marsiglii Brandt 1833; Acipenser kamensis Lovetsky 1834; Acipenser gmelini Fitzinger 1836; Acipenser aleutensis Fitzinger 1836; Acipenser dubius Heckel 1836; ?Acipenser ruthenus var. leucotica Brandt 1853; Acipenser ruthenus var. grisescens Brandt 1853; Acipenser (Sterletus) kankreni Valenciennes ex Duméril 1870; Acipenser (Sterletus) lovetzkyi Duméril 1870; Sterledus ruthenus var. sibiricus Dybowski 1874; Acipenser jeniscensis Herzenstein 1895; Acipenser ruthenus var. albinea Brusina 1902; Acipenser ruthenus var. birostrata Brusina 1902; Acipenser ruthenus var. obtusirostra Brusina 1902 non Lovetsky 1834; Acipenser ruthenus var. septemcarinata Brusina 1902; Acipenser ruthenicus Brusina 1902; Acipenser sterlet Brusina 1902; Acipenser sterleta Güldenstädt 1772; Acipenser ruthenus var. albus Antipa 1909; Acipenser ruthenus var. erytraea Antipa 1909; Acipenser ruthenus var. brevirostris Antipa 1909; Acipenser ruthenus ruzskyi Johansen 1946; Acipenser ruthenus ruzskyi n. baschmakovae Johansen 1946; Acipenser kosterus Fitzinger 1832; Euacipenser ruthenus (Linnaeus 1758); Sterledus ruthenus sibiricus Dybowski 1874; Sterleta ruthena (Linnaeus 1758); Sterletae ruthena (Linnaeus 1758); Sterletus ruthenus (Linnaeus 1758)

= Sterlet =

Species of fish

The sterlet (Huso ruthenus) is a relatively small species of sturgeon from Eurasia native to large rivers that flow into the Black Sea, Azov Sea, and Caspian Sea, as well as rivers in Siberia as far east as Yenisei. Populations migrating between fresh and salt water (anadromous) have been extirpated. It is also known as the sterlet sturgeon.

Due to overfishing (for its flesh, caviar, and isinglass), pollution, and dams, the sterlet has declined throughout its native range and is considered endangered by the IUCN. Restocking projects are ongoing, and it has been introduced to some regions outside its native range, but the latter have generally not become self-sustaining. Today, the majority of the international trade involves sterlets from aquaculture.

== Taxonomy ==
Prior to 2025, it was placed in the genus Acipenser, but this placement was found to be paraphyletic, and it is more accurately placed in the genus Huso.

== Physical appearance ==
The sterlet may reach 16 kg in weight and 100 to 125 cm in length, rarely exceeding a length of 90 cm. It is quite variable in coloration, but usually has a yellowish ventral side.

It can be distinguished from other European species of sturgeons by the presence of a great number of whitish lateral scutes, fringed barbels, and an elongated and narrow snout, highly variable in length.

== Feeding habits ==
The sterlet's main source of food is benthic organisms; they commonly feed on crustaceans, worms, and insect larvae.

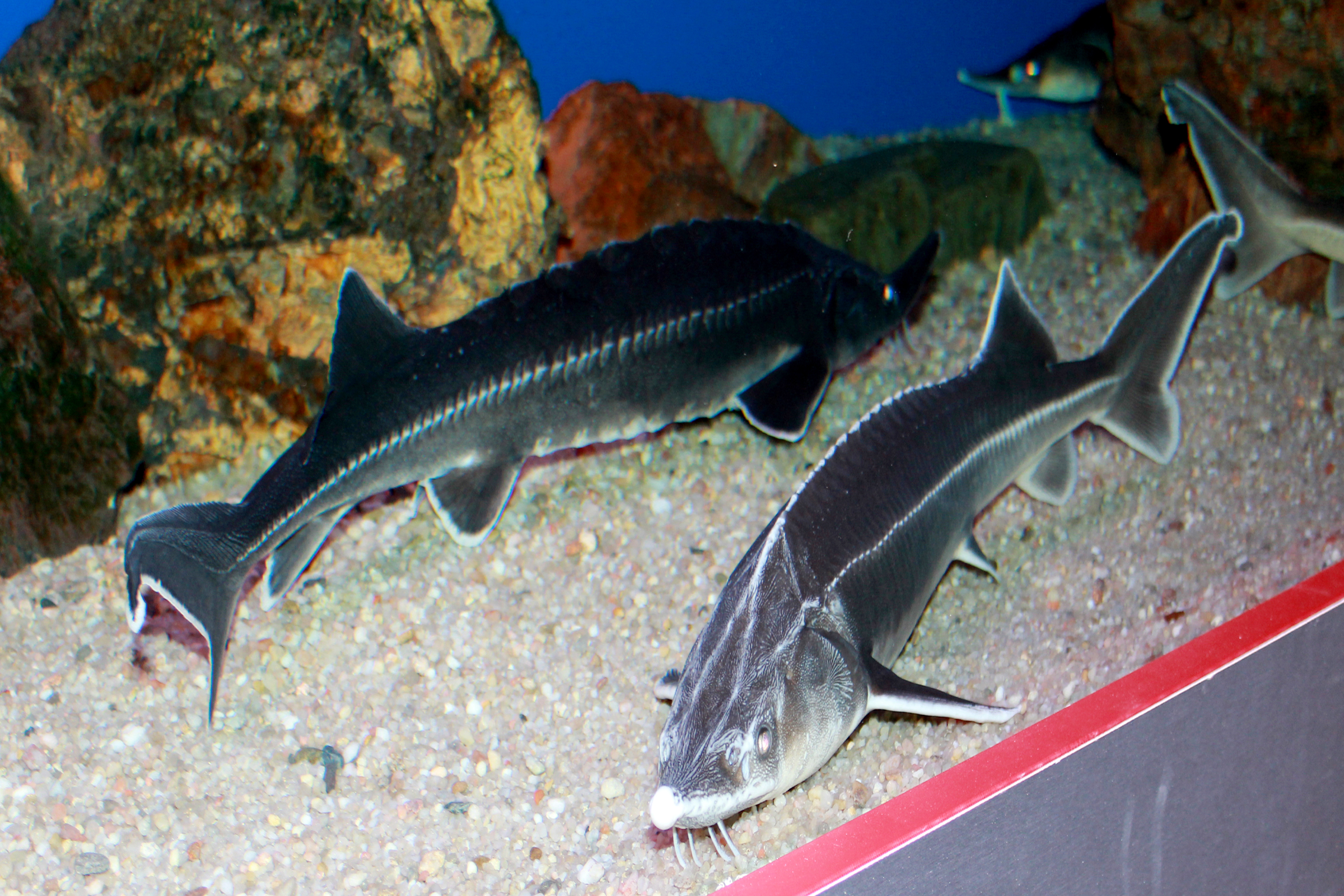
On exhibition Subaqueous Vltava, Prague

== Life history ==
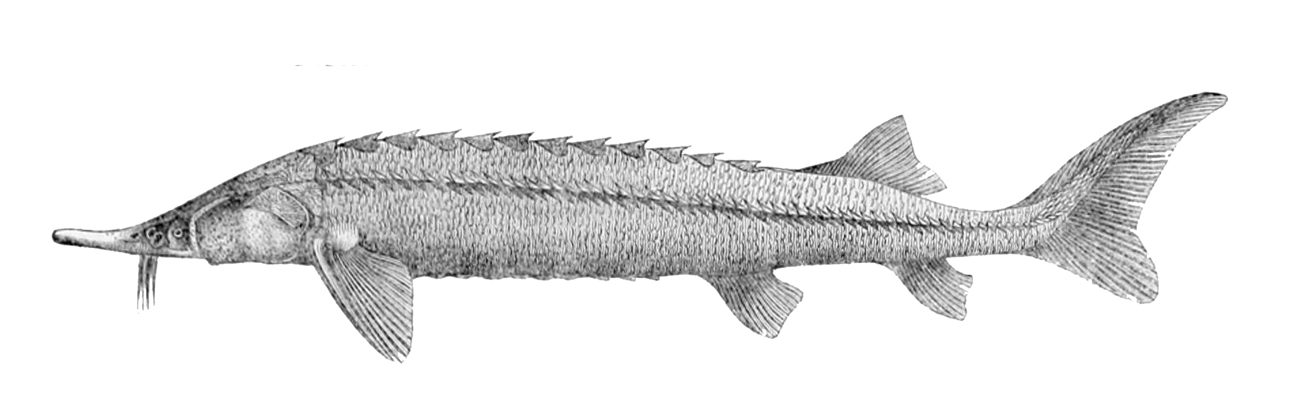

The sterlet commonly reaches the age of 22 to 25 years. Males reach sexual maturity at 3–7 years old and females at 4–12 years old. Spawning occurs from the middle of April to the beginning of June. Females may lay from 15,000 to 44,000 eggs, at water temperatures preferably 12–17 °C (54–63 °F).

== As pond fish ==
Sterlets require relatively large ponds with good water conditions, and may get entangled in plants such as blanketweed. They may require special food such as sterlet sticks, as they are unable to digest the vegetable proteins usually found in commercial fish foods.

== As food ==
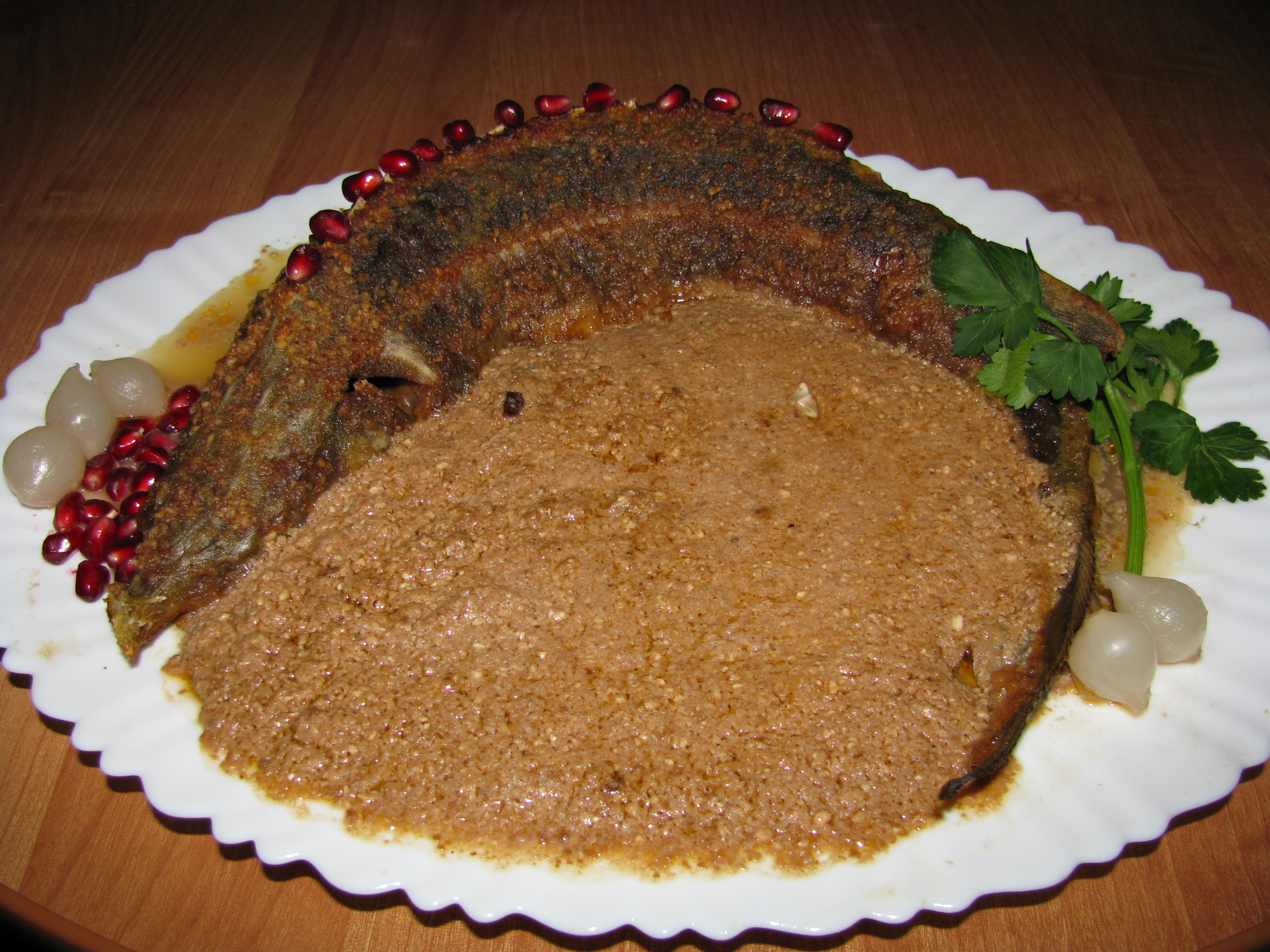
Sterlet with satsivi

In Russia, it is held in high esteem on account of its flesh, contributing to kinds of caviar and isinglass.

== History in the Danube ==
The sterlet (Acipenser ruthenus in Linnaeus' classification) is the last of the five native sturgeon species inhabiting the Middle and Upper Danube River. Its population has dropped significantly, mainly due to the degradation of main habitats, spawning grounds and foraging grounds.
