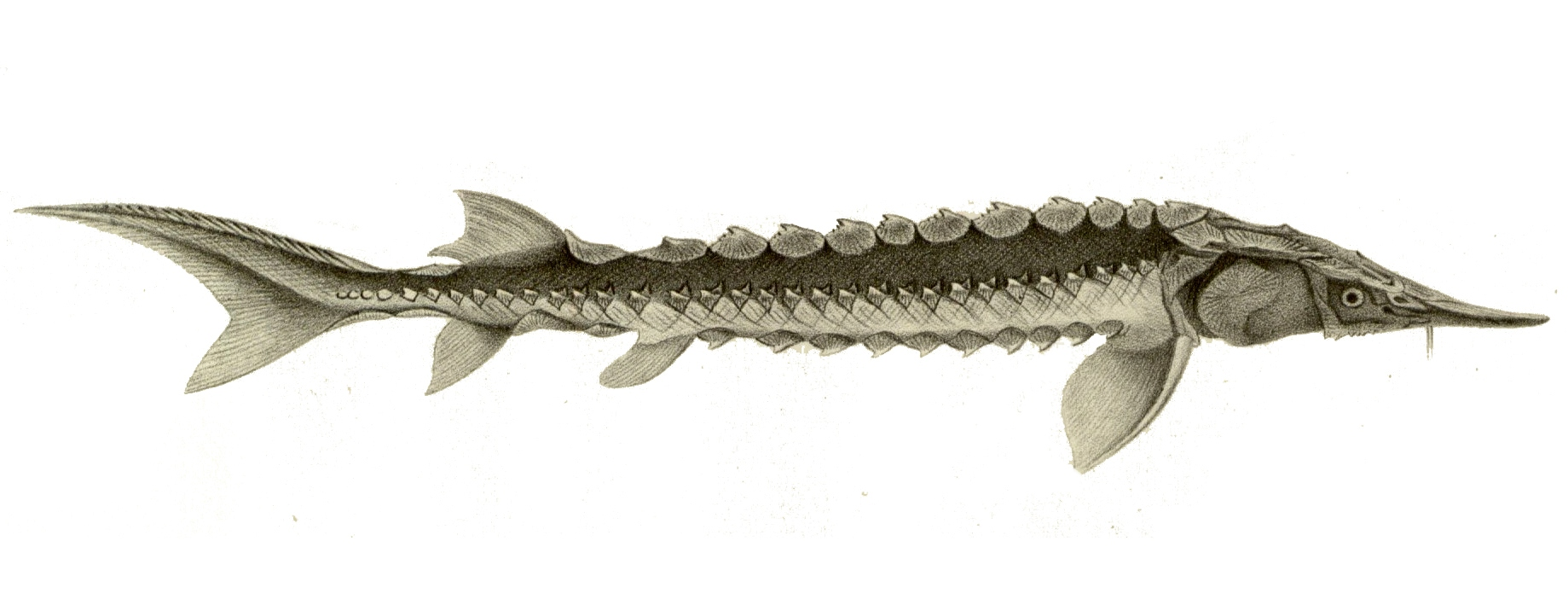

Conservation status
- Extinct in the Wild (IUCN 3.1)
- CITES Appendix II

Scientific classification
- Kingdom: Animalia
- Phylum: Chordata
- Class: Actinopterygii
- Order: Acipenseriformes
- Family: Acipenseridae
- Genus: Sinosturio
- Species: S. dabryanus

Binomial name
- Sinosturio dabryanus (Duméril, 1869)

Synonyms
- Acipenser dabryanus Duméril 1869

= Dabry's sturgeon =

Species of fish

Dabry's sturgeon (Sinosturio dabryanus), also known as the Yangtze sturgeon, Changjiang sturgeon and river sturgeon, is a species of fish in the sturgeon family, Acipenseridae. It is endemic to China and today restricted to the Yangtze River basin, but was also recorded from the Yellow River basin in the past. It was a food fish of commercial importance. Its populations declined drastically, and since 1988, it was designated an endangered species on the Chinese Red List in Category I and commercial harvest was banned. It has been officially declared extinct in the wild by the IUCN as of 21 July 2022.

== Taxonomy ==
Prior to 2025, it was placed in the genus Acipenser, but this placement was long found to be paraphyletic. In 2025, it was moved to the revived genus Sinosturio. It is the type species of the genus.

== Appearance ==
This sturgeon has been known to reach 2.5 m (8.2 ft) in length, but it is usually much smaller. Its body is blue-gray above and yellowish white on the belly, with five rows of scutes. The head is triangular and the snout is long with the mouth located on the underside. There are two pairs of barbels.

== Behavior ==
The fish lives in slow-moving river waters over substrates of sand and mud. It feeds on aquatic plants, invertebrates, and small fish. This species is potamodromous, taking part in a migration, but never leaving fresh water. It spawns in the upper Yangtze, mainly during March and April, and sometimes around November and December. Males spawn each year, but most females do not. The female produces 57,000 to 102,000 eggs.

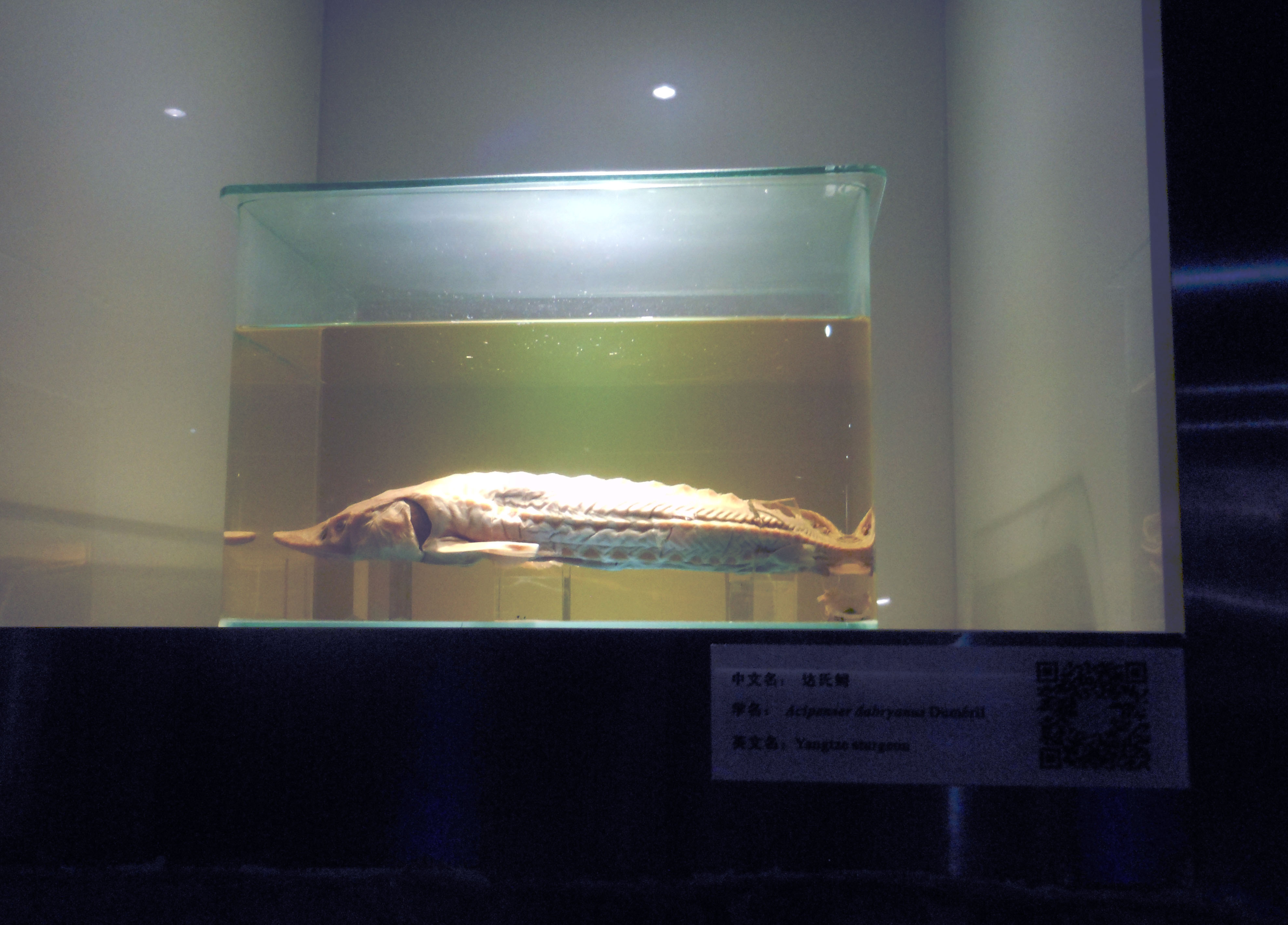
A specimen of Sinosturio dabryanus exhibited in the Museum of Hydrobiological Sciences of Wuhan Institute of Hydrobiology

== Conservation status ==
This was once a common fish in the Yangtze system. It was known from the main river and some of its larger tributaries, as well as some lakes attached to the system. By the late 20th century, it was extirpated from the lower river and limited to the upper reaches in Sichuan. The main causes of its drastic decline include overfishing, including the overharvesting of juveniles. The construction of dams, notably the Gezhouba Dam and Three Gorges Dam, blocked the movement of the fish along the river, restricting it to the upper reaches. It also caused habitat fragmentation and degradation. Increased development and deforestation on land near the river has increased pollution from wastewater and runoff. The Yangtze basin is and was its main range, but it has also been found in the Yellow River basin, with the last records in the 1960s.

The fish has been bred in captivity since the 1970s. Thousands of individuals have been released into the Yangtze basin, but are apparently not breeding. Nevertheless, this restocking may be the only effort preventing the extinction of the species.

On 7 June 2024, the China Three Gorges Corporation released over 800,000 individuals bred in captivity into the Yangtze River in Yibin with plans to continue breeding them with future mass releases in the future.

On 13 April 2025, the same scientists confirmed the first wild reproduction of this species after significant efforts to cultivate the correct conditions for the sturgeon to spawn. Three days later, on 16 April, the first wild hatchlings had been spotted, proving that reintroduction of the sturgeon to the wild is possible.

== See also ==
- List of endangered and protected species of China
- Chinese sturgeon (Sinosturio sinensis)
- Chinese paddlefish (Psephurus gladius)
