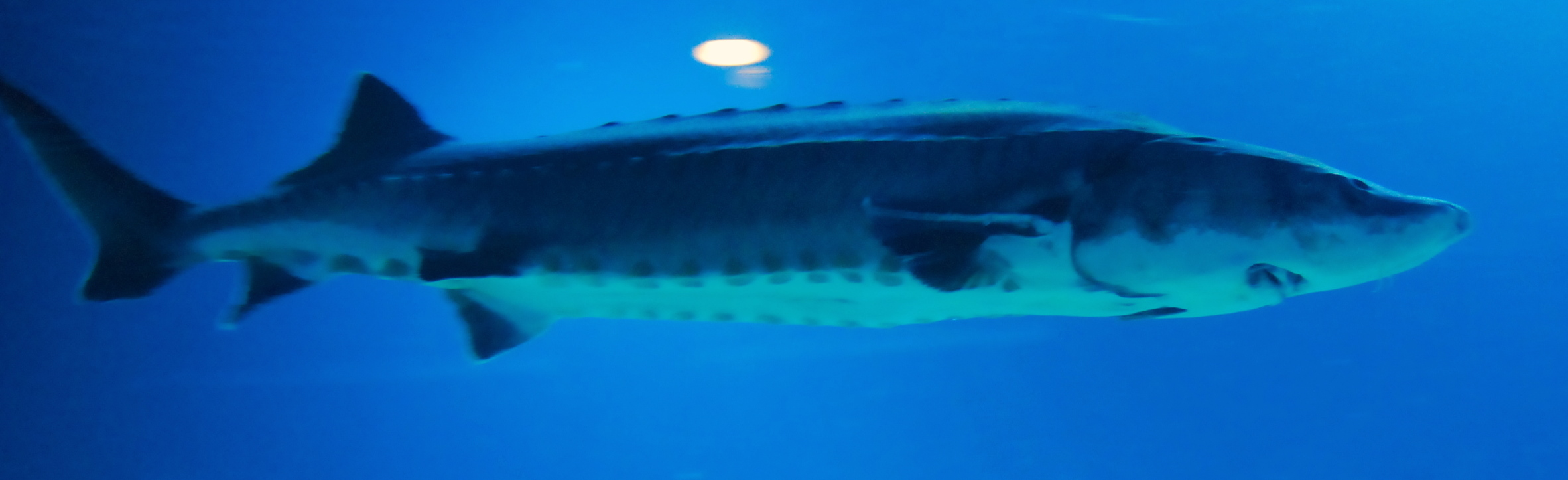
- Sinosturio sinensis in Beijing Aquarium

Conservation status
- Critically Endangered (IUCN 3.1)
- CITES Appendix II

Scientific classification
- Kingdom: Animalia
- Phylum: Chordata
- Class: Actinopterygii
- Order: Acipenseriformes
- Family: Acipenseridae
- Genus: Sinosturio
- Species: S. sinensis

Binomial name
- Sinosturio sinensis (Gray, 1835)

Synonyms
- Acipenser sinensis Gray, 1835; Acipenser kikuchii Jordan & Snyder 1901

= Chinese sturgeon =

Species of fish

The Chinese sturgeon (Sinosturio sinensis; Chinese: 中华鲟; pinyin: zhōnghuá xún) is a critically endangered member of the family Acipenseridae in the order Acipenseriformes. Historically, this anadromous fish was found in China, Japan, and the Korean Peninsula, but it has been extirpated from Korea, Japan, and most regions in China due to habitat loss and overfishing.

It is strictly protected by the Chinese government, named a "national treasure" much like its mammalian counterpart, the giant panda. China has several conservation programmes, including reserves specifically aimed at this species and restocking through release of juveniles in the Yangtze River.

== Taxonomy ==
Prior to 2025, it was placed in the genus Acipenser. However, this placement was long known to be paraphyletic. In 2025, it was moved to the revived genus Sinosturio.

== Physical appearance ==
Sturgeon are comparatively basal species of fish, whose earliest fossils date back to the Cretaceous period. They are best-known members of the bony fish taxon Chondrostei, a group of bony fishes that have cartilaginous skeletons superficially similar to the skeletons seen in the unrelated chondrichthyan fishes. In Qing dynasty Chinese cuisine, its meat and cartilaginous skeleton was often cooked and served together, and considered a delicacy.

Adult Chinese sturgeon can range between 2 and 5 m (6.6 and 16.4 ft) in total length, and weigh between 200 and 500 kg (440 and 1,100 lb), ranking them among the largest sturgeon in the world. Its head is acuminate, with the mouth under its jaw.

== Lifecycle ==
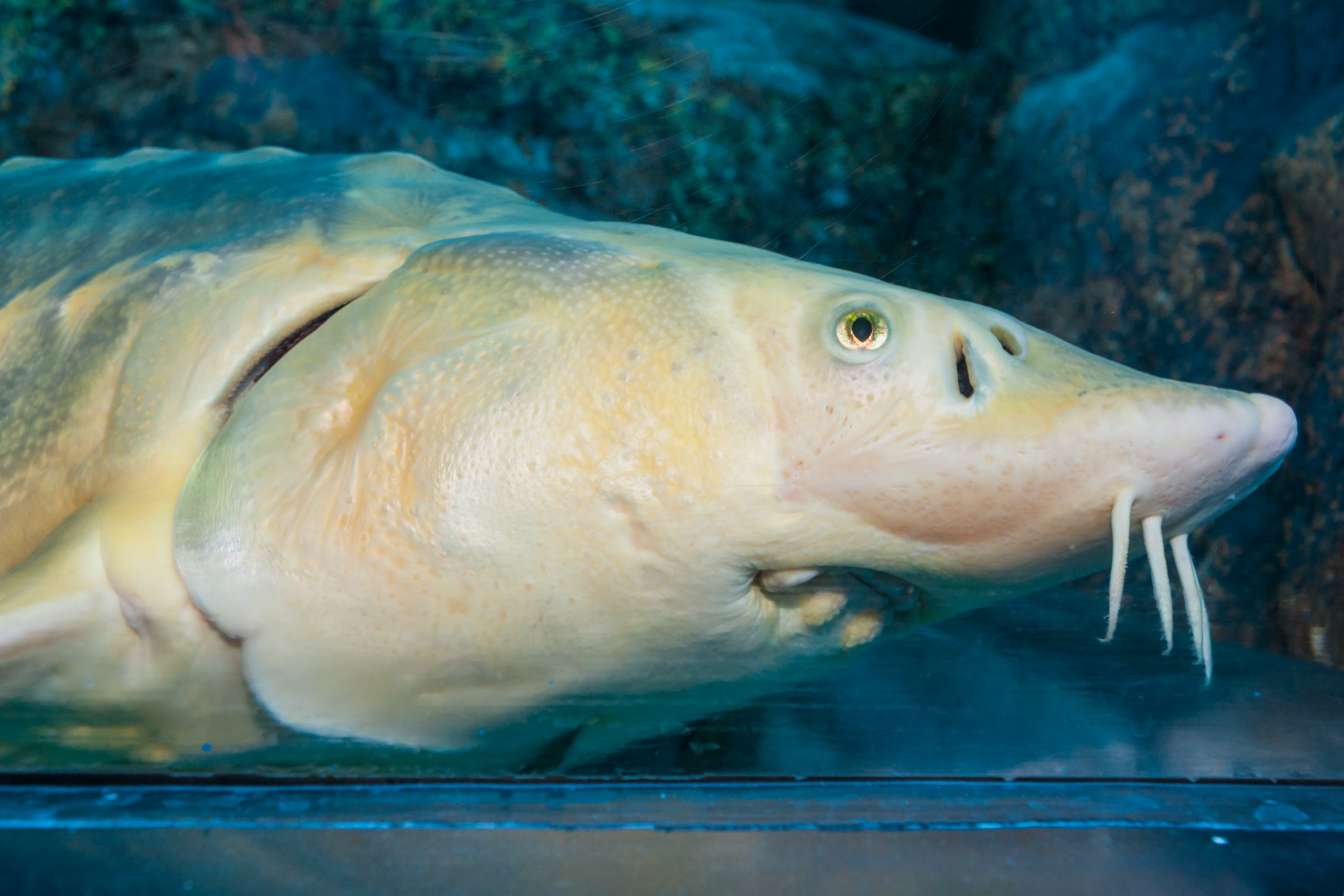
Chinese sturgeon in Dalian Laohutan Ocean Park

Most sturgeon spawn in fresh water and migrate to salt water to mature. The Chinese sturgeon can be considered a large freshwater fish, although it spends part of its lifecycle in seawater, like the salmon, except Chinese sturgeon spawn multiple times throughout their lives.

The Chinese sturgeon has a habit of upstream migration; it dwells along the coasts of China's eastern areas and migrates back up rivers for propagation upon reaching sexual maturity. It has the longest migration of any sturgeon in the world, and once migrated more than 3,200 km (2,000 mi) up the Yangtze. The sturgeon may breed three or four times during its life, and a female sturgeon can carry in excess of a million eggs in one cycle, which are released for external fertilisation when mature. The survival rate of hatchings is estimated to be less than 1%.

The Chinese Sturgeon will migrate from the mouth of the Yangtze River to the spawning ground and the female Acipenser Sinensis will stay there for a year to prepare for spawning activities, and then all Acipenser Sinensis will migrate to the lower middle and upper layers for spawning activities and female Acipenser Sinensis leave earlier than male Acipenser Sinensis. Changes in the water temperature of the Yangtze River will delay the spawning time of Acipenser Sinensis, and may lead to the degeneration of gonads.

=== Habitat ===
The Chinese sturgeon is a critically endangered species native to China. It is largely dispersed over the main streams of the Yangtze River and coastal regions of Qiantang River, Minjiang River, and Pearl River. The adults are predators that consume any aquatic animal that can be swallowed, while the young feed on aquatic insects, larvae, diatoms, and humic substances.

In the 1970s, an estimated 2,000 Chinese sturgeon spawned in the Yangtze River every year. Now, that number is down to several hundred due to the threats to its habitat, such as pollution and other human action. The channel for adult fish migrating to traditional spawning sites such as the Jinsha River in the upstream of Yangtze River was blocked after the construction of the Gezhouba Dam hydroelectric power project in the early 1980s.

The Yangtze River Fisheries Research Institute of the Chinese Academy of Fisheries Sciences, the Institute of Hydrobiology of the Chinese Academy of Sciences, the Institute of Hydro-ecology of the Ministry of Water Resources of China, and the Chinese Sturgeon Research Institute of the Three Gorges Group have been collaboratively monitoring Chinese sturgeon spawning since the 1980s. However, from 2013 to 2014, no new spawning activity was detected and led to the belief that the Chinese sturgeon was near extinction. In 2015, juvenile Chinese sturgeon were found and showed that the Chinese sturgeon had relocated their spawning area in the Yangtze River after suspending spawning for a season.

The sturgeon is also highly sensitive to increased noise on the river caused by growing river traffic, as well as being vulnerable to death or injury by boat propellers.

== Protection and research ==
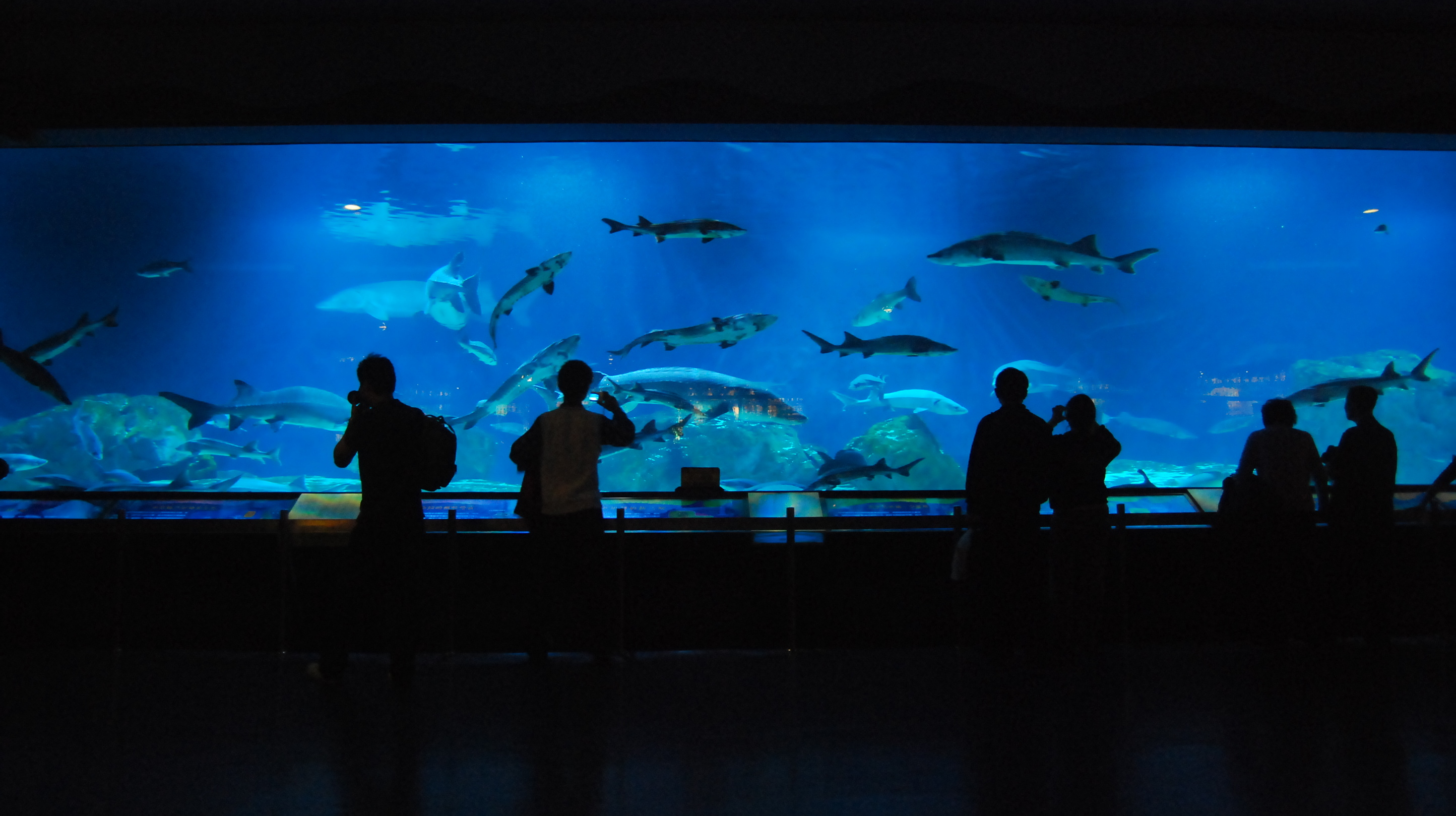
Chinese sturgeon at the Beijing Aquarium

The primitiveness of the Chinese sturgeon makes it a great academic interest in taxonomy and biology. For this reason, China has been studying ways to breed and preserve the endangered species, classified as "China's Class One Protected Animals" since the 1970s.

Built in 1982, the Chinese Sturgeon Museum is part of the Chinese Sturgeon Institution of China which is using artificial breeding techniques to try to preserve this endangered species. The museum is located on a small island called Xiaoxita in the Huangbo River, within Yiling District of Yichang.

=== Repopulation program ===
The Yangtze River Fisheries Research Institute of the Chinese Academy of Fisheries Sciences in Jingzhou is one agency charged with breeding sturgeon in captivity for restoring the river population before the species disappears.

Some success has been claimed by the authorities from artificial inducement for spawning and stream discharge for incubation. On 29 April 2005, to mark the 20th anniversary of China's efforts to protect the species, over 10,000 sturgeon fry, 200 junior sturgeon, and two adult fish were released into the Yangtze River at Yichang. During the course of the project, 5 million fish bred in captivity have been released into the wild. However, in 2007, 14 young sturgeon were surveyed near the mouth of Yangtze compared with 600 the year before, causing concern that effort was a losing battle in the crowded and polluted Yangtze river.

== See also ==
- List of endangered and protected species of China
- Panda diplomacy
