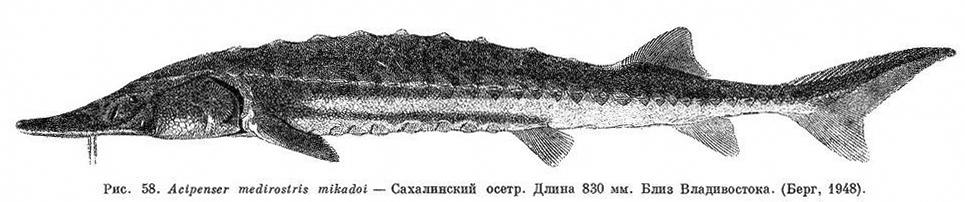
- Illustration

Conservation status
- Critically Endangered (IUCN 3.1)
- CITES Appendix II

Scientific classification
- Kingdom: Animalia
- Phylum: Chordata
- Class: Actinopterygii
- Order: Acipenseriformes
- Family: Acipenseridae
- Genus: Sinosturio
- Species: S. mikadoi

Binomial name
- Sinosturio mikadoi (Hilgendorf, 1892)

Synonyms
- Acipenser mikadoi Hilgendorf, 1892

= Sakhalin sturgeon =

Species of fish

The Sakhalin sturgeon or Mikado sturgeon (Sinosturio mikadoi) is a species of fish in the family Acipenseridae. It is found in Japan and Russia.

== Taxonomy ==
Prior to 2025, it was placed in the genus Acipenser. However, this placement was long known to be paraphyletic. In 2025, it was moved to the revived genus Sinosturio.

== Environment ==
The Sakhalin sturgeon is known to be found in either a marine or freshwater environment within demersal depth range. This species is found in brackish waters. They are also native to a tropical climate.

== Size ==
The Sakhalin sturgeon has reached the maximum recorded length of about 150 centimeters or about 59 inches.

== Biology ==
The Sakhalin sturgeon is considered to be a species that migrates up the river from the sea in order to spawn. During the months of April to May, the Sakhalin sturgeon feeds in the freshwater and then returns to the ocean during the summer. The Sakhalin sturgeon (Acipenser mikadoi), which lives in the Amur River basin in China and Russia, and the green sturgeon (A. medirostris), which lives along the Pacific coast of North America, are two different species of sturgeon. Despite their geographical isolation, these two species may have had a recent common ancestor due to the similarities in their mitochondrial genomes.

== Identification ==
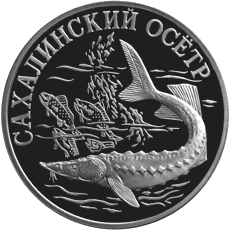
A Russian coin depicting the Sakhalin sturgeon

The Sakhalin sturgeon is recorded to be the colors of olive-green and dark green. Its sides have a yellowish white color and it includes an olive green stripe. The bottom lip of this species is split into two.

== Distribution ==
The Sakhalin sturgeon is commonly found in the Northwest Pacific, Bering Sea, Tumnin or Datta river, northern Japan, and Korea. This species currently spawns persistently in the Tumnin River.

== Threats ==
The threats that are affecting the population of the Sakhalin sturgeon include illegal poaching, trawling, accidental bycatch, pollution, and construction of dams.

Currently, the species' population is significantly decreasing and is on the brink of extinction.

== Taxonomy ==
According to recent genetic data, the differences between the mitogenomes of the Sakhalin sturgeon (Sinosturio mikadoi) and the Green sturgeon (Sinosturio medirostris) correspond to the variability at the intraspecific level. The time since the divergence of the Sakhalin sturgeon and the Green sturgeon may be approximately 160,000 years.
