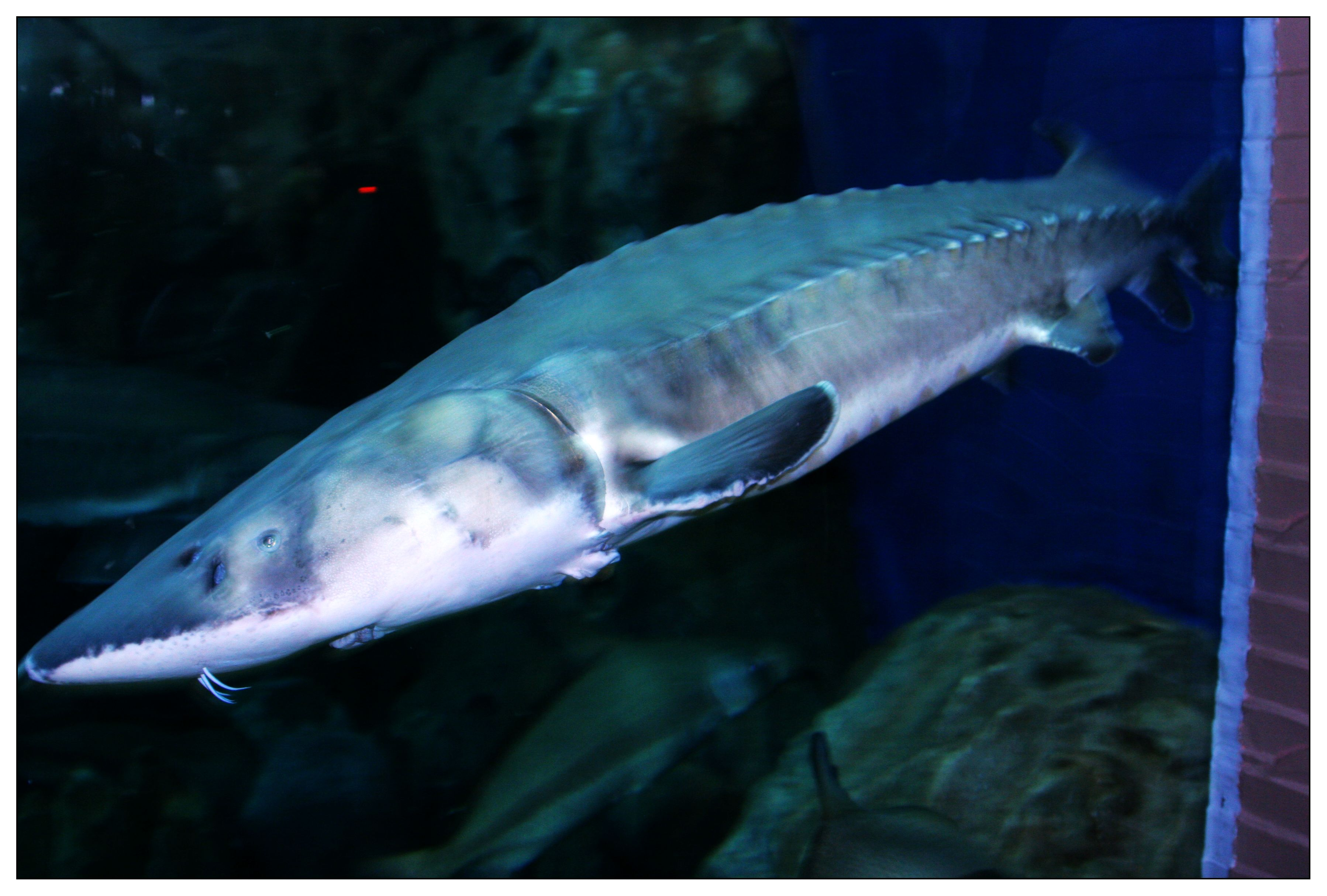
- Chinese sturgeon (S. sinensis)
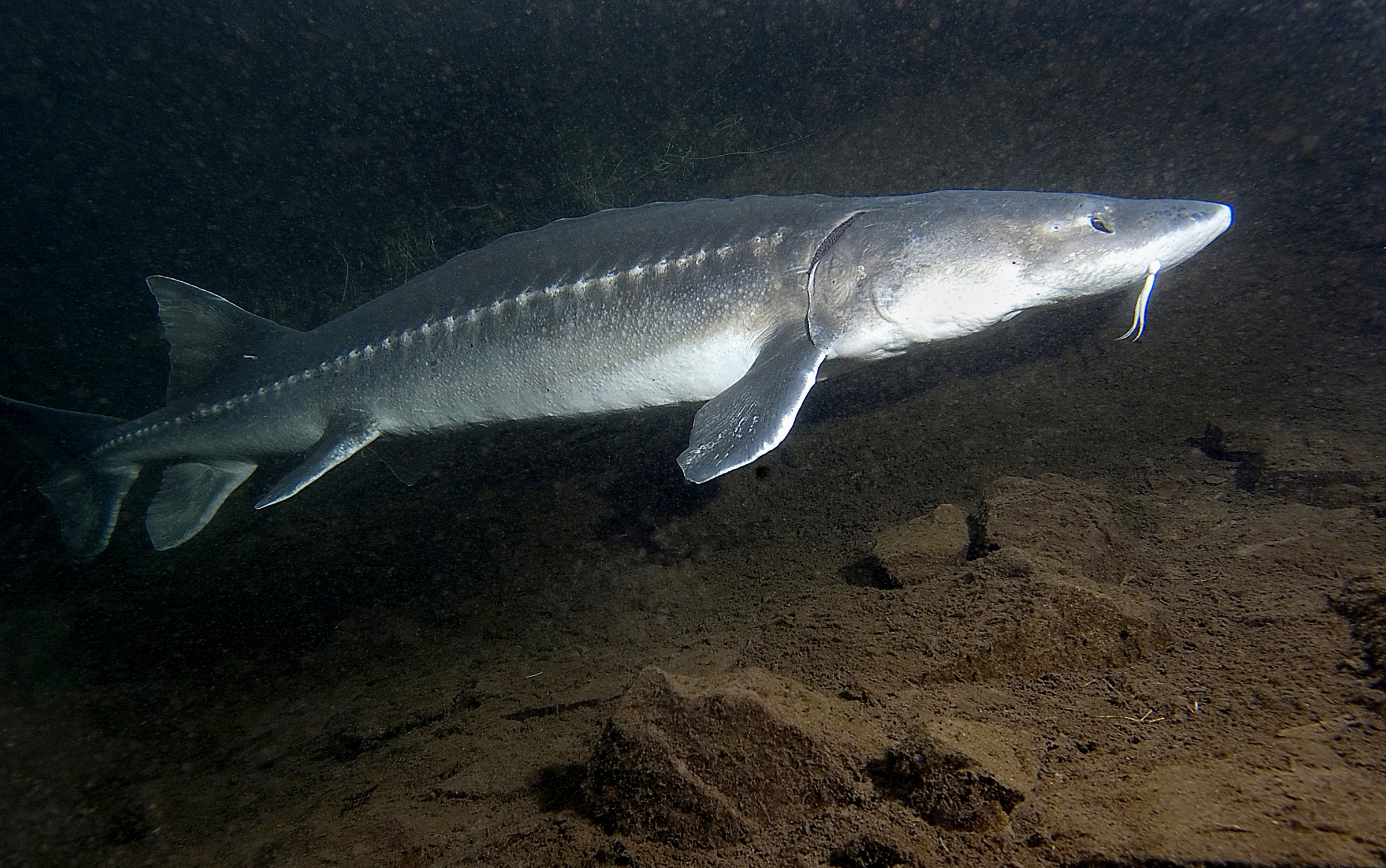
- White sturgeon S. transmontanus, one of two North American species in the genus

Scientific classification
- Kingdom: Animalia
- Phylum: Chordata
- Class: Actinopterygii
- Order: Acipenseriformes
- Family: Acipenseridae
- Genus: Sinosturio; Jaekel, 1929

Type species
- Sinosturio dabryanus Duméril, 1869

Species
- See text

Synonyms
- Acipenser (Parasinosturio) Artyukin 1995

= Sinosturio =

Genus of fishes

Sinosturio is a genus of sturgeon native to the Pacific Ocean and associated river drainages in eastern Asia and western North America.

Considered synonymous with Acipenser for nearly a century, it was revived as a distinct genus in 2025 to resolve the polyphyly of the former genus. Most species in this genus were previously placed in Acipenser, aside from the kaluga which was previously placed in Huso.

The following species are placed in this genus:

- Sinosturio dabryanus (A. H. A. Duméril, 1869) (Yangtze sturgeon)
- Sinosturio dauricus (Georgi, 1775) (kaluga)
- Sinosturio medirostris (Ayres, 1854) (green sturgeon)
- Sinosturio mikadoi (Hilgendorf, 1892) (Sakhalin sturgeon)
- Sinosturio schrenckii (J. F. Brandt, 1869) (Amur sturgeon)
- Sinosturio sinensis (J. E. Gray, 1835) (Chinese sturgeon)
- Sinosturio transmontanus (J. Richardson, 1836) (white sturgeon)
