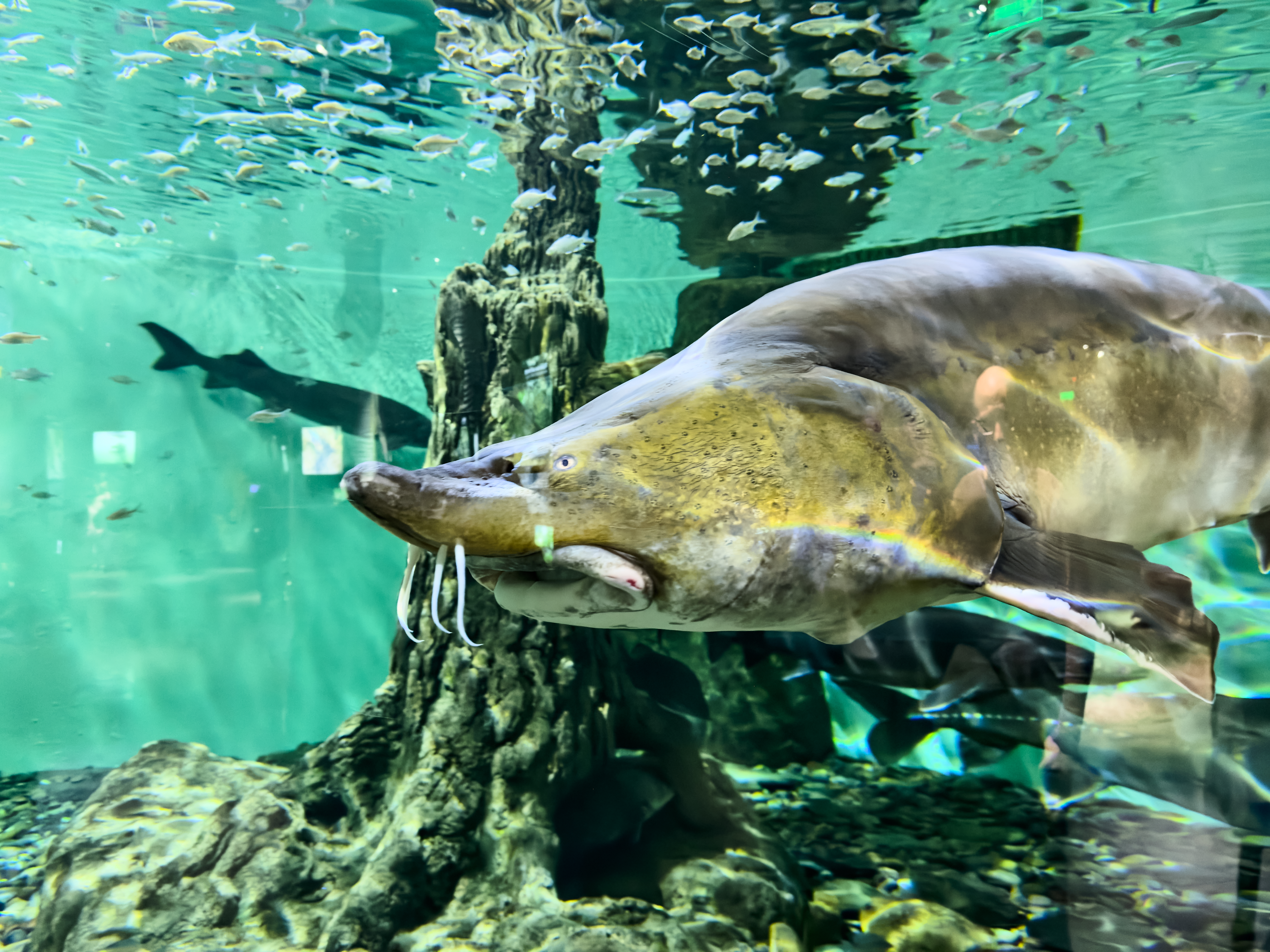
- A kaluga in the Primorsky Oceanarium
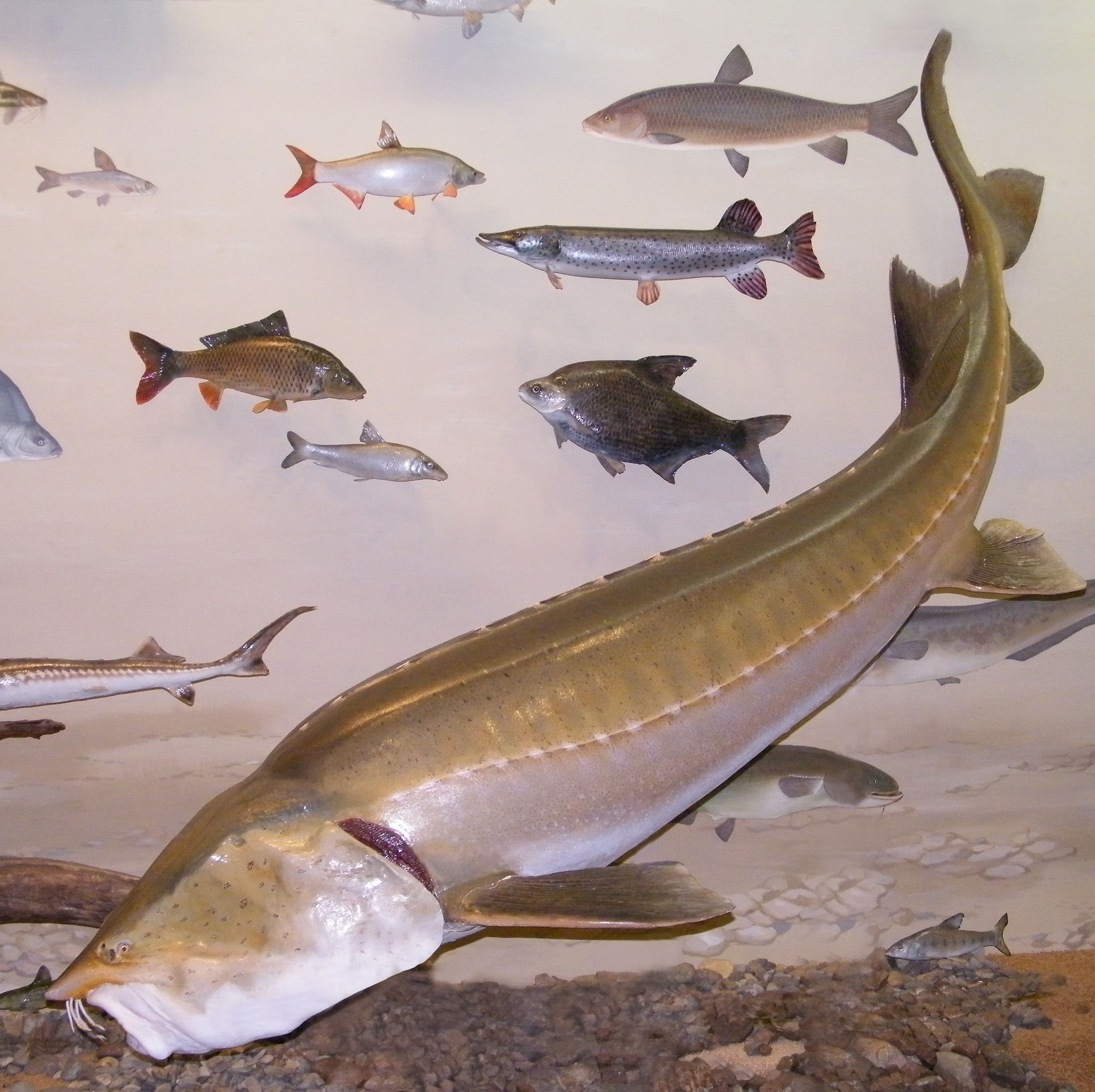
- Model/Specimen

Conservation status
- Critically Endangered (IUCN 3.1)
- CITES Appendix II

Scientific classification
- Kingdom: Animalia
- Phylum: Chordata
- Class: Actinopterygii
- Order: Acipenseriformes
- Family: Acipenseridae
- Genus: Sinosturio
- Species: S. dauricus

Binomial name
- Sinosturio dauricus (Georgi 1775)
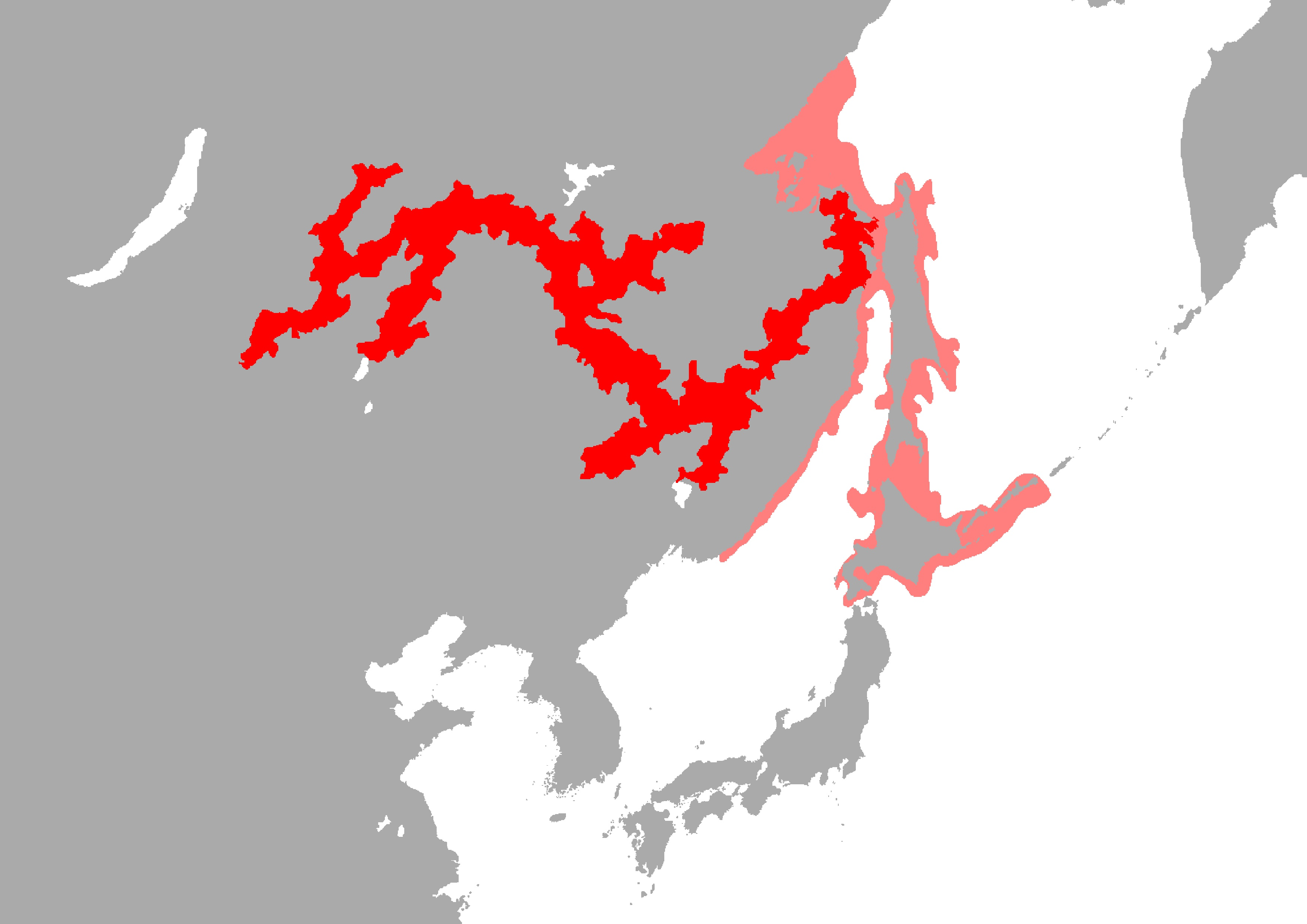

Synonyms
- List: Acipenser dauricus Georgi, 1775; Acipenser mantschuricus Basilewsky, 1855; Acipenser orientalis Pallas, 1814; Huso dauricus (Georgi, 1775); Huso orientalis (Pallas, 1814); Ichthyocolla daurica (Georgi, 1775); Acipenser kaluschka Steller, 1814

= Kaluga (fish) =

Kaluga Temporal range: Pliocene-Recent

Species of sturgeon

The kaluga (Sinosturio dauricus), also known as the kaluga sturgeon, river beluga sturgeon, is a large predatory sturgeon found in the Amur River basin from Russia to China and near Hokkaido in Japan. With a maximum size of at least 1,000 kg (2,205 lb) and 5.6 m (18 ft), the kaluga is one of the biggest of the sturgeon family. Unlike the slightly larger beluga, this fish has five major rows of dermal scutes and feeds on salmon and other fish in the Amur with nail-like teeth in its jaws. They have grey-green to black backs with a yellowish green-white underbelly. Akin to the beluga, it spends part of its life in salt water, being semi-anadromous.

The kaluga has been hunted to near extinction for its valuable roe. Despite constant anti-poaching patrols, poachers still continue to catch the fish. In Russia, illegally fishing for kaluga anywhere on the Amur River is a felony punishable by law. However, kalugas are known to have an aggressive nature, and instances of them toppling fishing boats and drowning fishermen have been reported, although no concrete evidence exists of them assaulting or hunting people.

== Taxonomy ==
Prior to 2025, it was placed in the genus Huso due to a perceived physical similarities to the beluga. However, this placement was long known to be paraphyletic. In 2025, it was moved to the revived genus Sinosturio.

== Description ==
The kaluga sturgeon is a massive fish, also known as the "river beluga sturgeon". It has a triangular head with several bony plates. Its body is an elongated fusiform body with five rows of bony scutes: a dorsal row with 10–16 elements (the first is largest), two lateral (32–46 scutes), and two ventral (8–12 scutes) between rows of small bony scutes grains and rarely more large plate. Lateral scutes are smaller than the dorsal and ventral scutes. The mouth takes up the entire lower surface of the snout; it is lateral, crescent-shaped, and extremely large. Parts of the mouth can move to the side of the head. Under the snout and in front of the mouth there is a transverse row of four flattened laterally barbels. The inner two barbels are more anterior than the outer ones, but they are similar in length. The snout of the kaluga sturgeon is short and sharply pointed. It has very small eyes, located immediately behind its nostrils.

== Habitat ==
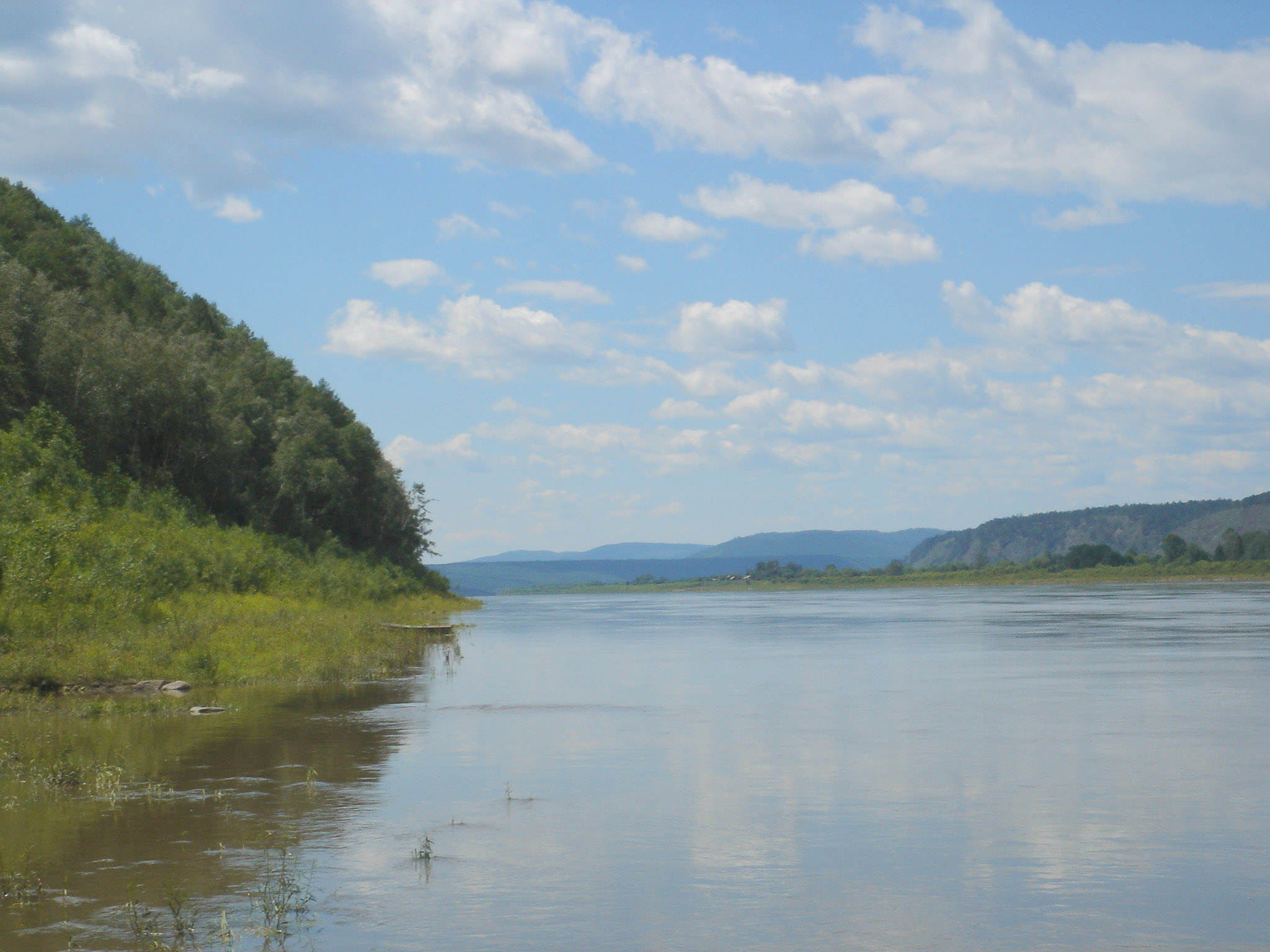
The Amur river, an important habitat for the Kaluga sturgeon.

Kaluga sturgeon are semi-anadromous, spending some of its life in salt water but most of its life in freshwater. Kalugas are one of the four species of sturgeons to exist in the Amur, which is one of the largest rivers in East Asia and for part of its length forms the border between China and Russia. There are two populations of Kaluga that exist in this river. One group of Kalugas spawn in the main stem of the river, while others spawn downstream and work their way to the middle of the river. In the early life of a Kaluga, the offspring prefer to live in a clear habitat setting. They prefer the point of the river where there is an illuminated white bottom and open space for them to swim way above the bottom of the river. The Kaluga also prefers to avoid any cover from the river. Observations suggest that the Kaluga embryos might do this to avoid predators near the bottom of the river. The Kaluga sturgeon are currently endangered now because of human interaction. However, environmental factors such as warm water temperatures pose risk for fungus over free embryos and could be a cause of death also. The migration intensity of Kaluga is also a big factor in the life of a Kaluga. Water velocity in the stream has a great effect on the migration of the free embryos, meaning that the greater the force of the stream of water is the more likely the embryo migrates. Migration plays a big role in Kaluga's early life. The migration of baby Kaluga is considered a passive migration because the embryos have no control over where the river flow takes them. However, when grown the Kaluga constantly migrates back and forth between upstream and downstream. The generation length of the species is not less than 20 years, comparable to humans.

== Biology ==
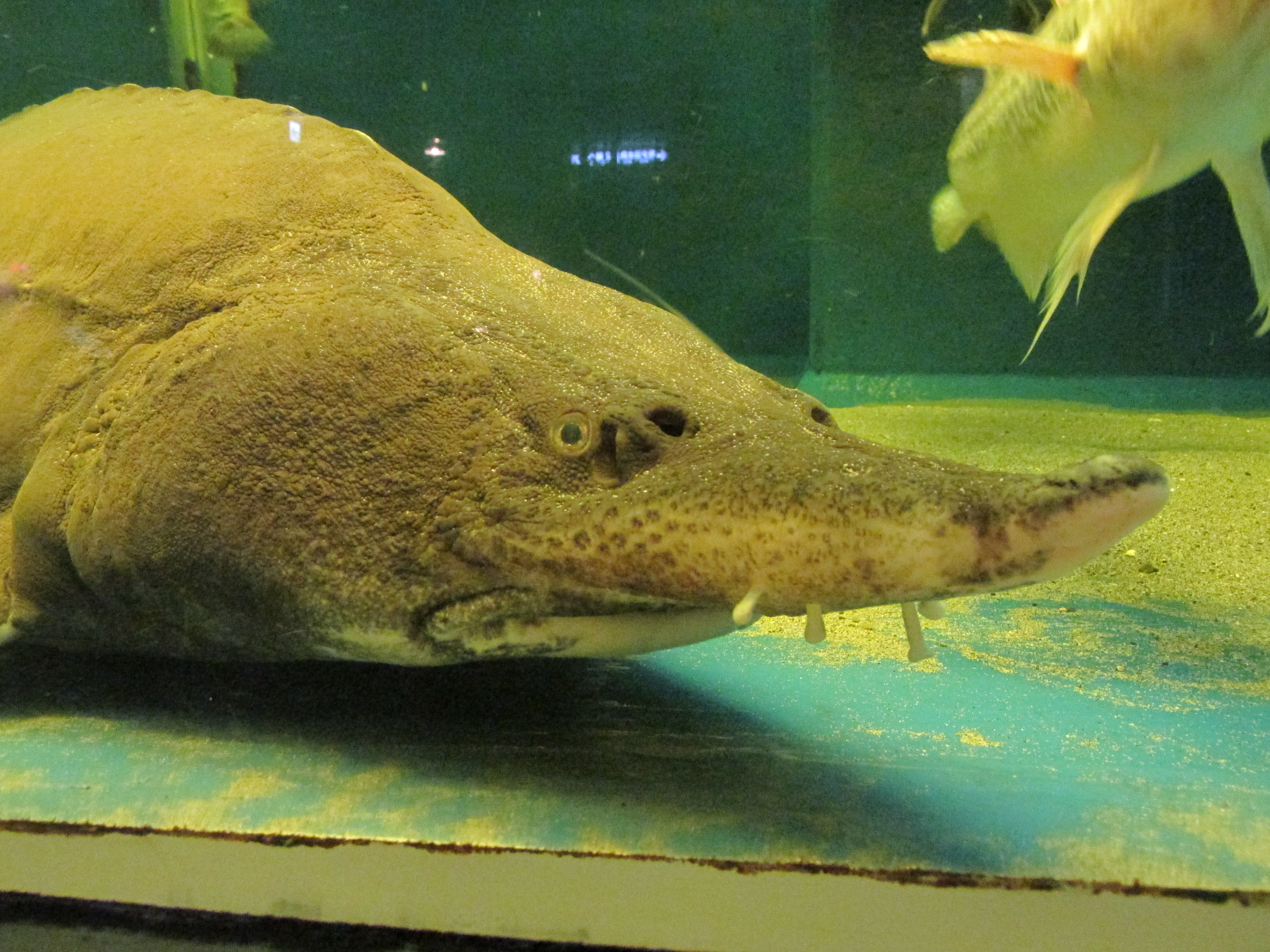
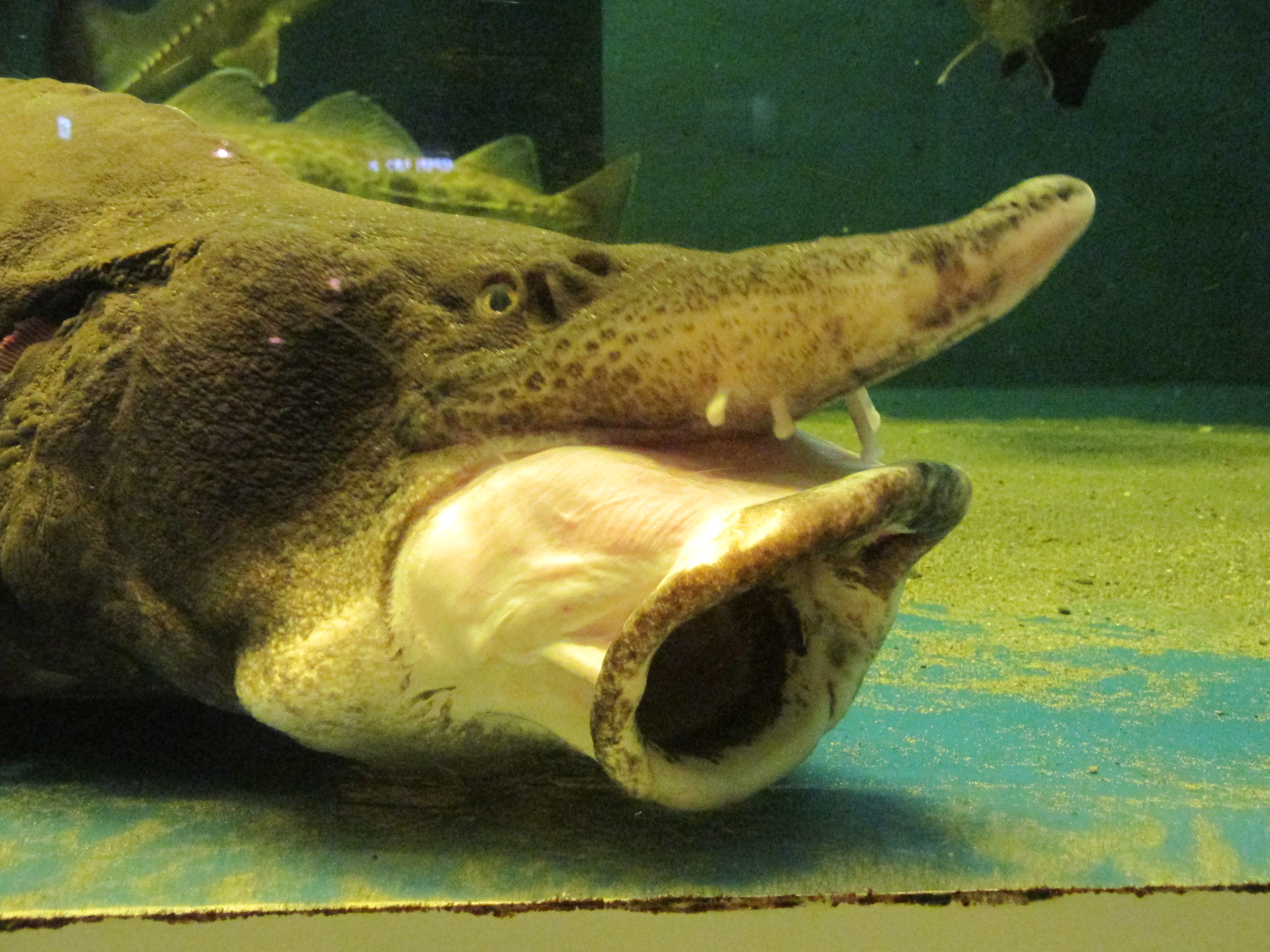
The kaluga's mouth is protrusible

Adult Kaluga Sturgeon have enormous appetites. They eat pike, carp, herring, chum or keta salmon, along with most other fish or shellfish that can fit into their mouths. A Kaluga Sturgeon can live up to 55 years.

=== Life cycle ===
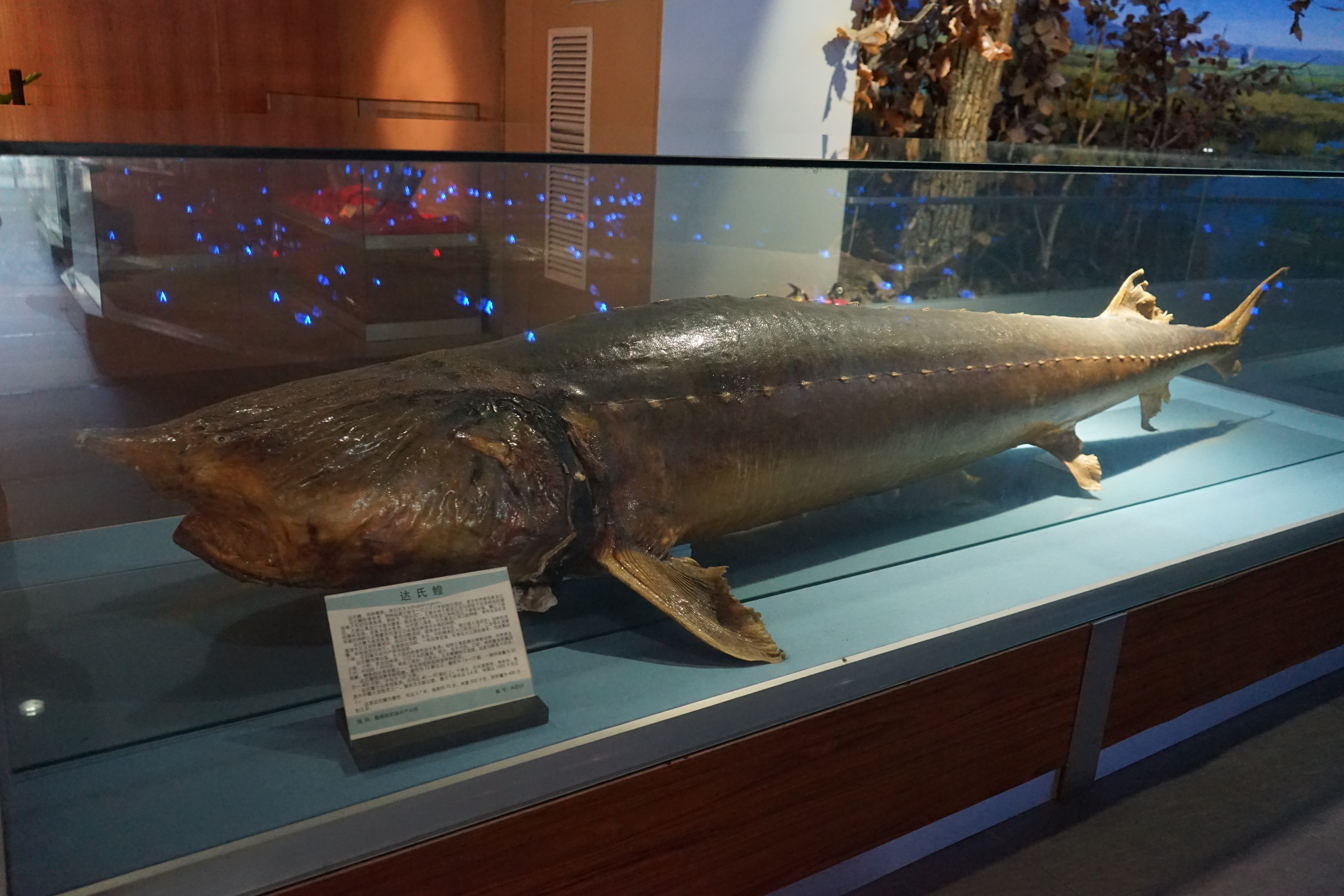
A 3.7 m (12 ft)-long, 500 kg (1,100 lb), 70 year old Kaluga fish which stored around 4 million eggs

Kaluga Sturgeon hatch in shallow gravel beds in the freshwater estuaries of the Amur River. Their parents play no role in their lives. They remain in the egg from 83 to 295 hours and hatch with a yolk sac that feeds them for up to 8 or 9 days. After that, the Kaluga sturgeon are forced to hunt. They hunt for tiny zooplankton, insects, and shrimp. They reach the sea with the help of the current and remain there until they are ready to breed, between the ages of 10 and 14.

Kaluga spends at least part of its life in salt water and returns to rivers to breed. The Kaluga Sturgeon spawns in lower reaches of the Amur River in strong-current habitats in the mainstream of the river on gravel or sandy-gravel bottom at water temperatures of 12–20 °C (54–68 °F) in depths of 2–3 m (7–10 ft). Spawning peaks from the end of May to July. Adults spawn many times during their life cycle. Spawning periodicity is 4–5 years in females and 3–4 years in males. Water temperature affects the onset of maturity of females. Females spawn a year earlier during warm years than they would during cold years. Females are only able to breed every four years. Their spawning season begins in May and ends in July. Adult Kaluga Sturgeons travel in small groups of between 3 and 20 individuals to the shallow gravel beds to spawn. Sometimes if the Kaluga Sturgeon is too large it may die from getting stuck in the shallow water. The Kaluga Sturgeon can hybridize with the Amur sturgeon.

== Conservation ==
There are a few reasons as to why exactly this species is declining. To begin with, they are being severely overfished. Ever since the 1900s, they have been poached at an alarming rate. After World War II, in 1948, 61 metric tons of Kaluga was caught, an unbelievable number for a species of their size. They are extremely vulnerable to extinction by poaching because they have late sexual maturity, which only occurs after around 6 to 25 years of age. Sturgeon Caviar output, including the Kaluga, from 1957 to 2005, averaged about 117 tons per year. The animals are being hunted down for their unfertilized eggs because sturgeon roe is considered a delicacy to people all across the world. This market cuts down on the Kaluga population and only hastens the process of their extinction. Another reason for the endangerment is river pollution, especially near spawning grounds. This has led to deformed eggs and has caused defects in birth. Hybrids between Amur sturgeon (Sinosturio schrenckii) and Kaluga have been produced in aquaculture and have found their way into the wild, where they are now frequently found and pose a threat to the native parental species.

=== Population trends ===
Data regarding the population trends of the Kaluga sturgeon is primarily based on various catch methods and efforts. The species has experienced a significant decline in catches since the late 19th century. Notably, China observed an 80% reduction in mature fish between 2008 and 2018. In the late 19th century, annual catches were around 500 tons, mainly in lower river sections, but by 1992, this had dropped to 92 tons. In 2012, the lower river's stock size was estimated at 7,100 tons. While no commercial fisheries currently target this species, it faces severe threats from illegal fishing, particularly in Russia. This combination of factors has led to an estimated decline of over 90% in just 90 years, equivalent to roughly three generations of the species.

=== Protection ===
The Convention on International Trade in Endangered Species of Wild Fauna and Flora (CITES) is an international agreement signed by 180 nations designed to ensure that international trade in animals and plants does not threaten their survival in the wild. The treaty was drafted in Washington, D.C. in 1973 and entered into force in 1975. The Kaluga is protected by Appendix II of CITES, which includes species that although currently not threatened with extinction, may become so without trade controls. Regulated trade is allowed provided that the exporting country issues a permit based on findings that the specimens were legally acquired, and the trade will not be detrimental to the survival of the species or its role in the ecosystem.

In addition, national laws have been passed to protect the Kaluga sturgeon. Commercial sturgeon fishing was prohibited in the Soviet Union during the periods 1923–1930, 1958–1976 and from 1984 to the present (Vaisman and Fomenko 2007). The Kaluga sturgeon was listed in Appendix II of the Convention on International Trade in Endangered Species of Wild Fauna and Flora (CITES) in 1998.
