= Huangbai River =

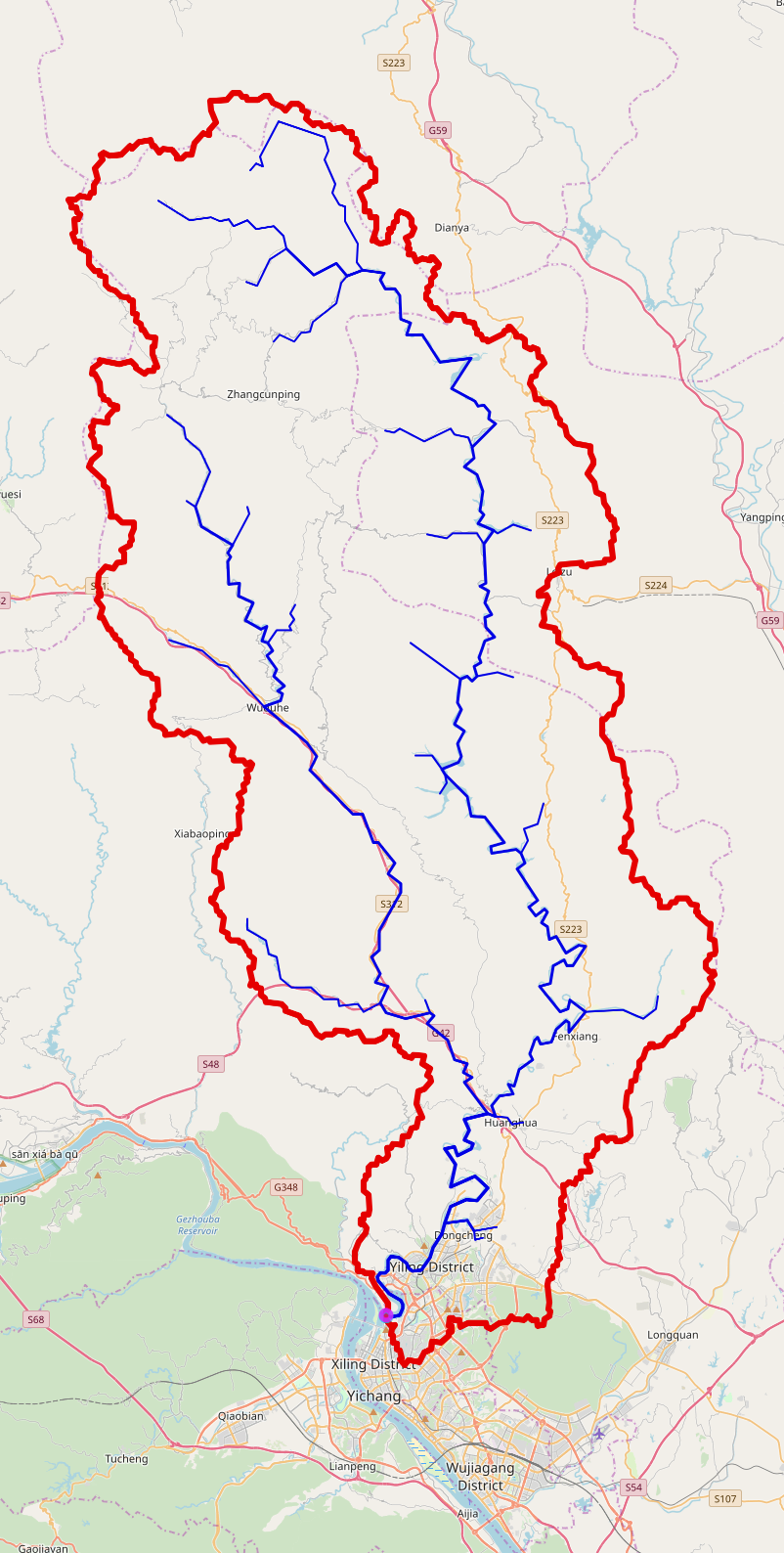
Huangbai river basin

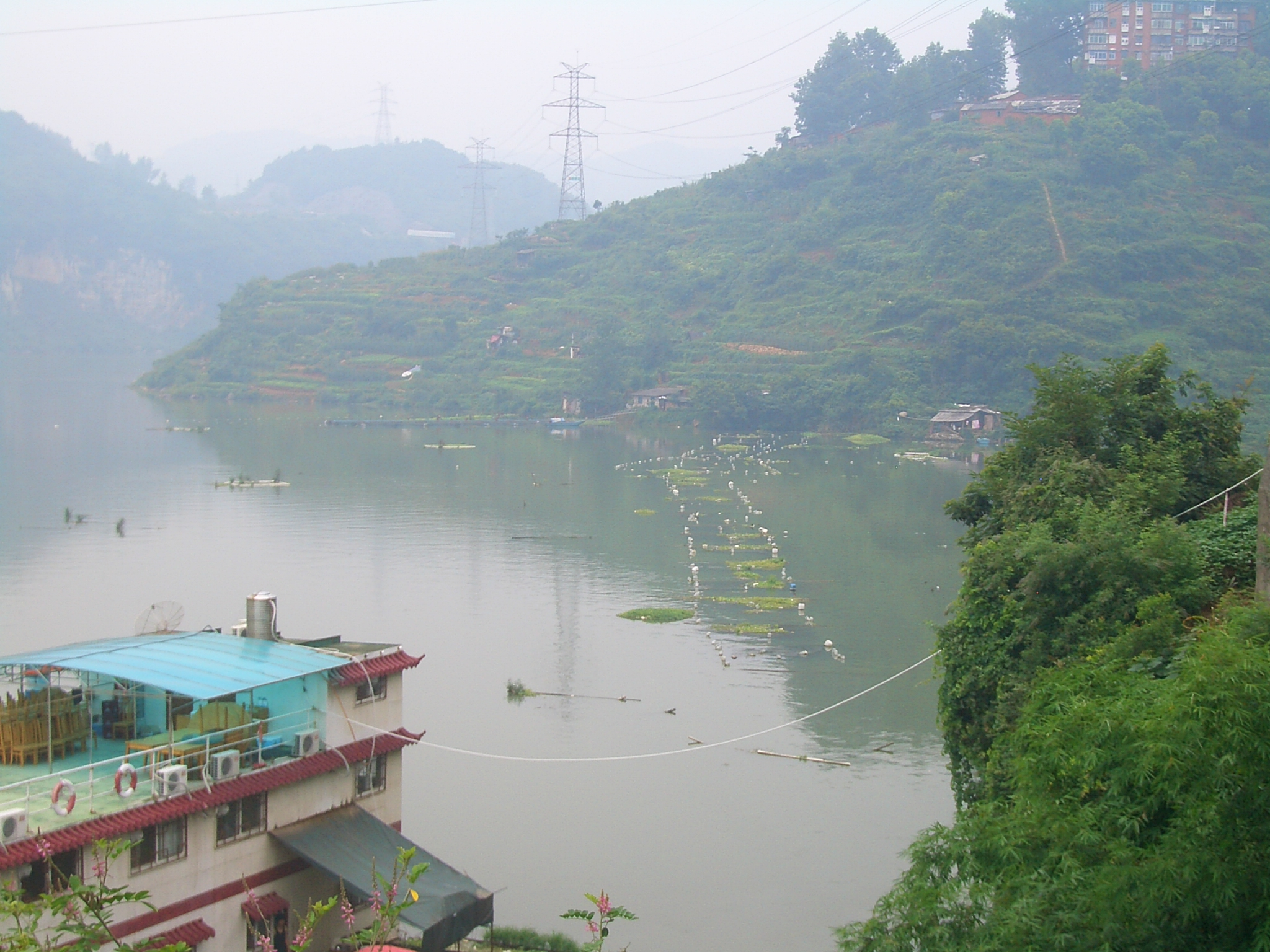
On the lower Huangbo

The Huangbai River or Huangbo River (Chinese: 黄柏河; pinyin: Huángbǎi Hé) is a river in China's Hubei Province, a left tributary of the Yangtze River. The Huangbai is located entirely within the prefecture-level city of Yichang. It flows in a southern direction through Yichang's Yiling District and Yuan'an County, to its confluence with the Yangtze, immediately upstream of the Gezhouba Dam. The water level in the river has been raised by the dam, the lowermost section of the river is now somewhat of a harbor on the Gezhouba Reservoir, with numerous wharves and shipyards.

The Chinese Sturgeon Museum, part of the Chinese Sturgeon Research Center, is located on the small Huangbai River island called Xiaoxita, within Yiling District.
