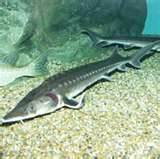

Conservation status
- Critically Endangered (IUCN 3.1)
- CITES Appendix II

Scientific classification
- Kingdom: Animalia
- Phylum: Chordata
- Class: Actinopterygii
- Order: Acipenseriformes
- Family: Acipenseridae
- Genus: Sinosturio
- Species: S. schrenckii

Binomial name
- Sinosturio schrenckii (von Brandt, 1869)

Synonyms
- Acipenser baeri schrencki von Brandt 1869; Sturio schrenckii (von Brandt 1869); Acipenser multiscutatus Tanaka 1908

= Amur sturgeon =

Critically endangered species of fish

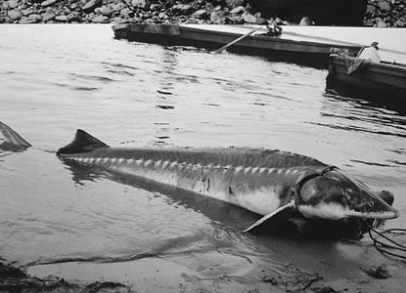
Caught adult Amur sturgeon (Sinosturio schrenckii) in the Amur river.

Sinosturio schrenckii, the Amur sturgeon, sometimes known as the Japanese sturgeon, is a freshwater species of fish in the sturgeon family. Being able to grow up to a length of 3 meters and weight of 190 kg, this species can be primarily found in its two distinct morphs of grey and brown in the Amur River and Amur Estuary. This sturgeon is a potamodromous migrator, performing their migrations through the Amur river. Due to over-fishing and caviar production, this species is currently listed as critically endangered on the IUCN red list.

== Description ==
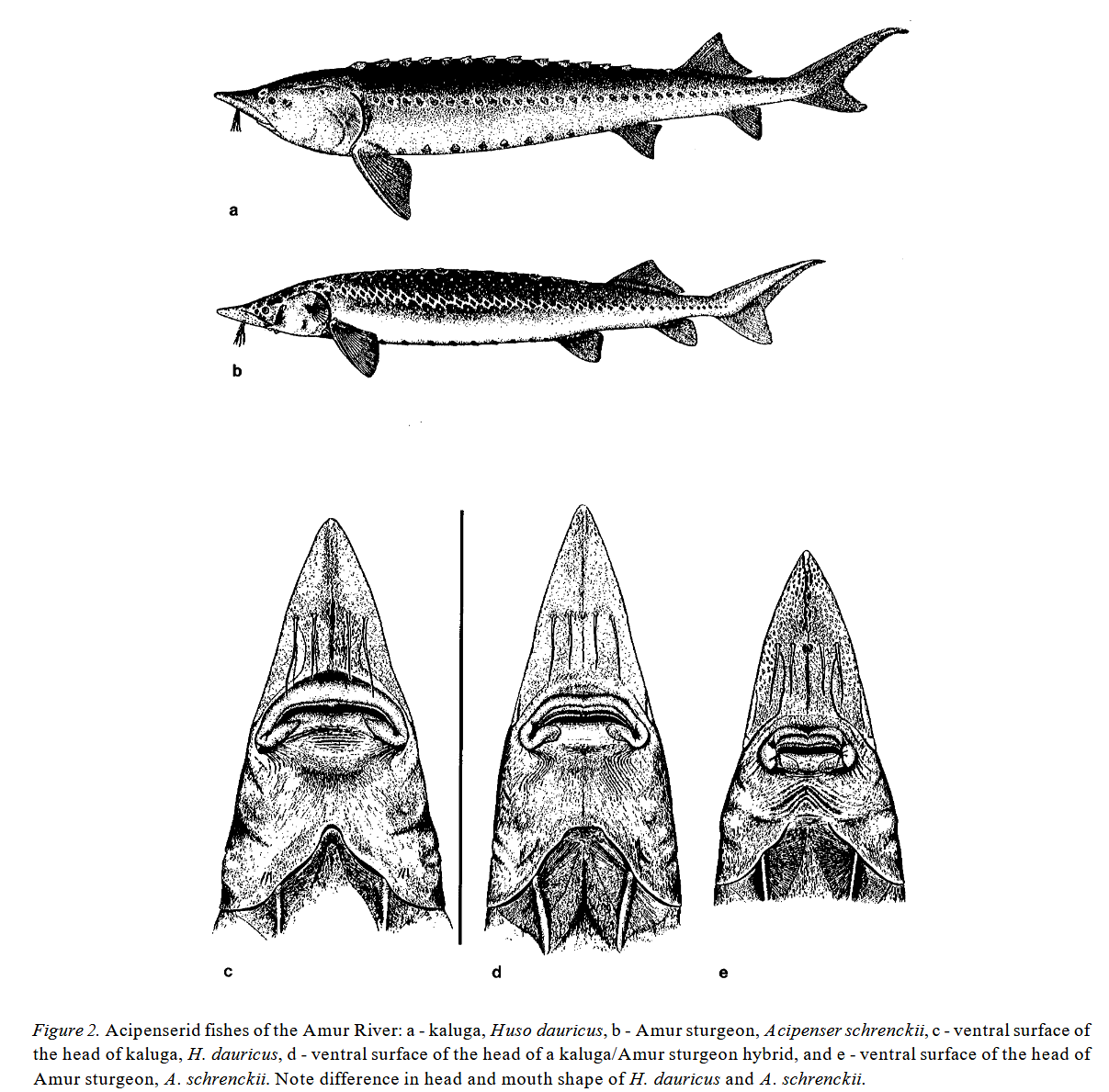
Comparison of morphological traits between Amur sturgeon (Sinosturio schrenckii), kaluga (Sinosturio dauricus), and their intermediate hybrids that can be found in the Amur river system.

Amur sturgeon are massive fish that can grow to a length of 3 meters, and achieve a weight of up to 190 kilograms, though known hybrids between the Amur sturgeon and the kaluga, a much larger species also of genus Sinosturio present in the Amur, can be found with a maximum length of 1.9 meters and a weight of 70 kilograms. Being this size, these fish have 32-47 lateral scutes, 7-9 ventral scutes, and 11-17 dorsal scutes that can be found in two distinct color morphs of grey and brown, with brown morphs being the more rare of the two. Each of their scutes can be found with spines in the center, and of the 11-17 dorsal scutes present the first dorsal scute is the largest. Sinosturio schrenckii shares many traits with other Western Pacific species within its genus, most notably being a large compressed snout, small barbels, multiple dermal skin ossifications covering the body, and a laterodorsal row of scutes. However, the Amur sturgeon lacks a lateroventral band and a fontanel in between the frontal bones that can be found in many species within Sinusturio. This species has very large pectoral fins and a long caudal peduncle that lacks oblique scale rows. The dorsal fins can range from having 38-53 fin rays while the anal fins range from 20 to 32 fin rays.

Hybrids between Amur sturgeon and kaluga are characterized by the presence of intermediate characteristics between the two species and a maximum weight of 1.9 meters and weight of 90 kilograms, these hybrids look different from their parent species to the point of being originally considered a distinct species.

== Distribution ==
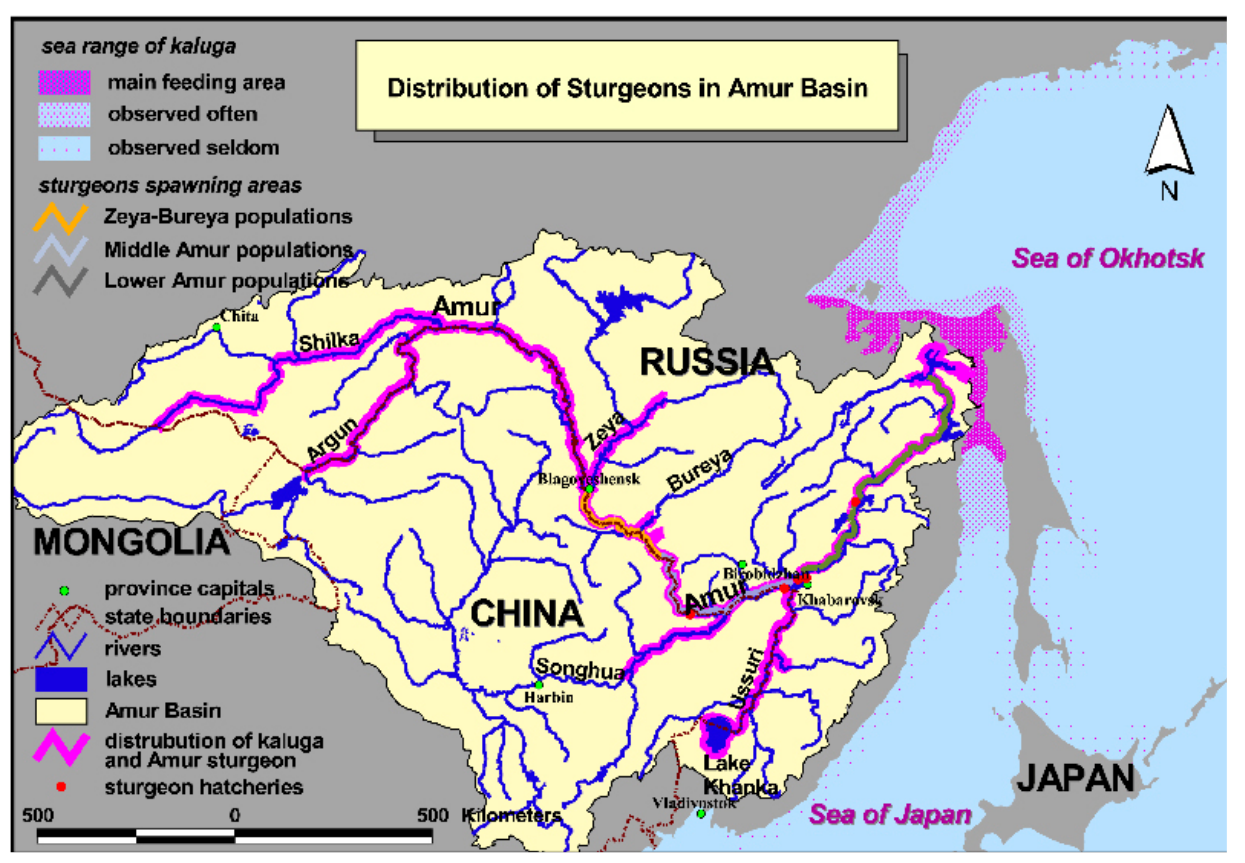
Observed range of Amur sturgeon (Sinosturio schrenckii) and kaluga (Sinosturio dauricus) within the Amur river system.

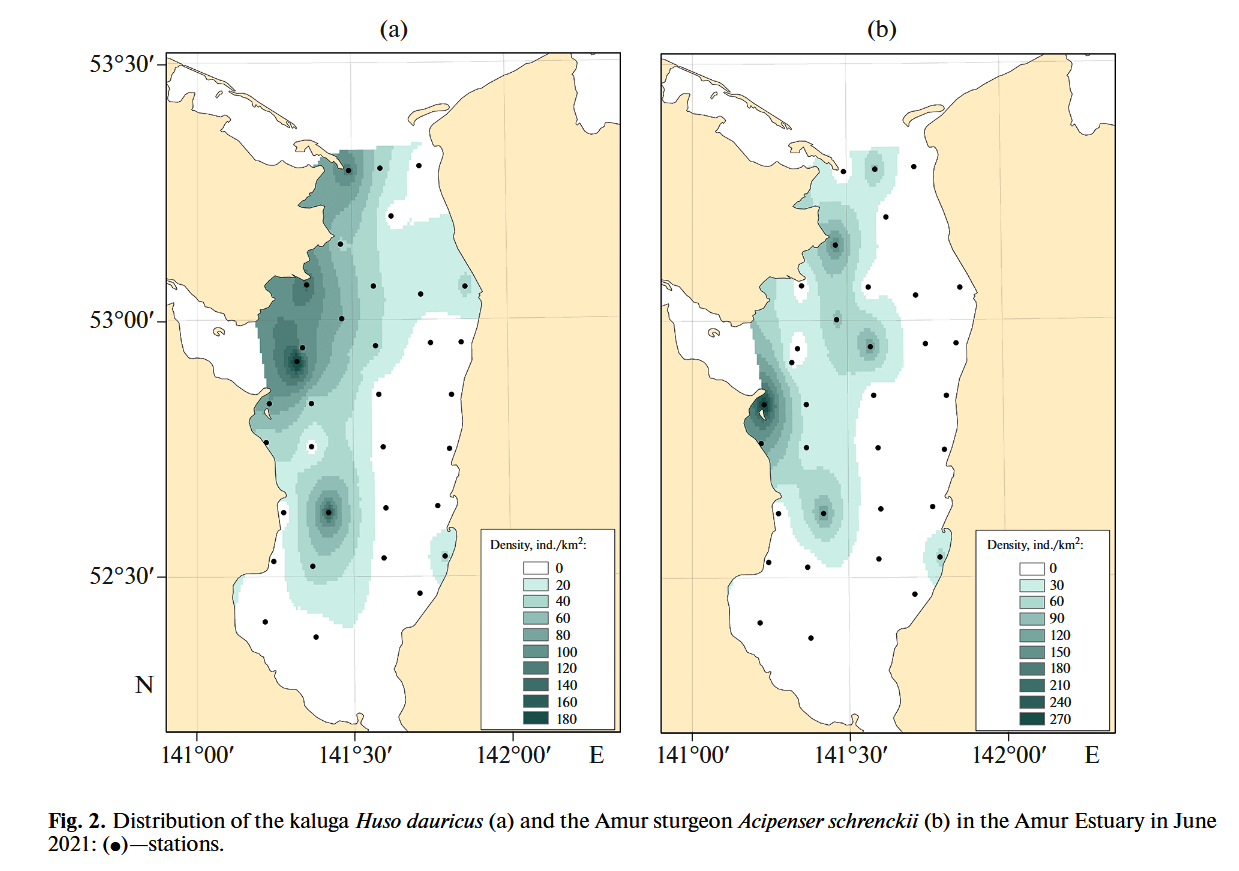
Densities of Amur sturgeon (Sinosturio schrenckii) and kaluga (Sinosturio dauricus) located by stations in the Amur estuary.

The Amur sturgeon is a freshwater fish that has a distribution almost entirely limited to the range of the Amur river, otherwise known as Heilongjang River, and Amur estuary, although a documented catch in Hokkaido, Japan has suggested that this species may make rare anadromous migrations. Within the Amur, Sinosturio schrenckii prefers areas with sandy or rocky bottoms to allow for their bottom feeder lifestyle. In the Amur river Sinosturio schrenckii are most concentrated near the mouth of the river, with the most concentrated region being 100 - 200 kilometers from the mouth. In the Amur estuary, Amur sturgeon can be primarily found in the Western and Northwestern sections, decreasing in abundance as estuary salinity increases. The Amur estuary shows a high frequency of occurrence of Amur sturgeon, with frequencies of 59.5% in 2016 and 65.8% in 2011, although their presence has begun to see declines with 2021 showing a frequency of occurrence of 37.1%.

== Life History ==
=== Diet ===
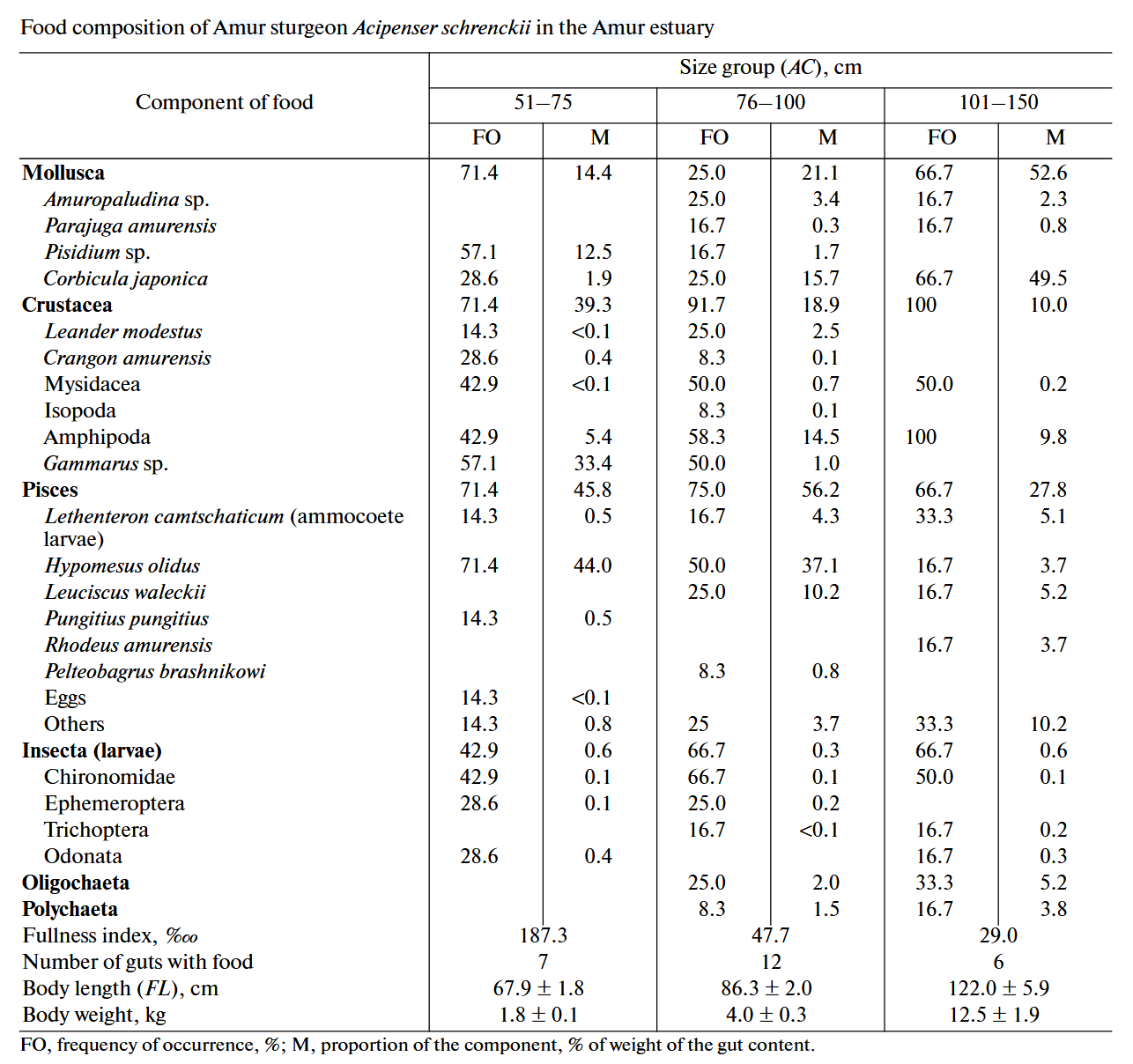
Food composition of the Amur sturgeon (Sinosturio schrenckii) diet compared by individual size.

Unlike its neighbor the kaluga, an active fish eating predator, the Amur sturgeon is a benthic feeder that can be found primarily consuming mollusks and small fish. The Amur sturgeon's diet consists of over 90% mollusks, small fish, and crustaceans and the remaining 10% content being insect larvae, oligochaetes, and polychaetes. However, the contents and primary prey changes as Amur sturgeon grow in age and size. Amur sturgeons that are less than 100 centimeters in length will typically eat small fish, most commonly the pond smelt Hypomesus olidus, as their primary source of food. Fish of this species that grow to over 100 centimeters shift over to mollusks as their primary food source, more specifically the mollusk species Japanese corbicule, C. japonica. As Amur sturgeon grow so does the importance of mollusks in their diet, as mollusks have shown an average of 87.6% of food mass in Amur sturgeons.

=== Breeding ===
Sinosturio schrenckii are potamodromous migrators, with their spawning migrations being contained in the Amur River system. Two migratory seasons are known to occur where groups of 3-5 sturgeon will migrate from the Amur estuary towards further up the Amur river. The first migratory season takes place during the summer with peaks of sturgeon migrations occurring from 16 to 20 August while the spring migratory season takes place in the spring with peaks occurring from 21 to 25 May, although most spawning migrations will occur during the summer. Males will first spawn at ages 7–8 while females first spawn at ages 9–10, when spawning males will range from lengths of 93–197 cm and weights of 4.0-40.04 kg and females will range from lengths of 95–207 cm and weights of 7.0-71.6 kg. During non-breeding seasons, Amur sturgeon will shift their distributions further downstream of the spawn sites. As the spawning seasons of Amur sturgeon and the kaluga end up in the same time period and locations, hybridization between the two species has been known to occur.

=== Growth and Development ===
Amur sturgeon start off their life cycle as free embryos, which then develop into larvae within 7 days to spend their early life in white substrate to allow for easy access of small prey. As the larvae develop, they perform strong migrations downstream the Amur river. After growing to 20mm these larvae will shift their diet towards eating invertebrates until they reach 30 days of age and an average of 42.8 mm to begin metamorphosis into juveniles.

From juvenile life onward, the growth of individuals depends on their location and even their color morph. Groups of Amur sturgeons found in the upper middle of the Amur River have been able to experience higher growth rates than groups that are found in the lower middle river, but sturgeon that are found in the Amur estuary show the highest rates of growth and largest individuals.

Likely as a result of their constrained locations, the brown morphs of Amur sturgeon also have shown to experience lower growth rates than of the grey morphs. When allowed to grow, these fish can eventually reach over 60 years of age with a currently known maximum length of 3 meters and weight of 190 kilograms.

== Conservation Status ==
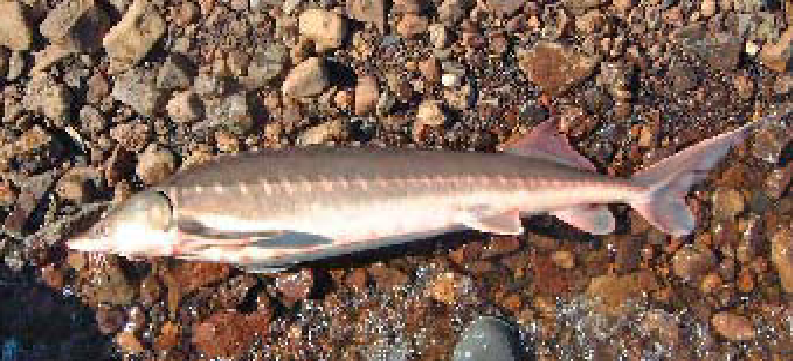
Caught individual of a brown morph Amur sturgeon (Sinosturio schrenckii) from the Amur river.

As of 2022 the Amur sturgeon is currently listed as a critically endangered species on the IUCN Red List and their numbers only continue to lower. This species has been threatened for multiple decades now, primarily as a result of over-fishing and population depletion. This is because the Amur sturgeon and kaluga are the only Acipenseriformes within the Amur river, making their eggs and meat a highly prized commodity and a strong commercial importance for the Chinese caviar industry. Fishing for their species has occurred since the late 1800s, but the industry saw its true peaks in the 1980s with a combined 26 metric tonnes of kaluga and Amur sturgeon caviar being produced alone in 1987. However, due to efforts placed by the Heilongjiang Provincial government, caviar production of this species has lowered to a range of 6.46 to 9.16 metric tonnes per year since 1992.

In an effort to preserve this species, while also allowing for the industry for this fish to continue, the provincial government put efforts to limit the fishing of the Amur sturgeon by lowering the number of issued fishing licenses every year. Other efforts towards preservation of this species include the limitation of fishing periods to January 1 to June 10 and July 21 to the end of the year and limiting the allowed capture size of sturgeon to lengths and weights above 1 meter and 4 kilograms. Both Russia and China have made efforts towards captive breeding and artificial propagation, resulting in 8.45 million Amur sturgeon fry being released into the Amur river by 2005. Though despite these efforts, the Amur sturgeon population has shown to consistently decline in numbers, and reported ages of caught sturgeon have shown to become younger annually.
