= Gezhouba Dam =

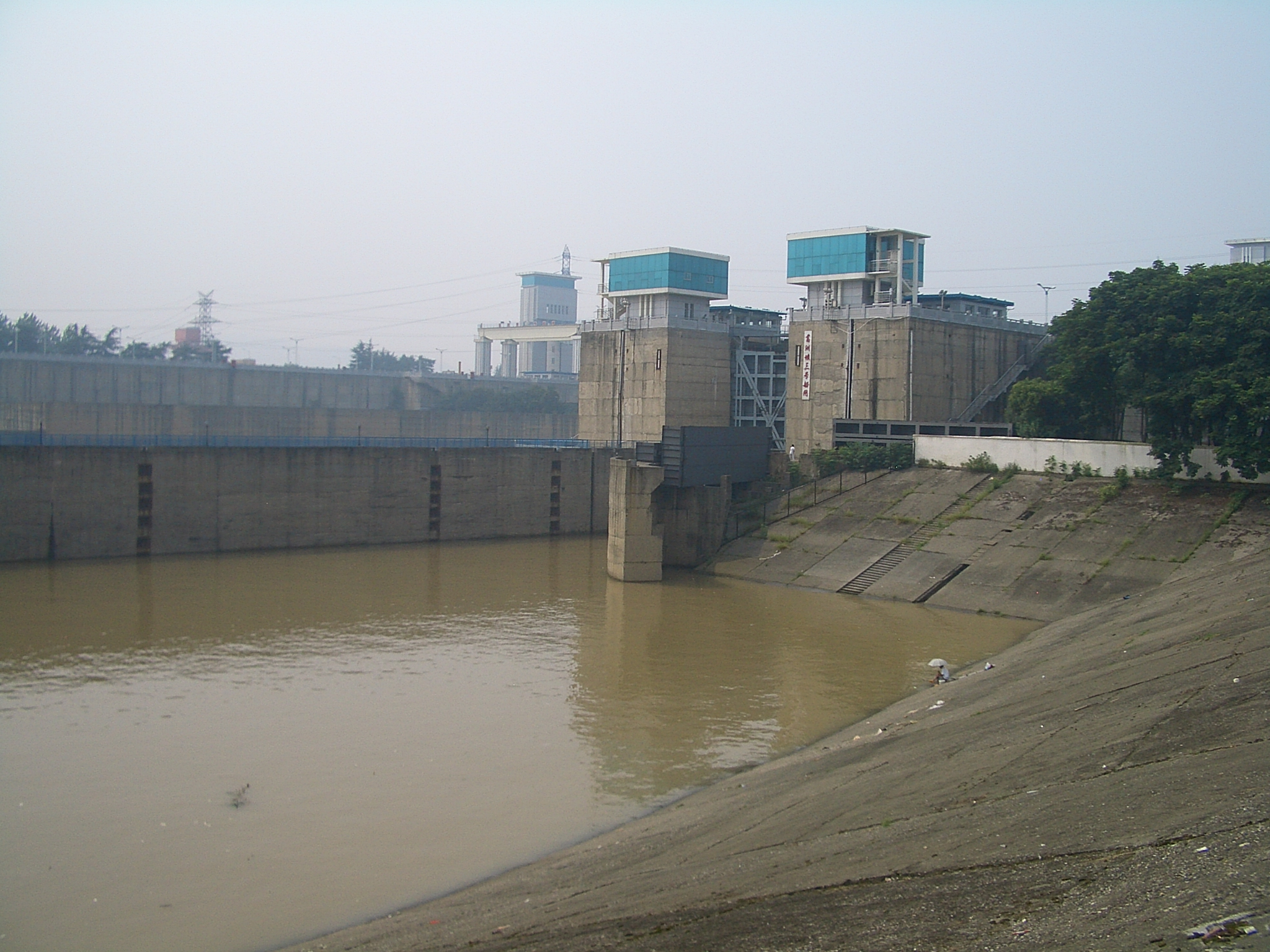
- The Gezhouba Dam site
- Interactive map of Gezhouba Dam
- Location: Yichang, China
- Construction began: 1970
- Opening date: 1981 (first generator); 1988 (construction completed)

Dam and spillways
- Type of dam: Concrete gravity, run-of-the-river
- Impounds: Yangtze River
- Height: 47 m (154 ft)
- Length: 2,595 m (8,514 ft)

Reservoir
- Total capacity: 1.58 km^{3} (1,280,000 acre⋅ft)

Power Station
- Operator: China Yangtze Power
- Type: Run-of-the-river
- Installed capacity: 2,715 MW
- Annual generation: 14,100 GWh

Gezhouba Dam
- Traditional Chinese: 長江葛洲壩水利樞紐工程
- Simplified Chinese: 长江葛洲坝水利枢纽工程
- Literal meaning: Yangtze River Gezhouba Water Control Hub Project
Transcriptions
Standard Mandarin
- Hanyu Pinyin: Chángjiāng Gězhōubà shuǐlì shūniǔ gōngchéng

The Gezhouba Dam or Gezhouba Water Control Project (Chinese: 长江葛洲坝水利枢纽工程) on the Yangtze River is located in the western suburbs of Yichang, in central China's Hubei province. One of the largest run-of-the-river dams, it sits several kilometers upstream from downtown Yichang, just downstream of the fall of the Huangbo River into the Yangtze. Construction started on December 30, 1970 and ended on December 11, 1988. The dam has a total installed electricity generation capacity of 2,715 MW.

After rushing out of the Xiling Gorge, the last of the Three Gorges, at Nanjin Pass (南津关), the Yangtze River slows down and widens from 300 metres (980 ft) to about 2,200 metres (7,200 ft) at the dam site, about 3 kilometres (1.9 mi) downstream. Two small islands, Gezhouba and Xiba, divided the river into three channels. There, the Gezhouba Project was built.

The facility boasts a generating capacity of 2.71 GW along with three ship locks, and two power stations that generate 14,100 GWh of electricity annually. It has 27 gates of spillway, and a non-flowing dam on both banks. The dam is 2,595 metres (8,514 ft) long with a maximum height of 47 metres (154 ft). The reservoir has a total volume of 1.58 cubic kilometres (1,280,000 acre⋅ft).

The navigation lock No. 2 on the third channel was, when built, among the 100 largest in the world. The lock chamber is 280 metres (920 ft) long and 34 metres (112 ft) wide, with a minimum draft of 5 metres (16 ft) at the sill. It provides passage for 10,000 ton ships.

The construction of the Gezhouba Dam, and others on the Yangtze, is considered by scientists to be one of the main causes of the decline and extinction of the Chinese paddlefish.

== See also ==
- List of power stations in China
