= 2022 in paleoichthyology =

This list of fossil fish research presented in 2022 is a list of new fossil taxa of jawless vertebrates, placoderms, cartilaginous fishes, bony fishes, and other fishes that were described during the year, as well as other significant discoveries and events related to paleoichthyology that occurred in 2022.

== Jawless vertebrates ==
=== New jawless vertebrate taxa ===
Name	Novelty	Status	Authors	Age	Type locality	Location	Notes	Images
Aenigmaspis	Gen. et sp. nov	Valid	Thorsteinsson & Elliott	Silurian (Wenlock)	Cape Phillips Formation (Cornwallis Island)	Canada	A member of Pteraspidomorphi. Genus includes new species A. falcata.	
Anjiaspis ericius	Sp. nov	In press	Shan et al.	Silurian (Telychian)	Qingshui Formation	China	A member of Eugaleaspidiformes.	
Anomalaspis	Gen. et sp. nov		Thorsteinsson & Elliott			Canada	A member of Traquairaspidiformes belonging to the family Traquairaspididae. Genus includes new species A. lacruma. The generic name is shared with Anomalaspis Brennan (1952).	
Archegonaspis cornwallisensis	Sp. nov	Valid	Thorsteinsson & Elliott			Canada	A member of the family Cyathaspididae.	
Arctictenaspis borealis	Sp. nov	Valid	Thorsteinsson & Elliott			Canada	A member of the family Ctenaspidae.	
Ariaspis cristata	Sp. nov	Valid	Thorsteinsson & Elliott			Canada	A member of the family Ariaspidae.	
Ariaspis majuscula	Sp. nov	Valid	Thorsteinsson & Elliott			Canada	A member of the family Ariaspidae.	
Ariaspis multijubata	Sp. nov	Valid	Thorsteinsson & Elliott			Canada	A member of the family Ariaspidae.	
Ariaspis nassichuki	Sp. nov	Valid	Thorsteinsson & Elliott			Canada	A member of the family Ariaspidae.	
Ariaspis perryi	Sp. nov	Valid	Thorsteinsson & Elliott			Canada	A member of the family Ariaspidae.	
Canadapteraspis formosa	Sp. nov	Valid	Thorsteinsson & Elliott			Canada	A member of the family Protopteraspididae.	
Canadapteraspis uniformis	Sp. nov	Valid	Thorsteinsson & Elliott			Canada	A member of the family Protopteraspididae.	
Corvaspis ellesmerensis	Sp. nov	Valid	Thorsteinsson & Elliott			Canada	A member of Heterostraci belonging to the group Corvaspidiformes and the family Corvaspididae.	
Corvaspis porphyretica	Sp. nov	Valid	Thorsteinsson & Elliott			Canada	A member of Heterostraci belonging to the group Corvaspidiformes and the family Corvaspididae.	
Corvaspis woodwardi	Sp. nov	Valid	Thorsteinsson & Elliott			Canada	A member of Heterostraci belonging to the group Corvaspidiformes and the family Corvaspididae.	
Denisonaspis	Gen. et sp. nov	Valid	Thorsteinsson & Elliott			Canada	A member of the family Protopteraspididae. Genus includes new species D. borea.	
Dinaspidella elegans	Sp. nov	Valid	Thorsteinsson & Elliott			Canada	A member of the family Cyathaspididae.	
Dinaspidella tenuicostata	Sp. nov	Valid	Thorsteinsson & Elliott			Canada	A member of the family Cyathaspididae.	
Eumorphaspis	Gen. et comb. et 3 sp. nov	Valid	Thorsteinsson & Elliott			Canada	A member of the family Cyathaspididae. Genus includes E. borealis (Denison, 1963), as well as new species E. goodsiri, E. lata and E. solitaria.	
Geissonaspis	Gen. et sp. nov	Valid	Thorsteinsson & Elliott			Canada	A member of Heterostraci belonging to the group Cyathaspidiformes. Genus includes new species G. mutabilis.	
Genetaspis	Gen. et sp. nov	Valid	Thorsteinsson & Elliott			Canada	A member of Heterostraci belonging to the group Cyathaspidiformes and the family Jarvikaspididae. Genus includes new species G. incohata.	
Hebeimyzon	Gen. et sp. nov	Valid	Guo	Early Cretaceous (Barremian–Aptian)	Jiufotang Formation	China	A lamprey. Genus includes new species H. weichangensis.	
Idanaspis	Gen. et 2 sp. nov	Valid	Thorsteinsson & Elliott			Canada	A member of Heterostraci. Genus includes new species I. dimidiata and I. reinsoni.	
Jarvikaspis	Gen. et 2 sp. nov	Valid	Thorsteinsson & Elliott			Canada	A member of Heterostraci belonging to the group Cyathaspidiformes; the type genus of the new family Jarvikaspididae. Genus includes new species J. arctica and J. mauryensis.	
Jiangxialepis jiujiangensis	Sp. nov	In press	Shan, Zhao & Gai	Silurian (Telychian)	Qingshui Formation	China	A member of Eugaleaspidiformes.	
Kyphaspis	Gen. et sp. nov	Valid	Thorsteinsson & Elliott			Canada	A member of the family Cyathaspididae. Genus includes new species K. boothiaensis.	
Nahanniaspis mclintocki	Sp. nov	Valid	Thorsteinsson & Elliott			Canada	A member of the family Cyathaspididae.	
Orthogoniaspis	Gen. et 2 sp. nov	Valid	Thorsteinsson & Elliott			Canada	A member of Heterostraci belonging to the group Weigeltaspidiformes and the family Weigeltaspididae. Genus includes new species O. magnijubata and O. loefflerae.	
Paralaspis	Gen. et sp. nov	Valid	Thorsteinsson & Elliott			Canada	A member of the family Cyathaspididae. Genus includes new species P. franklini.	
Pionaspis ebenina	Sp. nov	Valid	Thorsteinsson & Elliott			Canada	A member of the family Cyathaspididae.	
Pionaspis rossi	Sp. nov	Valid	Thorsteinsson & Elliott			Canada	A member of the family Cyathaspididae.	
Prionotaspis	Gen. et 2 sp. nov	Valid	Thorsteinsson & Elliott			Canada	A member of the family Cyathaspididae. Genus includes new species P. miranda and possibly P? abbottensis.	
Prosobranchiaspis	Gen. et 2 sp. nov	Valid	Thorsteinsson & Elliott			Canada	A member of the family Cyathaspididae. Genus includes new species P. prolatata and P. smithbayensis.	
Pseudoanglaspis	Gen. et 2 sp. nov	Valid	Thorsteinsson & Elliott			Canada	A member of the family Cyathaspididae. Genus includes new species P. aquilonaris and P. minima.	
Qingshuiaspis	Gen. et sp. nov	In press	Shan et al.	Silurian (Telychian)	Qingshui Formation	China	A member of Eugaleaspidiformes belonging to the family Shuyuidae. The type species is Q. junqingi.	
Rimasventeraspis? halsteadi	Sp. nov	Valid	Thorsteinsson & Elliott			Canada	A member of Heterostraci belonging to the group Natlaspidiformes and the family Rimasventeraspididae.	
Rimasventeraspis? septentrionalis	Sp. nov	Valid	Thorsteinsson & Elliott			Canada	A member of Heterostraci belonging to the group Natlaspidiformes and the family Rimasventeraspididae.	
Soehnaspis	Gen. et sp. nov	Valid	Thorsteinsson & Elliott			Canada	A member of Heterostraci belonging to the group Cyathaspidiformes. Genus includes new species S. polaris.	
Teleaspis	Gen. et sp. nov	Valid	Thorsteinsson & Elliott			Canada	A member of the family Cyathaspididae. Genus includes new species T. tersa.	
Thuleaspis	Gen. et sp. nov	Valid	Thorsteinsson & Elliott			Canada	A member of Heterostraci belonging to the group Cyathaspidiformes and the family Jarvikaspididae. Genus includes new species T. canadensis.	
Toraspis	Gen. et sp. nov	Valid	Thorsteinsson & Elliott			Canada	A member of Heterostraci belonging to the group Weigeltaspidiformes; the type genus of the new family Toraspididae. Genus includes new species T. somersetensis.	
Traquairaspis longicarinata	Sp. nov	Valid	Thorsteinsson & Elliott			Canada	A member of Traquairaspidiformes belonging to the family Traquairaspididae.	
Traquairaspis pristina	Sp. nov	Valid	Thorsteinsson & Elliott			Canada	A member of Traquairaspidiformes belonging to the family Traquairaspididae.	
Trygonaspis	Gen. et sp. nov	Valid	Thorsteinsson & Elliott			Canada	A member of the family Protopteraspididae. Genus includes new species T. sicula.	
Tujiaaspis	Gen. et sp. nov	Valid	Gai et al.	Silurian (Telychian)	Huixingshao Formation	China	A member of Eugaleaspidiformes; the anatomy of its articulated remains indicates that galeaspids possessed three unpaired dorsal fins, an approximately symmetrical hypochordal tail and a pair of continuous ventrolateral fins. The type species is T. vividus.	
Vernonaspis magna	Sp. nov	Valid	Thorsteinsson & Elliott			Canada	A member of the family Cyathaspididae.	
Vernonaspis parryi	Sp. nov	Valid	Thorsteinsson & Elliott			Canada	A member of the family Cyathaspididae.	
Vernonaspis suffusca	Sp. nov	Valid	Thorsteinsson & Elliott			Canada	A member of the family Cyathaspididae.	
Westollaspis	Gen. et 3 sp. nov	Valid	Thorsteinsson & Elliott			Canada	A member of Heterostraci belonging to the group Corvaspidiformes; the type genus of the new family Westollaspididae. Genus includes new species W. hyperborea, W. cordata and W. gigas.	
Whiteaspis	Gen. et sp. nov	Valid	Thorsteinsson & Elliott			Canada	A member of Traquairaspidiformes belonging to the family Traquairaspididae. Genus includes new species W. spinifera.	
Xitunaspis	Gen. et sp. nov	Valid	Sun et al.	Devonian (Lochkovian)	Xitun Formation	China	A member of Eugaleaspidiformes belonging to the family Eugaleaspidae. The type species is X. magnus.	
Yongdongaspis	Gen. et sp. nov	Valid	Chen et al.	Silurian (Llandovery)	Huixingshao Formation	China	A member of Eugaleaspidiformes. Genus includes new species Y. littoralis.	

=== Jawless vertebrate research ===
- A study on the phylogenetic relationships and evolutionary history of lampreys is published by Brownstein & Near (2022), who find Mesomyzon mengae to be a member of the lamprey crown group, and argue that living lamprey biodiversity results from diversifications extending from the Cretaceous to present, rather than gradually accumulating since the Paleozoic.
- Chevrinais et al. (2022) describe the ontogeny of Euphanerops longaevus.
- Meng et al. (2022) describe new fossil material of Pterogonaspis yuhaii from the Devonian Xujiachong Formation (Yunnan, China), providing new information on the cranial anatomy of this galeaspid, including the first fossil evidence for the position of the esophagus in galeaspids.
- The first detailed description of the complex of external endolymphatic structures in headshields of members of the genus Tremataspis from the Silurian of Estonia, with tiny platelets located within the openings of the endolymphatic duct and possibly functioning as a sieve that allowed or prevented material from entering the inner ear, is published by Märss, Wilson & Viljus (2022).

== Placoderms ==
=== New placoderm taxa ===
Name	Novelty	Status	Authors	Age	Type locality	Location	Notes	Images
Amazichthys	Gen. et sp. nov	Valid	Jobbins et al.	Devonian (Famennian)		Morocco	A member of the family Selenosteidae. The type species is A. trinajsticae.	
Xiushanosteus	Gen. et sp. nov	Valid	Zhu, Li, Ahlberg & Zhu in Zhu et al.	Silurian (Telychian)	Huixingshao Formation	China	The type species is X. mirabilis.	

=== Placoderm research ===
- A study on the morphology and function of the antiarch jaw apparatus is published by Lebedev et al. (2022).
- Wang & Zhu (2022) describe the squamation and scale morphology of Parayunnanolepis xitunensis, recognize at least thirteen morphotypes of scales in P. xitunensis, and interpret their findings as indicative of the high regionalization of squamation at the root of jawed vertebrates.
- Zhu et al. (2022) redescribe the pelvic region of the holotype of Parayunnanolepis xitunensis, and report that, instead of having two large plates previously designated as dermal pelvic girdles, P. xitunensis had three pairs of lateral pelvic plates and one large oval median pelvic plate.
- Trinajstic et al. (2022) report preservation of a three-dimensionally mineralized heart, thick-walled stomach and bilobed liver from members of Arthrodira from the Devonian Gogo Formation (Australia), and interpret this finding as indicative of the presence of a flat S-shaped heart separated from the liver and other abdominal organs, and of the absence of lungs in members of Arthrodira; subsequently Jensen et al. (2023) question evidence of the presence of a chambered heart in the studied fossil material presented by Trinajstic et al. (2022).

== Cartilaginous fishes ==
=== New cartilaginous fish taxa ===
Name	Novelty	Status	Authors	Age	Type locality	Location	Notes	Images
Carcharhinus dicelmai	Sp. nov	Valid	Collareta et al.	Miocene (Burdigalian)	Chilcatay Formation	Peru	A species of Carcharhinus.	
Cretascymnus beauryi	Sp. nov		Feichtinger et al.	Late Cretaceous (Maastrichtian)	Gerhartsreit Formation	Austria	A member of the family Somniosidae.	
Dalatias orientalis	Sp. nov		Malyshkina et al.	Miocene	Duho Formation	South Korea	A species of Dalatias.	
Dallasiella brachyodon	Sp. nov	Valid	Siversson, Cederström & Ryan	Late Cretaceous (Campanian)	Kristianstad Basin	Sweden	A member of Lamniformes.	
Desinia	Gen. et sp. nov	Valid	Ivanov in Ivanov et al.	Permian		Russia (Kirov Oblast; Komi Republic; Mari El; Tatarstan)	A member of the family Sphenacanthidae. The type species is D. radiata. Published online in 2023, but the issue date is listed as December 2022.	
Dracipinna	Gen. et sp. nov	Valid	Pollerspöck & Straube	Late Oligocene and early Miocene	Ebelsberg Formation	Austria; Germany	A member of the family Dalatiidae. Genus includes new species D. bracheri.	
Eoetmopterus davidi	Sp. nov		Feichtinger et al.	Late Cretaceous (Maastrichtian)	Gerhartsreit Formation	Austria	A member of the family Etmopteridae.	
Fanjingshania	Gen. et sp. nov	Valid	Andreev, Sansom, Li, Zhao & Zhu in Andreev et al.	Silurian (probably Aeronian)	Rongxi Formation	China	A probable relative of climatiid "acanthodians". The type species is F. renovata.	
Fredipristis	Gen et sp. nov		Feichtinger et al.	Late Cretaceous (Maastrichtian)	Gerhartsreit Formation	Austria	A member of Squaliformes of uncertain affinities. The type species is F. eximia.	
Gzhelodus	Gen. et sp. nov	Valid	Ivanov	Carboniferous (Kasimovian–Gzhelian)		Russia (Moscow Oblast; Samara Oblast; Volgograd Oblast)	A member of Euselachii belonging to the family Protacrodontidae. The type species is G. serratus.	
Heslerodoides	Gen. et sp. nov	Valid	Ivanov	Carboniferous (Bashkirian–Gzhelian)	Zilim Formation	Brazil; Russia (Bashkortostan; Moscow Oblast)	A member of Ctenacanthiformes belonging to the family Heslerodidae. The type species is H. triangularis.	
Parvodus huizodus	Sp. nov		Wen et al.	Early Triassic	Dongchuan Formation	China	A member of Hybodontiformes.	
Proetmopterus lukasi	Sp. nov		Feichtinger et al.	Late Cretaceous (Maastrichtian)	Gerhartsreit Formation	Austria	A member of the family Etmopteridae.	
Protoxynotus mayrmelnhofi	Sp. nov		Feichtinger et al.	Late Cretaceous (Maastrichtian)	Gerhartsreit Formation	Austria	A member of the family Somniosidae.	
Qianodus	Gen. et sp. nov	Valid	Andreev, Sansom, Li, Zhao & Zhu in Andreev et al.	Silurian (probably Aeronian)	Rongxi Formation	China	An early jawed vertebrate, likely a stem-chondrichthyan. The type species is Q. duplicis.	
Samarodus	Gen. et sp. nov	Valid	Ivanov	Carboniferous (Moscovian–Gzhelian)		Russia (Bashkortostan; Moscow Oblast; Samara Oblast; Pechora Sea)	A shark of uncertain affinities. The type species is S. flexus.	
Scyliorhinus weemsi	Sp. nov	Valid	Cicimurri, Knight & Ebersole	Oligocene (Rupelian)	Ashley Formation	United States (South Carolina)	A species of Scyliorhinus.	
Shenacanthus	Gen. et sp. nov	Valid	Zhu, Li, Ahlberg & Zhu in Zhu et al.	Silurian (Telychian)	Huixingshao Formation	China	A stem-chondrichthyan. The type species is S. vermiformis.	
Strophodus rebecae	Sp. nov	Valid	Carrillo-Briceño & Cadena	Early Cretaceous (Valanginian-Hauterivian)	Rosablanca Formation	Colombia	A member of Hybodontiformes belonging to the family Acrodontidae.	
Taeniurops tosii	Sp. nov		Adnet & Charpentier	Miocene (Aquitanian)		Oman	A stingray, a species of Taeniurops.	

=== Cartilaginous fish research ===
- A study aiming to quantify the completeness of the acanthodian fossil record is published by Schnetz et al. (2022).
- A study on the biomechanical properties and likely function of bony spines in front of the fins of members of the genus Machaeracanthus is published by Ferrón et al. (2022).
- Duffin, Lauer & Lauer (2022) describe chimaeroid egg cases from the Upper Jurassic (Tithonian) Altmühltal Formation (Germany), probably produced by Ischyodus quenstedti, and name a new ichnotaxon Chimaerotheca schernfeldensis.
- Revision of the fossil material originally attributed to Bibractopiscis niger and Orthacanthus commailli, and a study on the implications of these fossils for the knowledge of the evolution of neurocranium in "ctenacanthiforms" and xenacanthiforms, is published by Luccisano et al. (2022).
- A study on the evolutionary history of members of the genus Orthacanthus from France and on their relationships with the other European species is published by Luccisano et al. (2022).
- Greif, Ferrón & Klug (2022) describe the first known fossil cartilage remains from the Devonian Hangenberg black shale from the Moroccan Anti-Atlas, and interpret its morphology as suggestive of ctenacanth affiliation.
- Taxonomic reassessment of a hybodontiform dental assemblage from the lower Kimmeridgian of Czarnogłowy (Poland), and a study on the implications of this assemblage for the knowledge of ecology and biogeography of cartilaginous fishes prior to the Jurassic/Cretaceous transition, is published by Stumpf, Meng & Kriwet (2022)
- Fossil teeth of sharks belonging to the groups Hexanchiformes, Echinorhiniformes, Squaliformes and Lamniformes, including the first record of Protosqualus in northwestern Pacific reported to date, are described from the Upper Cretaceous Nishichirashinai and Omagari formations (Yezo Group, Japan) by Kanno et al. (2022).
- New fossil material of Xampylodon dentatus, including more complete teeth or specimens representing teeth of different positions than most previous records, and the oldest fossil material of Rolfodon tatere reported to date is described from the Upper Cretaceous (Campanian) of James Ross Island (Antarctica) by dos Santos et al. (2022).
- Feichtinger et al. (2022) describe isolated teeth of Protoxynotus misburgensis from the Santonian of Lebanon, representing the first known record of this species from the southern Tethyan Realm, and interpret this finding as indicating that Protoxynotus and Cretascymnus occupied overlapping or similar habitats during the Late Cretaceous.
- Herraiz et al. (2022) describe teeth of a member of the genus Trigonognathus from the El Ferriol outcrop (Miocene of Spain), representing the first known record of this genus from the Mediterranean realm.
- Revision of the fossil record of the genus Echinorhinus in South America is published by Bogan & Agnolín (2022), who consider Echinorhinus pozzi and Echinorhinus maremagnum to be valid species, and consider E. maremagnum to be distinct from Echinorhinus lapaoi.
- A study on the anatomy, growth and ecology of Cretodus crassidens, based on data from a specimen from the Turonian "Lastame" lithofacies of the Scaglia Rossa Veneta (Lessini Mountains, Veneto, northeastern Italy), is published by Amalfitano et al. (2022).
- A tooth of Cetorhinus huddlestoni, as well as gill rakers differing from previously described cetorhinids and referred to the same species as the tooth, are described from the Miocene Duho Formation (South Korea) by Malyshkina, Nam & Kwon (2022).
- A study aiming to determine whether the observed body forms of lamniform sharks are influenced by thermophysiology, and reevaluating the body form of Otodus megalodon proposed by Cooper et al. (2020), is published by Sternes, Wood & Shimada (2022).
- A study on the putative nursery areas and body size patterns across different populations of Otodus megalodon is published by Shimada et al. (2022), who report that specimens of O. megalodon are on average larger in cooler water than those in warmer water, and argue that the previously identified nursery areas may reflect temperature-dependent trends rather than the inferred reproductive strategy.
- McCormack et al. (2022) demonstrate the use of zinc isotopes to assess the trophic level in extant and extinct sharks, and interpret their findings as indicative of dietary shifts throughout the Neogene in sharks belonging to the genera Otodus and Carcharodon, and indicating that Early Pliocene sympatric great white sharks and Otodus megalodon likely occupied a similar mean trophic level.
- Evidence from nitrogen isotope ratios in fossil teeth of members of the genus Otodus, indicating that O. megalodon occupied a higher trophic level than is known for any marine species, extinct or extant, is presented by Kast et al. (2022).
- Cooper et al. (2022) create the first three-dimensional model of the body of Otodus megalodon and use it to infer its movement and feeding ecology, interpreting it as likely able to swim great distances and to feed on prey as large as modern apex predators.
- A study on tooth marks on physeteroid bones from the Miocene Pisco Formation (Peru) is published by Benites-Palomino et al. (2022), who interpret their findings as indicating that Miocene sharks were actively targeting the foreheads of physeteroids to feed on their lipid-rich nasal complexes, with the shape and distribution of the bite marks suggesting a series of consecutive scavenging events by members of different shark species.
- A study on the evolutionary history of carcharhiniform sharks is published by Brée, Condamine & Guinot (2022), who interpret their findings as indicative of an early low diversity period followed by a radiation exacerbated since 30 million years ago, as well as indicating that variations in diversification through time were likely linked to reef expansion and temperature change.
- Greenfield, Delsate & Candoni (2022) coin a new name Toarcibatidae for the family of Toarcian batomorphs previously referred to as Archaeobatidae.
- A study on the microstructure of rostral denticles of Ischyrhiza mira is published by Cook et al. (2022)
- New record of large dermal tubercles and bucklers, including tubercles similar in morphology to "Ceratoptera unios" and dermal bucklers similar in morphology to those of the extant roughtail stingray, is reported from the Lower Pleistocene Waccamaw Formation (South Carolina, United States) by Boessenecker & Gibson (2022), who interpret this findings as likely fossils of large stingrays in excess of 3 m disc width.
- A study on the phylogenetic relationships of extant and fossil rays and skates is published by Villalobos-Segura et al. (2022).
- A study on the completeness of the chondrichthyan fossil record from Florida, aiming to determine patterns in taxonomic and ecomorphological diversity of Eocene to Pleistocene chondrichthyans from the Florida Platform, is published by Perez (2022).
- Szabó et al. (2022) describe an assemblage of cartilaginous fishes from the Miocene Tekeres Schlieren Member of the Baden Formation (Hungary), including the first known records of deepwater cartilaginous fishes from the Badenian of the Central Paratethys.
- Fossil material of a diverse shark and ray fauna is reported from the early Pleistocene of Taiwan by Lin, Lin & Shimada (2022).

== Ray-finned fishes ==
=== New ray-finned fish taxa ===
Name	Novelty	Status	Authors	Age	Type locality	Location	Notes	Images
Acipenser amnisinferos	Sp. nov	Valid	Hilton & Grande	Late Cretaceous (Maastrichtian)	Hell Creek Formation	United States (North Dakota)	A species of Acipenser.	
Acipenser praeparatorum	Sp. nov	Valid	Hilton & Grande	Late Cretaceous (Maastrichtian)	Hell Creek Formation	United States (North Dakota)	A species of Acipenser.	
Arconiapogon	Gen. et sp. nov	Valid	Marramà, Giusberti & Carnevale	Oligocene (Rupelian)		Italy	A member of the family Apogonidae belonging to the subfamily Apogoninae. The type species is A. deangelii.	
Armigatus felixi	Sp. nov	In press	Than-Marchese & Alvarado-Ortega	Early Cretaceous (Albian)	Tlayúa Formation	Mexico		
Atractosteus grandei	Sp. nov		Brownstein & Lyson	Paleogene (Danian)	Fort Union Formation	United States (North Dakota)	A gar, a species of Atractosteus.	
Bradyurus alessandroi	Sp. nov	Valid	Bannikov & Zorzin	Eocene	Monte Bolca	Italy	A member of Percoidei of uncertain phylogenetic placement.	
Caboellimma	Gen. et comb. nov		De Figueiredo & Gallo	Early Cretaceous	Cabo Formation	Brazil	A member of Clupeomorpha belonging to the group Ellimmichthyiformes; a new genus for "Ellimma" cruzae Santos (1990).	
Calypsoichthys	Gen. et sp. nov	Valid	Argyriou et al.	Late Cretaceous (Maastrichtian)		Greece	A member of the family Enchodontidae. The type species is C. pavlakiensis.	
Capassopiscis	Gen. et sp. nov	Valid	Taverne	Late Cretaceous (Cenomanian)		Lebanon	A member of the family Pantodontidae. The type species is C. pankowskii.	
Chaetodon wattsi	Sp. nov	Valid	Marramà, Giusberti & Carnevale	Oligocene (Rupelian)		Italy	A species of Chaetodon.	
Cheirolepis bychovensis	Sp. nov	Valid	Plax	Devonian (Emsian and Eifelian)	Lepel Beds	Belarus	An early ray-finned fish.	
Concentrilepis	Gen. et sp. nov	Valid	Stack & Gottfried	Permian (Kungurian)	Minnekahta Limestone	United States (South Dakota)	An early ray-finned fish with anatomical features of the paraphyletic "paleoniscoids". The type species is C. minnekahtaensis.	
Coreoperca chosun	Sp. nov	In press	Nam, Nazarkin & Bannikov	Early Miocene	Geumgwangdong Formation	South Korea	A species of Coreoperca.	
Cuneatus maximus	Sp. nov	Valid	Brownstein	Late Paleocene to early Eocene	Willwood Formation	United States (Wyoming)	A gar.	
Dicentrarchus oligocenicus	Sp. nov	In press	Grădianu, Bordeianu & Codrea	Oligocene	Bituminous Marls Formation	Romania	A species of Dicentrarchus.	
Francischanos	Gen. et comb. nov	In press	Ribeiro, Bockmann & Poyato-Ariza	Early Cretaceous (Aptian)	Quiricó Formation	Brazil	A member of the family Chanidae; a new genus for "Dastilbe" moraesi Silva-Santos (1955).	
Germanostomus	Gen. et sp. nov	Valid	Cooper et al.	Early Jurassic (Toarcian)	Posidonia Shale	Germany	A member of the family Pachycormidae belonging to the subfamily Asthenocorminae. The type species is G. pectopteri.	
Harenaichthys	Gen. et sp. nov	In press	Kim et al.	Late Cretaceous (Maastrichtian)	Nemegt Formation	Mongolia	A member of Osteoglossomorpha. The type species is H. lui.	
Ichthyotringa pindica	Sp. nov	Valid	Argyriou et al.	Late Cretaceous (Maastrichtian)		Greece		
Italopterus	Gen. et comb. nov	Valid	Shen & Arratia	Triassic		Italy	A member of the family Thoracopteridae. Genus includes "Thoracopterus" magnificus Tintori & Sassi (1987) and "Thoracopterus" martinisi Tintori & Sassi (1992).	
Jenynsia herbsti	Sp. nov	Valid	Sferco et al.	Late Miocene		Argentina	A species of Jenynsia.	
Kaykay	Gen. et sp. nov	Valid	Gouiric-Cavalli & Arratia	Jurassic (Oxfordian stage)		Argentina	A member of Pachycormiformes. Genus includes new species K. lafken.	
Kutaichthys	Gen et 2 sp. nov	Valid	Bakaev in Esin & Bakaev	Permian		Russia (Komi Republic; Perm Krai; Samara Oblast)	An early ray-finned fish belonging to the group Palaeonisciformes and the family Palaeoniscidae. The type species is K. gubini Esin & Bakaev; genus also includes K. dozmerensis Esin & Bakaev. Published online in 2023, but the issue date is listed as December 2022.	
Libyachromis	Gen. et sp. nov	Valid	Přikryl, Kaur & Murray	Oligocene		Libya	A cichlid belonging to the subfamily Pseudocrenilabrinae. The type species is L. fugacior.	
Lophionotus parnaibensis	Sp. nov	In press	Gallo et al.	Late Jurassic	Pastos Bons Formation	Brazil	A member of the family Semionotidae.	
Makaira colonense	Sp. nov	Valid	De Gracia et al.	Late Miocene	Chagres Formation	Panama	A species of Makaira.	
Makaira fierstini	Sp. nov	Valid	De Gracia et al.	Late Miocene	Gatún Formation	Panama	A species of Makaira.	
Marcopoloichthys furreri	Sp. nov	Valid	Arratia	Middle Triassic (Ladinian)	Upper Prosanto Formation	Switzerland	A member of Teleosteomorpha belonging to the family Marcopoloichthyidae.	
Minicholepis	Gen et sp. nov	Valid	Bulanov, Minikh & Golubev	Permian		Russia (Kirov Oblast)	A member of Eurynotoidiformes. The type species is M. primus. Published online in 2023, but the issue date is listed as December 2022.	
Moldavigobius	Gen. et sp. et comb. nov	Valid	Reichenbacher & Bannikov	Miocene		Moldova; Turkey	A member of the family Gobiidae. The type species is M. helenae; genus also includes "Knipowitschia" suavis Schwarzhans (2014).	
Morgula	Gen. et sp. nov	Valid	De Gracia et al.	Late Miocene	Chagres Formation	Panama	A marlin. The type species is M. donosochagrense.	
Notogoneus maarvelis	Sp. nov	Valid	Grande & Wilson in Grande et al.	Late Cretaceous (Campanian)		Canada (Northwest Territories)	A member of the family Gonorynchidae.	
Nusaviichthys	Gen. et sp. nov	In press	Alvarado-Ortega & Alves	Early Cretaceous (Albian)		Mexico	A member of Crossognathiformes belonging to the family Notelopidae. The type species is N. nerivelai.	
Oechsleria	Gen. et sp. nov	In press	Micklich & Bannikov	Oligocene (Rupelian)	Bodenheim Formation	Germany	A member of the family Veliferidae. The type species is O. unterfeldensis.	
Oligopseudamia	Gen. et sp. nov	Valid	Marramà, Giusberti & Carnevale	Oligocene (Rupelian)		Italy	A member of the family Apogonidae belonging to the subfamily Pseudaminae. The type species is O. iancurtisi.	
Oniketia	Gen. et sp. nov	Valid	Marramà, Giusberti & Carnevale	Oligocene (Rupelian)		Italy	A member of the family Gobiidae. The type species is O. akihitoi.	
Palaeoneiros	Gen. et sp. nov	Valid	Giles et al.	Devonian (Famennian)	Chadakoin Formation	United States (Pennsylvania)	An early ray-finned fish with affinities to post-Devonian species Wendyichthys dicksoni and Cyranorhis bergeraci. Genus includes new species P. clackorum.	
Paleoschizothorax diluculum	Sp. nov	Valid	Yang et al.	Oligocene	Shangganchaigou Formation	China	A member of the family Cyprinidae related to Schizothorax.	
Pavarottia astescalpone	Sp. nov	Valid	Bannikov & Zorzin	Eocene	Monte Bolca	Italy	A member of Percoidei belonging to the family Pavarottiidae.	
Piratata	Gen. et sp. nov	In press	Richter et al.	Permian (Cisuralian)	Pedra de Fogo Formation	Brazil	A deep-scaled ray-finned fish. Genus includes new species P. rogersmithii.	
Pleuropholis germinalis	Sp. nov	Valid	Olive, Taverne & Brito	Early Cretaceous (Barremian to Aptian)	Sainte-Barbe Clays Formation	Belgium		
Polyspinatus	Gen. et sp. nov		Schrøder et al.	Eocene	Fur Formation	Denmark	A beardfish. Genus includes new species P. fluere.	
Prototetrapturus	Gen. et comb. nov	Valid	De Gracia et al.	Miocene (Messinian)		Algeria	A marlin. The type species is "Xiphiorhynchus" courcelli Arambourg (1927).	
Saurichthys sui	Sp. nov	In press	Fang & Wu	Late Triassic	Junggar Basin	China		
Saurichthys taotie	Sp. nov	Valid	Fang et al.	Late Triassic (Carnian)	Xiaowa Formation	China	Announced in 2022; the final article version was published in 2023.	
Scomber collettei	Sp. nov	Valid	Bannikov & Erebakan	Miocene		Russia (Krasnodar Krai)	A species of Scomber.	
Seinstedtia	Gen. et sp. nov	Valid	Schultze et al.	Late Triassic (Norian)		Germany	A member of Teleosteomorpha of uncertain affinities. The type species is S. parva.	
Somalichromis	Gen. et sp. nov		Murray	Oligocene	Daban Series	Somaliland	A cichlid belonging to the subfamily Pseudocrenilabrinae. The type species is S. hadrocephalus.	
Spathochoira	Gen. et comb. nov	Valid	De Gracia et al.	Late Miocene	Eastover Formation	United States (Virginia)	A marlin. The type species is "Istiophorus" calvertensis Berry (1917).	
Spinascutichthys	Gen. et sp. nov	Valid	Murray, Chida & Holmes	Late Cretaceous (Cenomanian)		Lebanon	A member of Aulopiformes belonging to the group Enchodontoidei. Genus includes new species S. pankowskiae.	
Stenobrachius sangsunii	Sp. nov		Nam & Nazarkin	Miocene	Duho Formation	South Korea	A species of Stenobrachius.	
Sturisomatichthys podgornyi	Sp. nov	Valid	Bogan & Agnolin	Late Miocene		Argentina	A species of Sturisomatichthys.	
Teffichthys elegans	Sp. nov	Valid	Yuan et al.	Early Triassic (Induan)	Daye Formation	China	A member of the family Perleididae.	
Vologdinia	Gen et comb. nov	Valid	Bulanov, Minikh & Golubev	Permian	Poldarsa/Poldarskaya Formation	Russia (Orenburg Oblast; Vologda Oblast)	A member of Eurynotoidiformes. The type species is "Isadia" opokiensis Minikh & Andrushkevich (2017). Published online in 2023, but the issue date is listed as December 2022.	
Xinjiangodus	Gen. et sp. nov	Junior homonym	Zhou et al.	Late Cretaceous	Donggou Formation	China	A member of the family Pycnodontidae. Genus includes new species X. gyrodoides. The generic name is preoccupied by Xinjiangodus Yue & Gao (1992).	

==== Otolith taxa ====
Name	Novelty	Status	Authors	Age	Type locality	Location	Notes	Images
Acentrogobius matsya	Sp. nov	In press	Carolin et al.	Miocene (Burdigalian)	Quilon Formation	India	A species of Acentrogobius.	
Allocyclostoma	Gen. et sp. nov	In press	Schwarzhans, Stringer & Welton	Early Cretaceous (Albian)	Pawpaw Formation	United States (Texas)	Possibly a member of Polymixiiformes. The type species is A. alienus.	
Amblyeleotris kireedam	Sp. nov	In press	Carolin et al.	Miocene (Burdigalian)	Quilon Formation	India	A species of Amblyeleotris.	
Ancistrogobius indicus	Sp. nov	In press	Carolin et al.	Miocene (Burdigalian)	Quilon Formation	India	A species of Ancistrogobius.	
Anisotremus rambo	Sp. nov	Valid	Lin & Nolf	Eocene		United States (Alabama; Louisiana; Texas)	A species of Anisotremus.	
Archaeotolithus doppelsteini	Sp. nov	Valid	Schwarzhans & Keupp	Early Jurassic (Pliensbachian)	Amaltheenton Formation	Germany	A member of Actinopterygii of uncertain affinities.	
Argentina? texana	Sp. nov	In press	Schwarzhans, Stringer & Welton	Early Cretaceous (Albian)	Pawpaw Formation	United States (Texas)	Possibly a species of Argentina.	
Astroscopus compactus	Sp. nov	Valid	Lin & Nolf	Eocene	Gosport Sand	United States (Alabama; Mississippi)	A species of Astroscopus.	
Bellottia verecunda	Sp. nov	Valid	Carnevale & Schwarzhans	Miocene (Messinian) and Pliocene		Italy Spain	A species of Bellottia.	
Benthosema taurinense	Sp. nov	Valid	Carnevale & Schwarzhans	Miocene (Tortonian and Messinian)		Italy	A species of Benthosema.	
Bidenichthys mediterraneus	Sp. nov	Valid	Van Hinsbergh & Hoedemakers	Pliocene		Spain	A species of Bidenichthys.	
Blennius vernyhorovae	Sp. nov		Schwarzhans, Klots & Kovalchuk in Schwarzhans et al.	Miocene		Ukraine	Originally described as a species of Blennius, but subsequently transferred to the genus Thalassoma.	
Bolinichthys higashibesshoensis	Sp. nov	Valid	Schwarzhans et al.	Miocene	Higashibessho Formation	Japan	A species of Bolinichthys.	
Bostrychus marsilii	Sp. nov	Valid	Carnevale & Schwarzhans	Miocene (Messinian)		Italy	A species of Bostrychus.	
Buenia pulvinus	Sp. nov	Valid	Van Hinsbergh & Hoedemakers	Pliocene		Morocco Spain	A species of Buenia.	
Callionymus vyali	Sp. nov	In press	Carolin et al.	Miocene (Burdigalian)	Quilon Formation	India	A species of Callionymus.	
Cantarius ohei	Sp. nov		Schwarzhans et al.	Miocene	Pebas Formation	Peru	A member of the family Ariidae.	
Centroberyx vaalsensis	Sp. nov	In press	Schwarzhans & Jagt	Late Cretaceous (Campanian)	Vaals Formation	Netherlands	A species of Centroberyx.	
Ceratoscopelus brevis	Sp. nov	Valid	Schwarzhans et al.	Miocene	Takakura Formation	Japan	A species of Ceratoscopelus.	
Cichlasoma bluntschlii	Sp. nov		Schwarzhans et al.	Miocene	Pebas Formation	Peru	A species of Cichlasoma.	
Cirripectes biconvexus	Sp. nov	In press	Carolin et al.	Miocene (Burdigalian)	Quilon Formation	India	A species of Cirripectes.	
"Citharus" varians	Sp. nov	Valid	Lin & Nolf	Eocene	Cook Mountain Formation	United States (Alabama; Texas)	A member of the family Citharidae.	
Coris medoboryensis	Sp. nov		Schwarzhans, Klots & Kovalchuk in Schwarzhans et al.	Miocene		Ukraine	A species of Coris.	
Diaphus epipedus	Sp. nov	Valid	Schwarzhans et al.	Miocene	Takakura Formation	Japan	A species of Diaphus.	
Diaphus mermuysi	Sp. nov	Valid	Van Hinsbergh & Hoedemakers	Pliocene		Spain	A species of Diaphus.	
Diaphus postcavallonis	Sp. nov	Valid	Van Hinsbergh & Hoedemakers	Pliocene		Spain	A species of Diaphus.	
Diaphus watatsumi	Sp. nov	Valid	Schwarzhans et al.	Miocene	Takakura Formation	Japan	A species of Diaphus.	
Drombus thackerae	Sp. nov	In press	Carolin et al.	Miocene (Burdigalian)	Quilon Formation	India	A species of Drombus.	
Elopothrissus bernardlemorti	Sp. nov	Valid	Lin & Nolf	Eocene		United States (Alabama; Texas)	A member of Albuliformes.	
Elopothrissus pawpawensis	Sp. nov	In press	Schwarzhans, Stringer & Welton	Early Cretaceous (Albian)	Pawpaw Formation	United States (Texas)		
Eosciaena	Gen. et sp. nov	Valid	Stringer, Parmley & Quinn	Eocene (Bartonian)	Clinchfield Formation	United States (Georgia (U.S. state); Louisiana)	A member of the family Sciaenidae. The type species is E. ebersolei.	
Fibramia keralensis	Sp. nov	In press	Carolin et al.	Miocene (Burdigalian)	Quilon Formation	India	A species of Fibramia.	
Fowleria velerinensis	Sp. nov	Valid	Van Hinsbergh & Hoedemakers	Pliocene		Spain	A species of Fowleria.	
Fusigobius? venadicus	Sp. nov	In press	Carolin et al.	Miocene (Burdigalian)	Quilon Formation	India	Possibly a species of Fusigobius.	
Genartina princeps	Sp. nov	In press	Schwarzhans, Stringer & Welton	Early Cretaceous (Albian)	Pawpaw Formation	United States (Texas)	A teleost of uncertain affinities, possibly near Albuliformes.	
Gerres mlynskyi	Sp. nov	Valid	Brzobohatý, Zahradníková & Hudáčková	Miocene	Vienna Basin	Austria France; Poland; Slovakia	A species of Gerres.	
"aff. Glyptophidium" stringeri	Sp. nov	Valid	Lin & Nolf	Eocene		United States (Alabama; Mississippi; Texas)	A cusk-eel. Subsequently transferred to the genus Baobythites by Schwarzhans, Stringer & Takeuchi (2024).	
Gnathophis henkmulderi	Sp. nov	Valid	Van Hinsbergh & Hoedemakers	Pliocene		Spain	A species of Gnathophis.	
Gobiodon burdigalicus	Sp. nov	In press	Carolin et al.	Miocene (Burdigalian)	Quilon Formation	India	A species of Gobiodon.	
Gobius alboranensis	Sp. nov	Valid	Van Hinsbergh & Hoedemakers	Pliocene		Spain	A species of Gobius.	
Gobius bratishkoi	Sp. nov		Schwarzhans, Klots & Kovalchuk in Schwarzhans et al.	Miocene		Ukraine	A species of Gobius.	
Gobius lombartei	Sp. nov	Valid	Van Hinsbergh & Hoedemakers	Pliocene		Spain	A species of Gobius.	
"Gobius" pterois	Sp. nov	Valid	Van Hinsbergh & Hoedemakers	Pliocene		Spain	A possible species of Gobius.	
Gobius ukrainicus	Sp. nov		Schwarzhans, Klots & Kovalchuk in Schwarzhans et al.	Miocene		Ukraine	A species of Gobius.	
Ichthyotringa? cuneata	Sp. nov	In press	Schwarzhans, Stringer & Welton	Early Cretaceous (Albian)	Pawpaw Formation	United States (Texas)	A member of Aulopiformes belonging to the family Ichthyotringidae.	
Jaydia? quilonica	Sp. nov	In press	Carolin et al.	Miocene (Burdigalian)	Quilon Formation	India	Possibly a species of Jaydia.	
Kryptophanaron nolfi	Sp. nov	Valid	Van Hinsbergh & Hoedemakers	Pliocene		Spain	A species of Kryptophanaron.	
Lampadena exima	Sp. nov	Valid	Schwarzhans et al.	Miocene	Takakura Formation	Japan	A species of Lampadena.	
Lampanyctus beczynensis	Sp. nov	Valid	Schwarzhans & Radwańska	Miocene (Langhian)		Poland	A species of Lampanyctus.	
Lampanyctus lenticularis	Sp. nov	Valid	Schwarzhans et al.	Miocene	Takakura Formation	Japan	A species of Lampanyctus.	
Lampanyctus tsuyamaensis	Sp. nov	Valid	Schwarzhans et al.	Miocene	Takakura Formation	Japan	A species of Lampanyctus.	
Leptolepis buttenheimensis	Sp. nov	Valid	Schwarzhans & Keupp	Early Jurassic (Pliensbachian)	Amaltheenton Formation	Germany	Extinct species of ray finned fish.	
Leptolepis steberae	Sp. nov	Valid	Schwarzhans & Keupp	Early Jurassic (Pliensbachian)	Amaltheenton Formation	Germany		
Medoborichthys	Gen. et 2 sp. nov		Schwarzhans, Klots & Kovalchuk in Schwarzhans et al.	Miocene		Ukraine	A member of the family Gobiidae belonging to the Priolepis lineage within the subfamily Gobiinae. The type species is M. renesulcis; genus also includes M. podolicus.	
Mene garviei	Sp. nov	Valid	Lin & Nolf	Eocene	Cook Mountain Formation	United States (Texas)	A species of Mene.	
"Muraenesox" barrytownensis	Sp. nov	Valid	Lin & Nolf	Eocene	Lisbon Formation	United States (Alabama; Texas)	A member of the family Muraenesocidae.	
Neoopisthopterus weltoni	Sp. nov	Valid	Lin & Nolf	Eocene	Cook Mountain Formation	United States (Texas)	A species of Neoopisthopterus.	
Nezumia prikryli	Sp. nov	Valid	Schwarzhans	Miocene (Langhian)		Czech Republic	A species of Nezumia.	
Oligophus bartonensis	Sp. nov	Valid	Schwarzhans & Carnevale	Eocene (Bartonian)	Marne di Monte Piano Formation	Italy	A lanternfish.	
Pagellus pamunkeyensis	Sp. nov	Valid	Lin & Nolf	Eocene	Piney Point Formation	United States (Virginia)	A species of Pagellus.	
Paraconger pinguis	Sp. nov	Valid	Van Hinsbergh & Hoedemakers	Pliocene		Spain	A species of Paraconger.	
Paraconger wechesensis	Sp. nov	Valid	Lin & Nolf	Eocene	Weches Formation	United States (Texas)	A member of the family Congridae. Originally described as a species of Paraconger; subsequently transferred to the genus Protanago by Schwarzhans, Stringer & Takeuchi (2024).	
Parascombrops yanceyi	Sp. nov	Valid	Lin & Nolf	Eocene		United States (Texas)	A species of Parascombrops.	
Paraulopus wichitae	Sp. nov	In press	Schwarzhans, Stringer & Welton	Early Cretaceous (Albian)	Pawpaw Formation	United States (Texas)	A species of Paraulopus.	
Parenypnias	Gen. et 2 sp. nov		Schwarzhans, Klots & Kovalchuk in Schwarzhans et al.	Miocene		Czech Republic Ukraine	A member of the family Gobiidae belonging to the subfamily Gobiinae and the tribe Gobiosomatini. The type species is P. inauditus; genus also includes P. kiselevi.	
Pebasciaena	Gen. et sp. nov		Schwarzhans et al.	Miocene	Pebas Formation	Peru	A member of the family Sciaenidae. The type species is P. amazonensis.	
Plagioscion peyeri	Sp. nov		Schwarzhans et al.	Miocene	Pebas Formation	Peru	A species of Plagioscion.	
Pogonias tetragonus	Sp. nov		Schwarzhans et al.	Miocene	Pebas Formation	Peru	A species of Pogonias.	
Prionotus arenarius	Sp. nov	Valid	Van Hinsbergh & Hoedemakers	Pliocene		Spain	A species of Prionotus.	
Pristigenys adrianae	Sp. nov	Valid	Van Hinsbergh & Hoedemakers	Pliocene		Spain	A species of Pristigenys.	
Protoholocentrus	Gen. et sp. nov	In press	Schwarzhans & Jagt	Late Cretaceous (Campanian)	Vaals Formation	Netherlands	A member of Holocentriformes of uncertain affinities. The type species is P. janjanssensi.	
Pseudophichthys texanus	Sp. nov	Valid	Lin & Nolf	Eocene	Weches Formation	United States (Alabama; Mississippi; Texas; Virginia)	A species of Pseudophichthys.	
Pythonichthys gibbosus	Sp. nov	Valid	Van Hinsbergh & Hoedemakers	Pliocene		Spain	A species of Pythonichthys.	
Saurenchelys silex	Sp. nov	Valid	Van Hinsbergh & Hoedemakers	Pliocene		Morocco Spain	A species of Saurenchelys.	
Sillaginocentrus crispus	Sp. nov	In press	Schwarzhans & Jagt	Late Cretaceous (Campanian)	Vaals Formation	Netherlands	A member of Holocentriformes of uncertain affinities.	
Siphamia minor	Sp. nov	In press	Carolin et al.	Miocene (Burdigalian)	Quilon Formation	India	A species of Siphamia.	
Smithconger	Gen. et comb. nov	Valid	Carnevale et al.	Eocene	Lillebælt Clay Formation	Denmark New Zealand	A member of the family Congridae. The type species is "Pseudoxenomystax" treldeensis Schwarzhans (2007); genus also includes "Bathycongrus" waihaoensis Schwarzhans (2019).	
Snyderina stillaformis	Sp. nov	Valid	Van Hinsbergh & Hoedemakers	Pliocene		Spain	A species of Snyderina.	
Stenobrachius ohashii	Sp. nov	Valid	Schwarzhans et al.	Miocene	Kurosedani Formation	Japan	A species of Stenobrachius.	
Symmetrosulcus dockeryi	Sp. nov	Valid	Lin & Nolf	Eocene	Weches Formation	United States (Alabama; Mississippi; Texas)	A cusk-eel.	
Texoma	Gen. et sp. nov	In press	Schwarzhans, Stringer & Welton	Early Cretaceous (Albian)	Pawpaw Formation	United States (Texas)	Possibly a member of Polymixiiformes. The type species is T. cyclogaster.	
Thorogobius antirostratus	Sp. nov	Valid	Brzobohatý, Zahradníková & Hudáčková	Miocene	Vienna Basin	Slovakia	A species of Thorogobius.	
Thorogobius mirbachae	Sp. nov	Valid	Van Hinsbergh & Hoedemakers	Pliocene		Spain	A species of Thorogobius.	
Trachinus meridianus	Sp. nov	Valid	Schwarzhans & Kovalchuk	Miocene		Poland Ukraine	A species of Trachinus.	
Umbrina pachaula	Sp. nov		Schwarzhans et al.	Miocene	Pebas Formation	Peru	A species of Umbrina.	
Waitakia beelzebub	Sp. nov	Valid	Lin & Nolf	Eocene	Piney Point Formation	United States (Alabama; Virginia)	A member of the subfamily Hemerocoetinae.	

=== Ray-finned fish research ===
- A new database of the occurrences of Paleozoic ray-finned fishes is presented by Henderson et al. (2022), who evaluate the impact of fossil record biases, as well as taxonomic and phylogenetic issues, on the knowledge of the early evolution of ray-finned fishes; subsequently Henderson, Dunne & Giles (2022) use this database to study patterns of diversity of ray-finned fishes through the Paleozoic, taking the extent and impact of sampling biases into account.
- A novel mode of fang accommodation, with teeth of the lower jaw inserting into fenestrae of the upper jaw, is reported in Brazilichthys macrognathus by Figueroa & Andrews (2022).
- Redescription and a study on the affinities of Toyemia is published by Bakaev & Kogan (2022).
- Redescription of the anatomy and a study on the affinities of Brachydegma caelatum is published by Argyriou, Giles & Friedman (2022).
- Osteoderms providing evidence of presence of large sturgeons (within the upper size bracket for Acipenseridae) in early-middle Paleocene freshwater ecosystems of western North America are described from the Fort Union Formation (Montana, United States) by Brownstein (2022).
- Fossil material of a member or a relative of the genus Eomesodon, representing the oldest record of pycnodonts from East Gondwana reported to date, is described from the Middle Jurassic (Bathonian) Jaisalmer Formation (Rajasthan, India) by Kumar et al. (2022).
- A study on the tooth replacement pattern and implantation in Serrasalmimus secans is published by Matsui & Kimura (2022), who interpret their findings as indicating that serrasalmimid pycnodont fish independently acquired a vertical replacement in true thecodont implantation, i.e. a characteristic tooth replacement pattern of mammals.
- A study on the phylogenetic relationships and evolutionary history of extant and extinct gars is published by Brownstein et al. (2022).
- Redescription and a study on the affinities of Saurostomus esocinus is published by Cooper & Maxwell (2022), who interpret this taxon as the basalmost transitional member of the suspension-feeding clade of pachycormids.
- A study on bone repair in response to damage in Leedsichthys problematicus is published by Johanson et al. (2022).
- Redescription and a study on the affinities of Thaumaturus intermedius is published by Micklich & Arratia (2022).
- Redescription of "Diplomystus" solignaci is published by Marramà, Khalloufi & Carnevale (2022), who interpret this fish as a paraclupeid ellimmichthyiform, and transfer it to the genus Paraclupea.
- A study on cranial morphological features that diagnose known families of catfishes, and on their implications for the knowledge of the affinities of catfishes from the Paleogene of Africa, is published by Murray & Holmes (2022), who reassess the familial placement of the Paleogene African catfishes and assign Eomacrones wilsoni to the family Bagridae sensu stricto.
- Description of new fossil material of Enchodus from the Cenomanian of Ukraine, and a revision of earlier records of Enchodus from Ukraine, is published by Kovalchuk, Barkaszi & Anfimova (2022).
- Redescription and a study on the phylogenetic affinities of Protosyngnathus sumatrensis is published by Murray (2022).
- A study on the phylogenetic affinities of fossil gobioids is published by Gierl et al. (2022).
- New specimen of Mene rhombea with extensive soft tissue preservation and striking colour patterning is described from the Eocene (Ypresian) Monte Bolca Lagerstätte (Italy) by Rossi et al. (2022).
- A study on patterns of body size evolution of tetraodontiforms in relation to paleoclimate events is published by Troyer et al. (2022).
- Přikryl et al. (2022) describe a new specimen of Archaeotetraodon winterbottomi from the Oligocene Rybnytsia Member of the Menilite Series (Ukraine), providing new information on the anatomy of this tetraodontid.

== Lobe-finned fishes ==
=== New lobe-finned fish taxa ===
Name	Novelty	Status	Authors	Age	Type locality	Location	Notes	Images
Ceratodus guanganensis	Sp. nov	Valid	Wang et al.	Late Jurassic	Shaximiao Formation	China	Announced in 2021; the final version of the article naming it was published in 2022.	
Ceratodus shishkini	Sp. nov	Valid	Minikh	Triassic		Russia (Orenburg Oblast)	Published online in 2023, but the issue date is listed as December 2022.	
Dianodipterus	Gen. et sp. nov	Valid	Luo et al.	Devonian (Eifelian)	Qujing Formation	China	A lungfish. The type species is D. huizeensis.	
Diplurus enigmaticus	Sp. nov		Brownstein & Bissell	Triassic		United States (New Jersey)	A coelacanth.	
Langlieria smalingi	Sp. nov	Valid	Downs & Daeschler	Devonian (Frasnian)	Catskill Formation	United States (Pennsylvania)	A member of the family Tristichopteridae.	
Libys callolepis	Sp. nov	Valid	Ferrante, Menkveld-Gfeller & Cavin	Early Jurassic (Toarcian)	Stadelgraben Formation	Switzerland	A coelacanth belonging to the family Latimeriidae.	
Qikiqtania	Gen. et sp. nov	Valid	Stewart et al.	Devonian (Frasnian)	Fram Formation	Canada (Nunavut)	An elpistostegalian. The type species is Q. wakei.	
Rhizodus serpukhovensis	Sp. nov	Valid	Smirnova	Carboniferous (Serpukhovian)		Russia (Moscow Oblast)		
Rinconodus	Gen. et sp. nov	Valid	Panzeri et al.	Late Cretaceous (Santonian)	Bajo de la Carpa Formation	Argentina	A lungfish belonging to the family Ceratodontidae. The type species is R. salvadori.	

=== Lobe-finned fish research ===
- Review of the phylogenetic analyses of onychodont relationships, aiming to determine the sources of discrepancies in the different phylogenetic hypotheses, is published by Ciudad Real et al. (2022).
- A study on the histology of the median fin bones and life history of Miguashaia bureaui is published by Mondéjar Fernandez et al. (2022).
- Toriño et al. (2022) describe a large mawsoniid coelacanth from the Upper Jurassic Kimmeridge Clay (United Kingdom), interpret its morphology as unexpectedly similar to the morphology of Mawsonia, and consider the studied coelacanth to be either an unknown Mawsonia-like form or a member of the lineage of Trachymetopon with some morphological characters previously assumed as diagnostic for Mawsonia.
- Description of cranial endocasts of six Paleozoic lungfish (Iowadipterus halli, Gogodipterus paddyensis, Pillararhynchus longi, Griphognathus whitei, Orlovichthys limnatis, Rhinodipterus ulrichi), and a study on the evolution of crania, brains and sensory abilities of lungfish, is published by Clement et al. (2022).
- Description of two well-preserved specimens of Youngolepis praecursor from the Devonian Xitun Formation (China), and a study on the implications of these specimens for the knowledge of the evolution of the specialized lungfish feeding mechanism, is published by Cui et al. (2022).
- A study on the anatomy of the neurocrania of Scaumenacia curta and Pentlandia macroptera is published by Boirot, Challands & Cloutier (2022), who report that the neurocranium of P. macroptera was at least partially ossified, while S. curta had a cartilaginous neurocranium, and evaluate the implications of their findings for the knowledge of paedomorphosis in lungfish evolution.
- A study on the histology of the tooth plates of Metaceratodus baibianorum from the Upper Cretaceous La Colonia Formation (Argentina) is published by Panzeri, Pereyra & Cione (2022).
- A study on the anatomy and affinities of Palaeospondylus gunni is published by Hirasawa et al. (2022), who interpret this taxon as a sarcopterygian, and likely a stem-tetrapod; their conclusions are subsequently contested by Brownstein (2023).

== Other ==
Name	Novelty	Status	Authors	Age	Type locality	Location	Notes	Images
Permodontodus	Gen. et sp. nov	Valid	McMenamin	Permian (Kungurian)	Wellington Formation	United States (Oklahoma)	A bony fish of uncertain affinities, possibly a lobe-finned fish. Genus includes new species P. waurikensis.	

== General research ==
- A study on the evolution of swimming speed in early vertebrates, inferred from caudal fin morphology of Paleozoic cyclostomes (Myxinidae and Petromyzontidae), jawless stem gnathostomes (Conodonta, Anaspida, Pteraspidomorphi, Thelodonti and Osteostraci) and placoderms, is published by Ferrón & Donoghue (2022), who interpret their findings as indicating that microsquamous taxa (thelodonts and anaspids) had higher swimming capabilities than vertebrates with rigid bony carapaces (including placoderms), that demonstrating that the rise of active nektonic vertebrates long-predated the Devonian.
- A study on the morphological similarities of Silurian and Devonian jawless and jawed vertebrates, aiming to determine which groups were most and least likely to have competed (and whether competition with jawed vertebrates was likely to cause the extinction of the majority of jawless vertebrates), is published by Scott & Anderson (2022), who don't find support for overall competitive exclusion of jawless vertebrates by jawed vertebrates.
- A study on the evolution of the vertebrate spiracular region from jawless vertebrates to tetrapods is published by Gai et al. (2022).
- A study on the mandibular morphology of Silurian and Devonian jawed vertebrates, and on the functional capabilities of their jaws, is published by Deakin et al. (2022).
- Description of the ichthyolith assemblage from the Upper Triassic Luning Formation (Nevada, United States), increasing known diversity of marine vertebrates in the western United States in the Late Triassic from four to at least 14 genera, is published by Tackett, Zierer & Clement (2022), who report evidence of the presence of taxa that were previously known only from Europe during the Late Triassic.
- Revision of the marine fish fauna from the Upper Cretaceous (Campanian) Rybushka Formation (Saratov Oblast, Russia) is published by Ebersole et al. (2022).
- A study aiming to reconstruct the fish community and oceanographic conditions off the coast of Peru during the last interglacial, based on data from sediments from the northern Humboldt Current system, is published by Salvatteci et al. (2022).
- Review of the fossil material providing information on the reproduction of extinct fishes is published by Capasso (2022), who names new ootaxa Theutonicootheca primigenia (possible egg capsule of jawless vertebrates or placoderms from the Emsian Kaub Formation, Germany), Beargulchootheca carbonifera (possible egg capsule of cartilaginous fishes from the Mississippian Bear Gulch Limestone of the Heath Formation, Montana, United States), Palaeochimaerootheca browni (egg capsule of chimaerids from the Pennsylvanian Cherokee Shale, Missouri, and Mazon Creek fossil beds, Illinois, United States), and Parascylliootheca libanica (egg capsule of parascylliids from the Cretaceous Sannine Formation, Lebanon).
