= Caeruleum (lamprey) =

Caeruleum Temporal range: Early Cretaceous, 122.1 Ma

Scientific classification
- Kingdom: Animalia
- Phylum: Chordata
- Infraphylum: Agnatha
- Superclass: Cyclostomi
- Class: Petromyzontida
- Order: Petromyzontiformes
- Genus: †Caeruleum; Huang, 2023

Type species
- †Caeruleum miraculum Huang, 2023

Other species
- †C. gracilis Huang et al., 2024

Extinct genus of lampreys

Caeruleum is an extinct genus of lamprey from the Lower Cretaceous Jiufotang Formation of China. The genus contains two species, C. miraculum and C. gracilis, known from various specimens including complete and partial bodies.

== Discovery and naming ==
Approximate location of the Caeruleum species type localities near Weichang County, China

The first described Caeruleum fossil material was discovered in sediments of the Jiufotang Formation near Naizi (or Naitou) Mountain in Weichang County of Chengde City, Hebei Province, China. Various lamprey specimens were found in this formation.

In 2023, Weijia Huang described Caeruleum miraculum as a new genus and species of lamprey based on several fossil remains. The holotype specimen, BMM 3770, consists of a complete animal preserved on a slab and counterslab. Several additional specimens of various levels of completion were also assigned to Caeruleum as paratypes. These include BMM 3771 (an incomplete specimen with a complete tail), BMM 3772 (the posterior end of an animal with a mutilated tail), BMM 3776 (the anterior end with a complete head), and BMM 3775, 3777, and 778 (nearly complete specimens missing the posterior ends).

The generic name, "Caeruleum", implements the blue color caeruleum. The specific name, "miraculum", is derived from the Latin "mirabilis", meaning "wonderful", in reference to the nature of the fossil specimens. The full binomial name references the Blue Miracle Museum Science Research Studio in Guangzhou (Guangdong Province), China, where the specimens are housed.

In 2024, Huang and colleagues named a second species of the genus Caeruleum, Caeruleum gracilis, also from Naizi Mountain outcrops. C. gracilis is only known the holotype specimen, BMM 3990, a partial individual missing the end of the tail. The specific name, "gracilis", is derived from a Latin word meaning "slender", in reference to the body shape of the species in comparison to C. miraculum.

Caeruleum is the seventh named genus of fossil lamprey, after Mayomyzon, Pipiscius, Hardistiella, Mesomyzon, Priscomyzon, and Hebeimyzon. After Mesomyzon and Hebeimyzon, Caeruleum is also the third Cretaceous fossil lamprey genus. A short time after the initial description of Caeruleum, Xu, Janvier & Zhang (2023) named the new genus Yanliaomyzon, containing the two species Y. occisor and Y. ingensdentes, from the Middle–Late Jurassic Tiaojishan Formation of China.

== Description ==
Size of several Caeruleum specimens compared to a human hand

The Caeruleum specimens exhibit significant variation in size; C. miraculum specimens range from 24–46.2 centimetres (9.4–18.2 in) in length. This is significantly larger than most other fossil lampreys and is comparable to some extant species. Contrastingly, the C. gracilis holotype is even smaller, with a preserved length of 6 centimetres (2.4 in) and an estimated total length of 9.6 centimetres (3.8 in) or longer. Like modern lampreys, Caeruleum had seven gill pouches. In C. miraculum, the anterior dorsal fin originates after the last gill pouch, while in C. gracilis, the dorsal fin is smaller, beginning after the second gill pouch and extending only 7 millimetres (0.28 in) past the last. In comparison, the Cretaceous Mesomyzon from the Yixian Formation ranged from 15–21.7 centimetres (5.9–8.5 in) long, with the dorsal fin beginning after the fourth gill pouch.

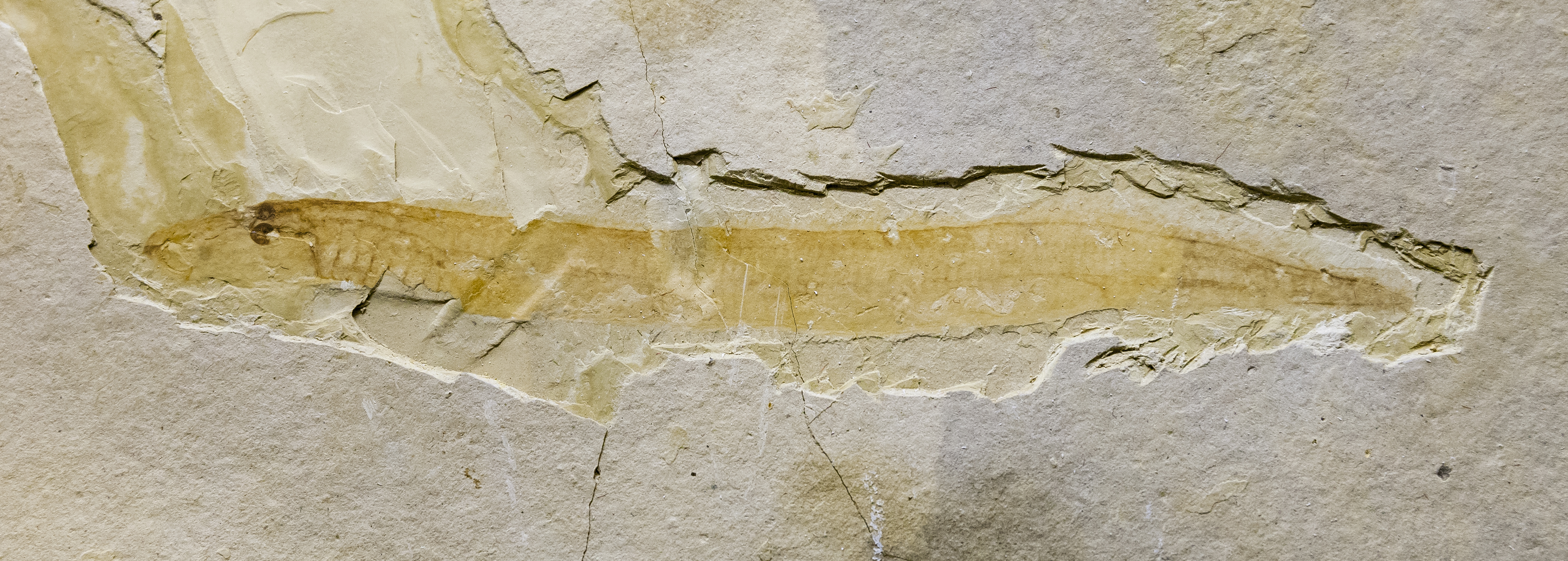
Fossil of the related Mesomyzon

== Paleoenvironment ==
The fossil material of both Caeruleum species was discovered in layers of the Jiufotang Formation, which dates to the Aptian age (122.1±0.3 Ma) of the Early Cretaceous period. Huang et al. (2024) suggested that Caeruleum inhabited a brackish freshwater environment. Well-preserved fossils of many other animals, including non-avian dinosaurs, early birds, pterosaurs, mammals, turtles, lizards, and fish, have also been found in the Jiufotang Formation.
