= Hebeimyzon =

Hebeimyzon Temporal range: Early Cretaceous (Barremian–Aptian), ~123–119 Ma

Scientific classification
- Kingdom: Animalia
- Phylum: Chordata
- Infraphylum: Agnatha
- Superclass: Cyclostomi
- Class: Petromyzontida
- Order: Petromyzontiformes
- Family: Petromyzontidae
- Genus: †Hebeimyzon; Guo, 2022
- Species: †H. weichangensis

Binomial name
- †Hebeimyzon weichangensis Guo, 2022

Extinct genus of lampreys

Hebeimyzon (meaning "Hebei sucker") is an extinct genus of lamprey known from the Early Cretaceous Jiufotang Formation of China. The genus contains a single species, Hebeimyzon weichangensis, known from three nearly complete specimens preserved as parts and counterparts.

== Discovery and naming ==
The Hebeimyzon fossil material was discovered in outcrops of the Jiufotang Formation near Shixia Village, of Hebei Province, China. It is known from three specimens, all of which comprise a nearly complete animal preserved as a part and counterpart in lateral view. The holotype specimen, MHGU4270, and one paratype specimen, MHGU4271, are similarly-sized adult individuals. An additional paratype specimen, MHGU4272, is a nearly complete juvenile individual, notably smaller than the two adult individuals.

In 2022, Xinyu Guo described Hebeimyzon weichangensis as a new genus and species of lamprey based on these fossil remains. The generic name, Hebeimyzon, combines the pinyin word Hebei (河北), the province in which the specimens were discovered, with the Greek myzon, meaning "sucker". The specific name, weichangensis, references the discovery of the specimen in Weichang Manchu and Mongol Autonomous County in Hebei Province.

== Description ==
Size of the three known specimens compared to a human hand

The Hebeimyzon specimens exhibit some variation in size. The paratype juvenile individual is 17 centimetres (6.7 in) long, while the mature holotype and paratype specimens are 24.2 cm (9.5 in) and 26.5 cm (10.4 in), respectively. This is significantly larger than most other fossil lampreys and is comparable to some extant species. Like modern lampreys, Hebeimyzon has seven gill pouches positioned behind the eye. The anterior and posterior dorsal fins and the caudal fin are all positioned on the rear part of the body. The anterior dorsal fin is small and low. In contrast, the posterior dorsal fin is longer and higher, with a general triangular shape. The narrow caudal fin wraps around the tip of the tail and has a lanceolate shape (much longer than wide). As preserved, the oral disc (circular sucking mouth) in Hebeimyzon is convex in lateral (side) view. Whether this is the result of taphonomy—distortion or damage to that region in the known fossils—is unclear.

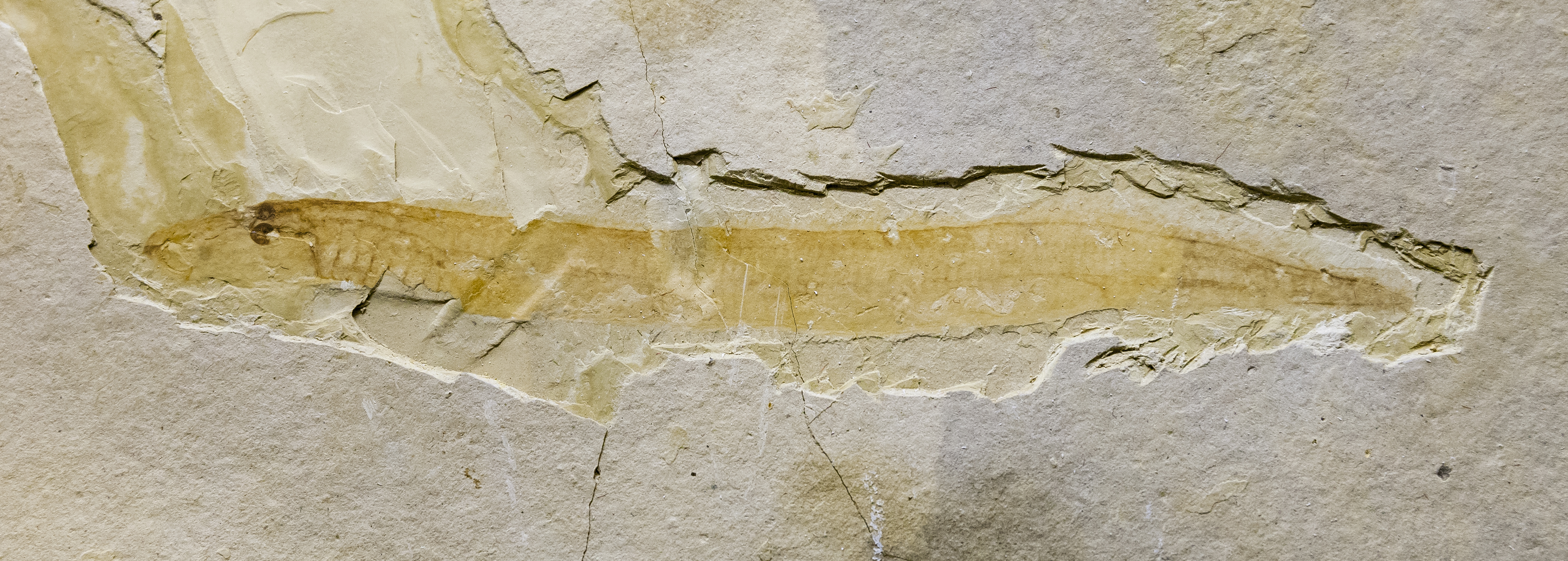
Fossil of Mesomyzon, a Chinese lamprey also known from Early Cretaceous rocks

In comparison, Caeruleum miraculum, also from the Jiufotang Formation, and Mesomyzon mengae, from the coeval Yixian Formation, have longer anterior dorsal fins that originate near the gill pouches at the front part of the body. These species were also similar in size to Hebeimyzon; C. miraculum has an average length of less than 29 cm (11 in) and M. mengae has a maximum known length of 21.7 cm (8.5 in).

== Paleoenvironment ==
The fossil material of Hebeimyzon was discovered in layers of the Jiufotang Formation, which dates to the Aptian age (constrained to 122.0–118.9 Ma) of the early Cretaceous period. Two species of the fellow extinct lamprey Caeruleum—C. miraculum and C. gracilis—have also been described from the formation. They are interpreted as having inhabited a brackish freshwater environment. Well-preserved fossils of many other animals, including non-avian dinosaurs, early birds, pterosaurs, mammals, turtles, lizards, and fish, have also been found in the Jiufotang Formation.
