= Sam Giles =

Paleontologist

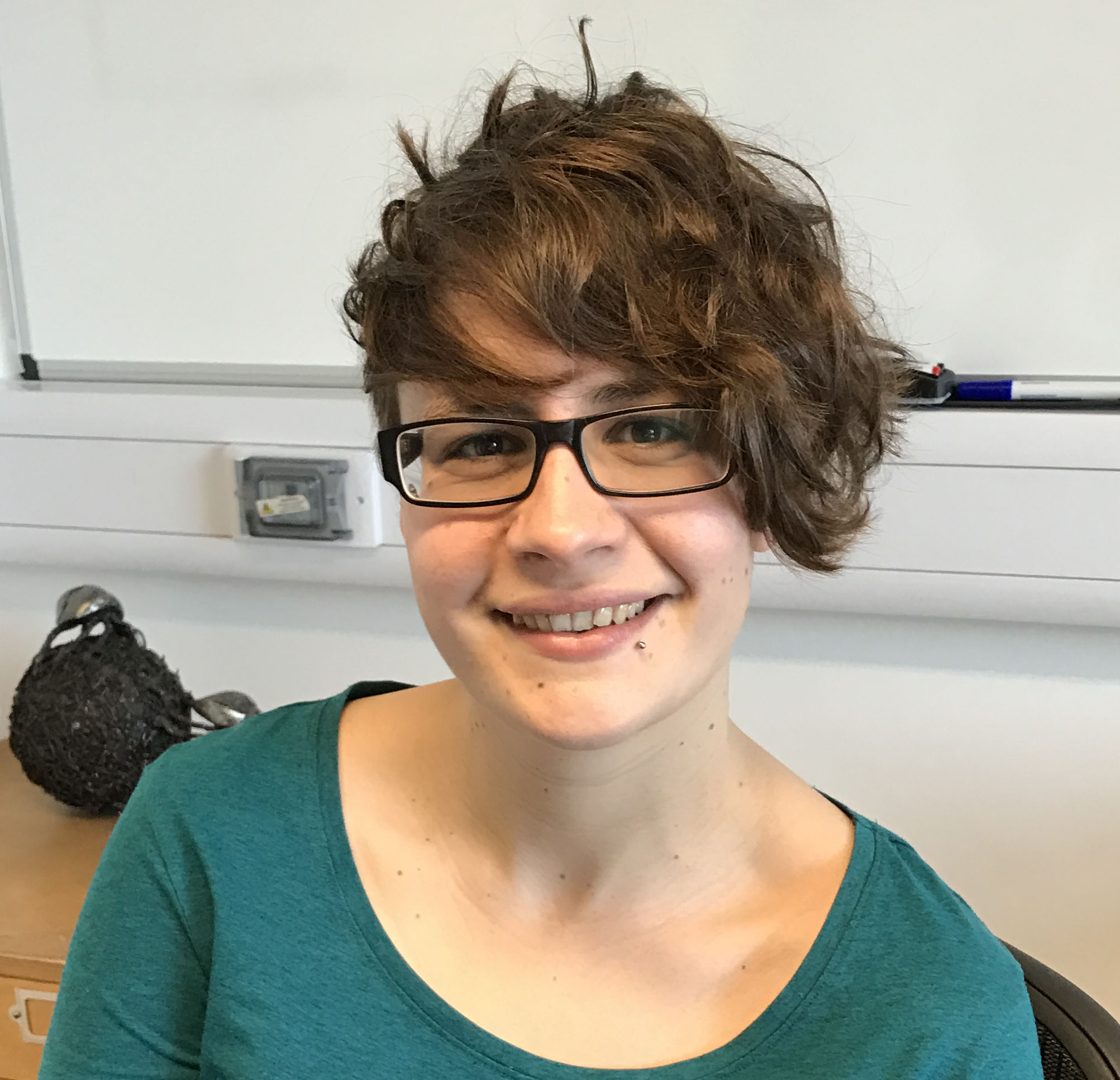
- Giles in 2017
- Education: University of Bristol (BSc); University of Oxford (DPhil)
- Awards: L'Oréal-UNESCO For Women in Science Awards (2017)
- Scientific career
- Fields: Actinopterygii; Acanthodii; Placodermi; Virtual Palaeontology
- Workplaces: University of Oxford
- Thesis: How to build a bony vertebrate in evolutionary time (2015)
- Doctoral advisor: Matt Friedman
- Website: https://www.birmingham.ac.uk/staff/profiles/gees/giles-sam.aspx

Sam Giles is a palaeobiologist and Professor in Vertebrate Palaeontology at the University of Birmingham. Her research combines modern imaging with fossils to understand the evolution of life, in particular that of early fish, and in 2015 "rewrote" the vertebrate family tree. She was a 2017 L'Oréal-UNESCO Rising Star and won the 2019 Geological Society of London Lyell Fund.

== Early life and education ==
Giles studied geology at the University of Bristol, graduating in 2011. Giles completed her doctor of philosophy at the University of Oxford in 2015, where she was a member of St Hugh's College. She worked with Matt Friedman on early ray-finned fishes.

== Career and research ==
In 2015, Giles was appointed a junior research fellow at Christ Church, Oxford. Giles was awarded a L'Oréal-UNESCO fellowship in 2016, which would allow her to study the anatomy of vertebrate's brains. In 2017, Giles was awarded a Royal Society Dorothy Hodgkin Fellowship to study the evolution of the Actinopterygii, otherwise known as ray-finned fishes, which comprise more than half of all living vertebrates. In 2018, she joined the School of Geography, Earth & Environmental Sciences at the University of Birmingham as a member of academic staff.

Giles uses x-ray tomography to study the bone structure of Actinopterygii and is one of the leading experts on the evolutionary relationships and adaptations of early fish. In particular, she has been involved in research related to the origin of gnathostomes, or jawed vertebrates, and the relationships of early fishes, including various extinct groups such as placoderms and the divergence of chondrichthyans (cartilaginous fish) and osteichthyans (bony fish). She has also published on the early evolution of the dermal skeleton. A foundational component of her work is the use of computed tomography (CT) scanning in order to study the internal anatomy of fossils and to reconstruct the soft tissue structures that are not directly preserved. Giles is also a major contributor to research relating to equitable practices in academia and paleontology. Giles' research has been published in leading scientific journals, including Nature, eLife, Current Biology, and Proceedings of the Royal Society B and has been covered by numerous media outlets. She has contributed to naming numerous new species of extinct fish, outlined below:

Year	Taxon	Authors
2018	Pickeringius acanthophorus sp. nov.	Choo, Lu, Giles, Trinajstic, & Long
2018	Scopulipiscis saxciput gen. et sp. nov.	Latimer & Giles
2017	Ptctolepis brachynotus gen. et sp. nov.	Lu, Giles, Friedman, & Zhu
2015	Janusiscus schultzei gen. et sp. nov.	Giles, Friedman, & Brazeau
2015	Raynerius splendens gen. et sp. nov.	Giles, Darras, Clément, Blieck, & Friedman

She has written for the HuffPost and given several popular science lectures. In 2019, Giles was awarded the Geological Society of London Lyell Fund, which is awarded to researchers on the basis of outstanding published research. She serves on the council of the Palaeontological Association and the Palaeontographical Society.

== Personal life ==
Giles is gay and is included in 500 Queer Scientists.
