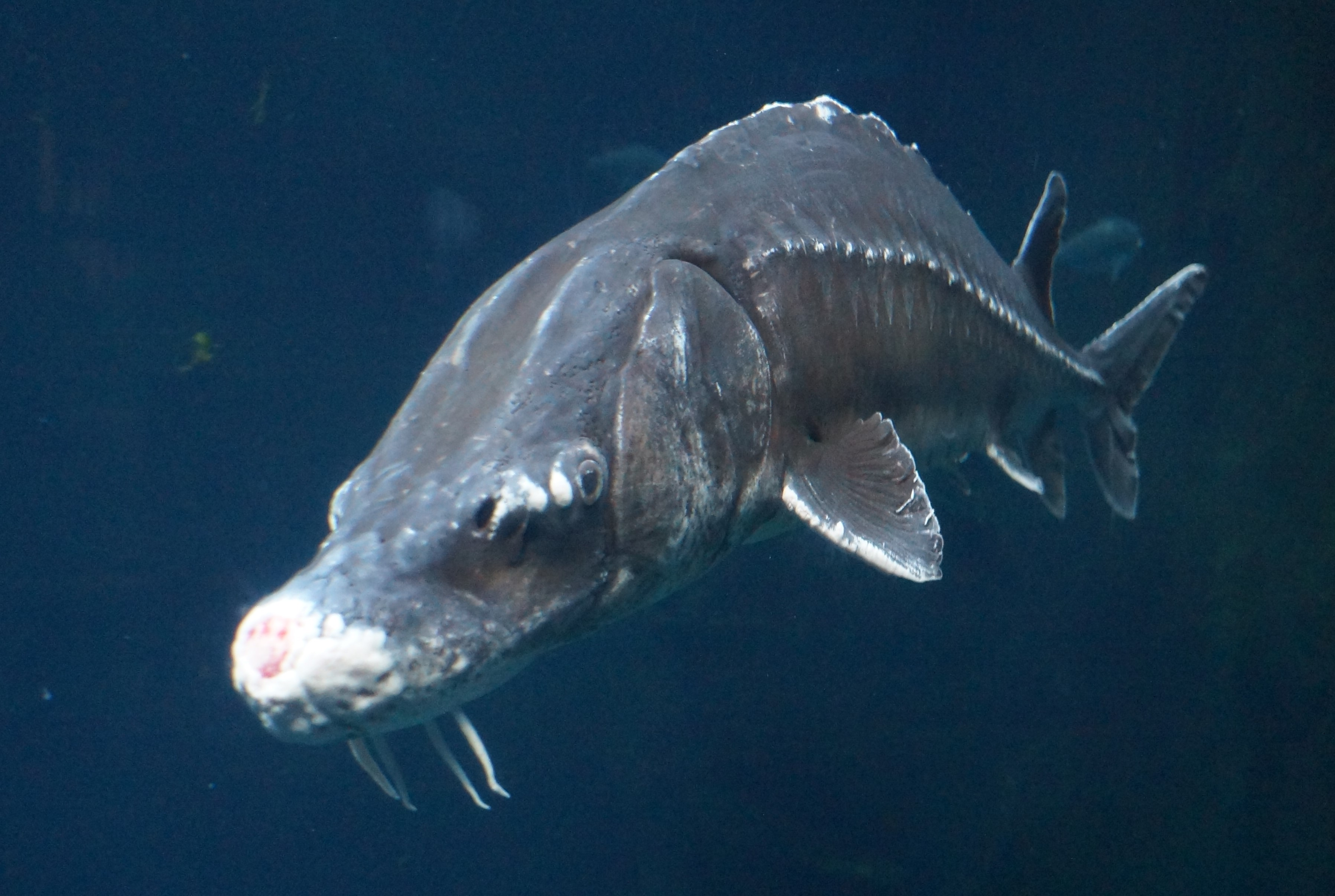
- Atlantic sturgeon (Acipenser oxyrinchus)

Scientific classification
- Kingdom: Animalia
- Phylum: Chordata
- Class: Actinopterygii
- Order: Acipenseriformes
- Family: Acipenseridae
- Genus: Acipenser; Linnaeus, 1758

Type species
- Acipenser sturio Linnaeus, 1758

Species
- see text

Synonyms
- Dinoctus Rafinesque 1818; Sturio Rafinesque 1810; Acipenser (Euacipenser) Murgoci 1942

= Acipenser =

Acipenser Temporal range: 70.6–Present Ma

Genus of fishes

Acipenser is a genus of sturgeons, containing three species native to freshwater and estuarine systems of eastern North America and Europe. It is the type genus of the family Acipenseridae and the order Acipenseriformes.

== Taxonomy ==
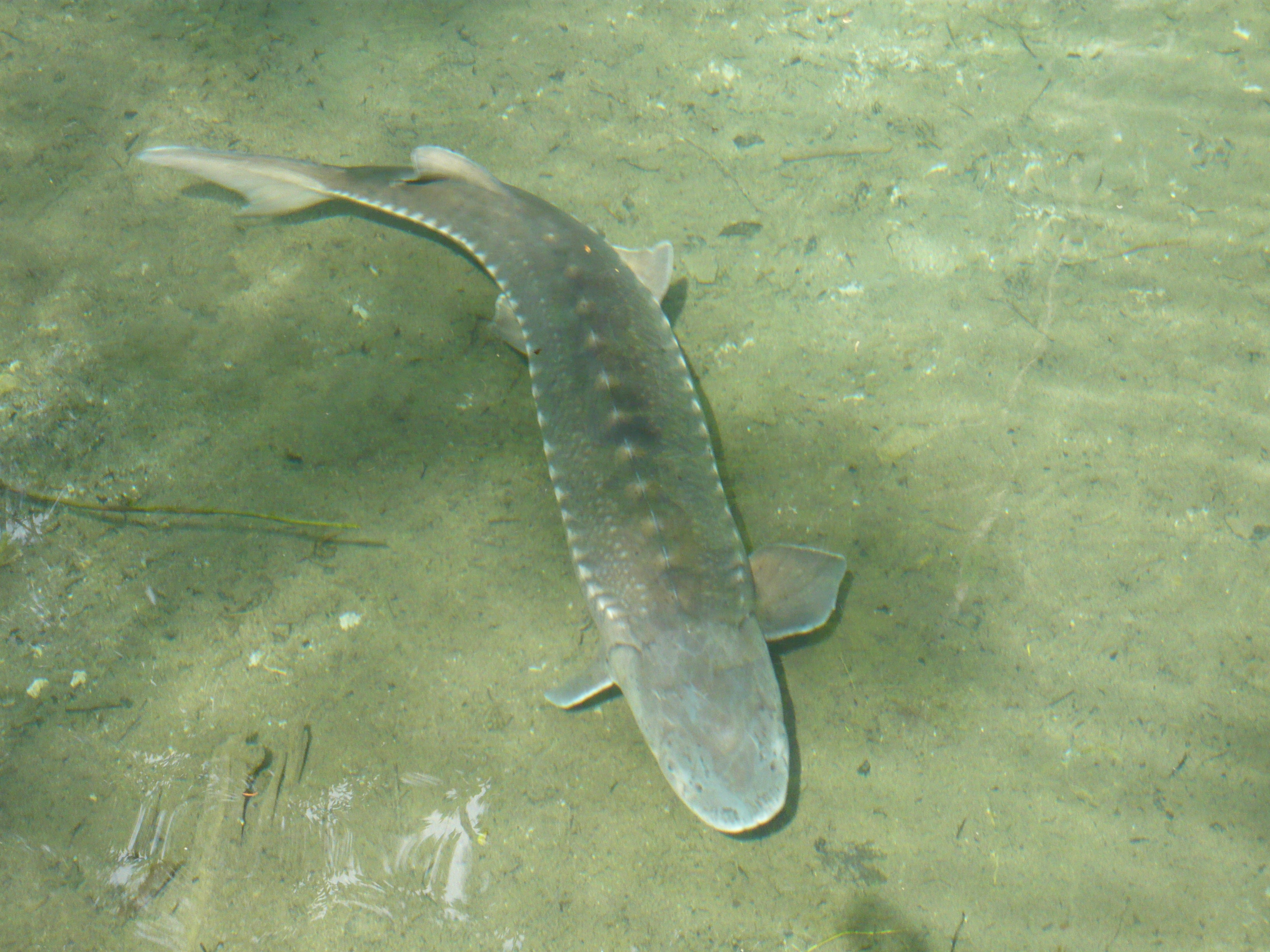
Acipenser sturio is the type species of the genus

The genus name Acipenser is Latin for "sturgeon" which is derived from ἀκκιπήσιος akkipesios in Greek from the words akís ἀκίς meaning "point", and πέντε pénte meaning "five" referring to the five rows of sharp scutes found on its body. Prior to 2025, Acipenser contained almost all species in the Acipenseridae outside of Huso and the "shovelnose" sturgeons (Scaphirhynchus and Pseudoscaphirhynchus). However, such a placement is now known to be paraphyletic with respect to the other genera, and these species have since been split into Huso and Sinosturio. Acipenser in the strict sense (sensu stricto) has been redefined with only 3 species.

This is an ancient genus, with phylogenetic evidence suggesting that it is the sister lineage to all other sturgeon genera, having diverged from other sturgeons during the Early Cretaceous period. Several fossil species known as far back as the Late Cretaceous, with the fossils of two species (A. praeparatorum and A. amnisinferos) known from mass mortality assemblages thought to immediately follow the Chicxulub impact, the beginning of the Cretaceous-Paleogene extinction event. However, the classification of these fossil species is uncertain under the new taxonomy; for example, "Acipenser" praeparatorum may actually represent a more derived sturgeon related to the Huso-Pseudoscaphirhynchus lineage.

=== Extant species ===
The following four species are placed in this genus:

- Acipenser desotoi Vladykov, 1955 (Gulf sturgeon)
- Acipenser fulvescens Rafinesque, 1817 (Lake Sturgeon)
- Acipenser oxyrinchus Mitchill, 1815 (Atlantic sturgeon)
- Acipenser sturio Linnaeus, 1758 (type species) (European sea sturgeon)

=== Fossil species ===
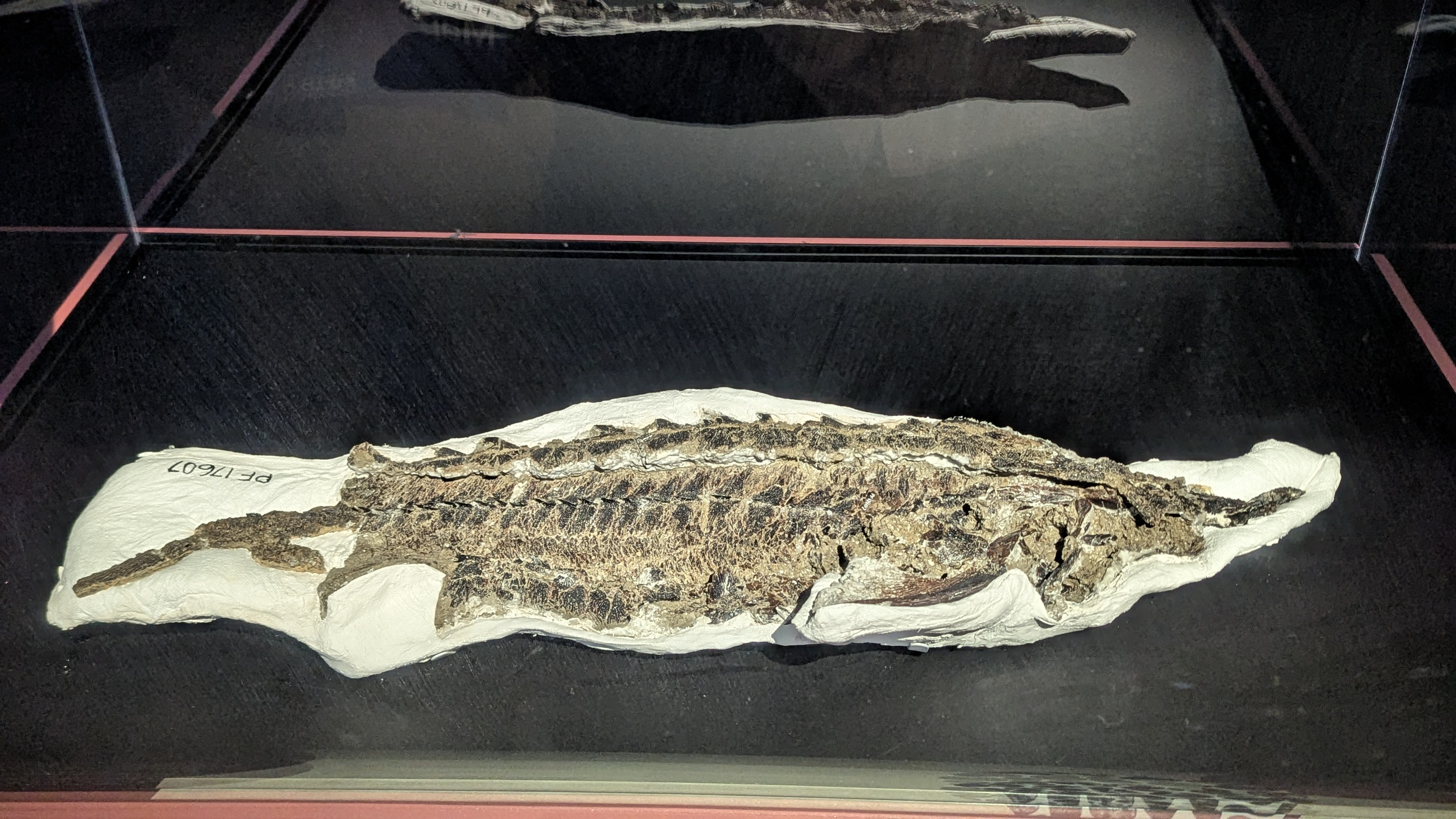
Acipenser praeparatorum fossil from the Tanis site

The following species are known from fossil remains, under a sensu lato interpretation of the genus. Almost all aside from A. amnisinferos and A. praeparatorum are thought to be nomina dubia.

- †Acipenser albertensis Lambe, 1902 (Late Cretaceous of Alberta, Canada)
- †Acipenser amnisinferos Hilton & Grande, 2023 (Late Cretaceous of North Dakota, USA)
- †Acipenser chilini Nessov, 1983 (Early Paleocene of Kazakhstan)
- ?†Acipenser cretaceous Daimeries, 1892 (Late Cretaceous of Belgium; potentially a teleost)
- †Acipenser eruciferus Cope, 1876 (Late Cretaceous of Montana, USA)
- †Acipenser gigantissimus Nessov, 1997 (Late Cretaceous of Saratov, Russia)
- †Acipenser lemoinei (Priem, 1901) (Early Eocene of France)
- ?†Acipenser molassicus Probst, 1882 (Miocene of Germany; potentially a chondrichthyan)
- †Acipenser ornatus Leidy, 1873 (Miocene of Virginia, USA)
- †Acipenser parisiensis Priem, 1908 (Early Oligocene of France)
- †Acipenser praeparatorum Hilton & Grande, 2023 (Late Cretaceous of North Dakota, USA)
- †Acipenser toliapicus Agassiz 1844 ex Woodward 1889 (Early Eocene of England)
- ?†Acipenser tuberculosus Probst 1882 (Miocene of Germany; potentially a chondrichthyan)
- †Acipenser zhylgensis Nessov, 1983 (Early Paleocene of Kazakhstan)
