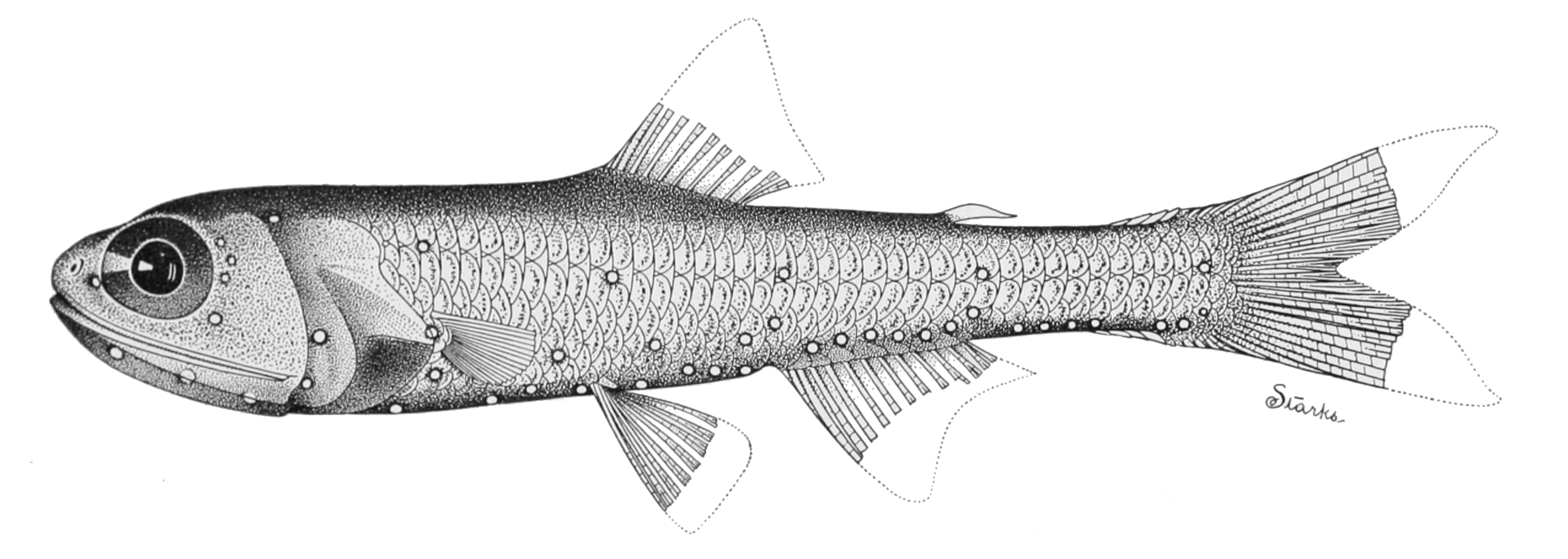
- Spurcheek Lanternfish (B. photothorax)
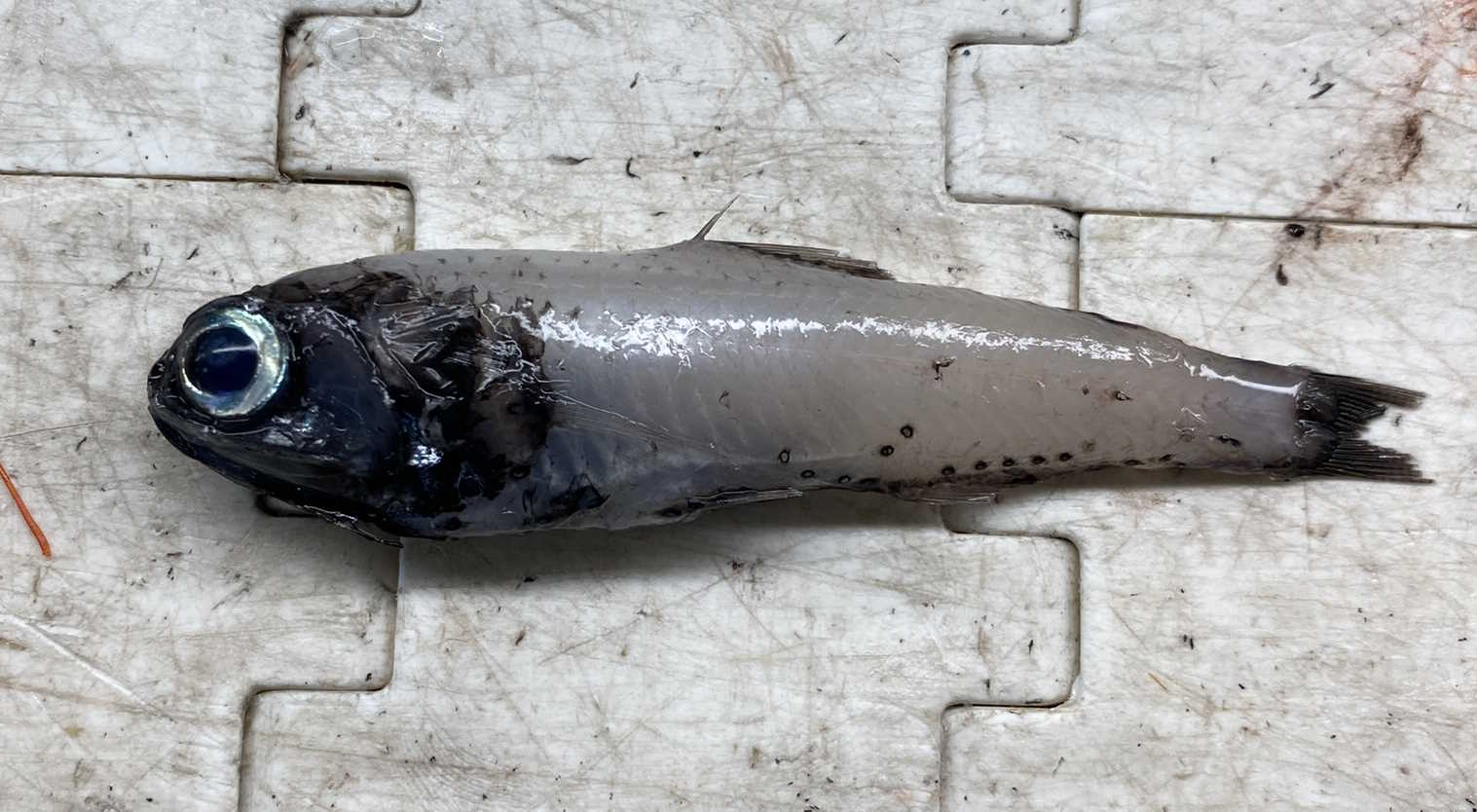
- Specimen of Bolinichthys supralateralis from the North Atlantic

Scientific classification
- Kingdom: Animalia
- Phylum: Chordata
- Class: Actinopterygii
- Order: Myctophiformes
- Family: Myctophidae
- Genus: Bolinichthys; Paxton, 1972

Species
- See text

Synonyms
- Bolinichthyes (misspelling)

= Bolinichthys =

Bolinichthys Temporal range: Early Miocene–present

Genus of fishes

Bolinichthys is a genus of lanternfishes.

== Etymology ==
The genus is named in honour of Rolf Ling Bolin (1901–1973), an ichthyologist and lanternfish specialist from the Hopkins Marine Station.

== Species ==
The currently recognized species in this genus are:

- Bolinichthys distofax R. K. Johnson, 1975
- Bolinichthys indicus (B. G. Nafpaktitis & M. K. Nafpaktitis, 1969) (lanternfish)
- Bolinichthys longipes (A. B. Brauer, 1906) (popeye lampfish)
- Bolinichthys nikolayi Becker, 1978 (Nikolay's lanternfish)
- Bolinichthys photothorax (A. E. Parr, 1928) (spurcheek lanternfish)
- Bolinichthys pyrsobolus (Alcock, 1890) (fiery lanternfish)
- Bolinichthys supralateralis (A. E. Parr, 1928) (stubby lanternfish)
