= Acipenser amnisinferos =

Acipenser amnisinferos Temporal range: latest Maastrichtian

Scientific classification
- Kingdom: Animalia
- Phylum: Chordata
- Class: Actinopterygii
- Order: Acipenseriformes
- Family: Acipenseridae
- Genus: Acipenser
- Species: †A. amnisinferos

Binomial name
- †Acipenser amnisinferos Hilton & Grande, 2022

Species of extinct fish

Acipenser amnisinferos is an extinct fossil species of sturgeon known from the latest Cretaceous of North Dakota, US.

== Discovery and naming ==
Acipenser amnisinfernos is known from the Hell Creek Formation, specifically from the Tanis site. As with many other species from the site, the specimens of the A. amnisinferos may have been killed in the immediate aftermath of the K-Pg extinction. They were first collected in 2010, before being described in 2022. The holotype FMNH PF17629 is known from a skull, pectoral girdle, and several frontal scales. A second specimen is also referred, being a much smaller individual.

The specific epithet is derived from the Latin words of amnis and infernos. The word amnis meaning creek or stream and infernos is derived from infernus meaning hellish, referring to the place it was found being Hell Creek.

== Description ==
Acipenser amnisinfernos can be identified with a prolonged snout compared to other species and a lack of thorns on the skull. The front of the skull is covered by long, and narrow hind rostral bones and border rostral bones. The ornamentation of Acipenser amnisinfernos is flattened rather than being well-defined.

== Classification ==
Due to the fragmentary nature of the specimen, phylogenetic analysis has been difficult, with it being left out in a paper in 2025. Acipenser amnisinfernos is similar to that of the starry sturgeon with the long snouts, potentially suggesting a biogeographic connection, more phylogenetic studies would be needed to prove this.

== Paleobiology ==
Acipenser amnisinfernos like other species in its genus would have likely started life in freshwater before maturing and migrating back to saltwater. After reaching sexual maturity Acipenser amnisinfernos would have migrated back to freshwater to spawn eggs.
