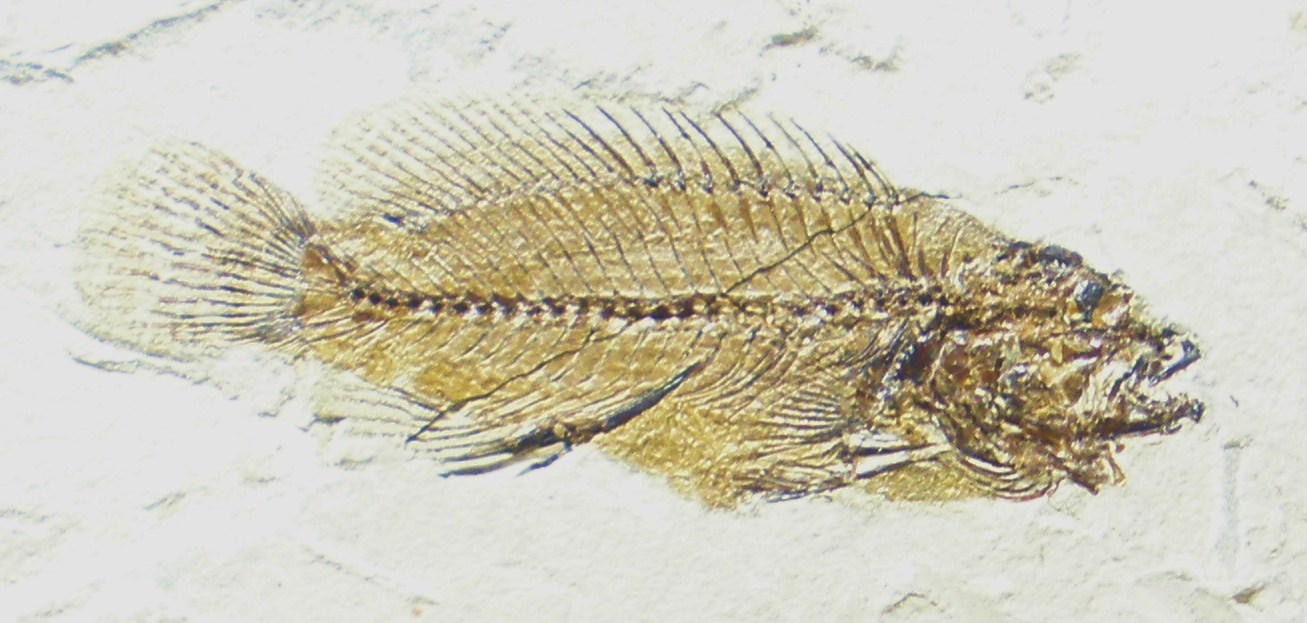
- Fossil specimen

Scientific classification
- Domain: Eukaryota
- Kingdom: Animalia
- Phylum: Chordata
- Class: Actinopterygii
- Clade: Percomorpha
- Genus: †Bradyurus; Gill, 1904

Type species
- †Crenilabrus szajnochae de Zigno, 1887

Species
- †B. alessandroi Bannikov & Zorzin, 2022; †B. szajnochae (de Zigno, 1887)

Synonyms
- Eolabroides Eastman, 1914

= Bradyurus =

Bradyurus Temporal range: Early Eocene

Extinct genus of fishes

Bradyurus (Greek for "slow tail") is an extinct genus of marine ray-finned fish that lived during the Eocene. It contains two species, both known from the Ypresian-aged Monte Bolca site of Italy.

The following species are known:

- B. alessandroi Bannikov & Zorzin, 2022
- B. szajnochae (de Zigno, 1887) (type species) (=Crenilabrus szajnochae de Zigno, 1887)

The type species was initially described as a species of Crenilabrus, which was then moved to Symphodus when the former was found to be the synonym of the latter. It was later moved to its own genus, Eolabroides by Eastman, but this was found to be a synonym of an earlier-described genus, Bradyurus.

Initially considered an early wrasse, it is now thought to be an indeterminate percomorph, though it may be potentially related to grunts.

== See also ==
- Prehistoric fish
- List of prehistoric bony fish
