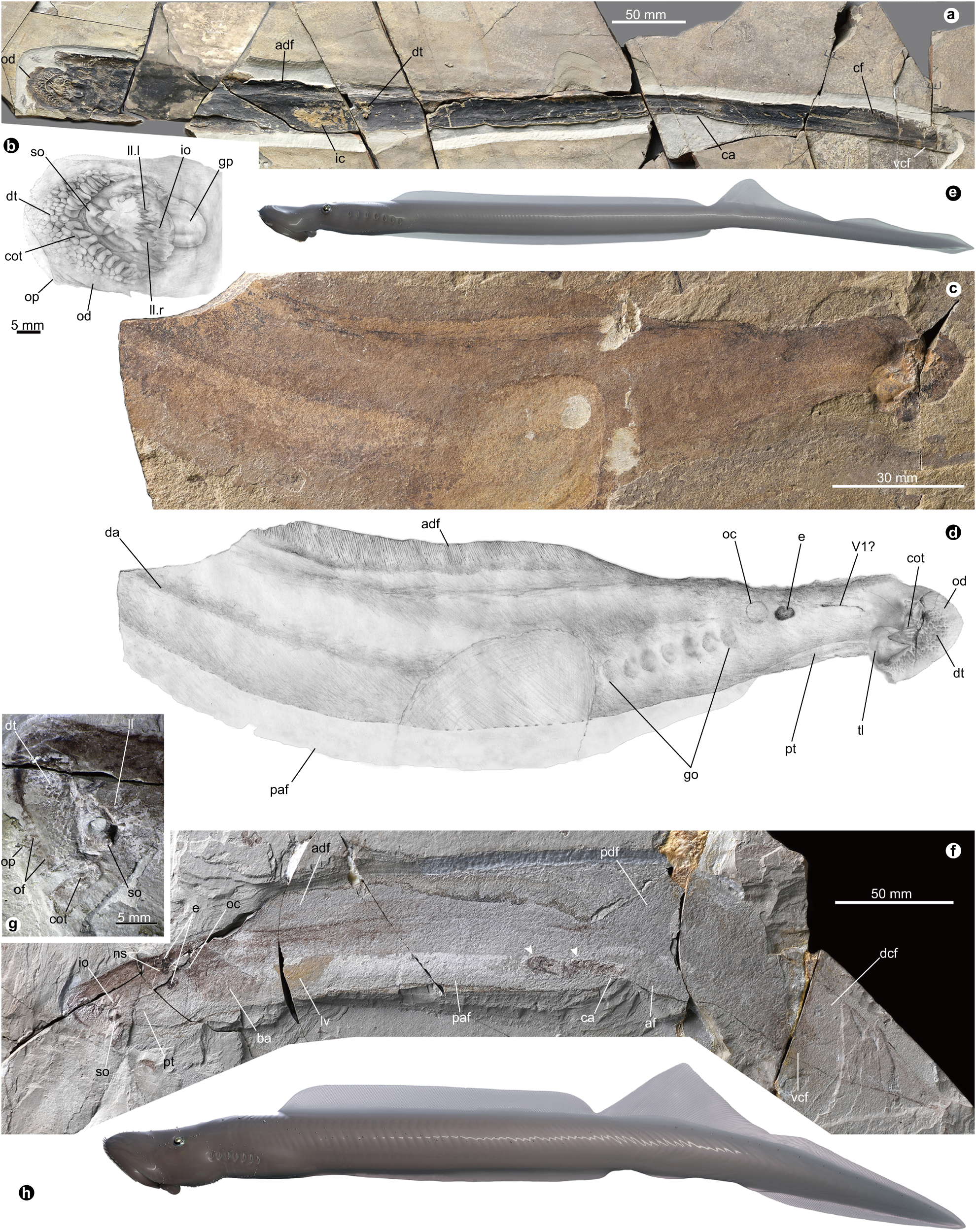
- Fossils and life restorations of Y. occisor (a-e) and Y. ingensdentes (f-h)

Scientific classification
- Kingdom: Animalia
- Phylum: Chordata
- Infraphylum: Agnatha
- Superclass: Cyclostomi
- Class: Petromyzontida
- Order: Petromyzontiformes
- Genus: †Yanliaomyzon; Wu, Janvier & Zhang, 2023

Species
- †Yanliaomyzon occisor Wu, Janvier & Zhang, 2023 (type); †Yanliaomyzon ingensdentes Wu, Janvier & Zhang, 2023

= Yanliaomyzon =

Yanliaomyzon Temporal range: Middle Jurassic, Callovian

Extinct genus of predatory lampreys

Yanliaomyzon is an extinct genus of predatory lampreys that lived approximately 163 million years ago during the Middle Jurassic. It is found in the Yanliao Biota, including both the Daohugou Beds and the Tiaojishan Formation in Liaoning province, northern China. The genus has two species: Yanliaomyzon occisor and Yanliaomyzon ingensdentes. These species are significant for being the earliest lampreys to closely resemble modern species.

== Description ==
Size of both species compared to a human hand

The species Y. occisor has a body length of 64 centimetres (25 in), which would make it the largest extinct fossil lamprey discovered. Both members of this genus resemble the modern pouched lamprey (Geotria australis). Yanliaomyzon bears a toothed oral disc that is much more similar to those of modern lampreys than those of Paleozoic lampreys. The two species are distinguished by differences in the anatomy of the toothed oral disc, as well as that the tail occupies around 40% of the body length in Yanliaomyzon ingensdentes but less than 28% of the total body length in Y. occisor.

== Ecology ==
Yanliaomyzon is thought to have consumed flesh, similar to some modern lampreys. Based on its similarities to Mesomyzon, Yanliaomyzon likely had a three phase life cycle with ammocoete larvae, though no juvenile specimens are known. Both species were found in freshwater deposits, as is typical of modern lampreys. The relatively large body size suggests that the species were anadromous, migrating from the sea into freshwater to spawn.

== Taxonomy ==
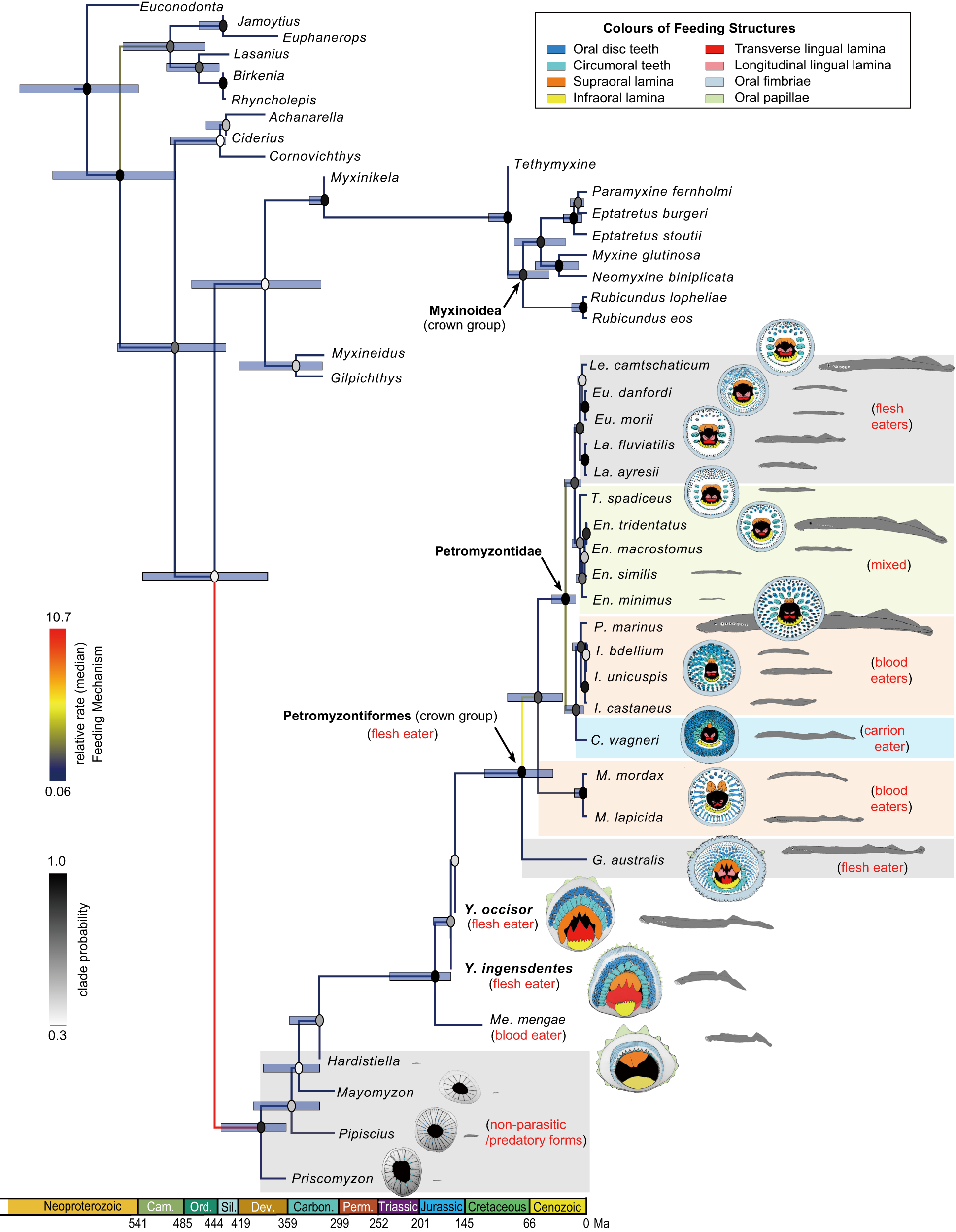
Phylogenetic analysis conducted in the study

Yanliaomyzon was found to be the closest known relative of modern lampreys (though not closely related to any specific living lamprey group), with the younger Mesomyzon from the Early Cretaceous of the same region found to be more basal.
