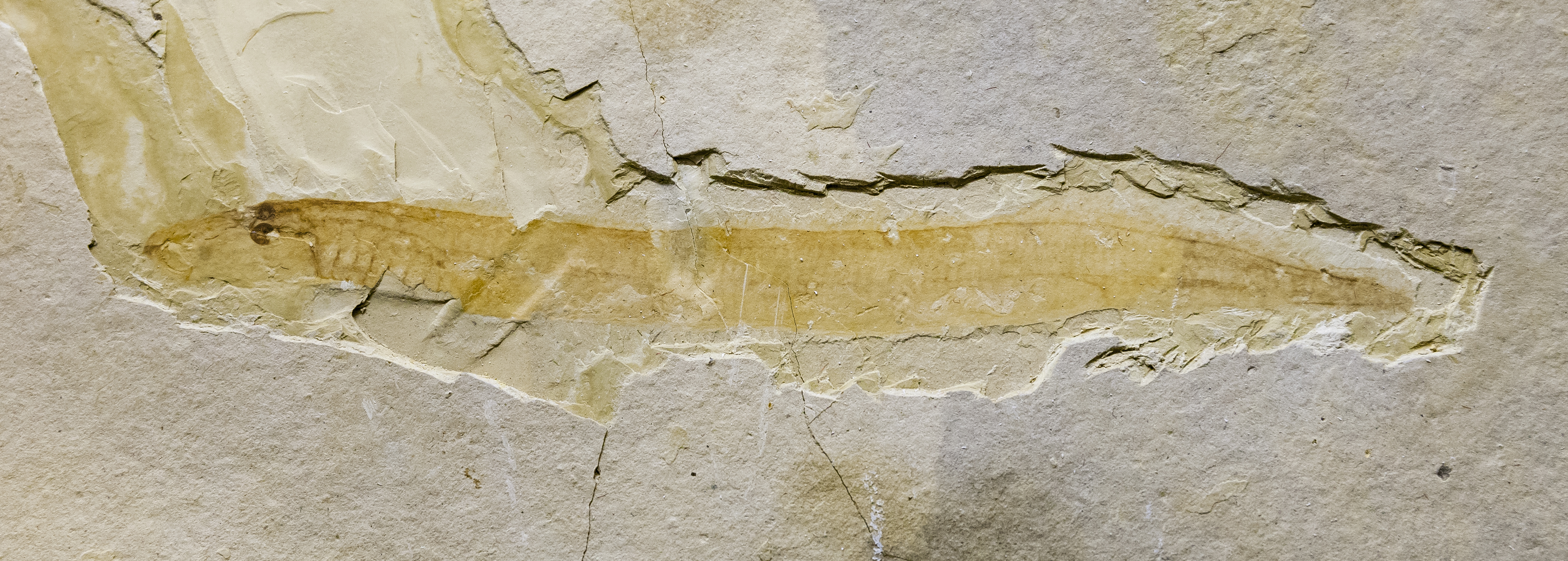
- Fossil specimen
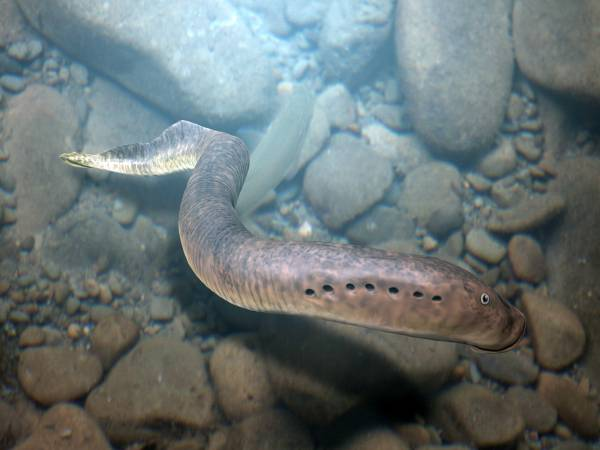
- Speculative life restoration

Scientific classification
- Kingdom: Animalia
- Phylum: Chordata
- Infraphylum: Agnatha
- Superclass: Cyclostomi
- Class: Petromyzontida
- Order: Petromyzontiformes
- Genus: †Mesomyzon; Chang, Zhang & Miao 2006
- Species: †M. mengae

Binomial name
- †Mesomyzon mengae Chang, Zhang & Miao 2006

= Mesomyzon =

Mesomyzon Temporal range: Early Cretaceous Barremian–Aptian

Extinct genus of lampreys

Mesomyzon is an extinct lamprey genus from freshwater strata of the Early Cretaceous (Barremian–Aptian age) Yixian Formation of China. It contains a single species, M. mengae.

Mesomyzon's exquisitely preserved fossils show a creature very similar to modern-day lampreys, having a well-developed sucking oral disk, a branchial basket, at least seven pairs of gill pouches and corresponding gill arches, impressions of gill filaments, and at least 80 myomeres of its musculature. Its anterior (first) dorsal fin was very long, running down 44%-48% of its body, and it had a ribbon-like preanal skin fold not known in any other lamprey. It had the same three-phase life cycle found in modern lampreys.

A phylogenetic analysis conducted in 2018 shows that Mesomyzon is the fossil lamprey most closely related to modern taxa, though it is not closely related to any modern group. On the other hand, Brownstein & Near (2022) found it to be a member of the lamprey crown group, most closely related to Petromyzontidae. However, a 2023 study found it again to be a derived stem lamprey, with the earlier Yanliaomyzon from the same region found to be more closely related to modern lampreys. This study also suggested Mesomyzon to be a blood feeder.
