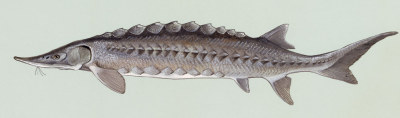
- Atlantic sturgeon, Acipenser oxyrinchus

Scientific classification
- Kingdom: Animalia
- Phylum: Chordata
- Class: Actinopterygii
- Subclass: Chondrostei; Müller, 1844

Orders
- See text

= Chondrostei =

Chondrostei Temporal range: Early Jurassic–Recent

Subclass of fishes

Chondrostei is a subclass of non-neopterygian ray-finned fish. While the term originally referred to the paraphyletic grouping of all non-neopterygian ray-finned fish, it was redefined by Patterson in 1982 to be a clade comprising the Acipenseriformes (which includes sturgeon and paddlefish) and their extinct relatives. The ancestors of Chondrostei are thought to have split from those of other living fish around the Carboniferous period (360–300 million years ago). The oldest unambiguous members of Acipenseriformes known from the Early Jurassic (201–175 million years ago).

Taxa commonly suggested to represent relatives of the Acipenseriformes include the Triassic marine fish Birgeria and the Saurichthyiformes, but their relationship with the Acipenseriformes has been strongly challenged on cladistic grounds. Coccolepididae, a group of small weakly ossified Jurassic and Cretaceous "palaeoniscoid" fish found in both marine and freshwater environments, have also been suggested to be close relatives of the Acipenseriformes in some studies, though this has also been seriously doubted. Near & Thacker (2024) also recovered the ptycholepiform Boreosomus as a stem-acipenseriform. A 2026 study suggested that the Carboniferous palaeoniscoid Trawdenia represented an early chondrostean based on its exceptionally preserved brain anatomy.

The following taxa are known:

- Subclass Chondrostei
  - Order Acipenseriformes
    - Family †Chondrosteidae
    - Family †Peipiaosteidae
    - Suborder Acipenseroidei
      - Family Acipenseridae
      - Family Polyodontidae
- Disputed taxa include:
  - Genus †Eochondrosteus
  - Genus †Birgeria
  - Genus †Trawdenia
  - Family †Coccolepididae
  - Order †Saurichthyiformes
  - Order †Ptycholepiformes
