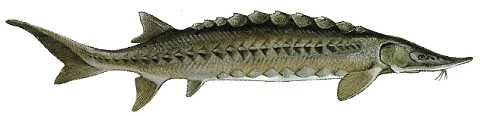
- Atlantic sturgeon (Acipenser oxyrhynchus)
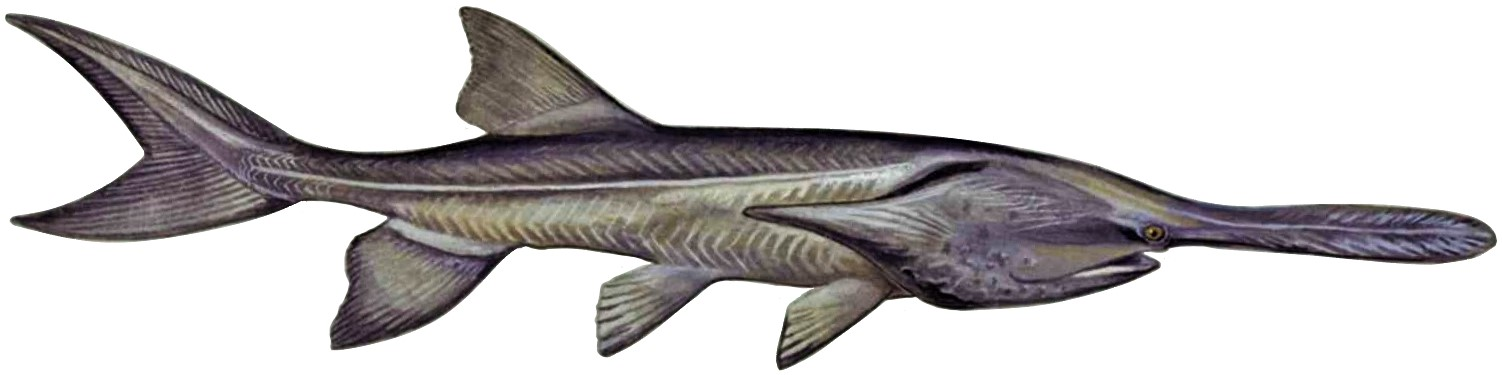
- American paddlefish (Polyodon spathula)

Scientific classification
- Kingdom: Animalia
- Phylum: Chordata
- Class: Actinopterygii
- Subclass: Chondrostei
- Order: Acipenseriformes; L. S. Berg, 1940

Subgroups
- Genus †Eochondrosteus?; Family †Chondrosteidae (sometimes placed in its own order); Family †Peipiaosteidae; Suborder Acipenseroidei; Family Acipenseridae (sturgeon); Family Polyodontidae (paddlefish)

= Acipenseriformes =

Acipenseriformes Temporal range: Early Jurassic–Present

Order of fishes

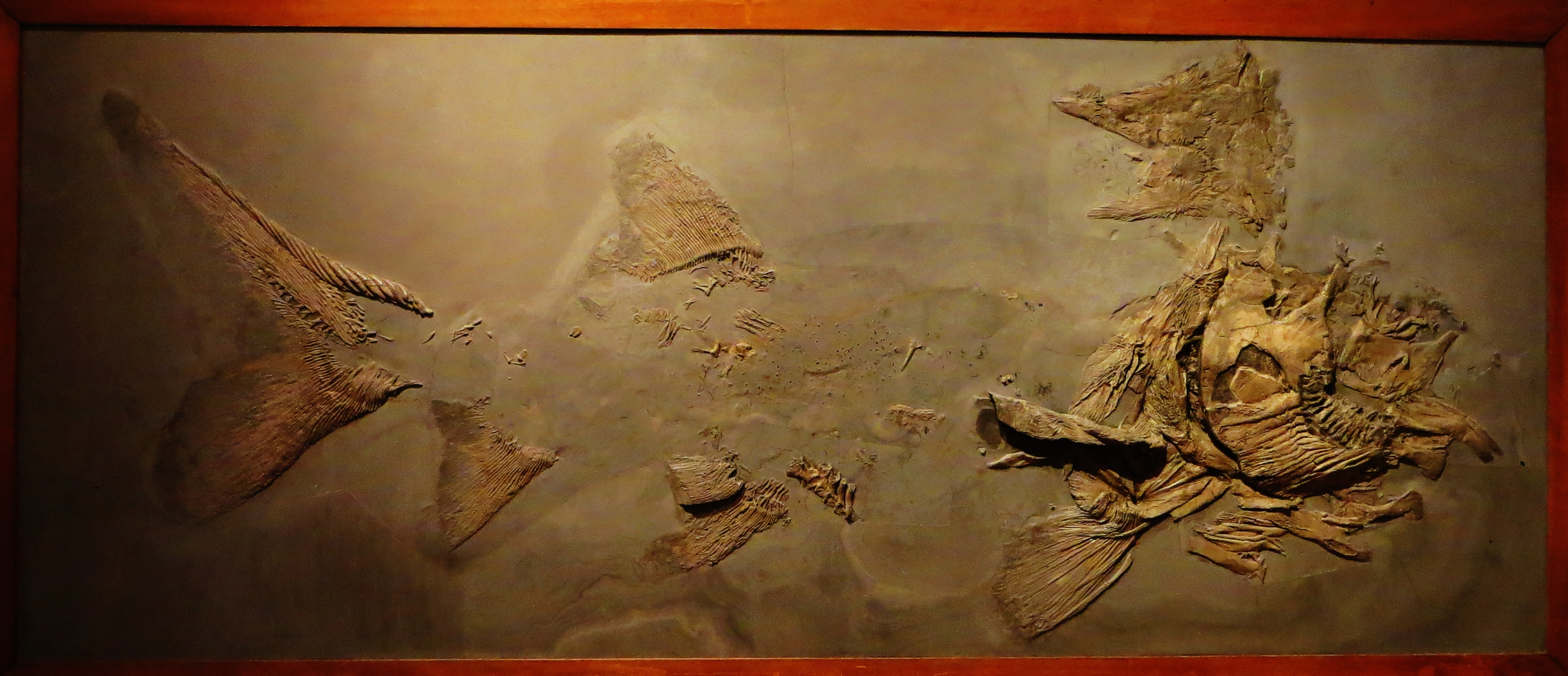
Fossil of the †chondrosteid †Strongylosteus hindenburgi, Tübingen

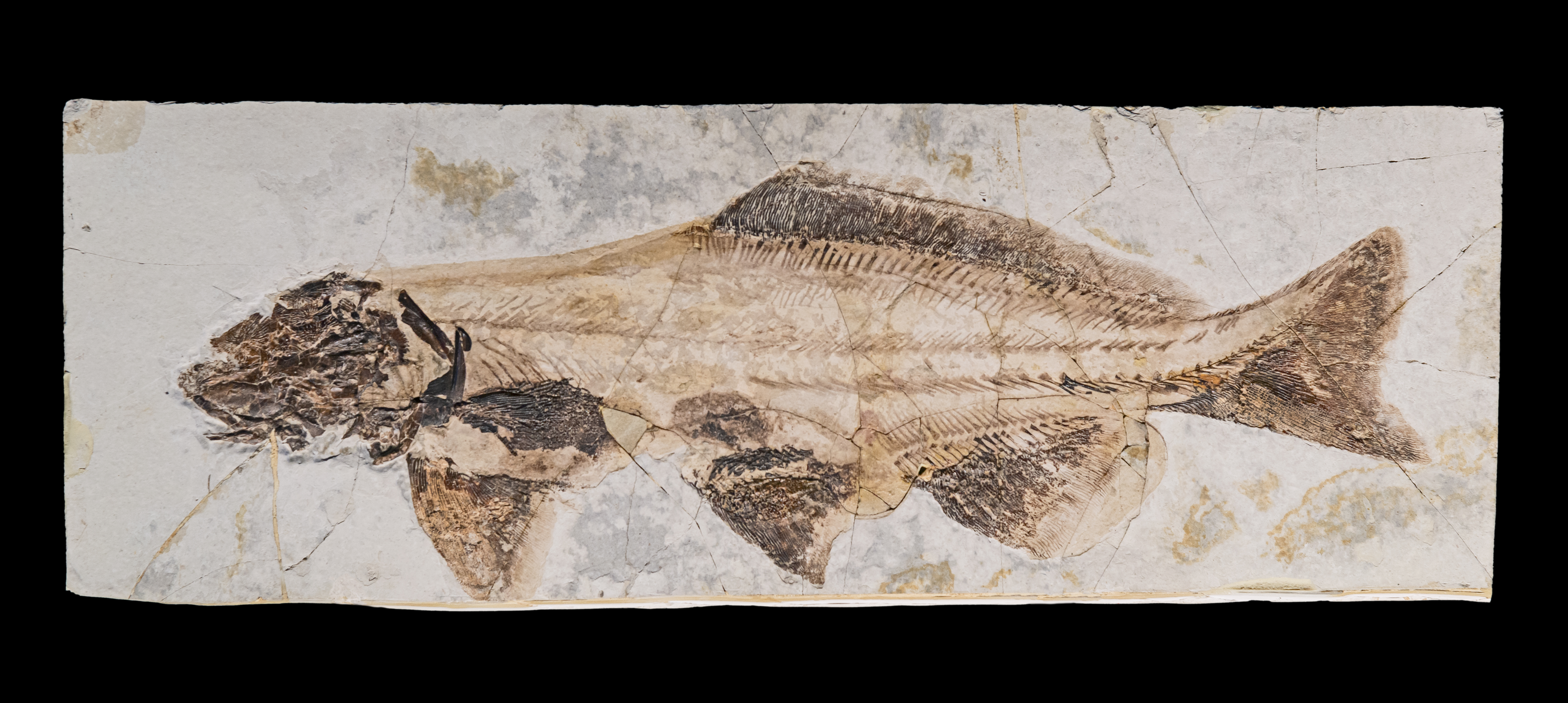
Fossil of the †peipiaosteid †Yanosteus longidorsalis, MHNT

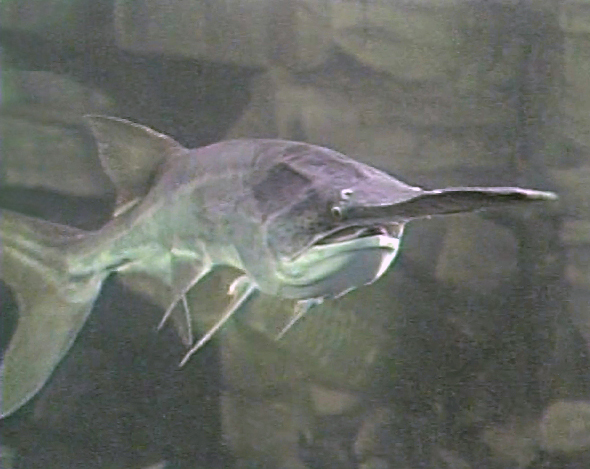
The living polyodontid Polyodon spathula (American paddlefish)

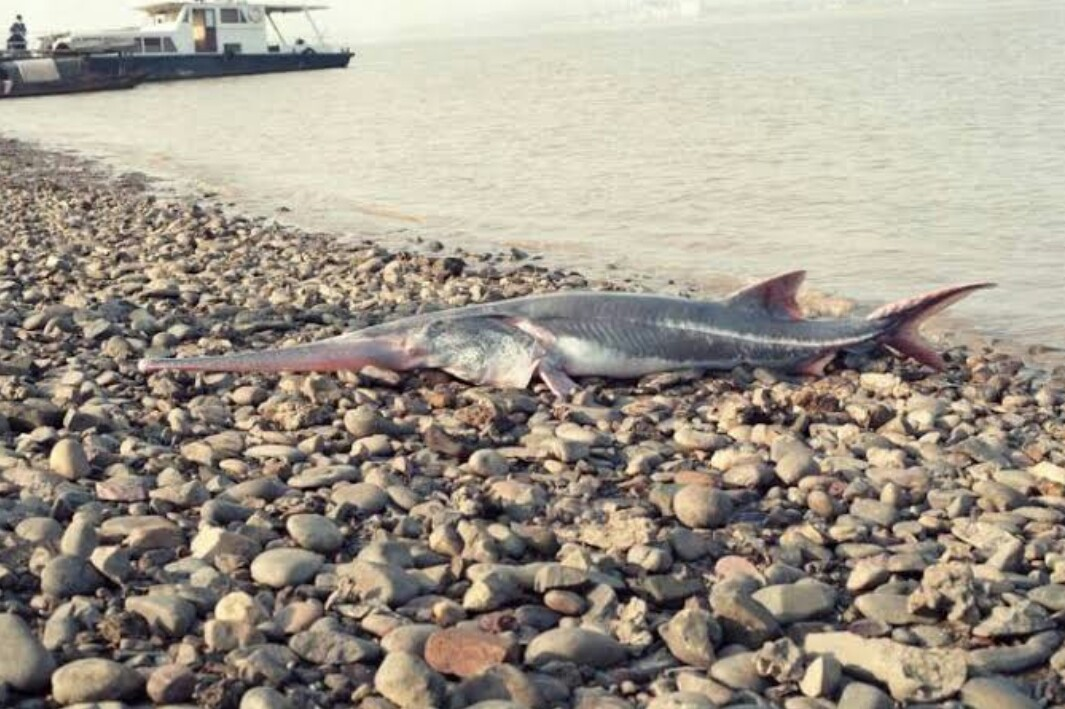
The recently extinct polyodontid Psephurus gladius (Chinese paddlefish)

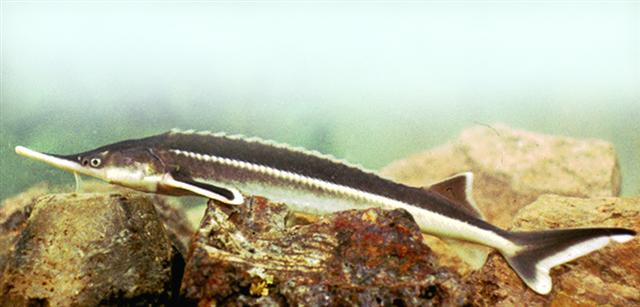
The living acipenserid Acipenser ruthenus (sterlet)

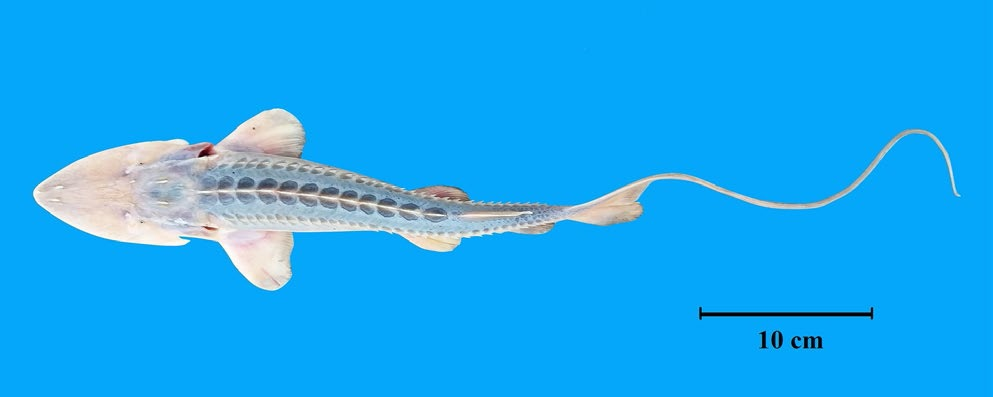
The living acipenserid Pseudoscaphirhynchus kaufmanni (false shovelnose sturgeon)

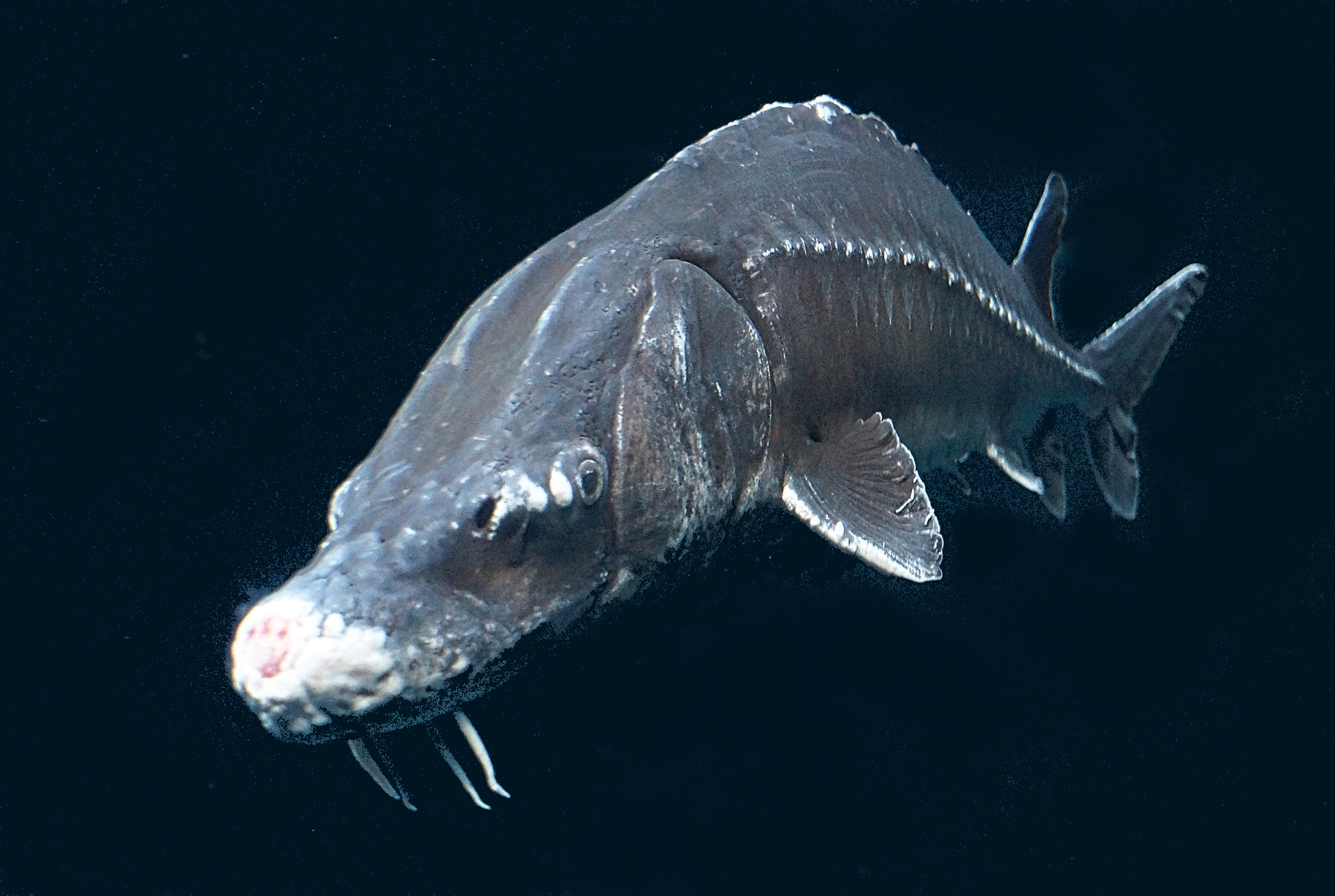
The living acipenserid Acipenser oxyrinchus (Atlantic sturgeon)

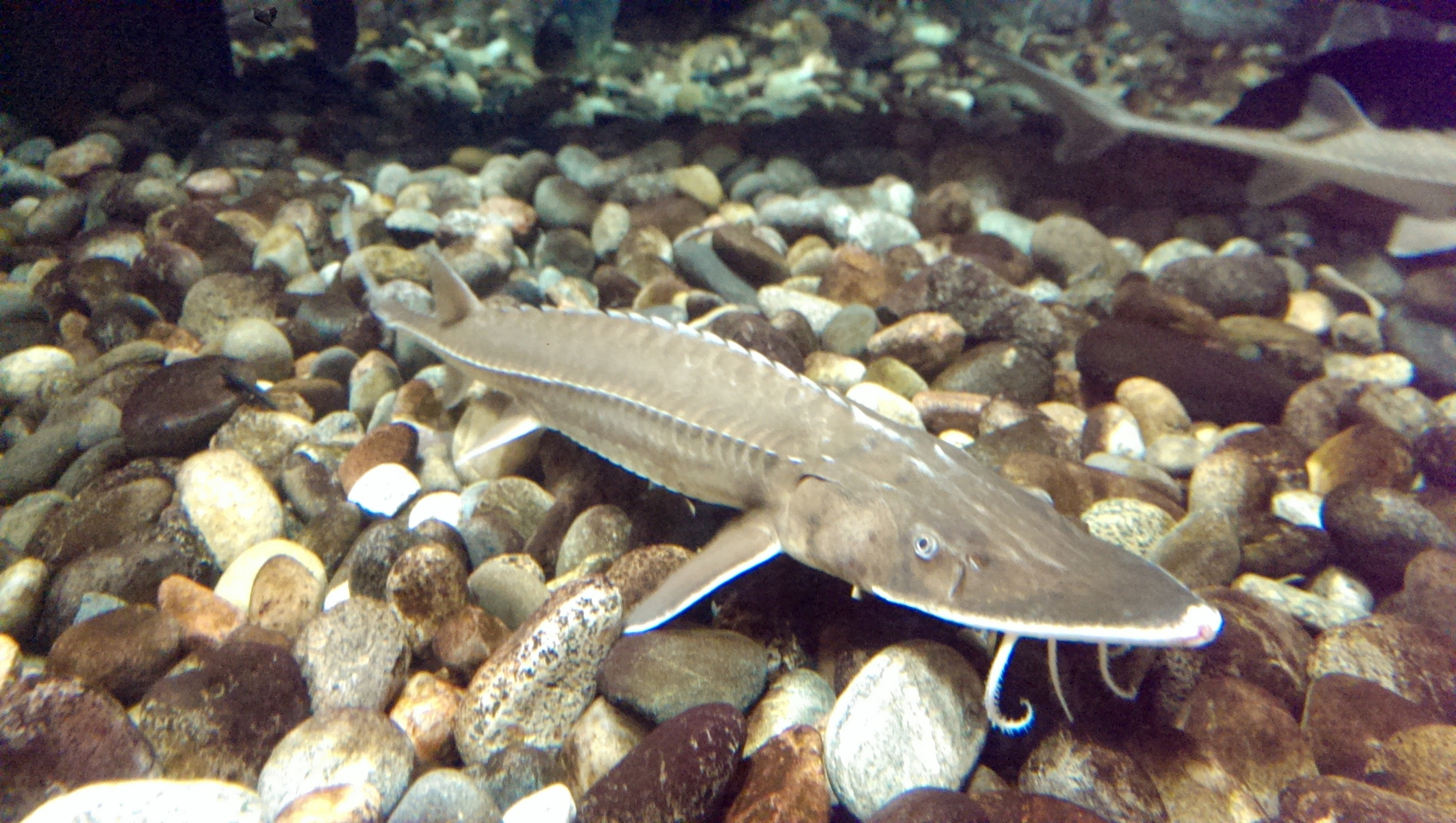
The living acipenserid Scaphirhynchus platorynchus (Shovelnose sturgeon)

Acipenseriformes /æsɪˈpɛnsərɪfɔːrmiːz/ is an order of basal ray-finned fishes that includes living and fossil sturgeons and paddlefishes (Acipenseroidei), as well as the extinct families Chondrosteidae and Peipiaosteidae. They are the second earliest diverging group of living ray-finned fish after the bichirs. Despite being early diverging, they are highly derived (modified from their ancestors), having only weakly ossified skeletons that are mostly made of cartilage, and in modern representatives highly modified skulls.

== Description ==
The axial skeleton of Acipenseriformes is only partially ossified, with the majority of the bones being replaced with cartilage. The notochord, usually only found in fish embryos, is unconstricted and retained throughout life. The premaxilla and maxilla bones of the skull present in other vertebrates have been lost. While larvae and early juvenile acipenseriforms have teeth, the adults are toothless, or nearly so. The infraorbital nerve is carried by a series of separate canals, rather than being within the circumorbital bones. The palatoquadrate bones of the skull possess a cartilaginous symphysis (joint), and also have a broad autopalatine plate, as well as a narrow palatoquadrate bridge, and a quadrate flange. The quadratojugal bone is three-pointed (triradiate), and the dentition on the gill-arch is confined to the upper part of the first arch and to only the first and second hypobranchials. Members of Acipenseriformes retain the ability to sense electric fields (electroreception) using structures called ampullae. This ability was present in the last common ancestor of all living jawed fish, but was lost in the ancestor of neopterygian fish. All acipenseriforms probably possessed barbels like modern sturgeon (which have four) and paddlefish (which have two).

== Evolutionary history ==
Acipenseriforms are assumed to have evolved from members of the "palaeoniscoid" stock of archaic ray finned fish. The ancestors of Acipenseriformes are thought to have split from those of other living fish around the Carboniferous period (360–300 million years ago). The closest fossil relatives of Acipenseriformes, placed as part of the broader group Chondrostei, are uncertain and contested. The last common ancestor of Acipenseriformes underwent a whole genome duplication event suggested to have occurred around 242–255 million years ago, with the genome subsequently undergoing rediploidization, both before the split between sturgeons and paddlefish, and separately in both lineages after the split.

Eochondrosteus from the Early Triassic (252–247 million years ago) of China has been suggested by some authors to be the oldest acipenseriform. The oldest unambiguous members of the order are the Chondrosteidae, a group of large fish found in marine deposits from the Early Jurassic (201–175 million years ago) of Europe, which already have reduced ossification of the skeleton. The Peipiaosteidae are known from Middle Jurassic-Early Cretaceous freshwater deposits in Asia. Indeterminate remains of marine Acipenseriformes are known from the Upper Jurassic of Europe. The estimated time of the divergence between sturgeons and paddlefish varies. An estimate based on 30 protein-encoding nuclear markers suggest 204.1 million years ago, research on mitochondrial genomes suggest 155.2 million years ago, and Bayesian dating based on the combined matrix of molecular (mitogenomes) and morphological characters set the divergence to 162 (195–137) million years ago.

The oldest known paddlefish is Protopsephurus from the Early Cretaceous of China around 120 million years ago, while the earliest known sturgeons appear in the early Late Cretaceous in North America and Asia, around 100–95 million years ago.

== Classification ==
- Order Acipenseriformes Berg, 1940
  - Genus †Eochondrosteus? Lu, Li & Yang, 2005
  - Family †Chondrosteidae Egerton, 1858 (Also placed in the separate order Chondrosteiformes)
    - Genus †Chondrosteus Agassiz, 1833–1844
    - Genus †Gyrosteus Agassiz, 1833–1844
    - Genus †Strongylosteus Agassiz, 1833–1844
  - Family †Peipiaosteidae Liu & Zhou, 1965
    - Genus †Spherosteus Jakovlev, 1968
    - Genus †Yanosteus Jin et al., 1995
    - Genus †Liaosteus Lu, 1995
    - Genus †Peipiaosteus Liu & Zhou, 1965
    - Genus †Stichopterus Reis, 1909
  - Suborder Acipenseroidei Grande & Bemis, 1991
    - Family Polyodontidae Bonaparte, 1838 (paddlefish)
      - Genus †Protopsephurus Lu, 1994
      - Genus †Paleopsephurus MacAlpin, 1941a
      - Genus †Pugiopsephurus Hilton et al., 2023
      - Genus †Parapsephurus Hilton et al., 2023
      - Subfamily Polyodontinae Grande & Bemis, 1991 non Pflugfelder, 1934
        - Genus †Crossopholis Cope, 1883
        - Genus Polyodon Lacépède, 1797 (American paddlefish)
        - Genus †Psephurus Günther, 1873 (Chinese paddlefish)
    - Family Acipenseridae Bonaparte, 1831 sensu Bemis et al., 1997 (sturgeons)
      - Genus †Boreiosturion Murray et al. 2023
      - Genus †Protoscaphirhynchus Wilimovsky, 1956
      - Genus † Engdahlichthys Murray et al. 2020
      - Genus †Anchiacipenser Sato, Murray, Vernygora and Currie, 2019
      - Genus †Priscosturion Grande & Hilton, 2009 [Psammorhynchus Grande & Hilton, 2006]
      - Genus Acipenser Linnaeus, 1758
      - Genus Huso J. F. Brandt & Ratzeburg, 1833
      - Genus Scaphirhynchus Heckel, 1835
      - Genus Pseudoscaphirhynchus Nikolskii, 1900

== Conservation ==
Most living species of Acipenseriformes are classified as threatened (mostly endangered or critically endangered) by the International Union for Conservation of Nature.

The Chinese paddlefish was last seen alive in 2003, and was considered to have gone extinct sometime between 2005 and 2010 by the Yangtze River Fisheries Research Institute in their 2019 report. It was officially declared extinct by the IUCN in 2022.

== Hybridization ==
A study published in 2020 reported a successful hybridization between a Russian sturgeon (Acipenser gueldenstaedtii) and an American paddlefish (Polyodon spathula), indicating that the two species can breed with one another despite their lineages having been separated for hundreds of millions of years. This has marked the first successful hybridization between members of Acipenseridae and Polyodontidae.
