= Eochondrosteus =

Eochondrosteus Temporal range: Early Triassic

Scientific classification
- Domain: Eukaryota
- Kingdom: Animalia
- Phylum: Chordata
- Class: Actinopterygii
- Order: Acipenseriformes
- Genus: †Eochondrosteus; Lu, Li et Yang, 2005
- Species: †E. sinensis

Binomial name
- †Eochondrosteus sinensis Lu, Li et Yang, 2005

Extinct genus of fishes

Eochondrosteus (meaning "dawn Chondrosteus") is a genus of extinct marine actinopterygian (ray-finned fish), comprising one species, E. sinensis (monotypy) from the Early Triassic strata in Gansu Province (Beishan Hills), China (previously interpreted as Permian in age). It is suggested to be the most basal acipenseriform (sturgeon, paddlefish, and their fossil relatives). It was originally described in 2005, and then redescribed in 2020 in Chinese. Other authors have considered the placement of Eochondrosteus within the Acipenseriformes as tentative, or have expressed doubt about its placement in the order
