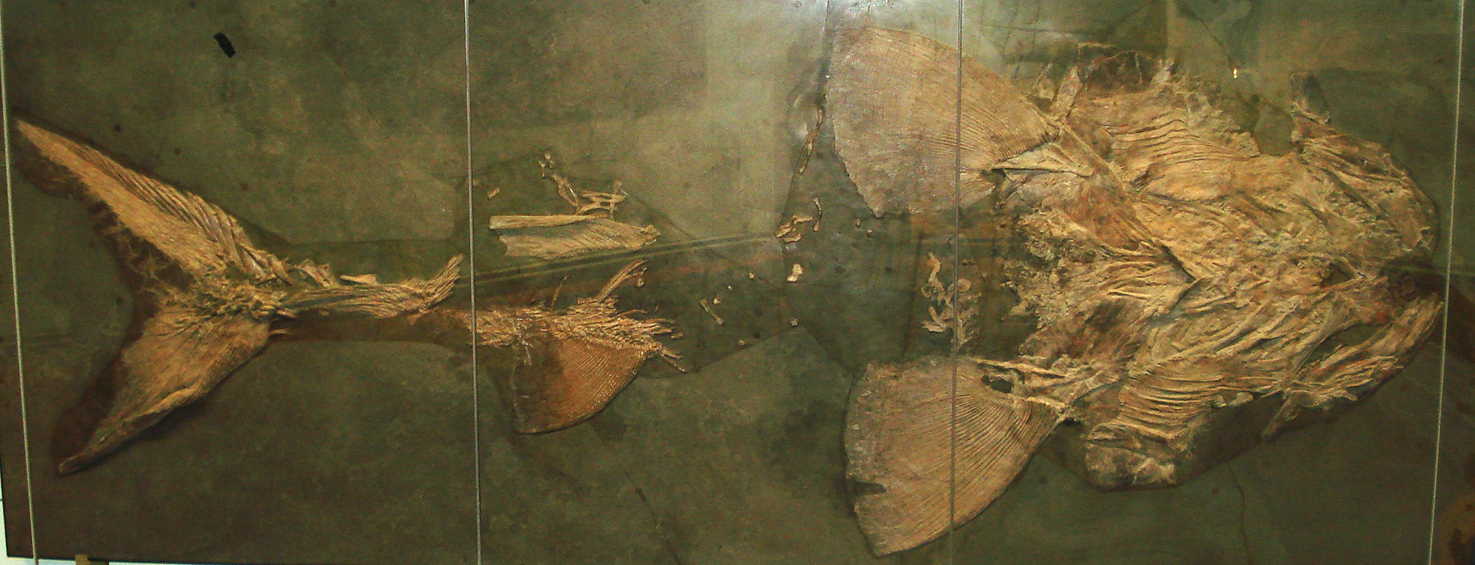
- Strongylosteus hindenburgi fossil, Staatliches Museum für Naturkunde Stuttgart

Scientific classification
- Kingdom: Animalia
- Phylum: Chordata
- Class: Actinopterygii
- Order: †Chondrosteiformes
- Family: †Chondrosteidae
- Genus: †Strongylosteus; Jaekel, 1929
- Species: †S. hindenburgi

Binomial name
- †Strongylosteus hindenburgi (Pompeckj, 1914)

Synonyms
- †Chondrosteus hindenburgi Pompeckj, 1914

= Strongylosteus =

Strongylosteus Temporal range: Early Toarcian 184–181 Ma

Extinct genus of fishes

Strongylosteus is an extinct genus of prehistoric ray-finned fish that lived during the early Toarcian age of the Early Jurassic epoch. Its type species is Strongylosteus hindenburgi (monotypy). It is related to modern sturgeon and paddlefish (Acipenseroidei).

== Discovery ==
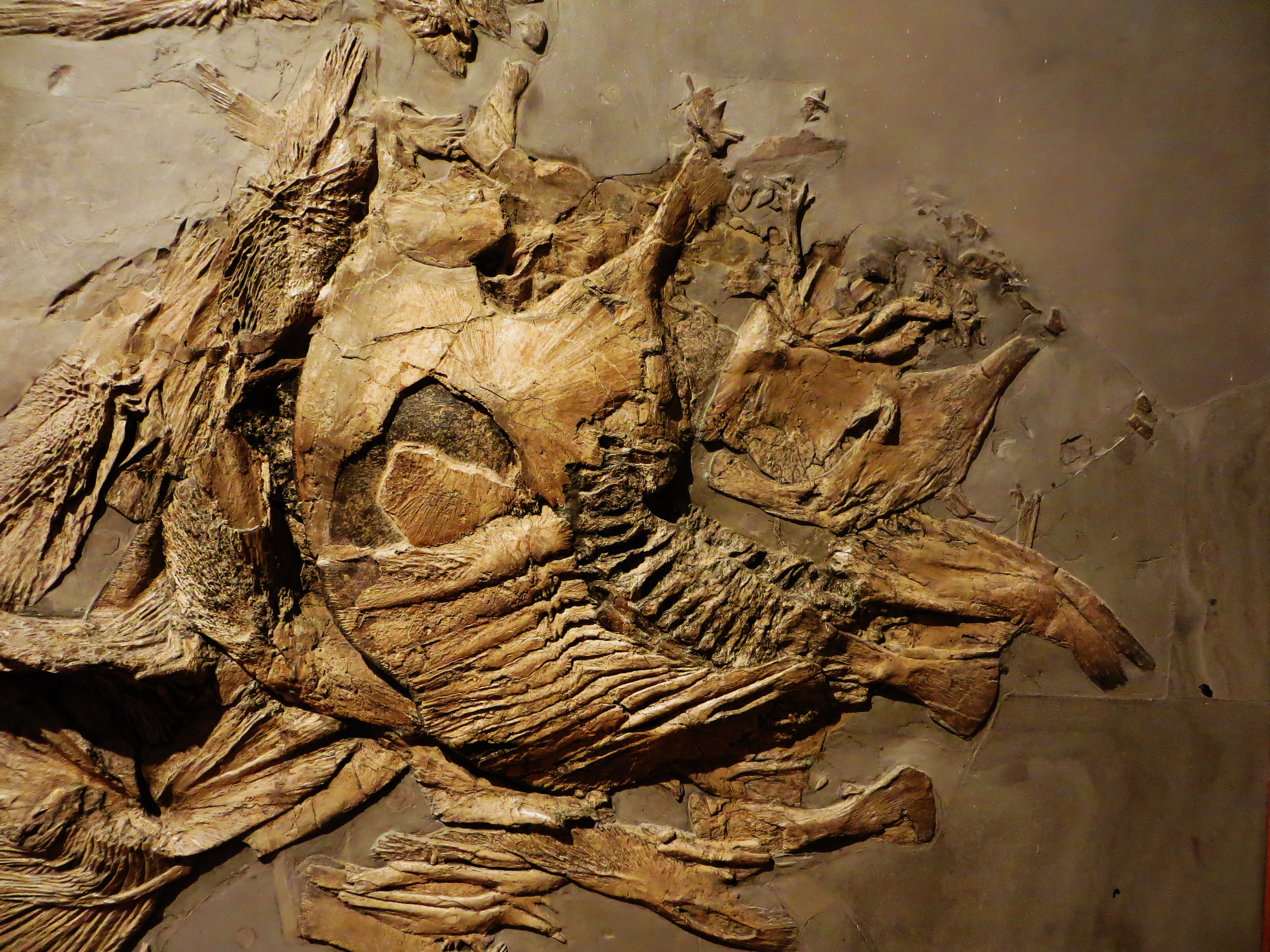
Strongylosteus hindenburgi skull close-up

Strongylosteus hindenburgi is known from the Toarcian Posidonienschiefer Formation in southwestern Germany, specifically around Holzmaden and Dotternhausen. Initially identified by Pompeckj in 1914 as "Chondrosteus hindenburgi", hovewer the name was never formally published. Hauff (1921) mentioned it as a nomen nudum, and Hennig (1925) provided the first formal description, retaining the name but describing it in detail alongside additional specimens. Jaekel (1929) later reassigned it to the new genus Strongylosteus, correcting its taxonomic position.

Since the 1925 description, over a dozen specimens, including isolated bones and partial skeletons, have been noted in various museum collections, though many remain undescribed or misidentified. This include a juvenile specimen under one meter long, present in the Urwelt Museum Hauff, awaiting formal study that may reveal ontogenic shifts.

=== Synonym with other Genera ===
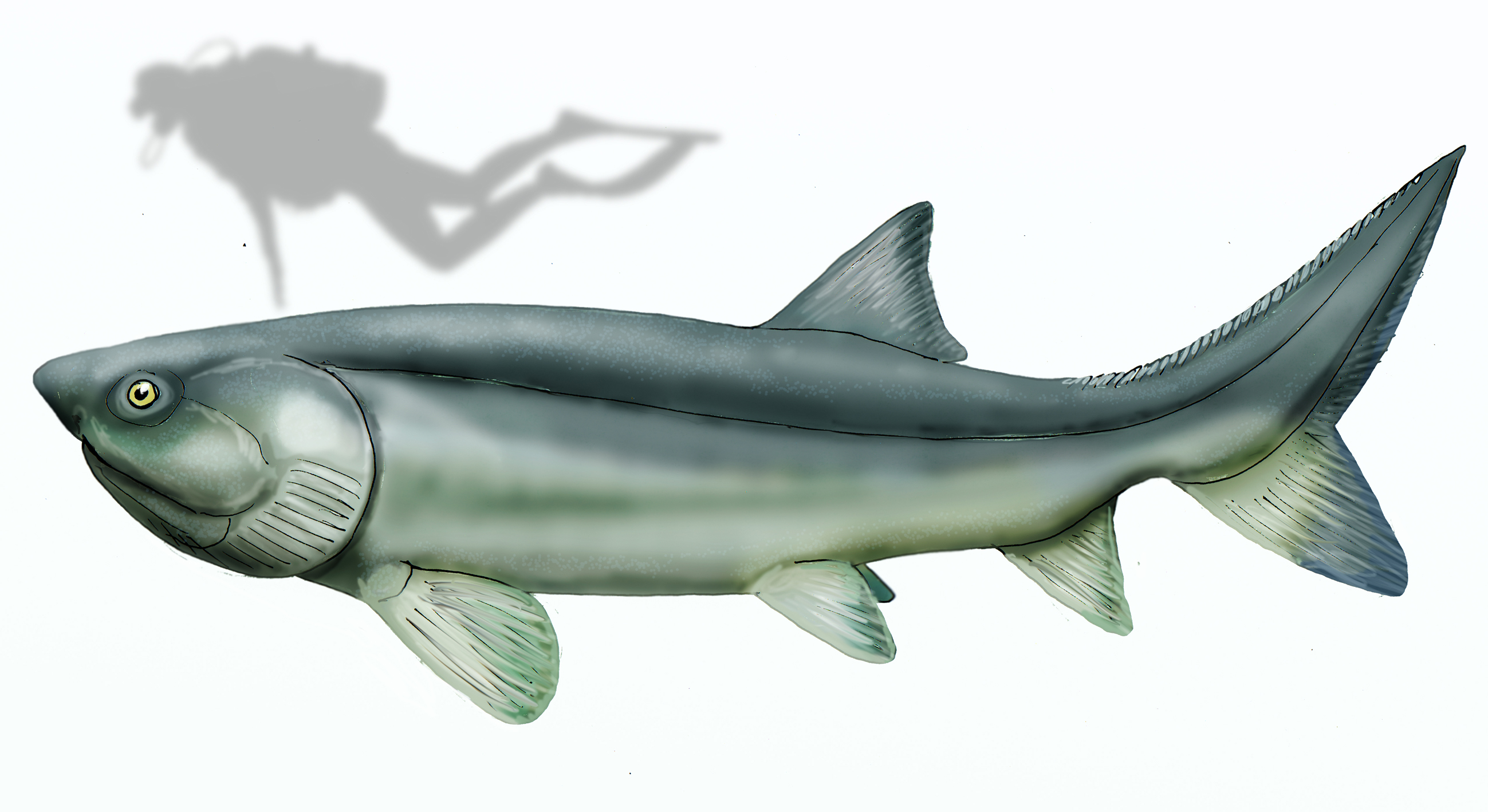
Life restoration

Strongylosteus has been suggested as a junior synonym of Chondrosteus, although there haven't been any new revisions about the status of the genus. There have also been suggestions of synonymy between Strongylosteus hindenburgi and Gyrosteus mirabilis, mainly due to incomplete descriptions and preservation issues. However, a 2025 analysis of a new skull roof from the Toarcian Whitby Mudstone corroborated Strongylosteus as a distinct genus based on skull roof differences, such as the number of rostral bones, the presence of a medial parietal, and variations in bone proportions and ornamentation patterns. The morphological distinctions are consistent across specimens, ruling out ontogenetic or intraspecific variation. Authors also pointed out that a modern redescription and phylogenetic analysis of both Strongylosteus and Gyrosteus is still necessary to clarify their evolutionary relationships within Chondrosteidae.

Strongylosteus was a large member of the family Chondrosteidae and the largest non-reptilian marine vertebrate in the Posidonia Shale, with the largest articulated specimen (SMNS 7790) measuring 3.2 m in total length.

== See also ==
- Posidonia Shale
- Gyrosteus
- Prehistoric fish
- List of prehistoric bony fish
