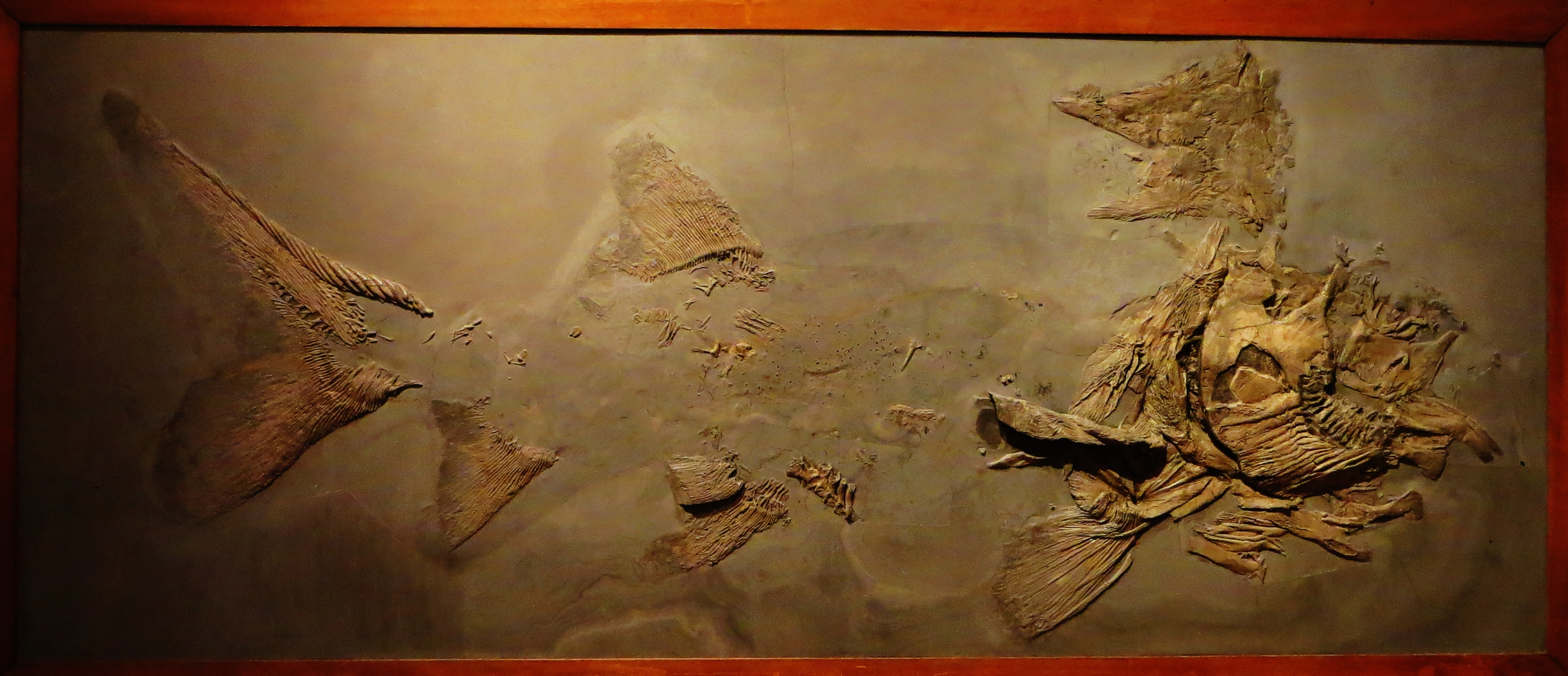
- Skeleton of Strongylosteus hindenburgi
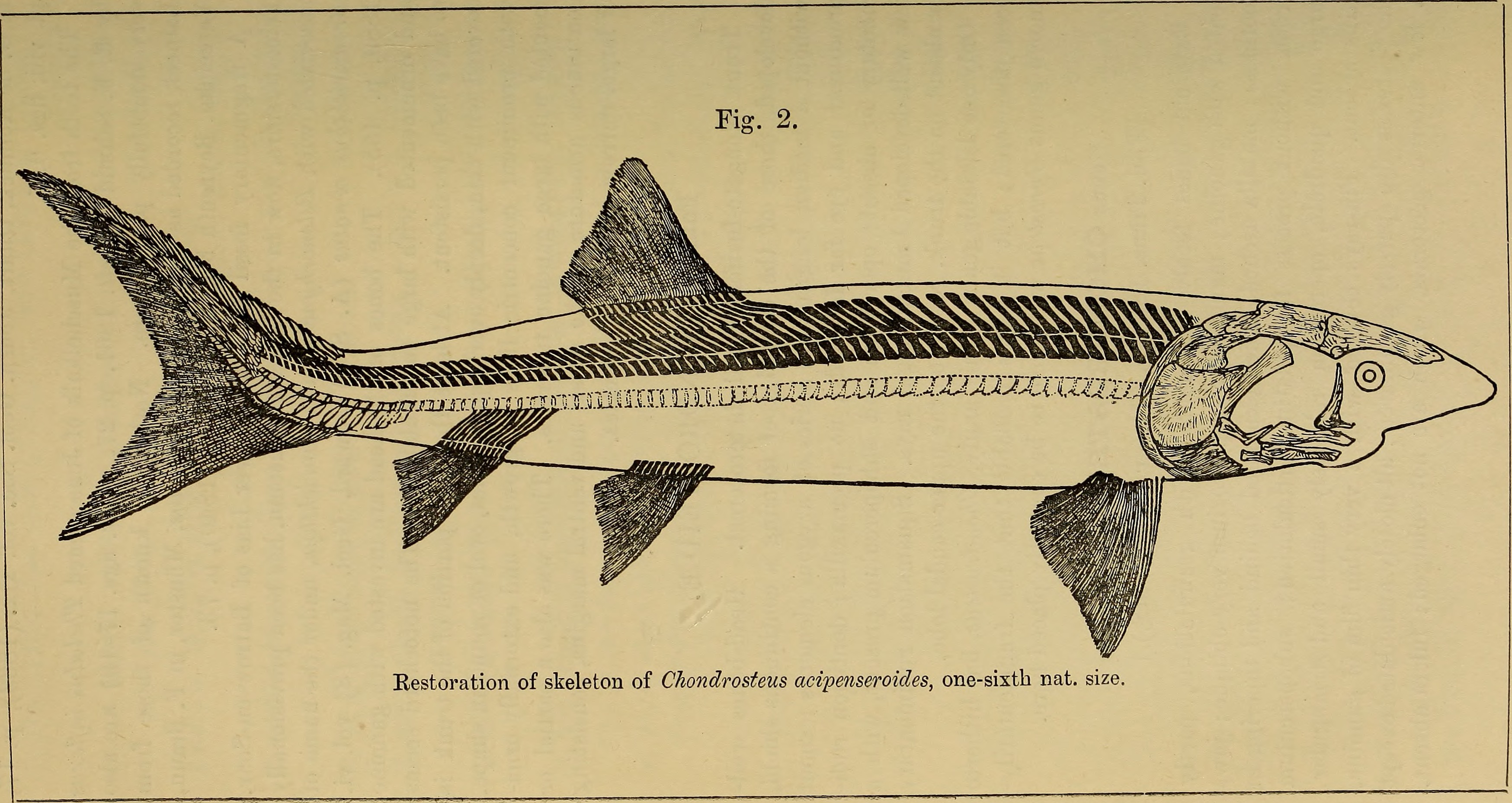
- Skeletal reconstruction of Chondrosteus

Scientific classification
- Kingdom: Animalia
- Phylum: Chordata
- Class: Actinopterygii
- Subclass: Chondrostei
- Order: †Chondrosteiformes; Aldinger, 1937
- Family: †Chondrosteidae; Egerton, 1858

Included genera
- †Chondrosteus Egerton, 1858 (ex Agassiz, 1834); †Gyrosteus Woodward, 1889 (ex Agassiz, 1834); †Strongylosteus Jaekel, 1931

= Chondrosteidae =

Chondrosteidae Temporal range: Sinemurian to Toarcian

Extinct family of fishes

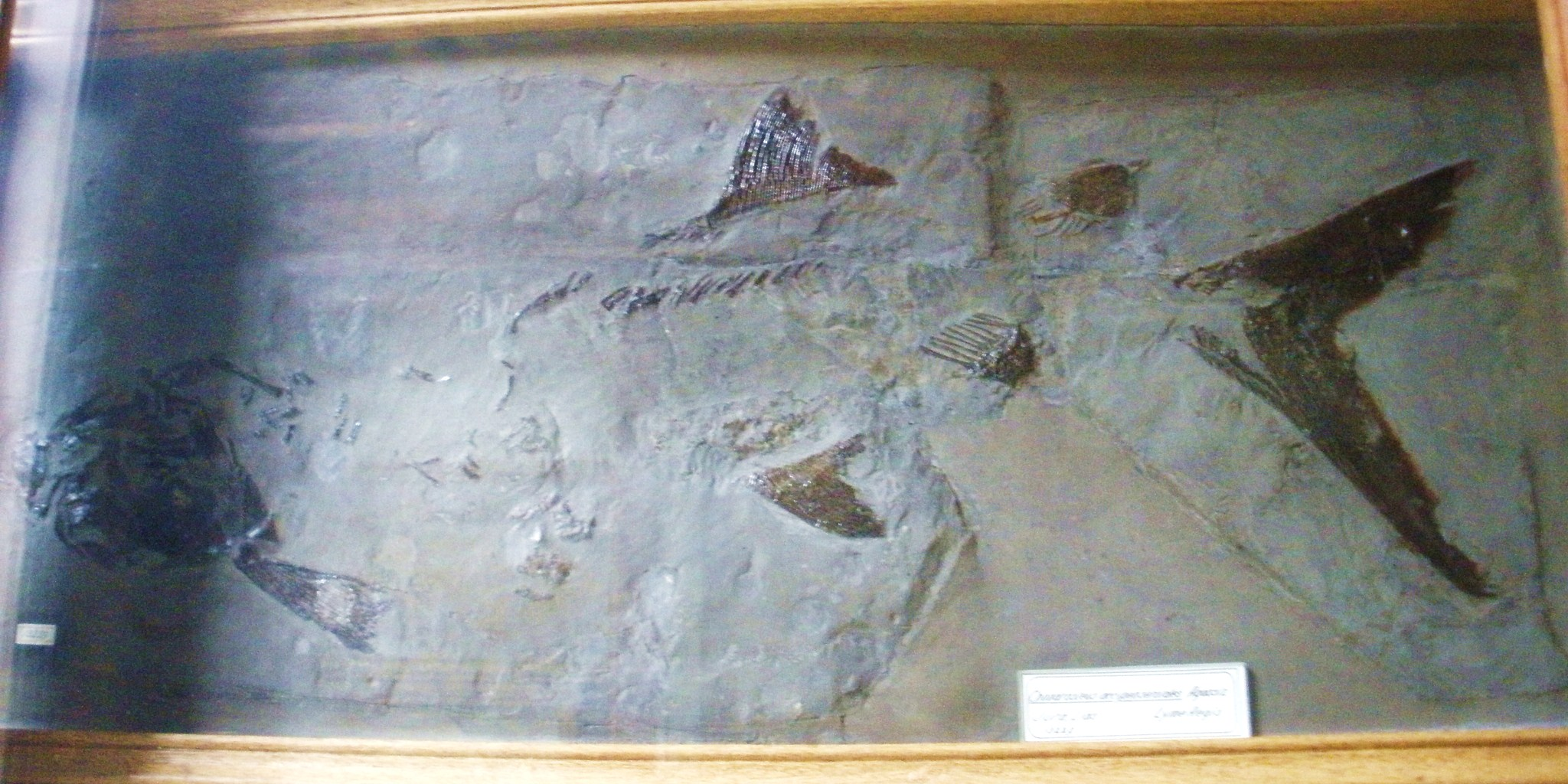
Fossil of Chondrosteus acipenseroides from Lyme Regis

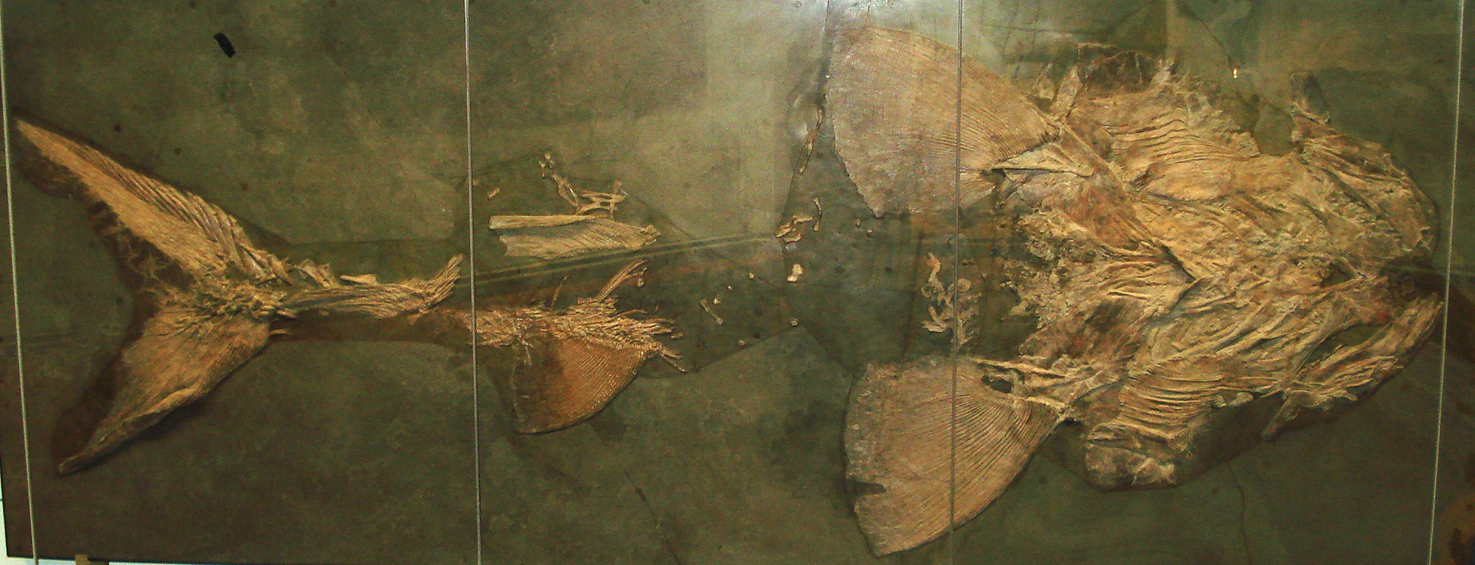
Strongylosteus hindenburgi fossil from Posidonia Shale, Staatliches Museum für Naturkunde Stuttgart

Chondrosteidae /ˌkɒndroʊstiˈaɪdiː/ is a family of extinct marine actinopterygian fishes, known from the Early Jurassic of Europe. They are closely related to modern sturgeons and paddlefish of the order Acipenseriformes, and are either placed as part of that order or the separate order Chondrosteiformes within the Chondrostei. Three genera are known, Chondrosteus, Gyrosteus, and Strongylosteus. Included species were of large size, with body lengths ranging from 2 metres (6.6 ft) up to 7 metres (23 ft). Their skeleton was largely made up of bones (unlike living chondrosteans), but ossification was reduced compared to other ray-fins.

== See also ==
- Prehistoric fish
- List of prehistoric bony fish
