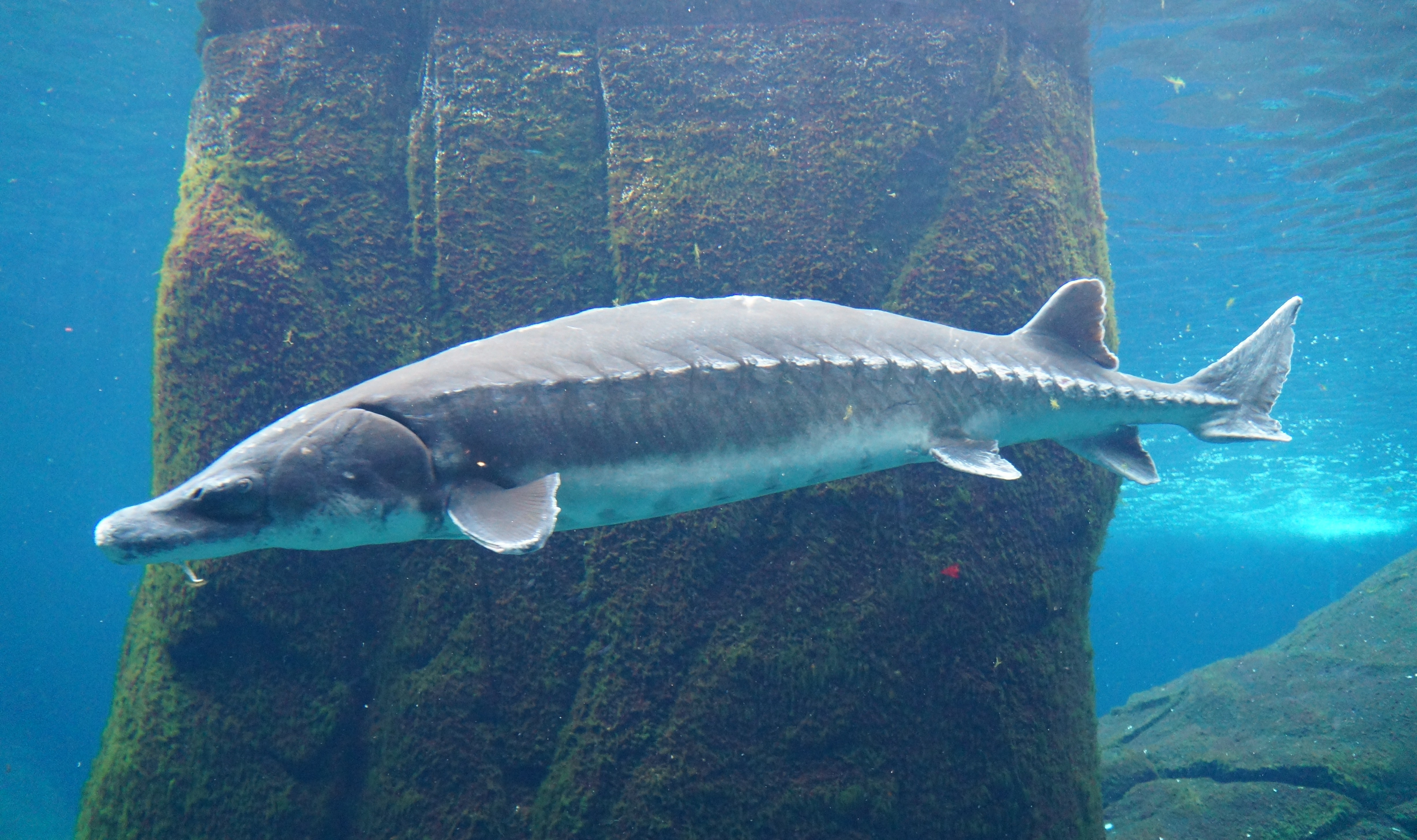
- In the Montreal Biodome

Conservation status
- Vulnerable (IUCN 3.1)

- Vulnerable (NatureServe)

Scientific classification
- Kingdom: Animalia
- Phylum: Chordata
- Class: Actinopterygii
- Order: Acipenseriformes
- Family: Acipenseridae
- Genus: Acipenser
- Species: A. oxyrinchus

Binomial name
- Acipenser oxyrinchus Mitchill, 1815

Synonyms
- Sturio accipenser Strøm 1784; Acipenser lichtensteinii Bloch & Schneider 1801; Acipenser (Antaceus) lecontei Duméril 1867; Acipenser (Antaceus) hallowellii Duméril 1870; Acipenser (Huso) kennicottii Duméril 1870; Acipenser (Huso) girardi Duméril 1870; Acipenser (Huso) macrorhinus Duméril 1870; Acipenser (Huso) bairdii Duméril 1870; Acipenser (Huso) holbrookii Duméril 1870; Accipenser ruthenus major Schöpf 1788; Acipenser (Huso) mitchillii Duméril 1870; Acipenser (Huso) storeri Duméril 1870; Acipenser oxyrhynchus (lapsus)

= Atlantic sturgeon =

Species of fish

The Atlantic sturgeon (Acipenser oxyrinchus) is a large species of sturgeon native to both sides of the Atlantic Ocean, and associated river basins. It is a member of the family Acipenseridae, and, along with other sturgeon, it is sometimes considered a living fossil. The main range of the Atlantic sturgeon is in eastern North America, extending from New Brunswick, Canada, to the eastern coast of Florida, United States. A highly endangered disjunct population occurs in the Baltic region of Europe (today only through a reintroduction project).

The Atlantic sturgeon was in great abundance when the first European settlers came to North America, but has since declined due to overfishing, water pollution, and habitat impediments such as dams. It is considered threatened, endangered, and even locally extirpated in many of its original habitats. The fish can reach 60 years of age, 15 ft (4.6 m) in length and over 800 lb (360 kg) in weight.

== Taxonomy ==
Alongside its relative the European sea sturgeon (A. sturio), the Atlantic sturgeon is one of the most basal members of the sturgeon lineage. The Gulf sturgeon (A. desotoi), endemic to Gulf of Mexico-draining rivers in the southeastern United States, was formerly considered a subspecies of the Atlantic sturgeon. However, phylogenetic studies suggest that both have sufficient genetic divergence to qualify as distinct species. The two species appear to have diverged during the Pleistocene.

=== Baltic population ===
The now nearly extinct sturgeon population in the Baltic Sea area belongs to the Atlantic sturgeon A. oxyrinchus rather than to the European species A. sturio as had been thought. A. oxyrinchus migrated to the Baltic about 1300 years ago and displaced the native A. sturio.

The last known specimen of the Atlantic sturgeon in the Baltic region was caught in 1996 near Muhumaa in Estonia. It was 2.9 m (9.5 ft) long, weighed 136 kg (300 lb), and was estimated to be about 50 years old.

== Physical appearance ==
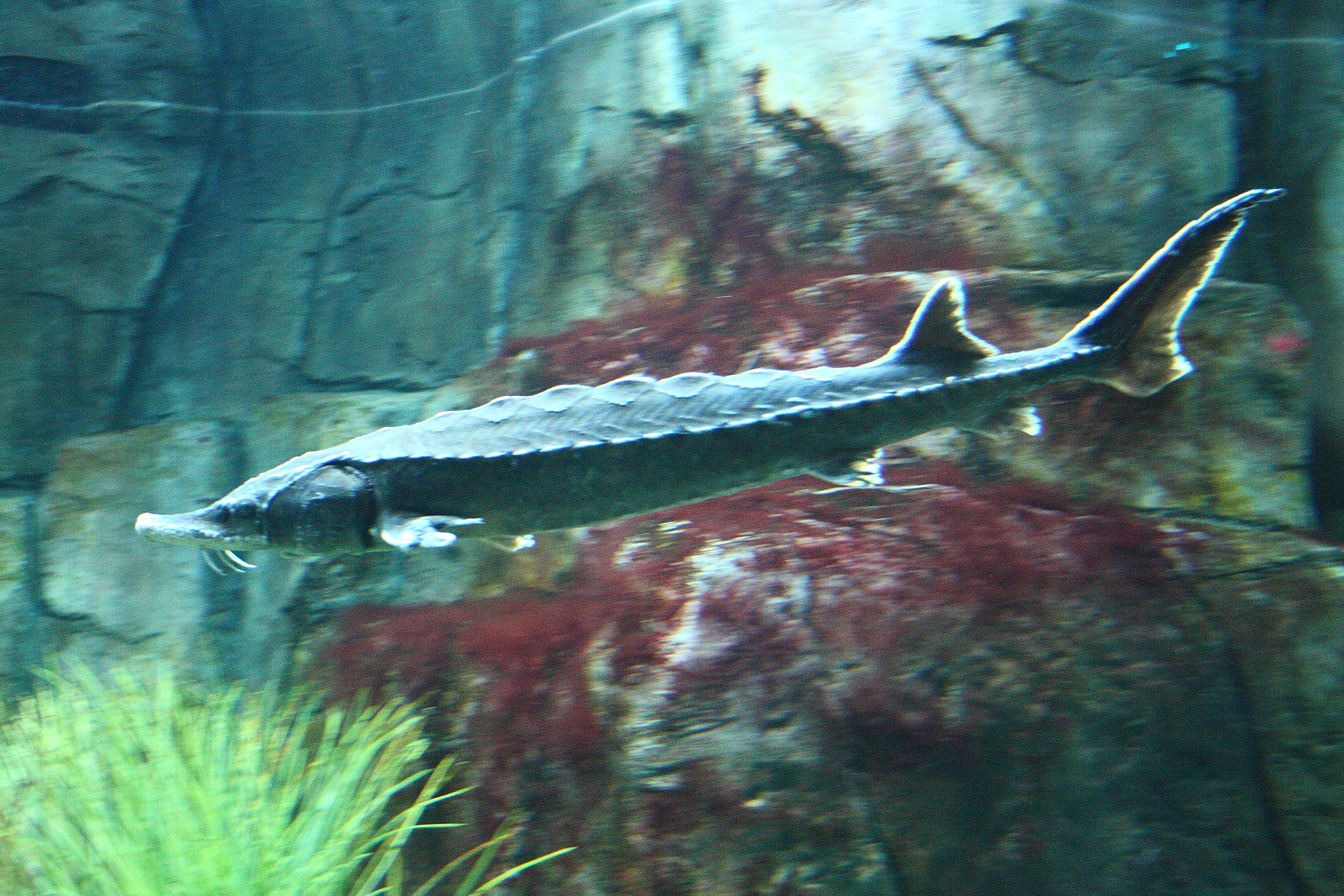
An Atlantic sturgeon at the Aquarium du Québec

Rather than having true scales, the Atlantic sturgeon has five rows of bony plates known as scutes. Specimens weighing over 800 lb and nearly 15 ft in length have been recorded, but they typically grow to be 6–8 ft (1.8–2.4 m) and no more than 300 lb (140 kg). Its coloration ranges from bluish-black and olive green on its back to white on its underside. It has a longer snout than other sturgeons and has four barbels at the side of its mouth.

== Behavior ==
Sturgeon are an anadromous species that live solitarily or in small groups. They migrate upriver in the spring to spawn. Sturgeons tend to inhabit the shallow waters of coastal shelves, coastal and estuarine areas on soft bottom in the sea, and can live down to a depth of 160 ft (49 m). Adults are migratory while at sea and will make long migrations to coastal areas, while juveniles will stay in fresh or brackish water until they are between two and five years of age. However, many larvae and juveniles do start to migrate and disperse small distances from their spawning sites.

Sturgeons are most generally known for feeding on crustaceans, worms, and molluscs.

Sturgeons may have dominance hierarchies with large fish being dominant when competing for limited foraging space.

== Life cycle ==
Atlantic sturgeon under six years of age stay in the brackish water where they were born before moving into the ocean. They may be 3–5 ft (0.91–1.52 m) long at this stage. In areas where shortnose sturgeon are also present, the adults of that species can be, and historically were for centuries, confused with immature Atlantic sturgeon. When mature, they travel upstream to spawn. The females may lay 800,000 to 3.75 million eggs in a single year, doing so every two to six years. After laying their eggs, females travel back downstream, but males may remain upstream after spawning until forced to return downstream by the increasingly cold water. They may even return to the ocean, where they stay near the coastline.

The species is also known for its occasional 'leaping' behavior, during which the fish will emerge completely out of the water in a forceful motion that can be hazardous to anything unlucky enough to be struck. The exact reason why sturgeon leap remains unknown, although some scholars believe leaping is a form of group communication.

== Threats ==
Sturgeons are widely distributed along the Atlantic coast of the United States. Their wide distribution and tendency to disperse has led to numerous subpopulations of sturgeon. This species is recorded to be Vulnerable and at risk of becoming an endangered species due to dam construction, dredging, dredge spoil disposal, groundwater extraction, irrigation, flow alterations, and other surface water withdrawals.

=== Harvest ===
Originally, the Atlantic sturgeon was considered a worthless fish. Its rough skin would often rip nets, keeping fishermen from catching more profitable fish. Sturgeon were one of the types of fish harvested at the first North American commercial fishery, and were the first cash "crop" harvested in Jamestown, Virginia. Other fisheries along the Atlantic coast harvested them for use as food, a leather material used in clothing and bookbinding, and isinglass, a gelatinous substance used in clarifying jellies, glues, wines and beer. However, the primary reason for catching sturgeon was the high-quality caviar that could be made cheaply from its eggs, called black gold by watermen. In the late 19th century, seven million pounds of sturgeon meat were exported from the US per year. Within years, however, that amount dropped to 22,000 pounds. The number later rose to about 200,000 pounds a year in the 1950s.

=== Susceptibility to anthropogenic disturbances ===
There are many wide-ranging subspecies along the Atlantic Coast of North America. Identification of distinct population segments (DPS) is problematic because of sturgeons' ability to disperse so widely. However, it is possible to do some characterization of genetic differentiation and estimate gene flow. This method has been used to determine possibility for listing under the U.S. Endangered Species Act.

The sturgeon's characteristics and life history make it susceptible to anthropogenic disturbances and make population restoration particularly difficult. They have late sexual maturity, only moderate fecundity, and spawn at low frequencies. Females spawn once every three to five years, and males every one to five years. This is due to their ability to live for an extremely long time (various sub-species can have a lifespan ranging from ten years to sixty years).

The population of Atlantic sturgeons has decreased dramatically due to overharvesting. The late 19th century saw a surge in demand for caviar, which led to overfishing of the Atlantic sturgeon. Today, only 22 out of its 38 original spawning rivers still have viable populations of the species. They are particularly susceptible to bycatch mortality due to the many fisheries that exist within their natal estuaries. Their habitat range, which usually includes coastal spawning sites and coastal migrations, makes sturgeon well within contact of coastal fisheries.

=== Effects of hypoxia ===
Hypoxia combined with high water temperatures in the summer has been shown to be consistent with decreased survival rates of young of the year sturgeon in Chesapeake Bay.

Hypoxia is defined as low ambient oxygen levels, which may be very harmful to organisms living in the hypoxic body of water. Often, lower regions of the water column will be more hypoxic than upper levels, closer to the surface. When surface access is denied, the situation is lethal to sturgeon. Increased incidences of summertime hypoxia have led, in part, to degradation of many sturgeon nursery habitats in the United States.

== Conservation status ==
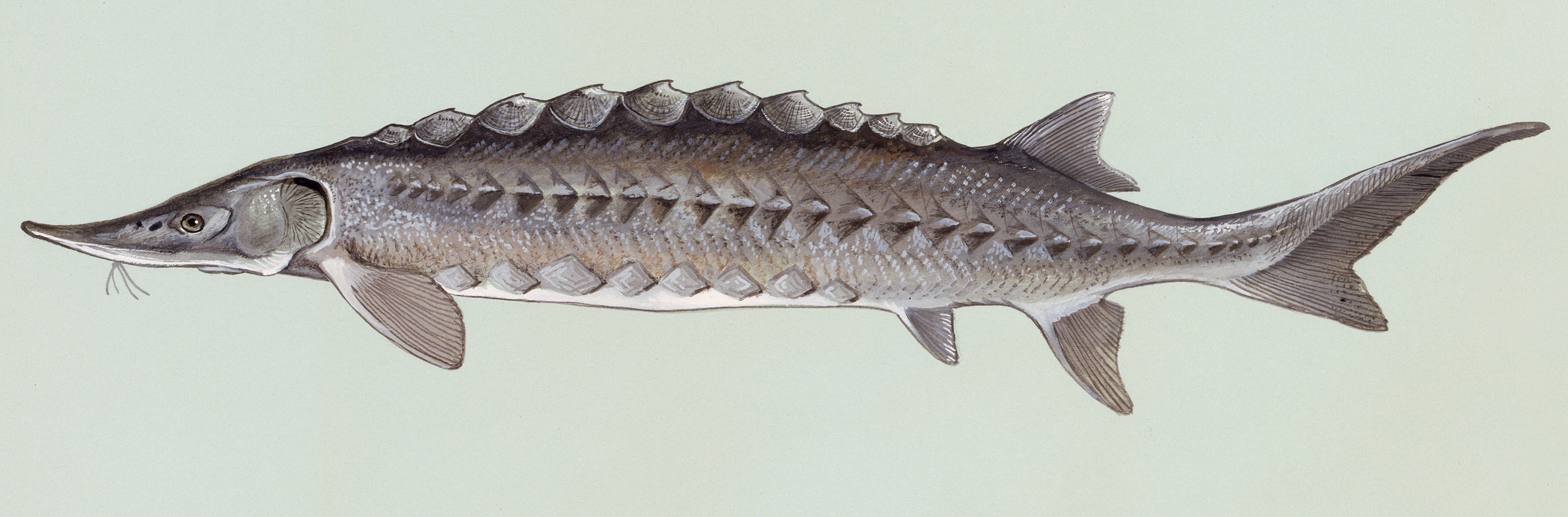
Illustration

In February 2012, the Atlantic sturgeon was listed by the National Oceanic and Atmospheric Administration Fisheries Service under the Endangered Species Act (ESA). Four distinct population segments (DPSs) were listed as endangered (New York Bight, Chesapeake Bay, Carolina, and South Atlantic) while one DPS was listed as threatened (Gulf of Maine). There are concerns that the construction of the bridge to replace the Tappan Zee connecting Rockland County to Westchester County in New York, in the Hudson River, may impact the sturgeon's ecological stability in the region.

The American Fisheries Society considers the fish as threatened throughout its entire range, although it is believed to no longer inhabit the full range it once did. In the Chesapeake watershed, the James River in Virginia is one of the last confirmed holdouts for that region's population. In May 2007, a survey captured 175 sturgeon in the river, with 15 specimens exceeding 5 ft (1.5 m). A bounty-based survey of live Atlantic sturgeon in Maryland's portion of the bay found a high number of captures reported in 2005–06.

In 2016, the National Marine Fisheries Service considered designating sixteen rivers as endangered habitat, which would require more attention to be given to uses of the rivers that affect the fish. Then in 2018, NMFS actually mapped a total of thirty-one critical river habitats along the United States' Atlantic shores.

Populations have declined dramatically over the last centuries, and even became extinct in Baltic range states in the later 20th century. Channelisation and barriers were part of the causes for declines affecting migration, along with pollution. Since 1996 Baltic sturgeon recovery has been attempted, with American donor populations used due to genetic similarities. Re-introduction with focus on returning these sturgeon to their native spawning grounds. NatureServe considers the species Vulnerable. A German-Polish project was underway in 2009 to reintroduce the sturgeon into the Baltic by releasing specimens caught in the Canadian Saint John River into the Oder, a river at the border between Germany and Poland where the species once spawned. The project expanded in 2013 to include Estonia, where one-year-old juveniles were released into the Narva River. The Baltic sturgeon population is considered Critically Endangered by the IUCN.

In 2012, the Atlantic sturgeon received protection under the Endangered Species Act.

=== Conservation designation ===
IUCN: Vulnerable

CITES: Appendix II

The American Fisheries Society considers it endangered in all stream systems except conservation-dependent in the Hudson, Delaware, and Altamaha Rivers.

The Atlantic sturgeon of the Delaware River are listed under the ESA as part of the New York Bight distinct population segment (DPS), which includes all Atlantic sturgeon that spawn in watersheds draining to coastal waters from Chatham, Massachusetts, to the Delaware-Maryland border on Fenwick Island, the Chesapeake Bay DPS, the Carolina DPS and the South Atlantic DPS, while the Gulf of Maine DPS is listed threatened. Canadian-origin populations are not currently listed under the U.S. ESA. NMFS believes fewer than 300 spawning adults are in the Delaware River population; just over 100 years ago the estimated population was 180,000 spawning adult females.

=== Management ===
Atlantic sturgeon are now a threatened species. Management of the species is largely based on the restriction of fishing of the species. This helps limit fishing mortalities of sturgeon to bycatch.
