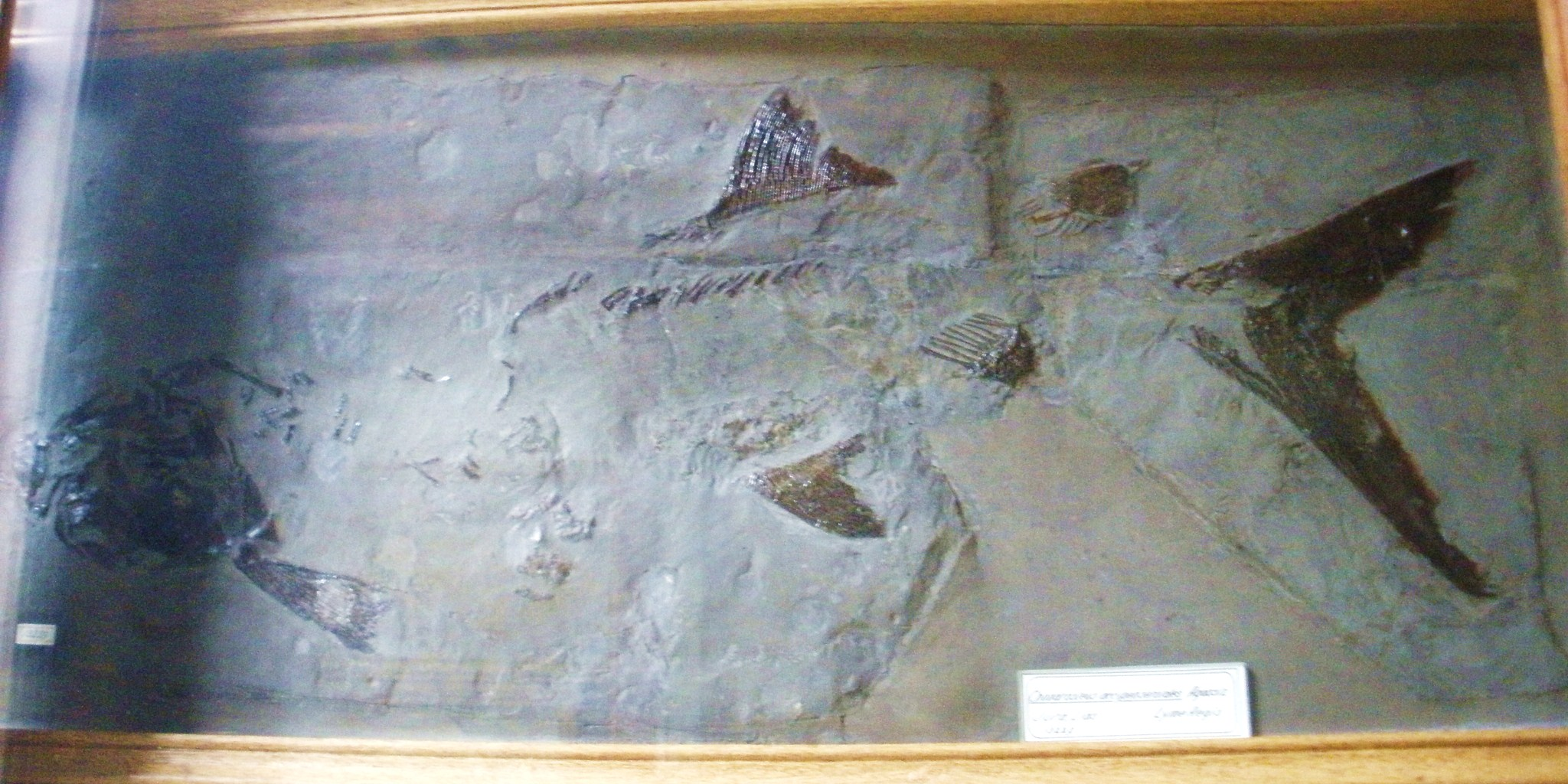
- Chondrosteus acipenseroides fossil from Teylers Museum, Haarlem

Scientific classification
- Kingdom: Animalia
- Phylum: Chordata
- Class: Actinopterygii
- Order: †Chondrosteiformes
- Family: †Chondrosteidae
- Genus: †Chondrosteus; Egerton, 1858 (ex Agassiz, 1834)
- Species: †C. acipenseroides

Binomial name
- †Chondrosteus acipenseroides Egerton, 1858 (ex Agassiz, 1834)

Synonyms
- †C. crassior Egerton, 1858; †C. pachyurus Egerton, 1858

= Chondrosteus =

Chondrosteus Temporal range: Hettangian to Sinemurian

Extinct genus of fishes

Chondrosteus ("cartilage bone" in Greek) is a genus of extinct marine actinopterygian (ray-finned fish) belonging to the family Chondrosteidae. It lived during the Hettangian and Sinemurian (early Early Jurassic) in what is now England. Chondrosteus is related to sturgeons and paddlefishes as part of the clade Acipenseriformes, and is one of the earliest known definitive members of the group. Similar to sturgeons, the jaws of Chondrosteus were free from the rest of the skull (projectile jaw system). Its scale cover was reduced to the upper lobe of the caudal fin like in paddlefish. It is represented by a single species, C. acipenseroides.

== History and naming ==
The first mention of material that would be assigned to Chondrosteus was in the last paragraph of "Recherches sur les Poisson Fossiles", a paper written by Louis Agassiz in 1884. The specimen (UMO J.3064) was made up of a portion of the caudal skeleton found at Lyme Regis and was named Chondrosteus acipenseroides based on similarities in the shape of the caudal fin. The genus would not be mentioned again until 1858 when Sir Philipde Malpas Grey Egerton would comment that Agassiz had not given a proper description of the material with him describing other specimens attributed to the genus since the original naming. Along with the description of the material, Egerton would also name two new species being C. pachyurus and C. crassior. After this publication, a number of papers were published describing the anatomy of Chondrosteus with the latest one being by Woodward in 1895. One of these papers, by Davis in 1887, argued the validity of C. crassior due to the presence of ossifications that are more likely indicative of an ontogenically based change rather than a difference between species. Though Traquair was critical of the paper by Davis, Woodward would agree with the synonymy of the two species in 1895 though suggested that C. pachyurus was still its own species. It wouldn't be until 2009 that Eric J. Hilton and Peter L. Forey would publish a redescription of the type species. During the redescription, they also looked at the only specimen of C. pachyurus concluding that it was also synonymous with the type species. This paper not only was the first redescription of the material but also agrees with previous ideas that the family Chondrosteidae is sister to all other Acipenseriformes.

The genus name "Chondrosteus" derives from the Greek "chondros" and Latin "bony" with the name coming from the original belief that the genus was a transitional form between cartilaginous and bony fish. The species name "acipenseroides" derives from its similarities in caudal fin morphology to Acipenser.

=== Synonymy with other Genera ===
Throughout the last one hundred years, multiple closely-related genera have been thought to be synonymous with Chondrosteus. The first of these is Strongylosteus, a fish described by Pompeckj in 1914. Another relative, Gyrosteus, had also been considered a subjective synonym of Chondrosteus in papers such as Bemis et al. (1997). It wouldn't be until 2025 that the differences in the skull roof anatomy of the genera would be properly described including the presence of two bones not present in the skull roof of Chondrosteus being the medial parietal and rostral bones.

== Description ==
=== Skull ===
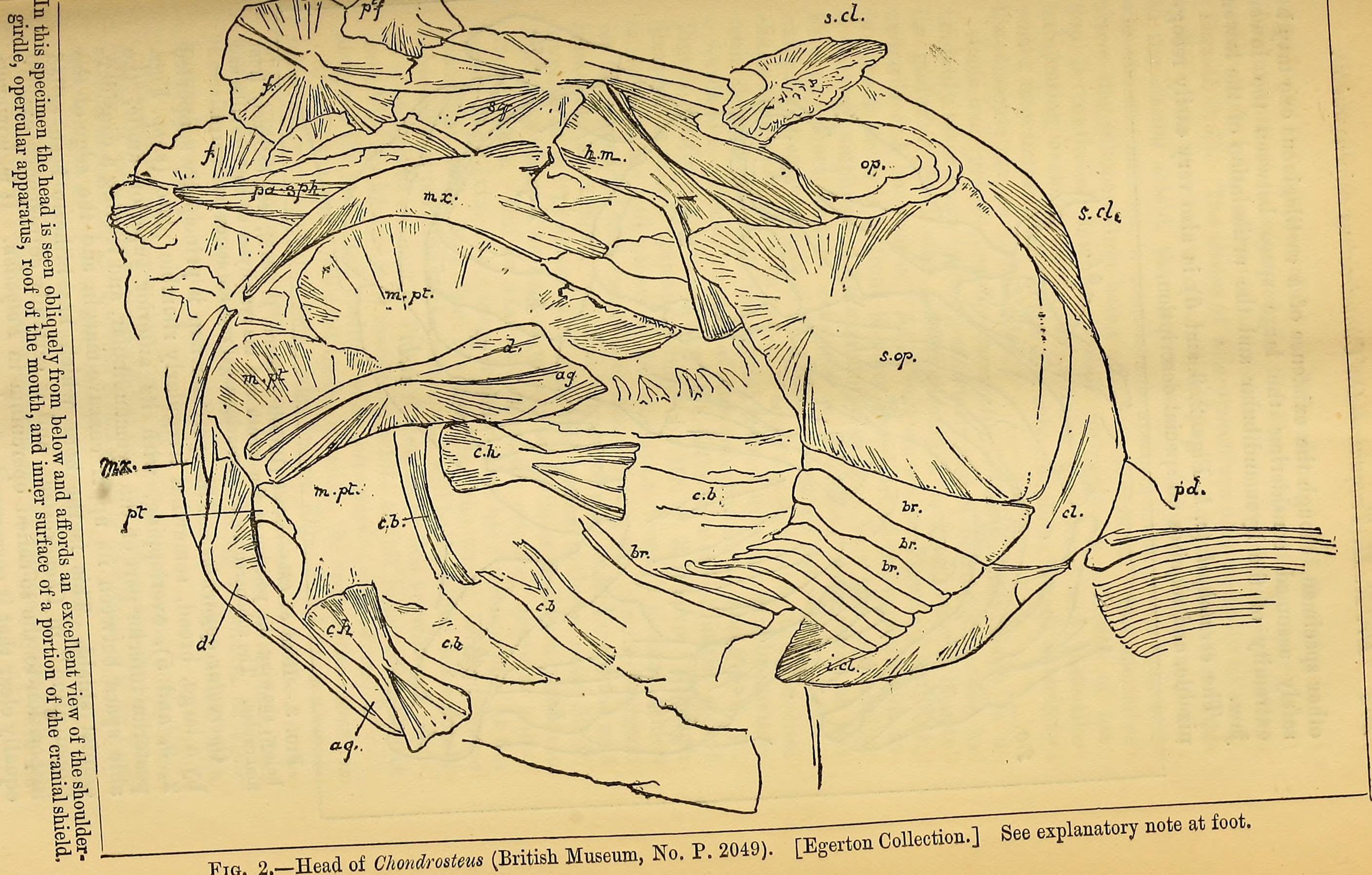
An illustration of skull material of the Chondrosteus acipenseroides

The skull roof of Chondrosteus was highly ornamented with this ornamentation ranging from a large amount of denticles which make the surface of the bone look like course sandpaper to a texture described as an "irregular honeycomb". This ornamentation is the heaviest on the sides and back of the skull roof along with the back of the opercular bones and the sides of the pectoral girdle. Though the skull roof is usually poorly preserved in specimens, the frontal, dermopterotic, and parietal bones largely make up the skull roof with the dermopterotic bones being the largest. The parietal and dermopterotic bones make contact with the frontals towards their front and the extrascapular series towards the back. Unlike in living acipenserids, Chondrosteus lacked dorsal postorbitals with the dermosphenotic being in direct contact with the L-shaped jugals. The snout region of specimens is usually poorly preserved, due to this, the bones that would have been in front of the frontals have not been preserved in any specimen. There are rostral canal bones present in front of the jugal bone which are flatter than what is seen in other acipenseriforms. Also unlike other acipenseriforms, the eye of Chondrosteus would have been completely surrounded by four sclerotic bones with a few other members only having isolated ossifications near the eye.

The jaws of Chondrosteus lacked teeth with the upper jaw largely being made up of the palatopterygoid with there being no evidence of the quadrate and autopalatine seen in living acipenseriforms. The lower jaw is largely made up of the edentulous dentary with the whole jaw being robust. Though there are no teeth present, there is a groove on the sides of the dentary which was potentially where the mandibular sensory canal was housed. Gill rakers are preserved in the specimen with a number of small teeth. The only other presence of teeth specimens being on toothplates which are found in association with the ceratobranchials and epibranchial. The exact position of these tooth plates in life is unknown.

=== Postcranium ===
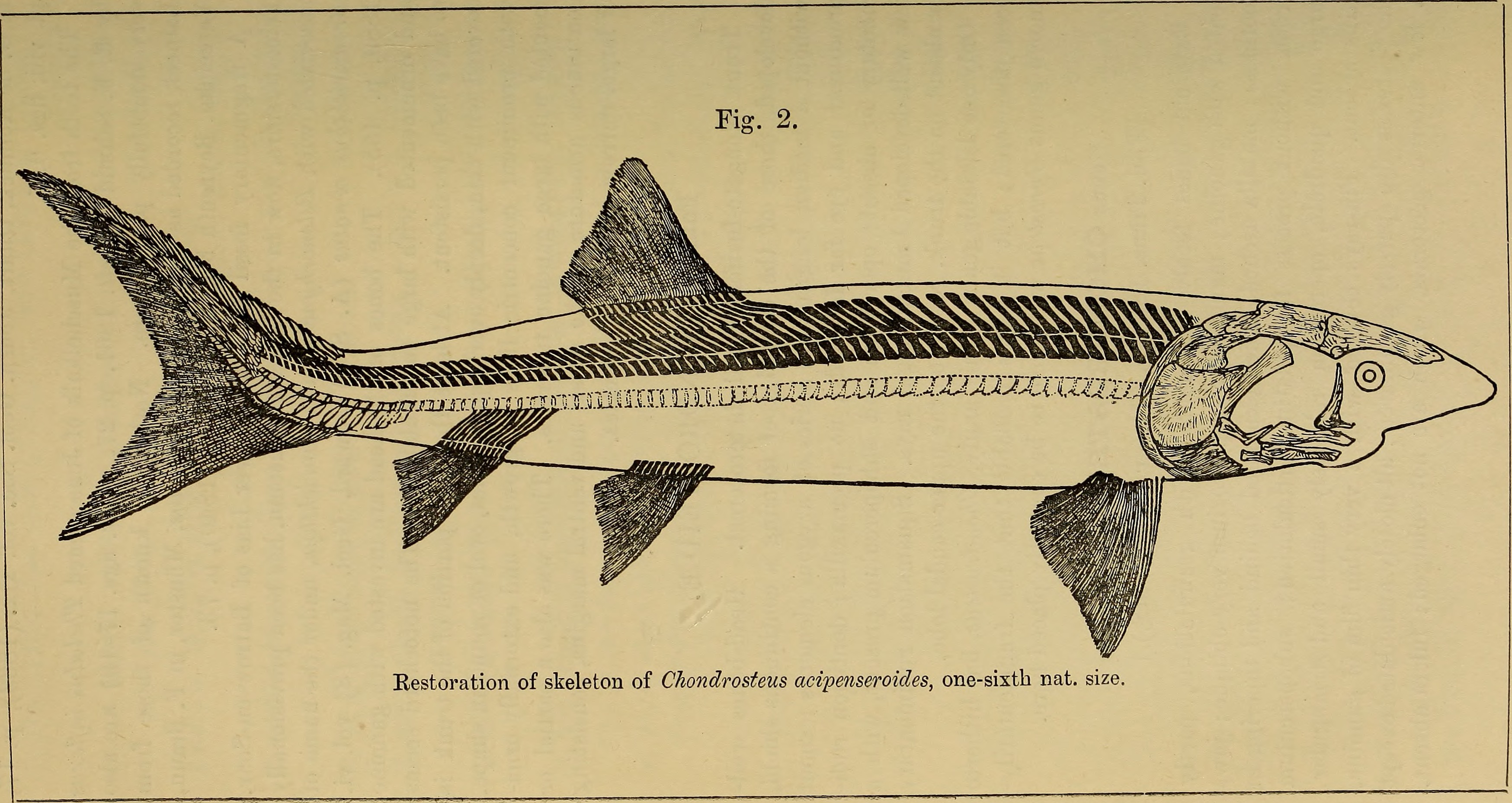
Restoration of Chondrosteus acipenseroides

Chondrosteus was a large fish with the largest measured specimen having a total length of around 1,100 millimetres (43 in) though specimens once attributed to C. pachyurus are much larger. Outside of a single specimen (BMNHP.3366), the only preserved parts of the vertebrae are the neural arch and supraneural series. On the other specimen haemal elements near the anal fins and neural arches are preserved over the entire length of the fish with the largest being preserved near the dorsal fin. The pectoral girdle is preserved in multiple specimens though they lack the interclavicle, this being most likely due to the preservation of the specimens. Though it is similar to the pectoral girdles of other acipenseriforms, the postcleithrum of Chondrosteus was triangular rather than stick-like. The pectoral fins of the fish are triangular and made up of 59 fins rays with a small fin spine right in front of them. The pelvic region of Chondrosteus is poorly preserved with the fish lacking an ossified pelvic bone, similar to living acipenseriforms. The pelvic and dorsal fins of the fish are located nearly parallel to one another with the base of the dorsal fin being slightly further up than the pelvic fins. The dorsal fin is triangular though concave in the back and has a long base with it being around the length of the longest dorsal fin length. The anal fin is much further back than the dorsal fin and has a more narrow base, being around 70% of the length of the dorsal fin base. This fin forms a caudal peduncle, being very close to the lower lobe of the caudal fin. The caudal fin is overall similar to other acipenseriforms with the upper and lower lobes being around the same length. Like sturgeon and more basal ray-finned fish, this fin's dorsal margin processes fulcra.

The body of Chondrosteus was mostly scaleless though the pectoral girdle does share similar ornamentation to the skull. Though not well preserved, the lepidotrichia of the fins could have also been ornamented with spiny tubercules similar to relatives. Like other acipenseriforms, the upper lobe of the caudal fin would have processed a set of rhombic scales.

== Classification ==
Since the original description of the genus, the relationship between it and sturgeon was noticed by multiple authors with authors like Traquair calling it an "Acipenseroid" fish. He would place the family containing Chondrosteus into Ganiods with it being closely related to "Spatularidae" and Palaeoniscidae.

In the most recent analysis of the genus by Hilton & Forey (2009), the placement of Chondrosteus within Acipenseriformes was tested based on both living and extinct members of the order. Based on a number of features, the fish was found to be sister to all other members of the group. This separation was due to differences in the anatomy and composition of the gills that are most similar to earlier groups of ray-finned fish. Along with this, Chondrosteus lacks the rounded scales near the pectoral girdle that is seen in the modern members and Peipiaosteus.
