= Gyrosteus =

Gyrosteus Temporal range: Lower Toarcian 184–181 Ma Possible Bathonian record

Scientific classification
- Kingdom: Animalia
- Phylum: Chordata
- Class: Actinopterygii
- Order: †Chondrosteiformes
- Family: †Chondrosteidae
- Genus: †Gyrosteus; Agassiz, 1843

Type species
- †Gyrosteus mirabilis Agassiz, 1844

Species
- †"Gyrosteus" subdeltoideus

Extinct genus of fishes

Gyrosteus is an extinct genus of large marine ray-finned fish belonging to the family Chondrosteidae. It comprises the type species, Gyrosteus mirabilis, which lived during the early Toarcian (Late Early Jurassic) in what is now northern Europe. A possible second species, "Gyrosteus" subdeltoideus, is known from otoliths.

== Discovery and naming ==
While seeing fossil collections of the Earl of Enniskillen and Philip Grey Egerton, Louis Agassiz identified fragments of a giant fish (praised by him then as "marine giant") from the Yorkshire Lias in the 1830s, referring them to Coelacanths and naming it "Gyrosteus" without any referred species in 1834, back then a nomen nudum, as he never described or illustrated the materials. His bankruptcy halted the formal description process, with the species only properly named in 1840. Egerton mentioned "Gyrosteus mirabilis" earlier (1837) but did not describe it, leaving Agassiz as the credited author. Simpson misattributed a fragment as a cephalopod in 1855. Arthur Smith Woodward thoroughly described Gyrosteus mirabilis in 1889–90, distinguishing it from Chondrosteus based on dermal bone patterns and branchial structure. A partial skull roof was noted but its elements remained poorly understood, with significant material loss due to pyrite decay.

Fossil remains of G. mirabilis have been recovered from the Earliest Toarcian (maybe the Harpoceras serpentinum biozone) of the Whitby Mudstone Formation, United Kingdom, and from Ahrensburg erratics assemblage in Schleswig-Holstein (maybe part of the Grimmen Formation), northern Germany. Gyrosteus was thought to be exclusive of the “British faunal province” and separated from the “Germanic faunal province” until the discovery of a hyomandibula in the baltic realm, mostly populated by Germanic fauna, which possibly implicates that Baltic region represented an interdigitating zone between both regions.

The name Gyrosteus was coined supposely based on the twisted shape of the hyomandibula.

== Description ==
The members of the genus Gyrosteus were massive fishes, with a maximum calculated standard length of 6 metres (20 ft) to 7 metres (23 ft), and with a reported hyomandibula reaching 50 centimetres (20 in). Its known remains included the jaws, palate, operculum, parasphenoid, branchial skeleton, pectoral girdle, pectoral fin, vertebral fragments, and parts of the caudal fin. The dermal bone texture featured tubercles arranged along radiating growth lines.

=== Skull Roof ===
SMNS 97274, a skull roof referred Gyrosteus mirabilis preserved in a mudstone slab, records most of the rostral bones in a mosaic arrangement, similar to other chondrosteid fishes, with some sections mostly absent due to damage. The lateral parietals are robust, with serrated edges and ridged ornamentation radiating from the center, while the medial parietal is poorly preserved and semi-circular. The postparietals are rectangular, heavily ornamented with tubercles and ridges, and asymmetrically fused at the midline. The dermosphenotic is pentagonal with faint ridging, while the dermopterotics are flat, rectangular, and share a similar ornamentation to the postparietals. Four extrascapular bones, with minimal tubercles and faint ridges, line the posterior edge of the skull roof. The posttemporals are fragmented, showing a bifurcated structure that aligns with those seen in related species.

This new skull roof corroborated that the coeval Strongylosteus was a distinct based on differences such as the number of rostral bones, the presence of a medial parietal, and variations in bone proportions and ornamentation patterns. The morphological distinctions are consistent across specimens, ruling out ontogenetic or intraspecific variation. Authors also pointed out that a modern redescription and phylogenetic analysis of both Strongylosteus and Gyrosteus is still necessary to clarify their evolutionary relationships within Chondrosteidae.
