= Tanis (disambiguation) =

Tanis is an archaeological site in Egypt, and the location of a city of the same name.

Tanis may also refer to:

== Places ==
- Tanis, Manche, France
- Tanis, Wiltshire, England
- Tanis (fossil site), in North Dakota, U.S.

== People ==
- Tanis (musician) (Tanis Chalopin, born 1993), French-Singaporean singer-songwriter
- Tanis (given name), including a list of people with the name
- Farah Tanis (fl. from 1993), American feminist activist
- James Tanis (born 1965), Papua New Guinean politician
- Fırat Tanış (born 1975), Turkish actor
- Umut Taniş (born 2004), Turkish footballer

== Fictional entities ==
- Tanis Half-Elven, a character in the Dragonlance novels
- Tanis, a character in "Cold Fire" (Star Trek: Voyager)
- Tanis, a character in Scooby-Doo and the Ghoul School
- Tanis, a planet in Pandorum
- Tanis, a character in Letterkenny
- Andreas Tanis, a character in Underworld: Evolution
- Professor Tanis, a character in Better Call Saul

== Other uses ==
- Tanis (podcast), a mystery horror podcast
- Bishop of Tanis

== See also ==
- Tanish, an Indian actor
