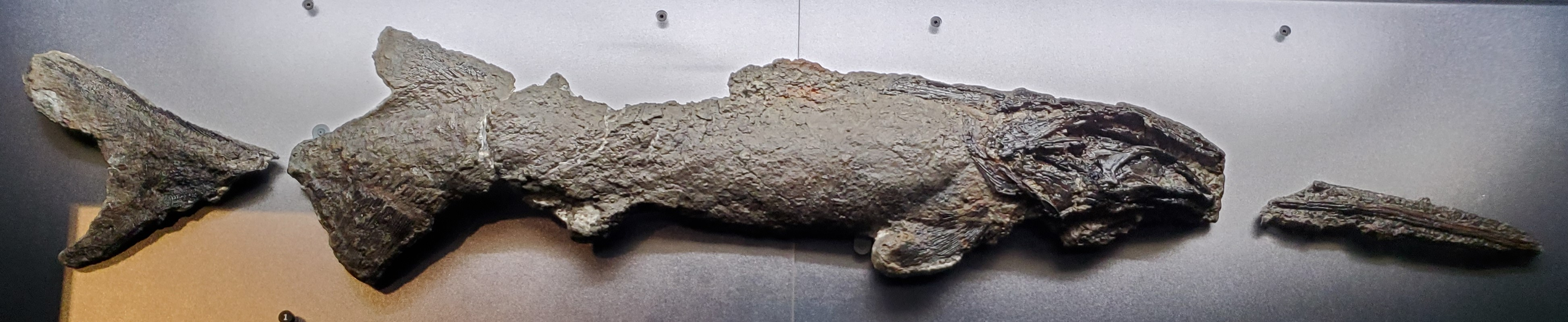
- Cast of the holotype, Liberty Science Center.
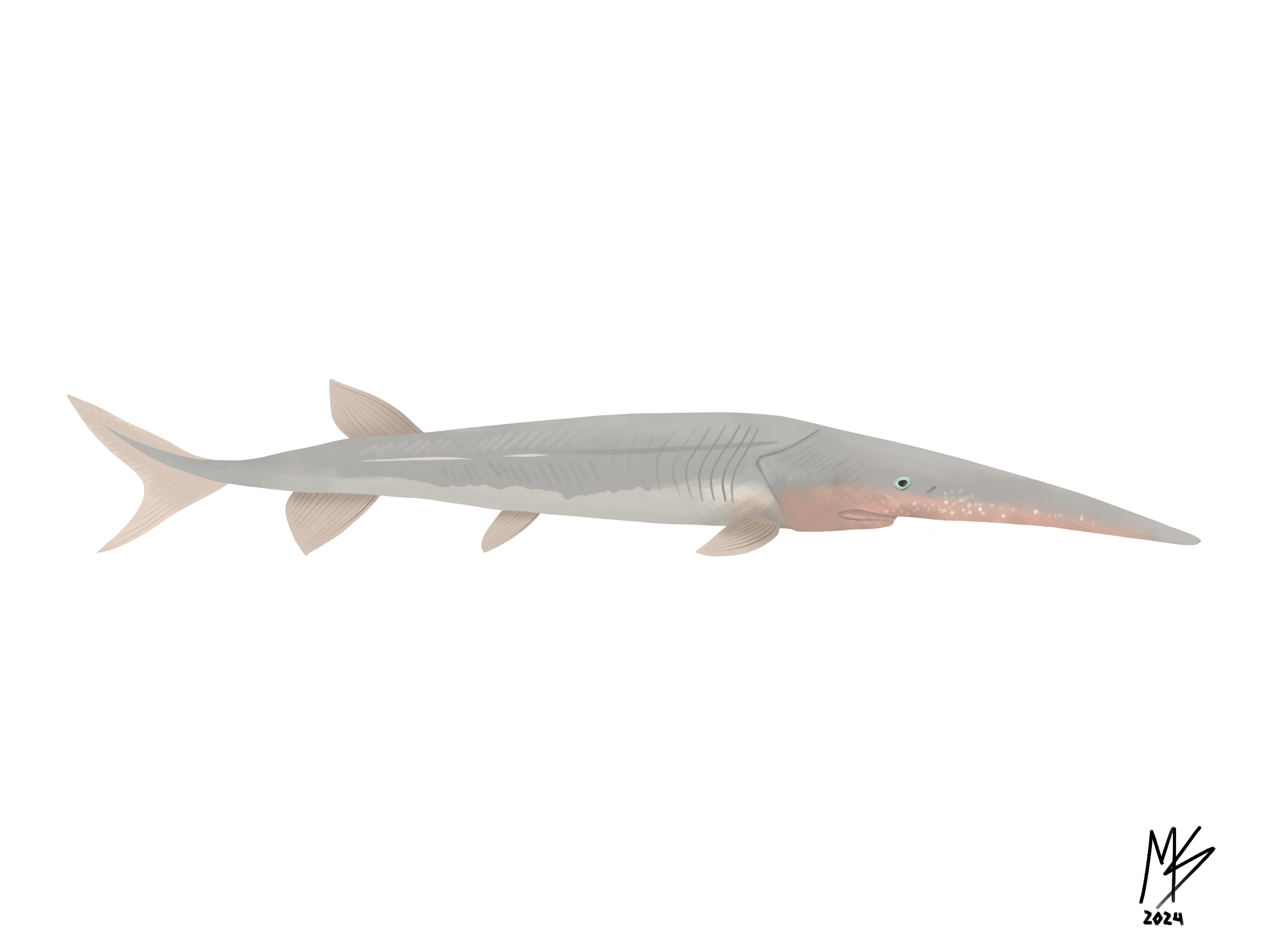
- Life restoration

Scientific classification
- Kingdom: Animalia
- Phylum: Chordata
- Class: Actinopterygii
- Order: Acipenseriformes
- Family: Polyodontidae
- Genus: †Parapsephurus; Hilton et al., 2023

Type species
- Parapsephurus willybemisi Hilton et al., 2023

= Parapsephurus =

Parapsephurus Temporal range: Maastrichtian

Extinct genus of fishes

Parapsephurus is an extinct genus of paddlefish in the family Polyodontidae. Currently the only known species in this genus is the type species, Parapsephurus willybemisi. P. willybemisi is known a nearly complete specimen from the Tanis locality of the Hell Creek Formation in North Dakota, USA, which dates to the late Maastrichtian stage of the Late Cretaceous, approximately 66 million years ago.

Size of Parapsephurus (green, bottom centre) compared to other paddlefish

The name Parapsephurus refers to the similarities between the short gill arches of this genus and the more recently extinct paddlefish Psephurus, also known as the Chinese paddlefish. The type species, P. willybemisi, is named in honor of William E. Bemis, a professor of ecology and evolutionary biology and curator of fishes at Cornell University, who has conducted extensive research on paddlefish.

The rostrum of the holotype specimen is around 35 centimetres (14 in) in length, with a total body length of around 160.5 centimetres (5.27 ft). The species is placed in the clade Polyodonti, which includes all polyodontids other than the most primitive genus Protopsephurus. Like Psephurus and other extinct paddlefish genera, the genus was likely piscivorous, feeding on fish, rather than planktivorous like Polyodon.
