= Tanis (given name) =

Tanis is a feminine given name. Notable people with the name include:

- Tanis (musician) (Tanis Chalopin, born 1993), French-Singaporean singer-songwriter
- Tanis Chandler (born 1924), American film actress
- Tanis MacDonald, Canadian poet and literature professor
- Tanis Rideout, Canadian poet, journalist and novelist
- Tanis S'eiltin (born 1951), American Tlingit artist

== See also ==
- James Tanis (born 1965), Papua New Guinean politician
- Tanis (disambiguation)
