= Dawne =

Dawne is a name. It can be a feminine given name, a middle name, or a surname. Notable people with this name include:

== As a given name ==
- Dawne Deskins (fl. 1984–present), an American major general
- Dawne Hickton (born 1957), an American businesswoman
- Dawne McCance (born 1944), a Canadian religion scholar
- Dawne Shand (born 1969/1970), an American state politician from Massachusetts

== As a middle name or surname ==
- Mary Dawne Arden (1933 – 2014), an American actress
- E. J. Dawne (c. 1844 – disappeared 1885), an American preacher and judge
