= Dinosaurs: The Final Day with David Attenborough =

BBC television documentary

- Directed by: Matthew Thompson
- Starring: David Attenborough
- Narrated by: David Attenborough
- Country of origin: United Kingdom
- Original language: English

Production
- Executive producer: Helen Thomas
- Running time: 90 minutes
- Production company: BBC Studios Science Unit

Original release
- Network: BBC One
- Release: 15 April 2022

Dinosaurs: The Final Day with David Attenborough (titled Dinosaur Apocalypse in the U.S.) is a British documentary programme that aired on BBC One on 15 April 2022. Presented by David Attenborough, the documentary follows the final days of dinosaurs through the Cretaceous–Paleogene extinction event.

The programme's creatures were made with computer-generated imagery.

In the United States, the documentary aired in a two-episode format for the PBS series NOVA - under the title Dinosaur Apocalypse - on 11 May 2022.

== Synopsis ==
Using the Tanis fossil site in the Hell Creek Formation as evidence, Attenborough and paleontologists try to piece together the extinction of the dinosaurs and the asteroid believed to have killed them, 65.5 million years ago. At this site in North Dakota, numerous groundbreaking fossil discoveries that reveal information on the final years of the Cretaceous period and the organisms that were present during the time have been made.

Years before the final day of the dinosaurs, gravitational interactions with Jupiter dislodge the asteroid which will become the Chicxulub impactor from its orbit, sending it on a course for Earth.

On a spring morning, 65.5 million years ago, Tanis was a sandbank on the edge of a river near the Western Interior Seaway. Huge Azhdarchid pterosaurs congregate en masse to nest and raise their young, which are born fully capable of flight. A mother Tyrannosaurus rex tends to her eggs, and two Triceratops spar over territory in the woods just beyond the water's edge. Meanwhile, the river itself is full of a host of aquatic and semi-aquatic organisms, including baenid turtles, sturgeons, paddlefish and bowfins. Also native to the area is the neornithischian dinosaur Thescelosaurus, which is speculated to have used the water as an advantage to escape bigger predators. Pediomys, a genus of early marsupial mammal, thrives at Tanis, though they spend much of their time burrowing and rushing through the undergrowth to avoid the other animals that make the sandbank their home.

Following the discovery of fossilised fish with tektite spherules embedded in their gill arches, insight into what destroyed the ecosystem at Tanis is made; the culprit, believed to be a seiche wave produced by seismic waves from the impact, must have arrived at Tanis while the spherules were still falling from the sky, up to two hours after the impact. A specimen of amber is found that contains an intact piece of tektite as an inclusion; analysis of the amber using the Diamond Light Source synchrotron in Oxfordshire yields the remarkable discovery of the spherule containing a piece of unmelted rock with quantities of metals that are consistent with the asteroid itself. With a seiche wave now believed to be responsible, a complete image of Tanis's final moments can be reconstructed.

Immediately after the asteroid struck the Yucatan Peninsula, life continued at Tanis as normal for several minutes. The blast generated by the impact would have been visible, but silent, as its shock wave dissipated a long distance away from Tanis. The effects of the impact arrived in the form of an onslaught of seismic waves and the rain of spherules that set the surrounding vegetation on fire. Shortly after this, a ten-metre high seiche is sent up the Interior Seaway, swiftly wiping out the area's ecosystem and preserving many different species beneath a layer of sediment that would eventually be unearthed by researchers as fossils in the present day. Two such fossils are discovered that give particular insight into Tanis's fate; a Thescelosaurus fossil is found with its skeleton in a jumbled state, suggesting it was killed by being thrown about by turbulent water, and a fossil of a turtle shows signs of the animal being impaled by airborne or waterborne debris. In the case of the Thescelosaurus specimen, it may represent the first confirmed fossilised dinosaur that was killed as a direct result of the impact and its immediate aftereffects, rather than one that had died some time before or after the disaster.

In the hours that follow, heat given off by the impact ignites fires across the globe. Only the hardiest and most fortunate animals and plants can survive the relentless flames and smoke that enshroud the planet, giving rise to a nuclear winter; for small animals, one of the best methods to escape the horrendous aftereffects of the impact was to build burrows. As the dust settles, the impactor leaves additional evidence of its extraterrestrial origin in the form of a layer of iridium - a metal rare in Earth's crust, but common in asteroids - across the globe, in the form of the Cretaceous–Paleogene boundary. With the start of the Paleogene, mammals, reptiles - including lizards, snakes, turtles and crocodiles and their relatives, among others - and birds inherit the planet, beginning the age of mammals that persists to the present day. In the case of the birds, they persist as a surviving lineage of the theropod dinosaurs; thus, it is more correct to say that the Cretaceous extinction event brought about an end to all dinosaur]]s, but not dinosaurs as a whole.

== Reception ==
Chitra Ramaswamy of The Guardian rated the documentary four out of five stars.

== See also ==
- List of films featuring dinosaurs
