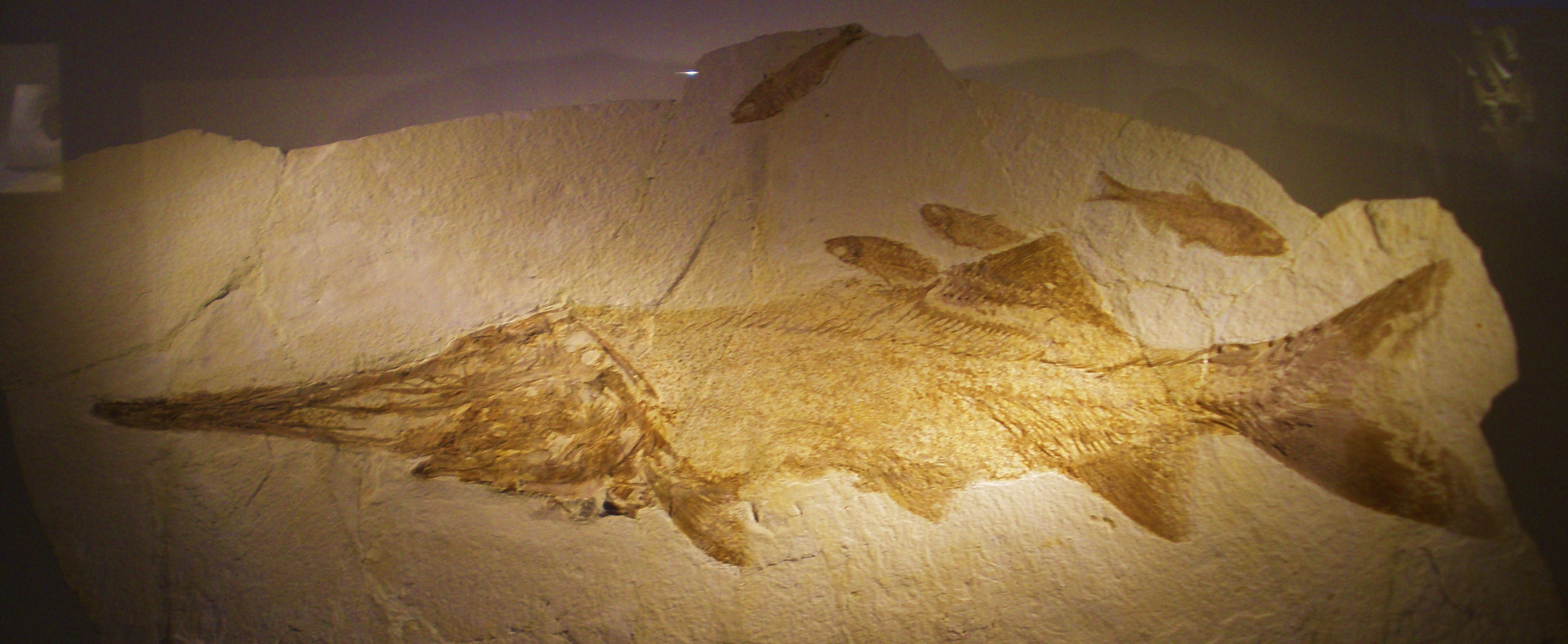
- Crossopholis magnicaudatus

Scientific classification
- Kingdom: Animalia
- Phylum: Chordata
- Class: Actinopterygii
- Order: Acipenseriformes
- Family: Polyodontidae
- Genus: †Crossopholis; Cope, 1883

Type species
- Crossopholis magnicaudatus Cope, 1883

= Crossopholis =

Crossopholis Temporal range: Ypresian

Extinct genus of fishes

Crossopholis is an extinct paddlefish known from the early Eocene (Ypresian) of North America, approximately 52 million years ago. It is a close relative of the contemporary American paddlefish, though it is thought to have been a fish-eater like the Chinese paddlefish rather than a filter feeder.

== History of discovery ==
First described by Edward Drinker Cope in 1883, the first specimen consisted of an incomplete section of the fish's body and tail. In 1886, a partial skull was recovered by Cope. A nearly complete fossil wasn't recorded until 1980. This was due, in part, to the comparative rarity of the fossil as well as the similarities to other species found within the site.

== Description ==
Size of the largest specimens of Crossopholis (dark grey, centre) compared to recent and other fossil paddlefish

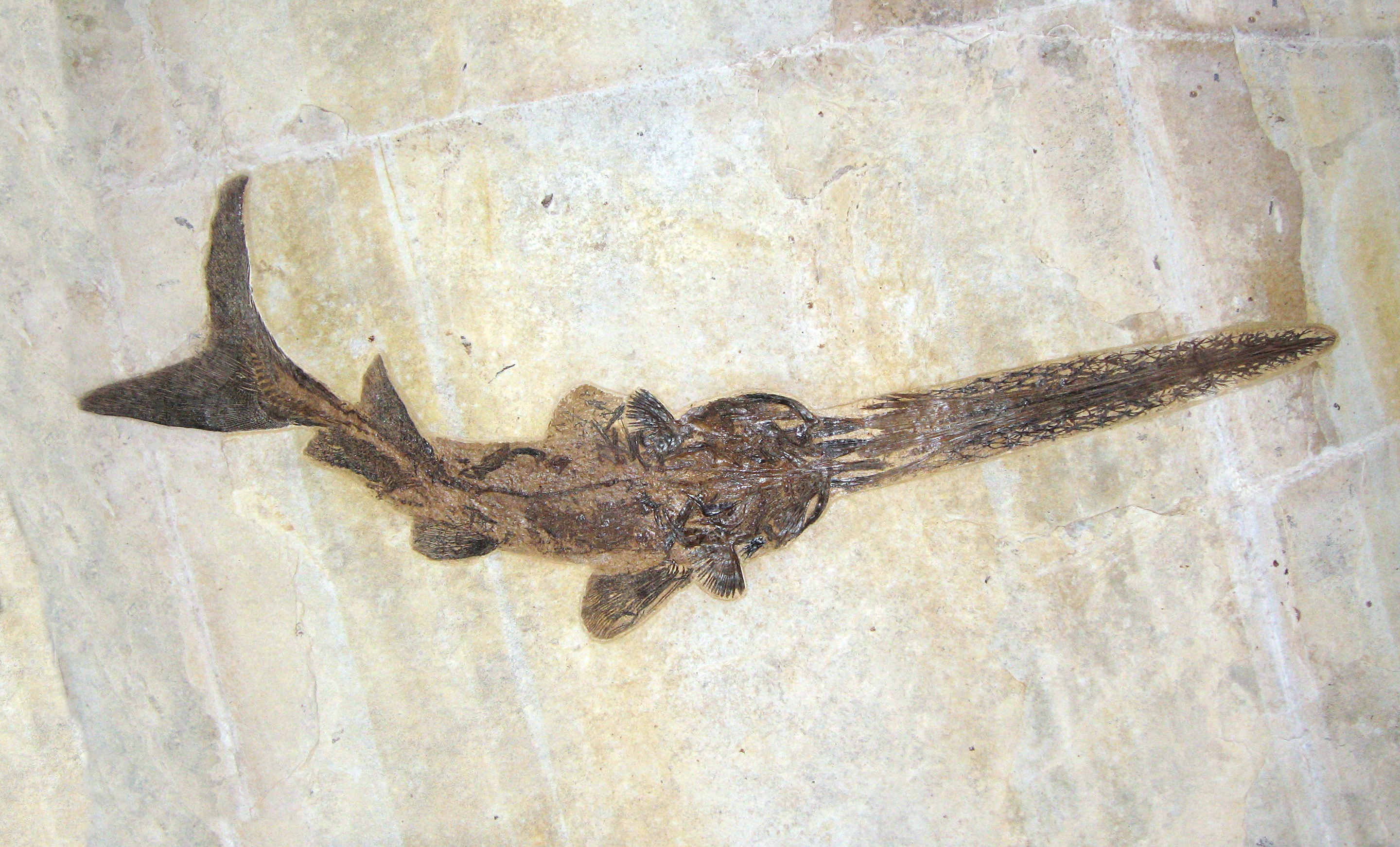
1 meter (3.3 ft) long-specimen in private collection

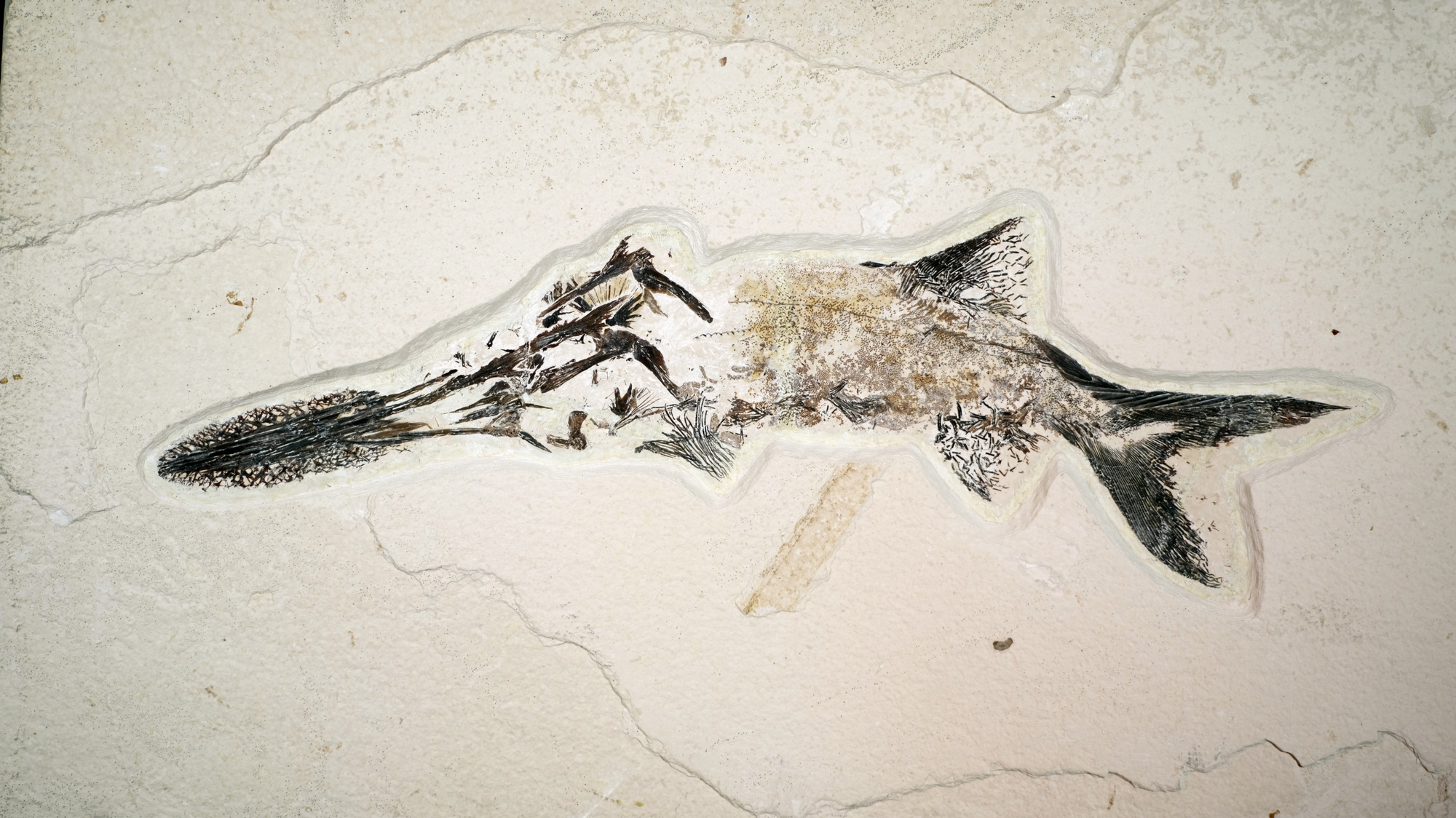
Juvenile ~34.3 centimetres (13.5 in) long specimen, showing spine-like stellate bones in the front portion of the rostrum

With a maximum recorded length of 1.48 metres (4 ft 10 in), it is smaller than its recent relatives. Unlike the living American paddlefish, it does not have filter feeding gill rakers. The skull and paddle morphology is intermediate between that of Chinese and American paddlefish, with the rostrum having a high density of stellate (star-like) bones, more similar to modern American than to Chinese paddlefish. Unlike American paddlefish, but similar to Chinese paddlefish and other fossil paddlefish, the upper jaw is not attached to the braincase, which in life would have allowed the jaws to move separately (protrude) from the rest of the skull to help seize prey, similar to sturgeons.

== Classification ==
A member of the family Polyodontidae, Crossopholis is most closely related to the American paddlefish (Polyodon spathula), and is thought to be more closely related to the American paddlefish than to the Chinese paddlefish (Psephurus gladius). Crossopholis means "fringed scales"; a reference to the thousands of tiny (less than 0.5mm) scales which covered the body of the animal.

Relationships of recent and fossil paddlefish genera, after Grande et al. (2002).

- Polyodontidae
  - - † Protopsephurus
  - - - † Paleopsephurus
    - Polyodontinae
      - † Psephurus (Chinese paddlefish)
      - - † Crossopholis
        - Polyodon
          - †Polyodon tuberculata
          - Polyodon spathula (American paddlefish)

== Paleobiology ==
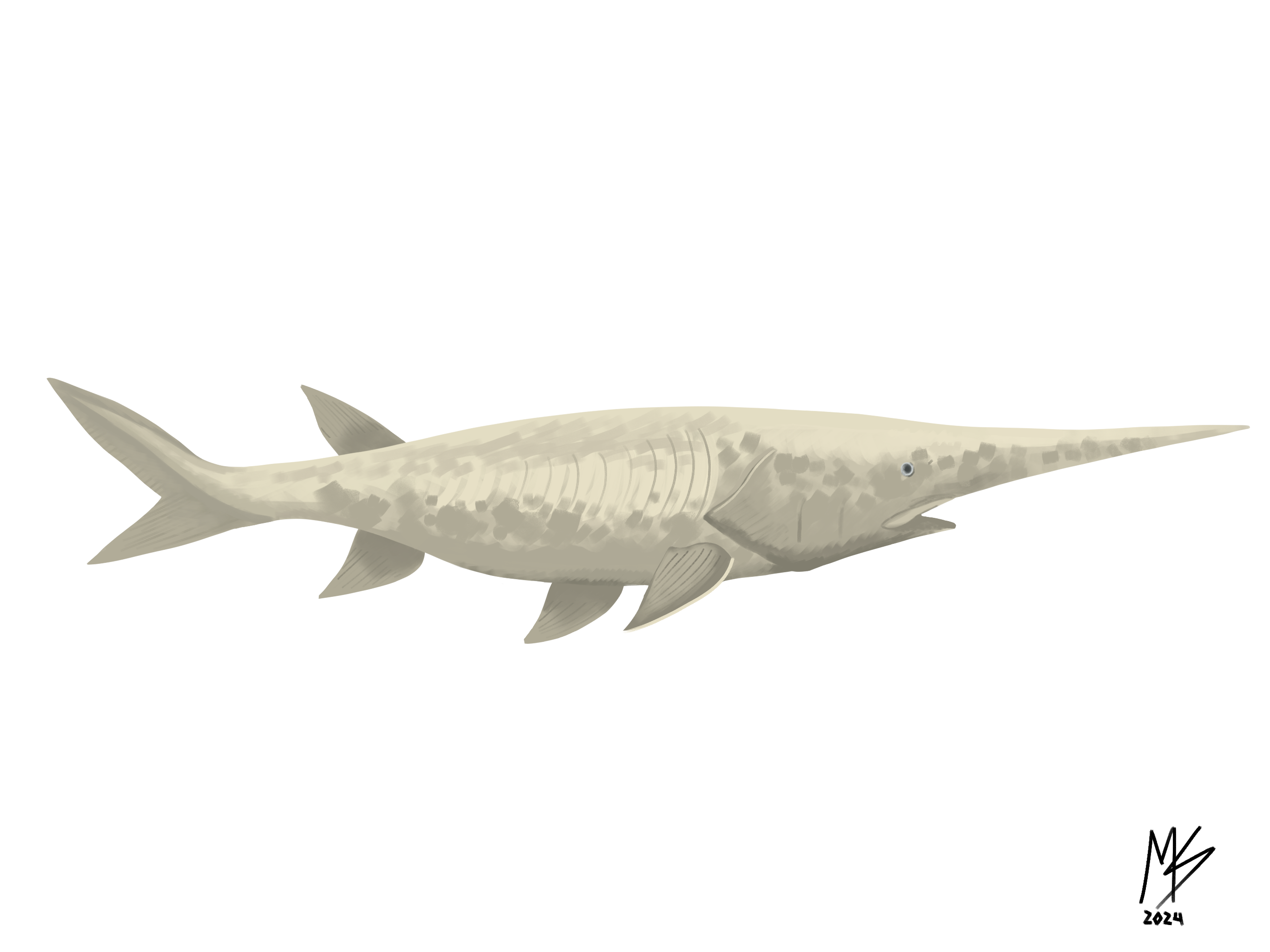
Life restoration of Crossopholis magnicaudatus

The fossils of this fish are found in the Fossil Lake area of the Green River Formation. It is more commonly found in shallower deposits of the Thompson Ranch sandwich bed in the Northeast corner of the site than in the deeper midlake sediment deposits. As the species comprises less than .02% of fossils found in the formation, it is probable that Crossopholis spent much of its life in the connecting rivers that existed to the North. This is further evidenced by that lack of juvenile specimens found in the lake area.

Crossopholis was a predator, with fossil evidence of it consuming small schooling fish such as Knightia eocaena. This is in contrast to the American paddlefish, which primarily consumes zooplankton. Research has indicated that the rostrum was an electro-sensory organ, similar to the function in extant relatives. This allowed it to find prey in poor lighting or murky water.
