= Tanis MacDonald =

Canadian poet, professor, reviewer and writer

Tanis MacDonald is a Canadian poet, professor, reviewer, and writer of creative non-fiction. She is professor at Wilfrid Laurier University with specialities in Canadian literature, women’s literature, and the elegy. She is the author of four books of poetry and one scholarly study, the editor of a selected works, and the founder of the Elegy Roadshow.

== Life and work ==
MacDonald was born in Winnipeg, Manitoba, and received her Bachelor of Arts degree in English literature at the University of Winnipeg. She moved to Toronto to study at Ryerson Theatre School (then part of Ryerson Polytechnical Institute), and worked as a classroom instructor at Centennial College, Seneca College, and Humber College until 1997, when she returned to full-time academic study. At the universities of Winnipeg and Manitoba, she studied with Mavis Reimer, Neil Besner, Brenda Austin-Smith, Dawne McCance, and Dennis Cooley, graduating with a master's degree in 2000. She attended the University of Victoria’s PhD program, and was supervised by Smaro Kamboureli. MacDonald was awarded her doctorate in 2005, and later turned her doctoral dissertation into The Daughter’s Way: Canadian Women’s Paternal Elegies (published by Wilfrid Laurier University Press). She has written extensively on poetics, the elegy, Canadian women’s poetry, and film, and is the author of more than seventy reviews of Canadian and American literature published in Canada, the United States, and the United Kingdom.

MacDonald is the author of three books of poetry two chapbooks and a non-fiction guide to writing, as well as being a frequent contributor to literary and scholarly magazines as a poet, reviewer, and scholar. She won the Bliss Carman Poetry Prize in 2002. Her poems have been anthologized in A/Cross Sections: New Manitoba Writing and Best Canadian Poetry 2015 in Canada, as well as in The New Binary Press Anthology of Poetry in Ireland. She lives in Waterloo, Ontario, and teaches Canadian literature and creative writing in the Department of English and Film Studies at Wilfrid Laurier University.

== Works ==
=== Non-Fiction ===
- Out Of Line: Daring to be an artist outside the big city. Hamilton: Wolsak & Wynn, 2018.

=== Poetry books and chapbooks ===
- Editor. Gush: menstrual manifestos for our times. Calgary: Frontenac House, 2018.
- Rue the Day. Winnipeg: Turnstone Press, 2008.
- Fortune. Winnipeg: Turnstone Press, 2003.
- Holding Ground. Hamilton: Seraphim Editions, 2000.
- Breathing November. Winnipeg: Staccato Press, 1999.
- This Speaking Plant. Hamilton: Unfinished Monument Press, 1997.

=== Scholarly books ===
- The Daughter’s Way: Canadian Women’s Paternal Elegies. Waterloo: Wilfrid Laurier University Press, 2012.
- Editor and introduction. Speaking of Power: The Selected Poetry of Di Brandt. Waterloo: Wilfrid Laurier University Press, 2006.
