= Tanis (fossil site) =

Fossil site associated with the Cretaceous–Paleogene extinction event

Coordinates: 46.0218°N 103.7910°W

Tanis is a private paleontological site in southwestern North Dakota, United States. It is part of the heavily studied Hell Creek Formation, a geological region renowned for many significant fossil discoveries from the Upper Cretaceous and lower Paleocene. Based solely on the Tanis team's publications, the Tanis is unique in that it appears to record, in detail, concrete evidence of the direct effects of the giant Chicxulub asteroid impact which struck the Gulf of Mexico 65.5 million years ago, and wiped out almost all dinosaurs and many other species at the end of the Mesozoic. The extinction event caused by this impact began the Cenozoic, in which mammals—including humans—eventually came to dominate life on Earth.

== Discoveries ==
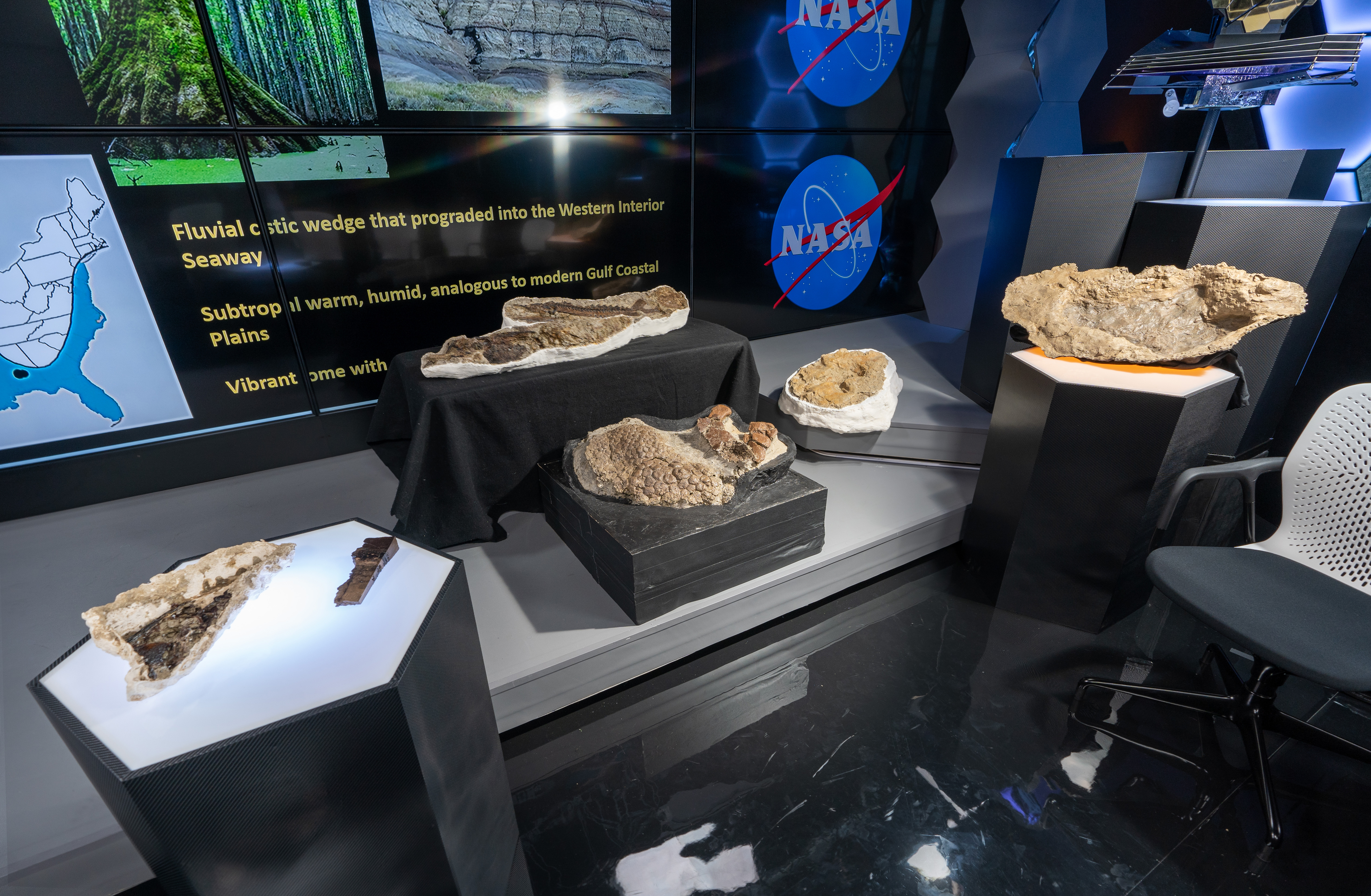
Various fossils from the Tanis site

The site was originally discovered in 2008 by University of North Georgia Professor Steve Nicklas and field paleontologist Rob Sula. Their team successfully removed fossil field jackets that contained articulated sturgeons, paddlefish, and bowfins. These fossils were delivered for research to the Field Museum of Natural History in Chicago. Recognizing the unique nature of the site, Nicklas and Sula brought in Robert DePalma, a University of Kansas graduate student, to perform additional excavations. The site was systematically excavated by Robert DePalma over several years beginning in 2012, working in near-total secrecy. Key findings were presented in two conference papers in October 2017. The full paper introducing Tanis was widely covered in worldwide media on 29 March 2019, in advance of its official publication three days later. The co-authors included Walter Alvarez and Jan Smit, both renowned experts on the K–Pg impact and extinction.

At Tanis, unlike any other known Lagerstätte site, it appears specific circumstances allowed for the preservation of moment-by-moment details caused by the impact event. These include finds which allow examination of the direct effects of the impact on plants and animals alive at the time of the large impact some 3,000 km (1,900 mi) distant. The events at Tanis occurred too soon after impact to be caused by the megatsunamis expected from any large impact near large bodies of water. Instead, much faster seismic waves from the magnitude 10 – 11.5 earthquakes probably reached the Hell Creek area as soon as ten minutes after the impact, creating seiche waves between 10–100 m (33–328 ft) high in the Western Interior Seaway. The site formed in part of a bend in an ancient river on the westward shore of the seaway, and was flooded with great force by these waves, which carried sea, land, freshwater animals and plants, and other debris several miles inland. The seiche waves exposed and covered the site twice, as millions of tiny microtektite droplets and debris from the impact were arriving on ballistic trajectories from their source in what is now the Yucatán Peninsula.

Reported findings include:

- animals and plant material preserved in three-dimensional detail and at times upright, rather than pressed flat as usual, their remains thrown together by the massive wave movements
- articulated and cartilaginous salt and freshwater fish and marine reptiles found together miles inland, with many microtektites (molten debris particles from the impact) embedded in their gills as they tried to breathe
- two new species of sturgeon: †Acipenser preparatorum and †Acipenser anisinferos
- two new species of paddlefish: †Parapsephurus willybemisi and †Pugiopsephurus inundatus
- millions of "near perfect" primary (not reworked) microtektites "almost indistinguishable" in chemical composition from previously reported Chicxulub tektites, buried contemporaneous to the fossils, in their own impact holes in the soft riverbed mud, and also preserved in amber on tree trunks
- large primitive feathers 30–40 cm long with 3.5 mm quills believed to come from large dinosaurs
- a turtle killed by impalement on a tree branch, found in the upper of two units of surge deposit, bracketed by ejecta (further evidence of the violence of the extinction event)
- broken remains from almost all known Hell Creek dinosaur groups
- fossils of hatchlings and intact eggs with embryo fossils
- fossil pterosaurs for which no other fossils exist at that time
- drowned ant nests with ants inside and chambers filled with asteroid debris
- tiny inhabited burrows from some of the first mammals in the area after the impact
- a partial mummified Thescelosaurus with its skin still intact, unearthed in 2022.

Analysis of the fish skeletons found them to be in the spring phase of their annual cyclical changes, implying that the impact had occurred in spring. Depalma et al. (2021) opted for a spring-summer range, but During et al. (2024) reevaluated and criticized this study based on its lack of primary data, unidentified laboratory for the analyses, insufficient methods for accurate replication and problematic isotopic graphs with irregular data and error bars.

The hundreds of fish remains are distributed by size, and generally show evidence of tetany (a body posture related to suffocation in fish), suggesting the suffocation of an entire population. Fragile remains spanning the layers of debris show the site was laid down in a single brief event.

The exceptional nature of the findings and conclusions led some scientists to await further scrutiny before agreeing that the discoveries at Tanis had been correctly understood, further exacerbated by concerns over the reliability of data with researchers racing to claim credit for findings.

== Background ==
=== The K-Pg extinction event ===
| Tanis (fossil site) is located in North America |
Location of Tanis and of the Chicxulub crater Left: present day, Right: at impact 65.5 million years ago

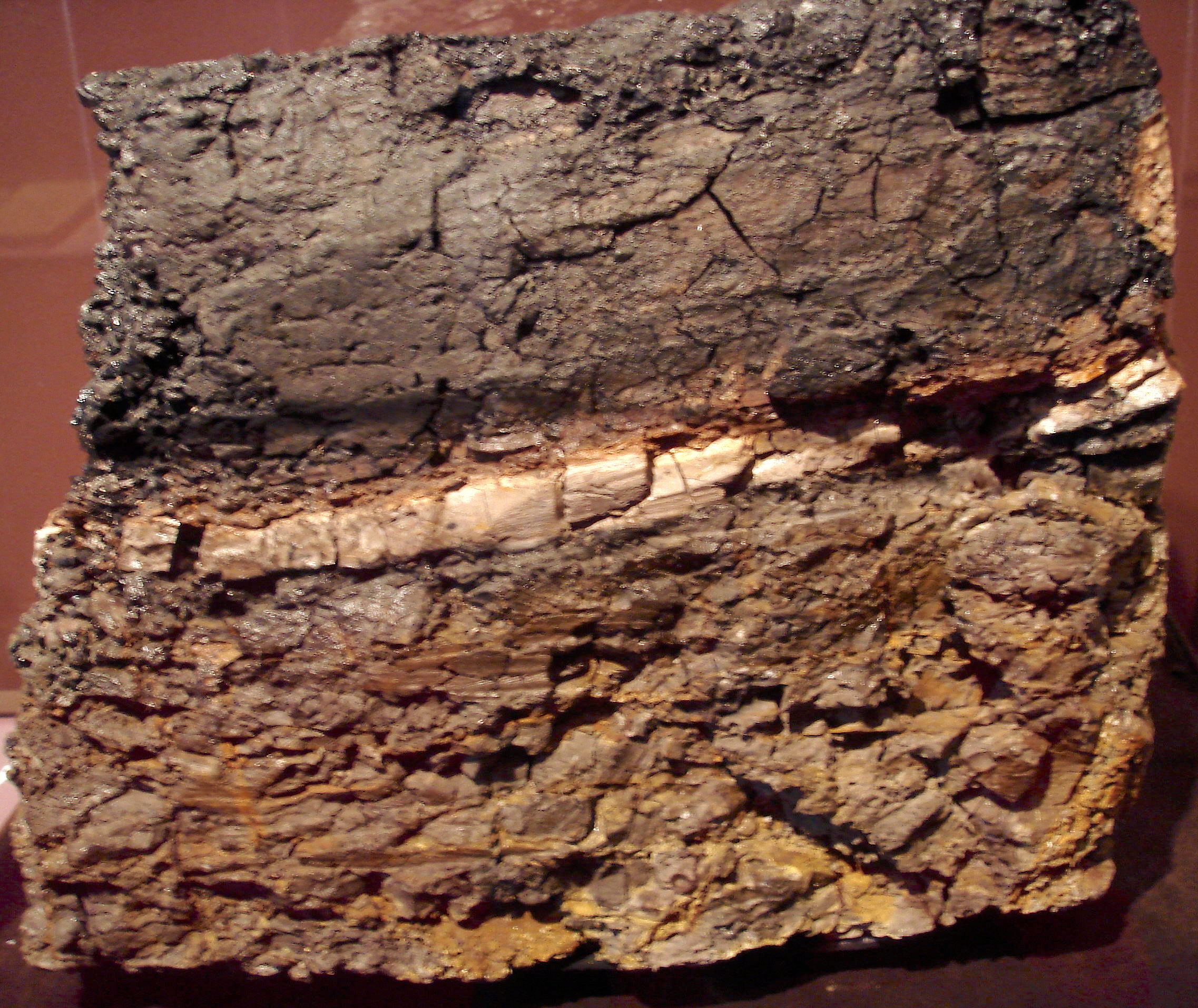
K-Pg boundary sample from Wyoming. The intermediate claystone layer contains 1000 times more iridium than the upper and lower layers (San Diego Natural History Museum).

The Cretaceous–Paleogene ("K-Pg" or "K-T") extinction event around 65.5 million years ago wiped out almost all dinosaurs and many other species. Proposed by Luis and Walter Alvarez, it is now widely accepted that the extinction was caused by a huge asteroid or bolide that impacted Earth in the shallow seas of the Gulf of Mexico, leaving behind the Chicxulub crater. The impactor tore through the Earth's crust, creating huge earthquakes, giant waves, and a crater 180 kilometers (112 mi) wide, and blasted aloft trillions of tons of dust, debris, and climate-changing sulfates from the gypsum seabed, and it may have created firestorms worldwide. With the exception of some ectothermic species such as the ancestors of the modern leatherback sea turtle and crocodiles, no tetrapods weighing more than 25 kg (55 lb) survived. It marked the end of the Cretaceous period and the Mesozoic Era, opening the Cenozoic Era that continues today.

However, because it is rare in any case for animals and plants to be fossilized, the fossil record had left some major questions unanswered, of which some remain actively debated. One of these is whether dinosaurs were already declining at the time of the event due to ongoing volcanic climate change. Also, there is little evidence on the detailed effects of the event on Earth and its biosphere. No fossil beds were yet known that could clearly show the details that might resolve these questions. There is considerable detail for times greater than hundreds of thousands of years either side of the event, and for certain kinds of change on either side of the K-Pg boundary layer. But relatively little fossil evidence is available from times nearer the crucial event, a difficulty known as the Signor–Lipps effect.

=== Hell Creek Formation ===
The Hell Creek Formation is a well-known and much-studied fossil-bearing formation (geological region) of mostly Upper Cretaceous and some lower Paleocene rock that stretches across portions of Montana, North Dakota, South Dakota, and Wyoming in North America. The formation is named for early studies at Hell Creek, located near Jordan, Montana, and it was designated as a National Natural Landmark in 1966.

The formation contains a series of fresh and brackish-water clays, mudstones, and sandstones deposited during the Maastrichtian and Danian (respectively, the end of the Cretaceous and the beginning of the Paleogene periods) by fluvial activity in fluctuating river channels and deltas and very occasional peaty swamp deposits along the low-lying eastern continental margin fronting the late Cretaceous Western Interior Seaway. The iridium-enriched Cretaceous–Paleogene boundary, which separates the Cretaceous from the Cenozoic, is distinctly visible as a discontinuous thin marker above and occasionally within the formation. Numerous famous fossils of plants and animals, including many types of dinosaur fossils, have been discovered there.

At the time of the Chicxulub impact, the present-day North American continent was still forming. Most of central North America had recently been a large shallow seaway, called the Western Interior Seaway (also known as the North American Sea or the Western Interior Sea), and parts were still submerged. This had initially been a seaway between separate continents, but it had narrowed in the late Cretaceous to become, in effect, a large inland extension to the Gulf of Mexico. The Hell Creek Formation was at this time very low-lying or partly submerged land at the northern end of the seaway, and the Chicxulub impact occurred in the shallow seas at the southern end, approximately 3,050 km (1,900 miles) from the site.

Although Tanis and Chicxulub were connected by the remaining Interior Seaway, the massive water waves from the impact area were probably not responsible for the deposits at Tanis. Any water-borne waves would have arrived between 18 and 26 hours later, long after the microtektites had already fallen back to earth, and far too late to leave the geological record found at the site. It is not even clear whether the massive waves were able to traverse the entire Interior Seaway. Instead, the initial papers on Tanis conclude that much faster earthquake waves, the primary waves travelling through rock at about 5 km/s (11,000 mph), probably reached Hell Creek within six minutes, and quickly caused massive water surges known as seiches in the shallow waters close to Tanis. Seiche waves often occur shortly after significant earthquakes, even thousands of miles away, and can be sudden and violent. Some recent examples include the 1950 Assam-Tibet earthquake (India/China) (seiches in England and Norway), the 1964 Alaskan earthquake (seiches in Puerto Rico), and the 2010 Chile earthquake (seiches in Louisiana). Notably, after the powerful magnitude 9.0 – 9.1 Tōhoku earthquake in 2011, slower secondary waves traveled over 8,000 km (5,000 miles) in less than 30 minutes to cause seiches around 1.5–1.8 m (4.9–5.9 ft) high in Norway.

The Chicxulub impact is believed to have triggered earthquakes estimated at magnitude 10 – 11.5, releasing up to 4000 times the energy of the Tohoku quake.^{Note 1} Co-author Mark Richards, a professor of earth sciences focusing on dynamic earth crust processes, suggests that the resulting seiche waves would have been approximately 10–100 m (33–328 ft) high in the Western Interior Seaway near Tanis and credibly, could have created the 10 – 11 m (33 – 36 feet) high water movements evidenced inland at the site; the time taken by the seismic waves to reach the region and cause earthquakes almost exactly matched the flight time of the microtektites found at the site. This would resolve conflicting evidence that huge water movements had occurred in the Hell Creek region near Tanis much less than an hour after impact, although the first megatsunamis from the impact zone could not have arrived at the site for almost a full day.

== Site description ==
Site details are as follows:^{Note1}

The Tanis river

The site was originally a point bar—a gently sloped crescent-shaped area of deposit that accumulates on the inside bend of streams and rivers below the slip-off slope. Point bars are common in mature or meandering streams. Both the site and the river are called Tanis.

From the size of the deposits beneath the flood debris, the Tanis River was a "deep and large" river with a point bar that was towards the larger size found in Hell's Creek, suggesting a river tens or hundreds of meters wide. The river flowed eastward from an inland area to the west, and the site itself was in an ancient river valley close to the western shore of the Interior Seaway. Although other flooding is evidenced in Hells Creek, the Tanis deposit does not appear to relate to any other known marine transgression (inland shoreline movement).

Characteristics of the site include:

- "the fluctuating, reticulated terminal-Cretaceous shoreline was not far away from the Tanis region"
- "The Event Deposit is a 1.3-m-thick bed that shows an overall grading upward from coarse sand to fine silt/clay and is associated with a deeply incised, large meandering river ... [and] sharply overlies the aggrading surface of a point bar..."
- "the point bar exhibits ~10.5 m of isochronous elevation change along its inclined surface and its width extends <50 m perpendicular to (ancient) flow direction. These dimensions are in the upper size range for point bars in the Hell Creek Formation and compare favorably with ... modern rivers with large channels that are tens to hundreds of meters wide"
- "[The Event flood deposits are] indicative of a westward or inland flow direction that is opposite of the natural (ancient) current of the ... Tanis River"
- "[The] Event Deposit is restricted to (an ancient) river valley and is conspicuously absent from the adjacent floodplains."
- "Tanis exhibits a depositional scenario that was unusual in being highly conducive to exceptional (largely three dimensional) preservation of many articulated carcasses (Konservat-Lagerstätte). Such Konservat-Lagerstätten are rare ... because they require special depositional circumstances. Tanis is the only known site in the Hell Creek Formation where such conditions were met, [so] the deposit attests to the exceptional nature of the [Event]. The findings each preclude correlation with either the Cantapeta or Breien marine incursions (inland-directed floodings) ... the Tanis Event Deposit cannot be correlated with the known Hell Creek marine transgressions."

The event deposit

The deposit itself is about 1.3m thick, sharply overlaying the point bar, in a drape-like manner. It comprises two layers with sand and silt grading (coarse sands at the bottom, finer silt/clay particles at the top). It can be divided into two layers, a bottom layer about 0.5m thick ("unit 1"), and a top layer about 0.8m thick (unit 2), capped by a 1 – 2 cm layer of impactite tonstein that is indistinguishable from other dual layered KPg impact ejection materials found in Hells Creek, and finally a layer around 6 cm thick of plant remains. The excavated pointbar and event deposits show that the point bar had been exposed to the air for a considerable time, with evidence of habitation and filled burrows, before an abrupt, turbulent, high energy event filled these burrows and laid down the deposits. The event included waves with at least 10 meters run-up height (the vertical distance a wave travels after it reaches land).

== Other media ==
A BBC documentary on Tanis, titled Dinosaurs: The Final Day, with Sir David Attenborough, was broadcast on 15 April 2022. This program was also aired as "Dinosaur Apocalypse: The Last Day" on PBS Nova starting 11 May 2022.

== Notes ==
^Note 1 This section is drawn from the original 2019 paper and its supplementary materials, which describe the site in detail. Page numbers in this section refer to those papers.
