= Polyodon tuberculata =

Polyodon tuberculata Temporal range: Danian ~65.018–65.064 Ma

Scientific classification
- Kingdom: Animalia
- Phylum: Chordata
- Class: Actinopterygii
- Order: Acipenseriformes
- Family: Polyodontidae
- Genus: Polyodon
- Species: †P. tuberculata

Binomial name
- †Polyodon tuberculata Grande & Bemis, 1991

Extinct species of fish

Polyodon tuberculata is an extinct species of acipenseriform ray-finned fish. It has only been found in sites in Montana dating back to less 1 million years after the Cretaceous-Paleocene Extinction. It is larger than the American paddlefish (Polyodon spathula), the only extant species of its genus. The species was large compared to living American paddlefish, likely reaching a body length of at least 2 metres (6 ft 7 in). The most notable feature of P. tuberculata is the presence of tubercles that would have been weakly attached to the "paddle" and skull roof. Just like the modern species, P. tuberculata was a filter-feeder in freshwater environments.

== History and naming ==
The holotype (UCMP 130629) is made up of a mostly-complete fossil skull along with an associated upper caudal lobe and was first referenced by Laurie J. Bryant in 1989 as "Polyodontidae, undescribed". This specimen was collected in 1976 from the Farrand Channel of the upper Tullock Formation located in Garfield County, Montana by Harley Garbani. At the time, the material was being studied by W. Bemis at the University of Massachusetts. In this first mention of the material, the specimen known as LACM 126130 was considered as similar to the holotype, though it was later believed to be a specimen of Paleopsephurus wilsoni by multiple authors. The holotype would later be described in detail by Grande & Bemis (1991) from the Field Museum of Natural History and University of Massachusetts respectively. More specimens from the Fort Union Formation were later be described by Murray et al. in 2020 based on three specimens collected during fieldwork in 2014 and 2015. These specimens are also made up of skull material, though one (UWBM 109828) also contains the pectoral girdle.

The species name "tuberculata" refers to the tubercles present on the holotype specimen's skull roof.

== Description ==
The overall anatomy of Polyodon tuberculata is very similar to what is seen in the modern species, P. spathula; the fossil fish had a long skull that was mostly made up of an extended "paddle" formed by a number of median rostral bones along with a network of stellate bones; though there are fewer stellate bones than what is seen in P. spathula. A complete rostrum is not known from the species though it was most likely similar to what is seen in the modern species, with it not thinning anteriorly. The skull roof of P. tuberculata is also similar to its extant relative though it does possess a series of tubercles and crests on the post-temporal, frontals, and parietals. Due to these tubercles not being present on specimens besides the holotype, it has been suggested that they would have been weakly attached to the skull roof and "paddle". The sub-opercle is the only bone of the opercular series preserved in specimens and is more ossified than in P. spathula. Due to the back of the sub-opercle having a scalloped shape, it has been suggested that there would have been splint-like projections in this area. The gill arches of the fish are mostly known from articulated gill rakers that were overall thin.

P. tuberculata was large in comparison to living American paddlefish. The original description from 1991 estimated that the total length of the holotype individual would have been around 2 metres (6 ft 7 in), close in size to the largest recorded American paddlefish (around 2.16 metres (7 ft 1 in)). A 2009 study alternately suggested a body length of 2.605 metres (8 ft 6.6 in). Not much of the postcrania of the fish is known outside of the pectoral area and a small piece of the caudal fin. Unlike the living species, the first ray of the pectoral fin is the same thickness as the rest of the rays though it is still the longest ray. Based on the small amount of the caudal fin preserved, the shape would have been very similar to what is seen in P. spathula. Like other acipenseriforms, rhombic scales would have been present on the upper lobe of the caudal fin.

== Paleobiology ==
Based on the presence of elongated gill rakers and toothless jaws on specimens of P. tuberculata, it is suggested that these fish would have been filter feeders similar to their extant relative. Both formations that bear these specimens are representative of freshwater ecosystems with the fish being found in deposits less than 1 million years after the Cretaceous-Paleocene Extinction. The climate of Montana during this time would have been seasonally wet with the flora found at the Fort Union Formation suggesting a subtropical environment. Angiosperms made up almost all of the known flora with "Carya" and Macginitiea being the most common plant macrofossils found. Based on various aspects of the geology of the formation, the delta of the Catatumbo River and Lake Maracaibo have been suggested to be comparable to the bodies of water preserved at the formation. These bodies of water and those found at the Tullock Formation would have been a part of floodplains made up of meandering channels, similar to the underlying Hell Creek Formation. Backswamps are also preserved in the form of lignite facies at the Tullock Formation.
