= Paleopsephurus =

Paleopsephurus Temporal range: Maastrichtian

Scientific classification
- Kingdom: Animalia
- Phylum: Chordata
- Class: Actinopterygii
- Order: Acipenseriformes
- Family: Polyodontidae
- Subfamily: †Paleopsephurinae
- Genus: †Paleopsephurus; MacAlpin, 1947
- Species: †P. wilsoni

Binomial name
- †Paleopsephurus wilsoni MacAlpin, 1947

Extinct genus of fishes

Paleopsephurus is an extinct genus of paddlefish (Polyodontidae). At present the genus contains the single species Paleopsephurus wilsoni. The genus is known from the Late Cretaceous (Maastrichtian) aged Hell Creek Formation of Montana.

== History and classification ==
The genus was described from three partial specimens currently residing in the collections of the University of Michigan Museum of Paleontology in Ann Arbor, Michigan, USA. Specimen number 22206 U.M. is a complete and well preserved skull with some denticles, pectoral girdle and pectoral fins. The second and third specimens were found in a block of matrix from the same location as 2226 U.M.. Specimen 22207 U.M. is a portion of the caudal region of a paddlefish, while 22208 U.M. is a partial shoulder with associated pectoral fin. While the specimens were found close to each other, it is impossible to determine if they represent a single individual, and as such were described as three separate fish specimens. The specimens were collected from a sandstone outcrop of the Hell Creek Formation 24 miles (39 km) southeast of Fort Peck, Montana by a University of Michigan Museum of Paleontology expedition in 1938. the fossils were in close association with the holotype specimen of the extinct sturgeon Protoscaphirhynchus squamosus.

The Paleopsephurus specimens were first studied by American paleontologist and ichthyologist Archie Justus MacAlpin. He published his detailed 1947 type description in the journal Contributions from the Museum of Paleontology, University of Michigan.

== Description ==
Size of the holotype of Paleopsephurus (dark yellow, bottom left), compared to a human and other paddlefish

The holotype skull is about 274 millimetres (10.8 in) long. Grande and Bemis 1991 estimated that the total length would have been about 56 centimetres (22 in), while the original description by MacAplin suggested a total length of 65 centimetres (26 in). The skull roof is poorly preserved. The stellate bones are loosely packed and more poorly developed compared to the ones in Crossopholis or Polyodon, but are similar to those of Psephurus.

== Ecology ==
Like other non-Polyodon paddlefish, Paleopsephurus was likely piscivorous. Like other paddlefish it is thought to have lived in freshwater.

== Phylogeny ==
Paleopsephurus exhibits a combination of characters which suggests that it is more derived than Protopsephurus, but is more basal than Crossopholis, Polyodon, or Psephurus. Relationships of the genera, after Grande et al. (2002).

- - Polyodontidae
    - - †Protopsephurus
    - - - †Paleopsephurus
      - Polyodontinae
        - †Psephurus
        - - †Crossopholis
          - Polyodon
