= Umut Taniş =

Turkish footballer

Personal information
- Date of birth: 10 February 2004 (age 22)
- Place of birth: Şırnak, Turkey
- Position: Winger

Team information
- Current team: Malatya Yeşilyurtspor
- Number: 20

Youth career
- Yeni Malatyaspor

Senior career*
Years	Team	Apps	(Gls)
2022–2025	Yeni Malatyaspor	36	(0)
2025–	Malatya Yeşilyurtspor	6	(0)
- * Club domestic league appearances and goals as of 24 October 2025

Umut Taniş (born 10 February 2004) is a Turkish footballer who plays as a winger for TFF 3. Lig club Malatya Yeşilyurtspor.

== Career ==
Taniş is a youth product of Yeni Malatyaspor, and was promoted to their senior team in 2022. He made his professional debut with Yeni Malatyaspor in a 1–0 Süper Lig loss to Giresunspor on 10 April 2022.
