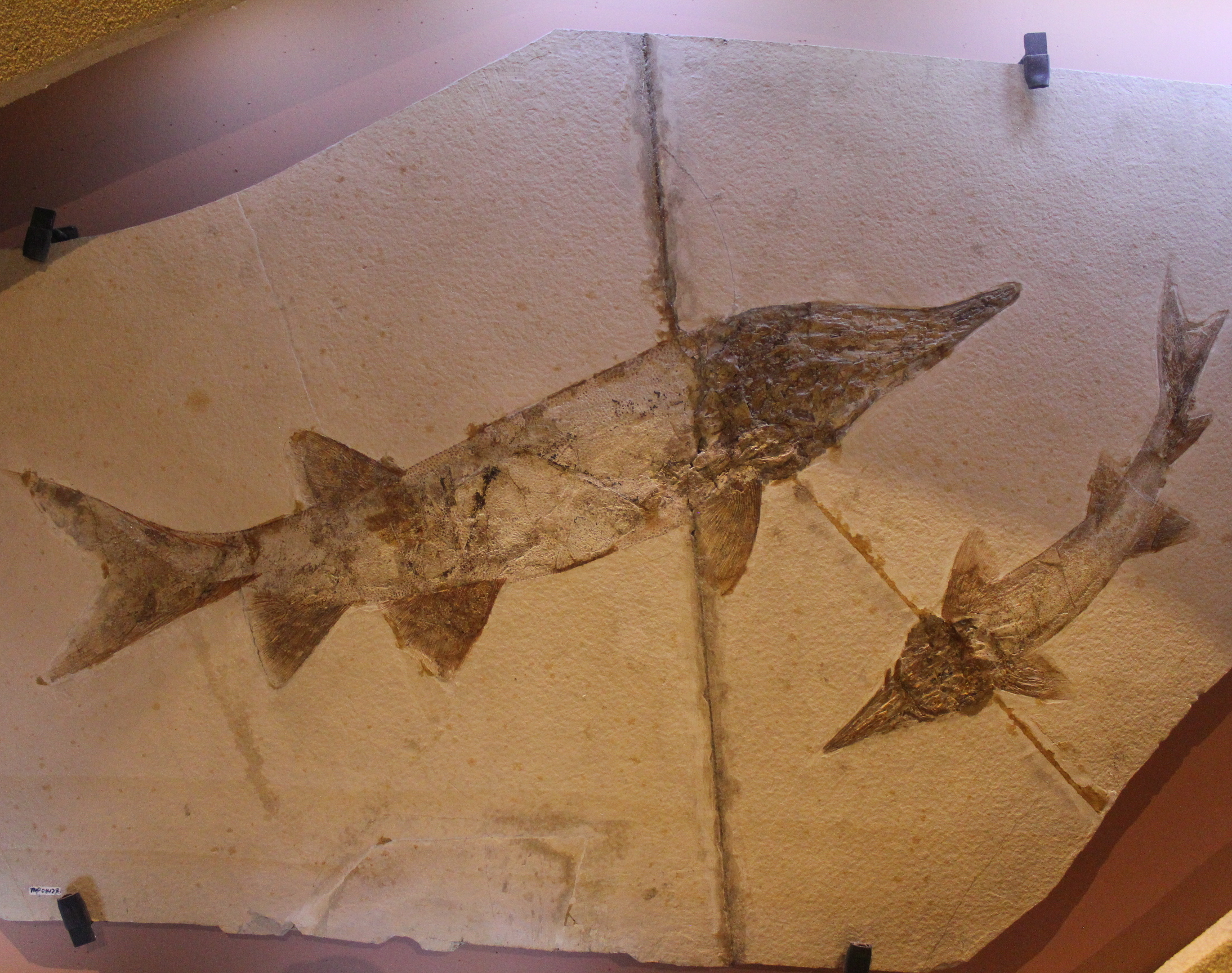
- Fossil of P. liui, Tianjin Natural History Museum

Scientific classification
- Kingdom: Animalia
- Phylum: Chordata
- Class: Actinopterygii
- Order: Acipenseriformes
- Family: Polyodontidae
- Subfamily: †Protopsephurinae
- Genus: †Protopsephurus; Lu, 1994
- Species: †P. liui

Binomial name
- †Protopsephurus liui Lu, 1994

= Protopsephurus =

Protopsephurus Temporal range: Early Cretaceous

Extinct genus of fishes

Protopsephurus is an extinct genus of paddlefish containing the single species Protopsephurus liui, known from the Yixian, Jiufotang and Huajiying formations in Liaoning, northern China from the Barremian to Aptian ages of the Early Cretaceous period around 125-120 million years ago. It is currently the oldest and most basal paddlefish known.

== Description ==
Size of the largest specimens of Protopsephurus (dark red, left centre), compared to other paddlefish

The species is known from numerous specimens ranging up to about 77 cm (30 in) long. The rostrum is shorter than that in any other known paddlefish, and is more sturgeon-like. The morphology of the skull roof is also more archaic than any other paddlefish. The axial skeleton is poorly ossified. Like other extinct polyodontids, it also has tiny non-interlocking scales approximately 1 mm in diameter called denticles that cover the trunk, which bear a fringe of spikes.

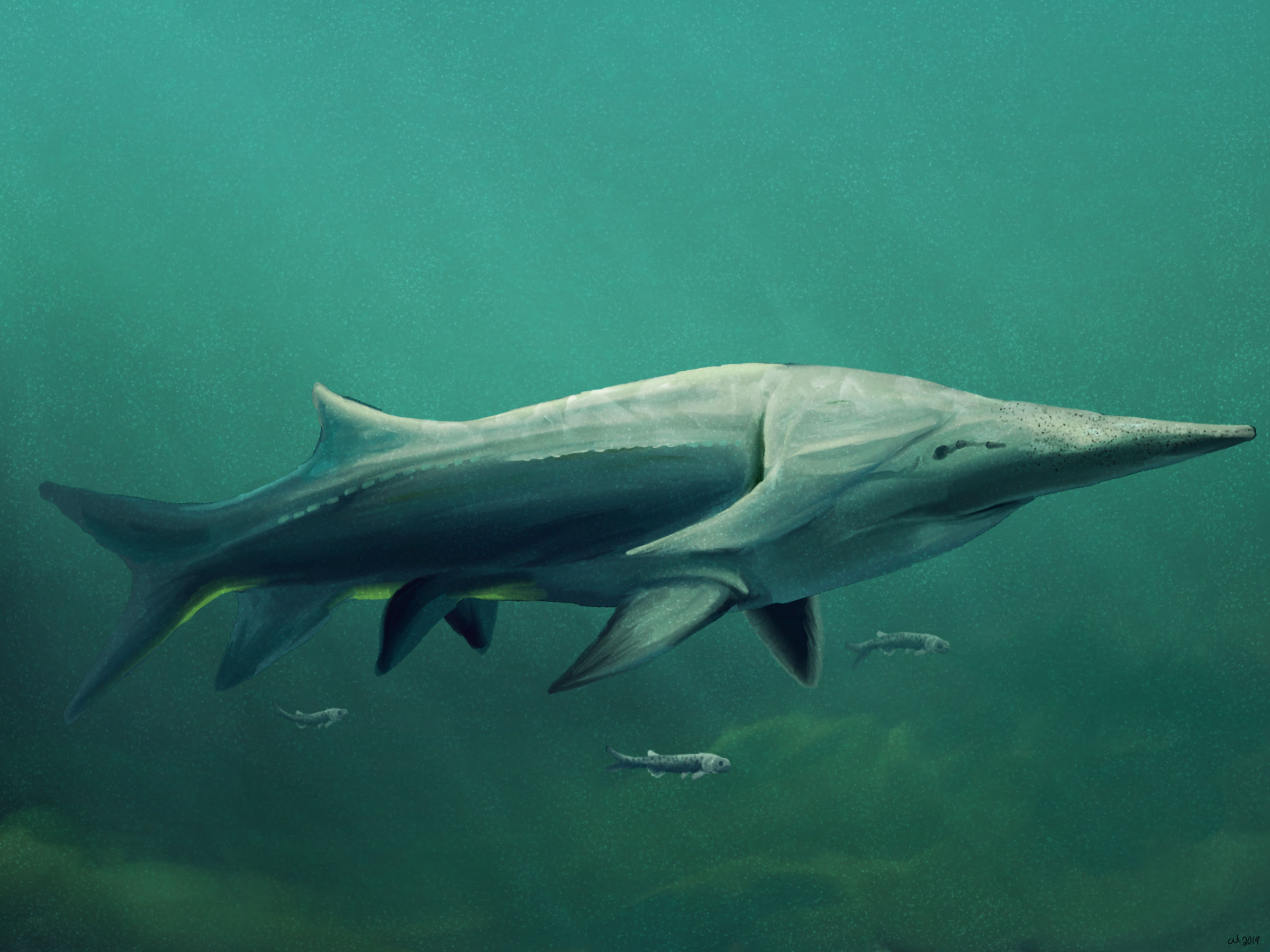
A reconstruction of Protopsephurus, surrounded by smaller Lycoptera fish, which were likely prey for Protopsephurus

== Ecology ==
Protopsephurus is thought to have been piscivorous, feeding on smaller fish. One adult specimen of Protopsephurus has been observed with a specimen of the smaller fish Lycoptera, the most common fish in the formation, preserved in its stomach. Piscivory is likely the ancestral ecology of paddlefish, with only the genus Polyodon making the transition to being planktivorous filter feeders.

== Taxonomy ==
The name comes from Ancient Greek words "protos" (first) and Psephurus, the genus name of the Chinese paddlefish. Originally named by Lu in 1994, it was redescribed in detail by Lance Grande and colleagues in 2002. Protopsephurus is widely agreed to be the most primitive known paddlefish, and in 1996 was placed into its own subfamily Protopsephurinae. Cladogram following Grande et al. 2002:

- - Polyodontidae
    - - †Protopsephurus
    - - - †Paleopsephurus
      - Polyodontinae
        - †Psephurus (Chinese paddlefish)
        - - †Crossopholis
          - Polyodon spathula (American paddlefish)

== See also ==
- Jiufotang Formation
- Paleobiota of the Yixian Formation
