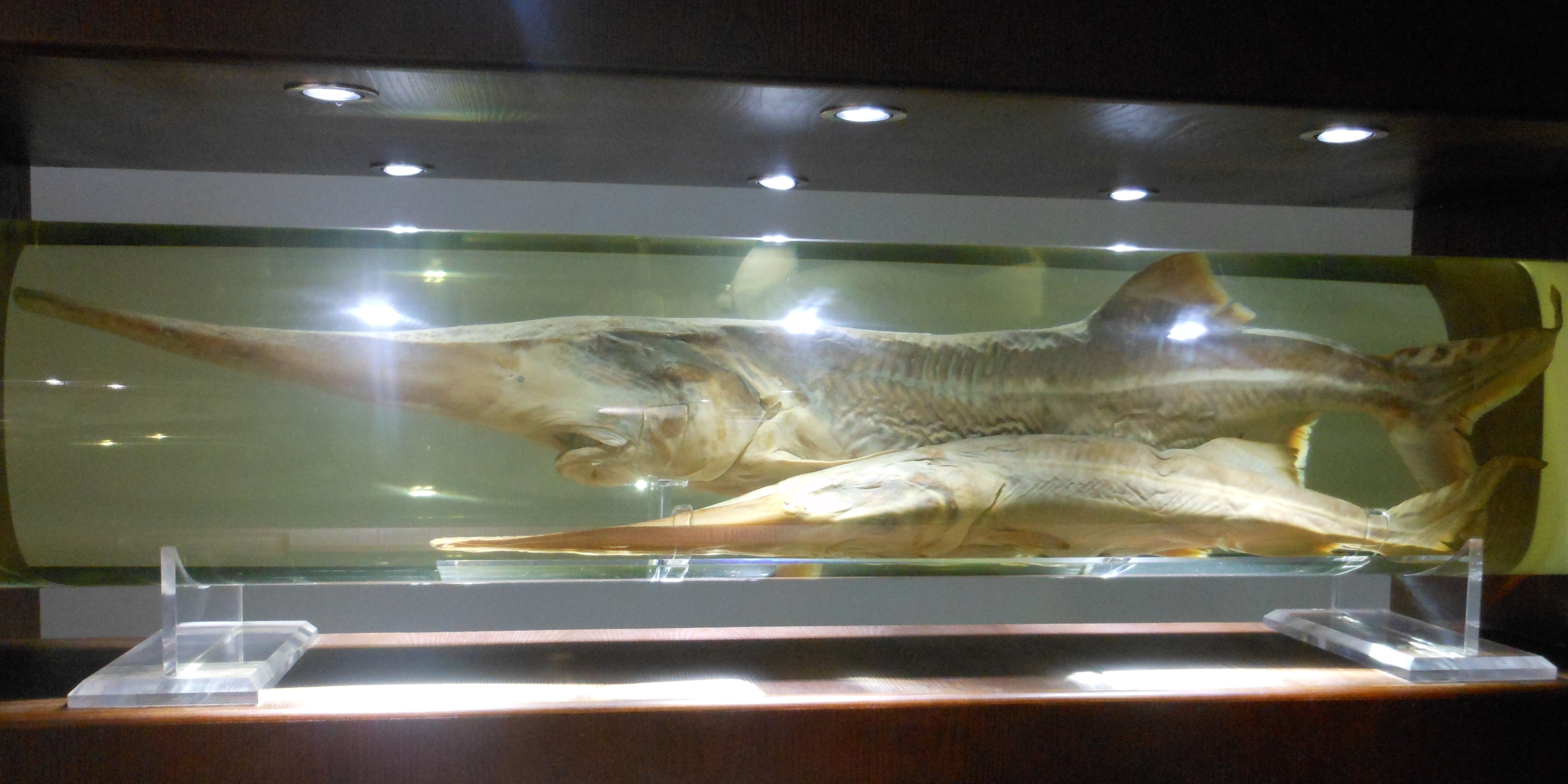
- Preserved specimens at Museum of Hydrobiological Sciences, Institute of Hydrobiology, Wuhan, China

Conservation status
- Extinct (2022) (IUCN 3.1)

Scientific classification
- Kingdom: Animalia
- Phylum: Chordata
- Class: Actinopterygii
- Order: Acipenseriformes
- Family: Polyodontidae
- Genus: †Psephurus; Günther, 1873
- Species: †P. gladius

Binomial name
- †Psephurus gladius (von Martens, 1862)

Synonyms
- Polyodon gladius von Martens, 1862; Spatularia (Polyodon) angustifolium Kaup, 1862; Polyodon angustifolium (Kaup, 1862)

= Chinese paddlefish =

Extinct species of fish

The Chinese paddlefish (Psephurus gladius; simplified Chinese: 白鲟; traditional Chinese: 白鱘; pinyin: báixún: literal translation: "white sturgeon"), also known as the Chinese swordfish, is an extinct species of fish that was formerly native to the Yangtze and Yellow River basins in China. With records of specimens over 3.6 metres (12 ft) and possibly 7 m (23 ft) in length, it was one of the largest species of primarily freshwater fish. It was the only species in the genus Psephurus and one of two recent species of paddlefish (Polyodontidae), the other being the still-living American paddlefish (Polyodon spathula). The species was not a strictly freshwater fish, with individuals having migrated down the Yangtze into the sea as juveniles, where they spent time in coastal waters, before returning into the river by adulthood, and migrating upriver to spawn. Unlike the American paddlefish, which is a filter feeder on plankton, the Chinese paddlefish was a piscivorous predator that primarily consumed small to medium-sized fish.

Since the 1990s, the species was officially listed by the International Union for Conservation of Nature (IUCN) as critically endangered, and was last seen alive in 2003. A 2019 paper including scientists from the Yangtze River Fisheries Research Institute found the species to be extinct based on its absence from extensive capture surveys, with the extinction suggested to have occurred by 2005, and no later than 2010, although it had become functionally extinct by 1993. It was unanimously agreed to be extinct by the Species Survival Commission Sturgeon Specialist Group of the IUCN on 15 September 2019, with its conservation status being formally updated by the IUCN Red List in July 2022.

The main cause of its extinction was the construction of the Gezhouba Dam in 1981, fragmenting the population and blocking the migration of the fish to its upriver spawning grounds required to sustain its population. Overfishing also played a significant role in its decline. Fishing of the Chinese paddlefish dates back centuries, with annual harvests reaching 25 tons by the 1970s.

== Description ==
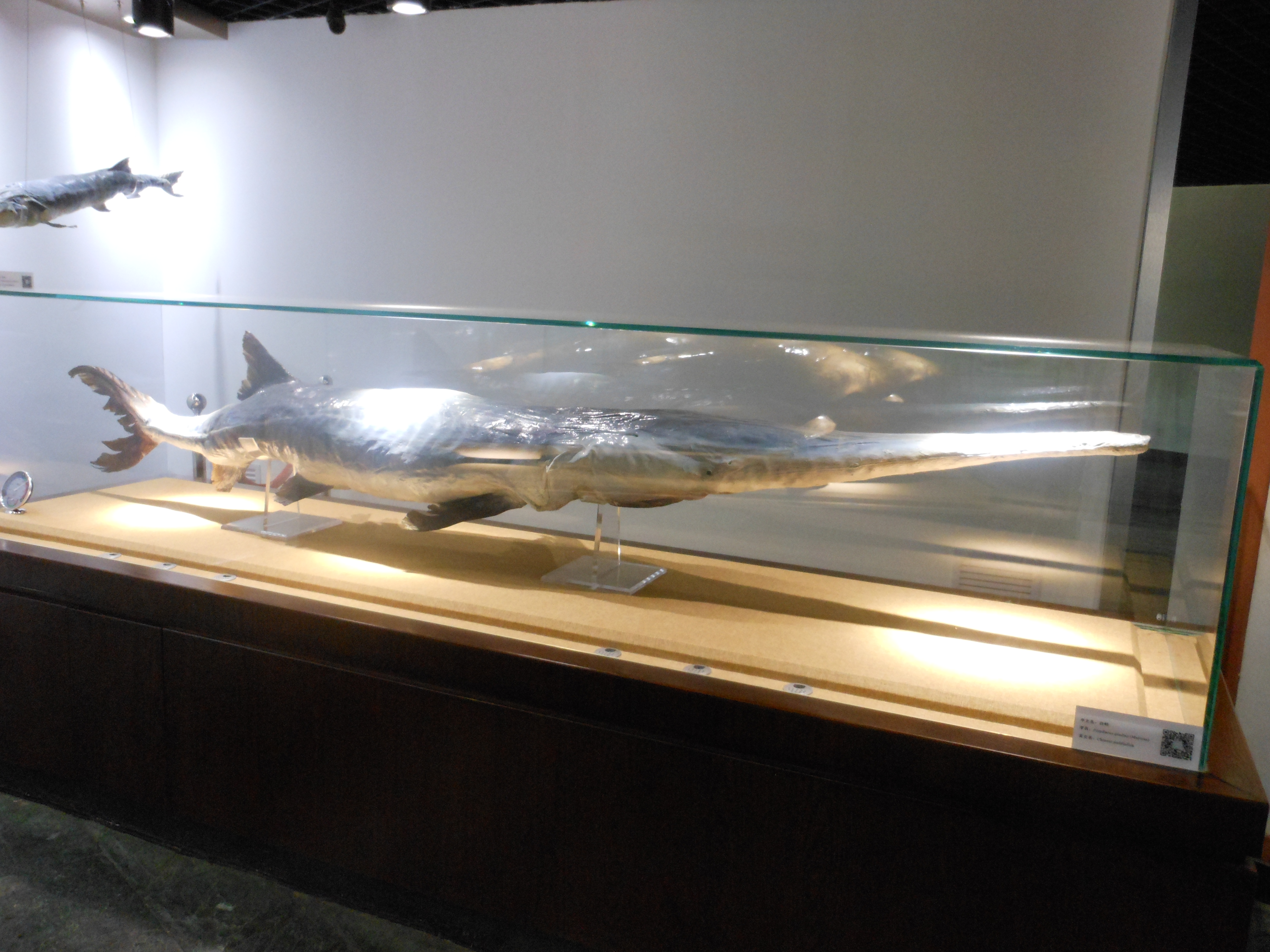
A specimen at Museum of Hydrobiological Sciences, Wuhan Institute of Hydrobiology

The Chinese paddlefish had a white underbelly, and its back and head were grey. Its dorsal and anal fins were situated considerably far back on the body. The paddle-like rostrum was narrow and pointed, and was between a quarter and up to a third of total body length. Its eyes were small and round. The tail fin was heterocercal (spine extending into the upper lobe), with the lower lobe being well developed. The skull is more elongate and narrower than that of the American paddlefish, and lacks the sculpturing present on the skull bones of other paddlefish, with the stellate (star-shaped) bones on the rostrum less numerous than those of the American paddlefish. The teeth were small, sharp, canine shaped and inward curling, and became proportionally smaller relative to the jaw during growth, and in mature adults were completely fused into the bone. Compared to Polyodon, the jaws were shorter, and had a proportionately narrower gape, and unlike the American paddlefish, but similar to fossil paddlefish, the upper jaw was not firmly attached to the braincase. Like other paddlefish, the skeleton was largely cartilaginous. The body lacked scales, except for small scales in the caudal peduncle and caudal fin.

Juveniles attained a weight of around 1 to 1.5 kilograms (2 to 3 lb) by their first winter and a length of 1 m (3 ft) and a weight of about 3.3 kg (7 lb 4 oz) by the time they were a year old. Beyond this length, proportional weight gain relative to body length dramatically increased, reaching a weight of about 12.5 kg (28 lb) by the time they were around 1.5 m (5 ft) long. They reached sexual maturity at a weight of around 25 kg (55 lb). Female fish are suggested to have grown larger than male fish once sexually mature, though they grew at similar rates prior to this.

Size of the 2003 female specimen, (red, top), compared to the American and fossil paddlefish

The maximum length of the Chinese paddlefish is often quoted as 7 m (23 ft), with this estimate apparently being given by C. Ping (1931) as quoted by John Treadwell Nichols in 1943, though according to Lance Grande and William Bemis in 1991, the Chinese paddlefish was only definitively known to have body lengths in excess of 3 metres (9.8 ft). Ping is often suggested to have said that fishermen in Nanjing caught a Chinese paddlefish with a length of 7 metres (23 ft) and a weight of 907 kilograms (2,000 lb). However, Grande and Bemis (1991) suggested that this enormous length may have been the result of a translation error. The last known specimen of the species, a mature female caught in 2003, was measured as being 3.63 metres (11.9 ft) in length with a body mass of approximately 200 kilograms (440 lb). A 1996 study estimated based on extrapolations from growth curves, that the largest female and male fish may have grown to lengths of 4.363 metres (14.31 ft) and 3.685 metres (12.09 ft) respectively. FishBase and World Wide Fund for Nature gives a conservative maximum weight of 300–500 kg (660–1,100 lb).

The lifespan has been estimated at 29–38 years, though the theoretical maximum lifespan is likely to have been significantly higher, as the estimate reflects anthropogenic impacts on the population.

== Taxonomy and evolutionary history ==
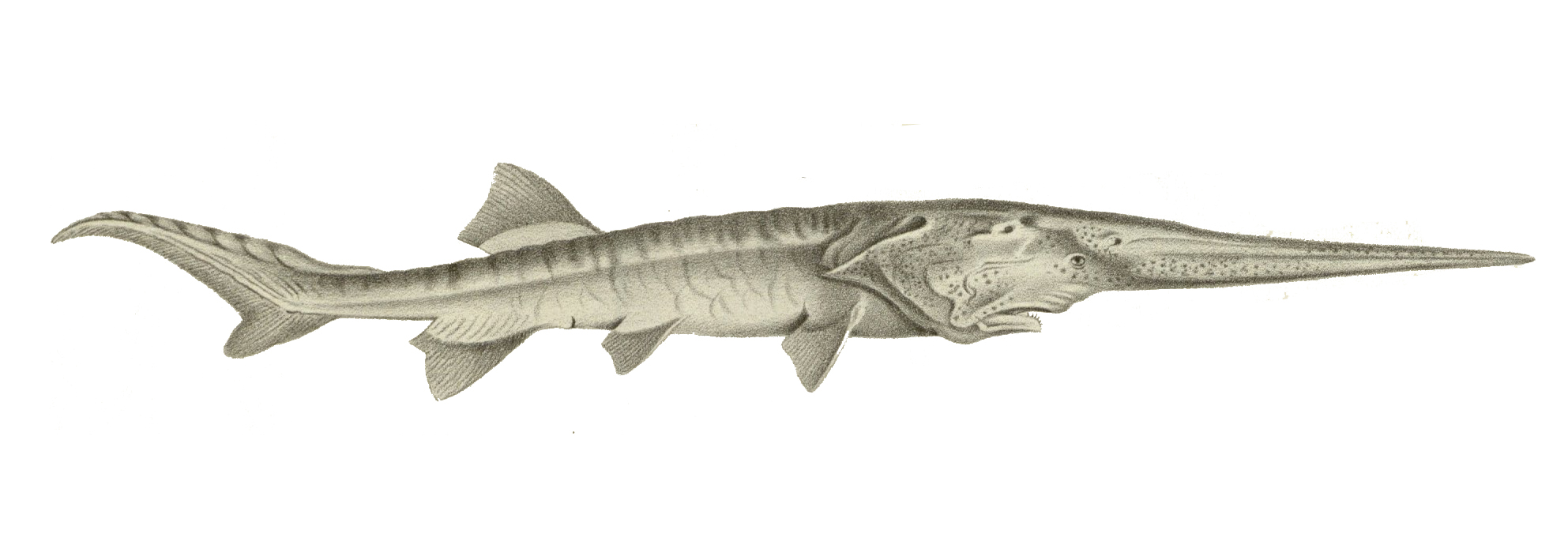
Scientific drawing of Psephurus gladius from 1868 (resource: Nouvelles Archives du Muséum national d'histoire naturelle)

The species was first named as a species of Polyodon (the genus of the American paddlefish) by Eduard von Martens in 1862. It was placed into a separate, monotypic genus by Albert Günther in 1873. The species was also given a different name, Spatularia angustifolium by Johann Jakob Kaup also in 1862, but this is considered a junior synonym of P. gladius.

Paddlefish (Polyodontidae) are one of two living families of Acipenseriformes alongside sturgeons (Acipenseridae). The oldest records of Acipenseriformes date to the Early Jurassic, over 190 million years ago. The oldest paddlefish fossil is that of Protopsephurus from the Early Cretaceous of China, dating to around 120 million years ago. The oldest representatives of the genus containing the American paddlefish, Polyodon date to around 65 million years ago, from the beginning of the Paleocene. Various molecular clock estimates have been given for the age of the divergence between the American and Chinese paddlefish, including 68 million years ago 72 million years ago, and 100 million years ago, all dating to the middle to Upper Cretaceous.

Relationships of recent and fossil paddlefish genera, after Grande et al. (2002).

- Polyodontidae
  - - † Protopsephurus
  - - - † Paleopsephurus
    - Polyodontinae
      - † Psephurus (Chinese paddlefish)
      - - † Crossopholis
        - Polyodon spathula (American paddlefish)

== Distribution, habitat and ecology ==
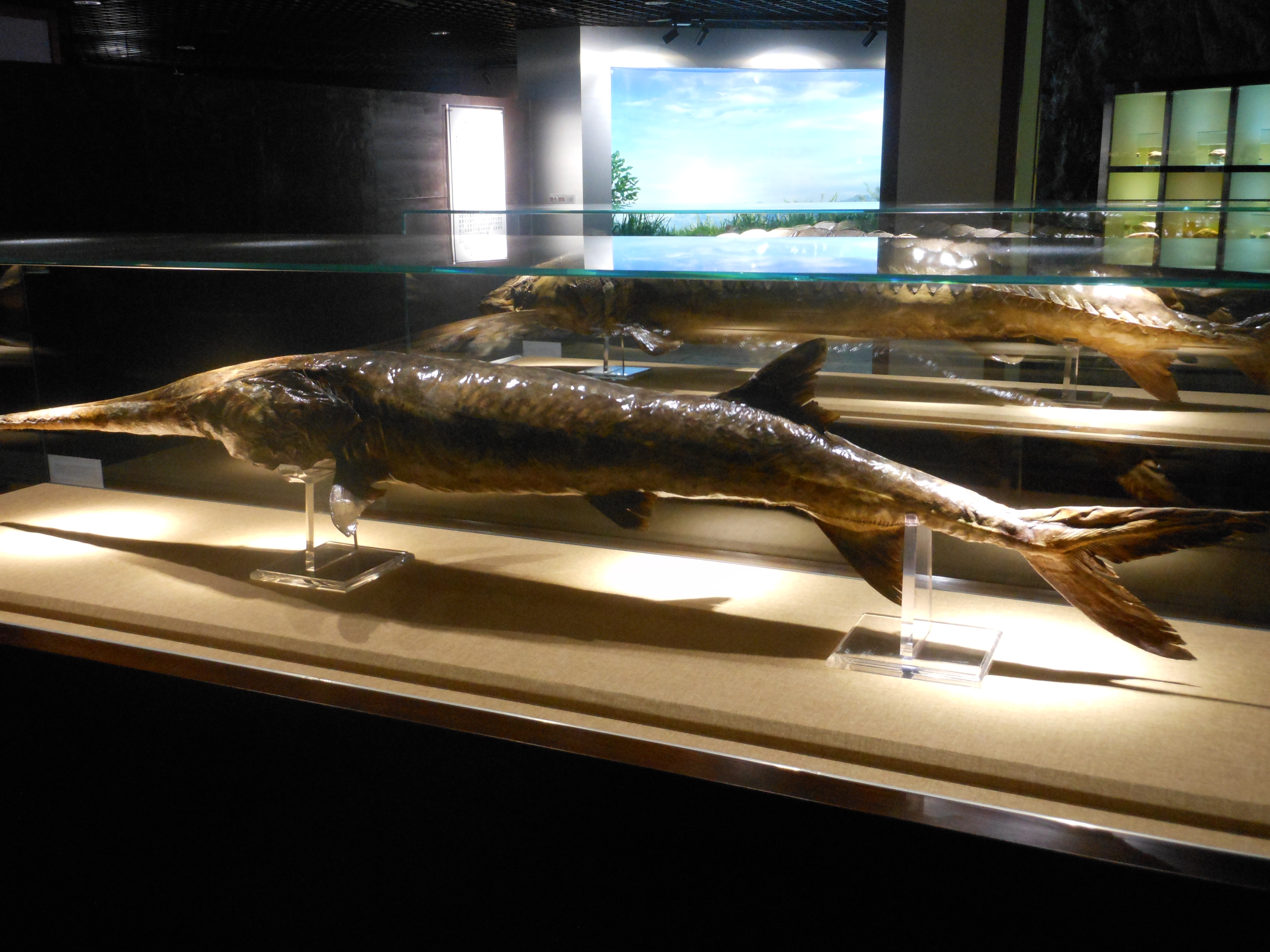
A specimen of Psephurus gladius exhibited in the Museum of Hydrobiological Sciences of Wuhan Institute of Hydrobiology

The Chinese paddlefish was native to the Yangtze (Chang Jiang) River basin and its estuary at the East China Sea. Historically it was also recorded in the Yellow River basin (which is connected to the Yangtze by the Grand Canal) and its estuary at the Yellow Sea. They were also historically found in coastal waters of the East China Sea and the Yellow Sea; occasionally spring tides would bring individuals into the lower reaches of the Qiantang and Yong rivers of Zhejiang province. It primarily inhabited the rivers, particularly in the case of the Yangtze the relatively more prey-rich lower-middle reaches as opposed to the relatively food-poor upper reaches, but sometimes travelled into large lakes.

During fall and winter, breeding-age adults migrated from the rest of the Yangtze river system to the lower Jinsha River (a name given to the upper part of the Yangtze) in the section of the river around the city of Yibin in southern Sichuan, to congregate for spawning, which occurred in spring of the following year, from mid-March to early April. Males and females are suggested to have reached sexual maturity and began spawning at 5 and 6 years of age respectively, with spawning males being reported as approximately 5–10 years of age, while spawning females were generally 6 to 16 years of age. One spawning site on the Jinsha River, located at the midpoint of the river, around 60 m (200 ft) from the riverbank, was around 500 m (1,600 ft) in length, and had a max water depth of 10 m (33 ft) and rapid water flow, with the bottom sediments in the lower reaches being shingly and in the upper reaches muddy/sandy. Females probably did not spawn every year, likely every other year or somewhat less frequently, like other members of Acipenseriformes. The ovaries of the female fish contained over 100,000 eggs, each approximately 2.7 mm (3/32 in) across, which had a sticky surface. Once the eggs had become fertilized, they sank and attached to pebbles on the river bottom.

The fish was amphidromous (migrating between freshwater and the sea for reasons other than spawning), with young juveniles migrating 2,750 kilometres (1,710 mi) downriver following their hatching in their spawning grounds in the upper Yangtze, reaching the Yangtze estuary in the vicinity of Shanghai by the time they were 4–5 months of age in July to August, following which they spent part of their life living in brackish and saline coastal waters. As subadults they later migrated back up into freshwater in the Yangtze at around 1.5–2 years old, following which they would progressively migrate upriver over the next 1–4 years until they reached close to their spawning grounds in the section of the Yangtze between Chongqing and Yibin.

Closeup of the tip of the rostrum, showing electrorecepting ampullae

The fish was largely solitary, and occupied the lower-mid layers of the water column. Chinese paddlefish were noted for being strong swimmers. Unlike its relative the American paddlefish, which is a planktivorous filter feeder, the Chinese paddlefish was primarily piscivorous, mainly feeding on small to medium-sized fishes like anchovies (Coilia), cyprinids (Coreius, Rhinogobio), gobies (Gobius) as well as bagrid catfish and bothid flounders. It also consumed crustaceans like shrimp and crabs. The jaws, unlike the American paddlefish but like sturgeons and fossil paddlefish, were capable of protrusion, a form of cranial kinesis allowing them to move relative to the rest of the skull, with the upper jaw being able to thrust downwards and forwards in order to seize prey. Paddlefish, like other Acipenseriformes and several other groups of vertebrates, engage in passive electroreception (the sensing of external electric fields) using structures called ampullae that form an extension of the lateral line system of sensory organs. Passive electroreception (where electric fields are sensed but not generated, as in electric fish) is primarily used for detecting the weak electric fields generated by prey. The head and rostrum of Chinese paddlefish, like those of other paddlefish, was densely packed with ampullae, indicating that enhancing electroreception was one of the rostrum's primary functions.

== Decline and extinction ==
The last records of Chinese paddlefish in the Yellow River basin and its estuary date back to the 1960s, although declines were realized between the 13th and 19th centuries. Declines were significant throughout its primary range in the Yangtze basin, but annual captures of 25 tonnes continued into the 1970s. A 2024 study estimated that the population of spawning age individuals of the fish was around 3,000 in 1980. In 1983, the Chinese government made fishing of the species illegal due to its decline in numbers. The species was still being found in small numbers in the 1980s (for example, 32 were caught in 1985), and young were seen as recently as 1995. Due to the rarity of the fish by the time it was realised that it was in peril, and the fact that the adult fish were difficult to keep in captivity, attempts to create a captive breeding stock failed.

Since 2000, there have been only two confirmed sightings of the fish alive, both from the Yangtze basin: The first was a 3.3-metre (10 ft 10 in), 117-kilogram (258 lb) female caught at Nanjing in 2002 and the second, initially reported as 3.52-metre (11 ft 7 in), 160 kg (350 lb) female accidentally caught at Yibin, Sichuan, on January 24, 2003, by fisherman Liu Longhua (刘龙华); the former died despite attempts to save it and the latter was radio-tagged and released, but the tag stopped working after only 12 hours.

During a search conducted in the Yangtze basin from 2006 to 2008, a research team from the Chinese Academy of Fisheries Science in Jingzhou failed to catch any paddlefish, but two possible specimens were recorded with hydroacoustic signals. A comprehensive study published in 2019, including scientists from the Yangtze River Fisheries Research Institute, found that the species was certainly extinct, based on its absence from extensive capture surveys of the Yangtze between 2017 and 2018. The paper estimated that the species went extinct between 2005 and 2010, but became functionally extinct by 1993. The paper thus recommended the reclassification of the species as Extinct by the IUCN. A similar recommendation was also made by the Species Survival Commission Sturgeon Specialist Group of the IUCN in September 2019. The official IUCN status of the species was formally updated to "extinct" in July 2022.

The primary cause of its extinction was the construction of the Gezhouba Dam, which became operational 1981, which a 2024 study described as having "sealed its fate of inevitable extinction" upon becoming operational because it effectively prevented the fish from properly completing its life cycle, dividing the fish population into subadults downstream of the dam who could not migrate upriver through the dams turbines to reproduce, and a residual adult population upstream of the dam who could continue to spawn but not effectively replace itself over the long term. Overfishing also played a role in its decline. The Chinese paddlefish was heavily overfished in all stages of growth from fry (which were easily captured by traditional fishing methods) to adult, which combined with the long generation time due to its slow maturation led to reduced sustainability of viable populations.

== Cultural significance ==
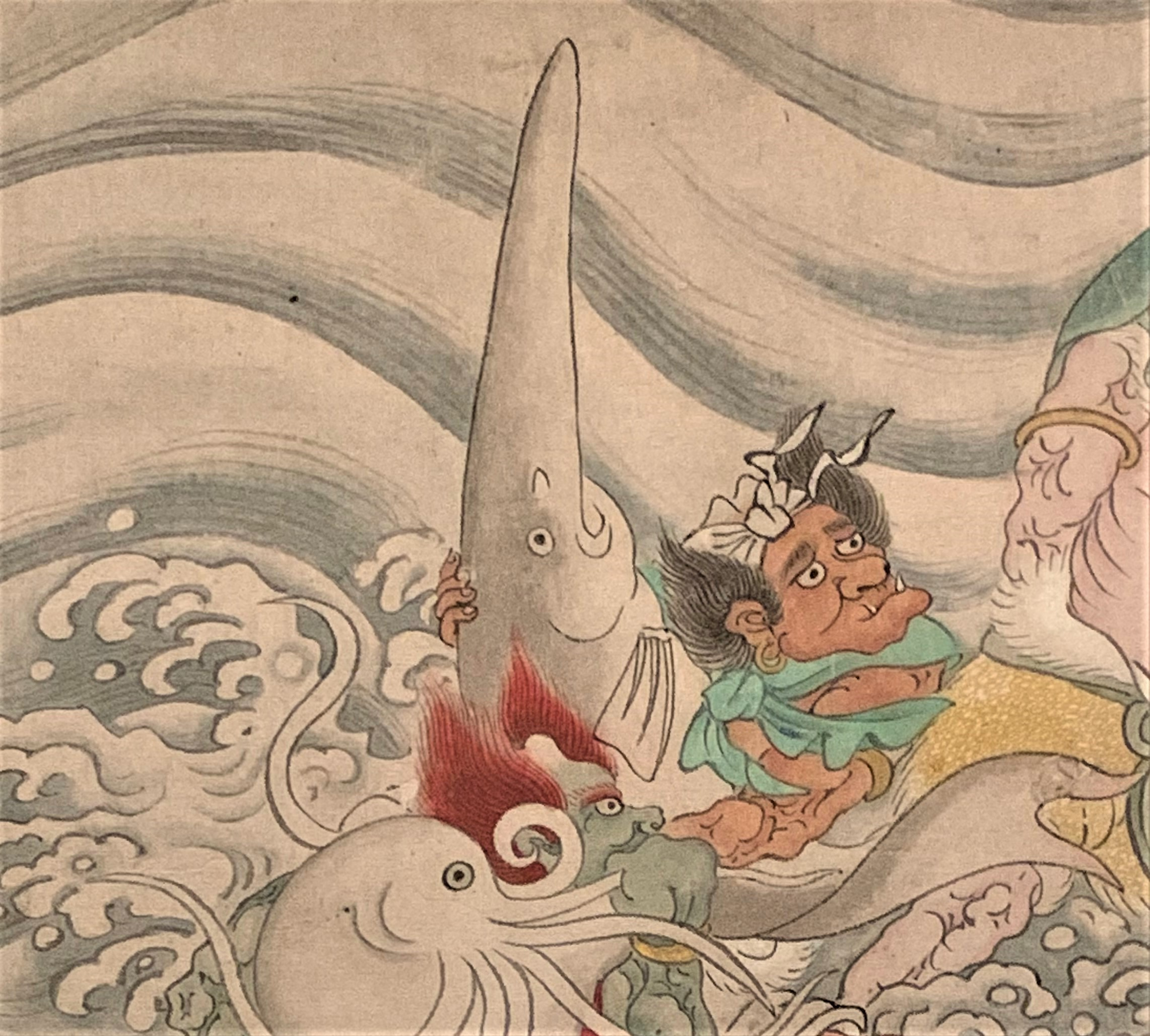
Depiction in the 17th-century work Searching the Mountains for Demons by Zheng Zhong

A gold belt from the Jinsha site in Sichuan, dating to around 1000 BC, has been found emblazoned with drawings of what is suggested to be Chinese paddlefish. The Classic of Poetry (11th to 7th century BC) may contain references to the Chinese paddlefish as one of the animals sacrificed during rituals. The Huainanzi (2nd century BC) claims that the fish was receptive to rhythm and attracted to the sound of musical instruments. The Eastern Jin writer Guo Pu apparently mentions the fish in his work Jiang Fu (江賦, lit. Ode to the River). The 9th century Tang dynasty book Miscellaneous Morsels from Youyang suggests that killing a Chinese paddlefish could cause rain. The fish is depicted in a number of historical Chinese paintings. Sichuanese fishermen had a saying regarding the fish, referencing its large size. Some common names for the fish in Chinese compare the rostrum of the fish to an elephant's trunk.

Like the related sturgeons and American paddlefish, the species was fished for its caviar, though it made up only a small proportion (less than 1%) of the total number of fish caught from the Yangtze in the late 20th century by weight.

== See also ==
- Baiji – a critically endangered, possibly extinct species of river dolphin also native to the Yangtze, whose decline was driven by the same factors that drove the Chinese paddlefish to extinction
- List of endangered and protected species of China
