= Tanis (musician) =

Tanis Chalopin
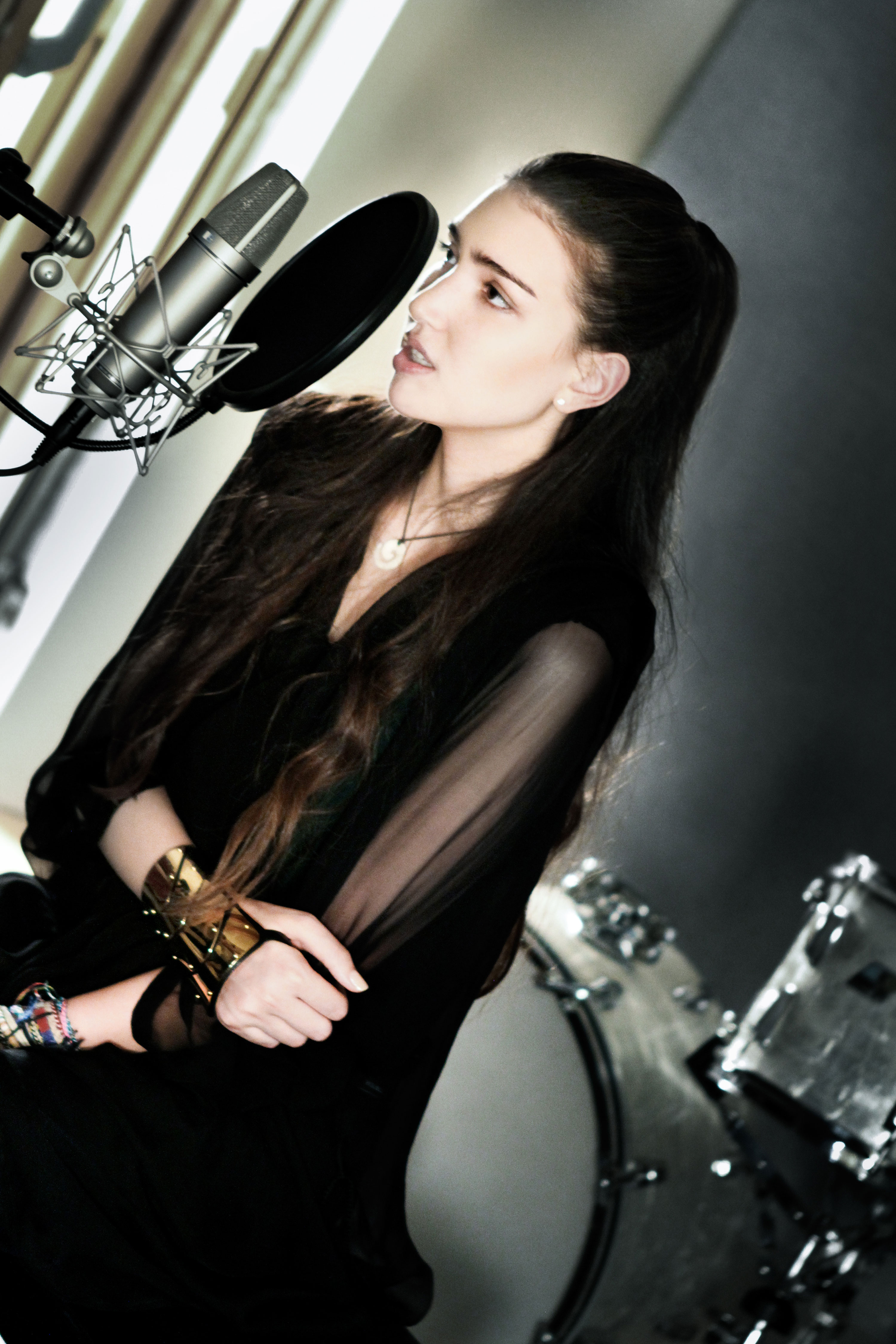
- Born: Neuilly-sur-Seine, France
- Citizenship: France, Bahamas
- Occupations: Singer, songwriter, composer, and musician
- Father: Jean Chalopin

Tanis Chalopin is a French-Singaporean and Bahamian singer, songwriter, composer, and musician.

== Early life ==
Tanis was born in Neuilly-sur-Seine, France, to French producer and writer Jean Chalopin and Singaporean former model Ethel Fong. She has one brother, Janvier.

Tanis grew up between France and the Caribbean. She began to learn the piano at the age of five and also plays cello, guitar and drums. She first gained recognition when, at the age of 14, she wrote the theme to the Disney Asia movie Trail of the Panda. Tanis went on to study at the New York University Steinhardt School Department of Music and Performing Arts.

In September 2016 Tanis gave a TED talk on visualizing music for TEDxBeaconStreet.

== Career ==
Tanis launched her career as a singer songwriter in 2015 with the single "Ce n'est pas moi": the song features on the soundtrack of the 2017 film Thoroughbreds

The 2016 single "Blackout", from the EP of the same name, saw three separate versions (English, French and remix) each achieve over half a million views within the first month of release. The single was remixed by French DJ and musician The Toxic Avenger.

In 2017, Tanis composed and produced the music for the C4 production short film Killing Hope. In 2023, Tanis composed an original soundtrack for the new Inspector Gadget video game, "Inspector Gadget:MAD Time Party". In 2024, Tanis composed the music for a viral short film shot entirely underwater called "The Deepest Dance", directed by André Musgrove and featuring dancer Ariadna Hafez.

Tanis composed the piece "Twin Flame" as a commission requested by Princess Eugenie to gift to her husband Jack Brooksbank. It was performed by the Royal Philharmonic Orchestra at their wedding in 2018.

== Discography ==
- Ce n'est pas moi, 2015.
- Would Be You, 2019
- Livewire, 2020
- Grow, 2021.
- Priority, 2025
- Kid, 2025
