= Dawne McCance =

Canadian academic

- Born: June 2, 1944 (age 82)

Academic background
- Education: University of Manitoba (BSc, MA, PhD)
- Thesis: Limits of Burden: Toward an Ethical Framework for Prenatal Diagnosis (1986)
- Academic advisor: Klaus Klostermaier

Academic work
- Discipline: Derrida studies
- Sub-discipline: Critical animal studies
- Institutions: University of Manitoba

Dawne C. McCance FRSC (born 1944) is a distinguished professor at the University of Manitoba. In 2019, she was elected a Fellow of the Royal Society of Canada.

== Career ==
McCance joined the faculty of Religious Studies at her alma mater, the University of Manitoba, in 1986. She soon edited Life Ethics in World Religions and Unions and published Medusa's Ear and Posts: Re-Addressing the Ethical. Her 1996 book Posts: Re-Addressing the Ethical addressed the "significance of postmodern discourses on the ethical and the ethical significance of postmodern discourses in general."

By 2007, McCance was promoted to Distinguished Professor of Arts and Religion. Later, as a fellow at the Oxford Centre for Animal Ethics, McCance published Critical Animal Studies: An Introduction through the State University of New York Press. This book focused on issues concerning the fledgling discipline of "Animal Studies" which include questions regarding animal rights, animal experimentation and farming, posthumanist challenges to traditional ethical discourse, and the role fiction, visual art, and architecture have on humans compassion towards animals. She was Editor of Mosaic: An Interdisciplinary Critical Journal for eighteen years .

In 2019, she was elected a Fellow of the Royal Society of Canada and published The Reproduction of Life Death: Derrida’s La vie la mort.
