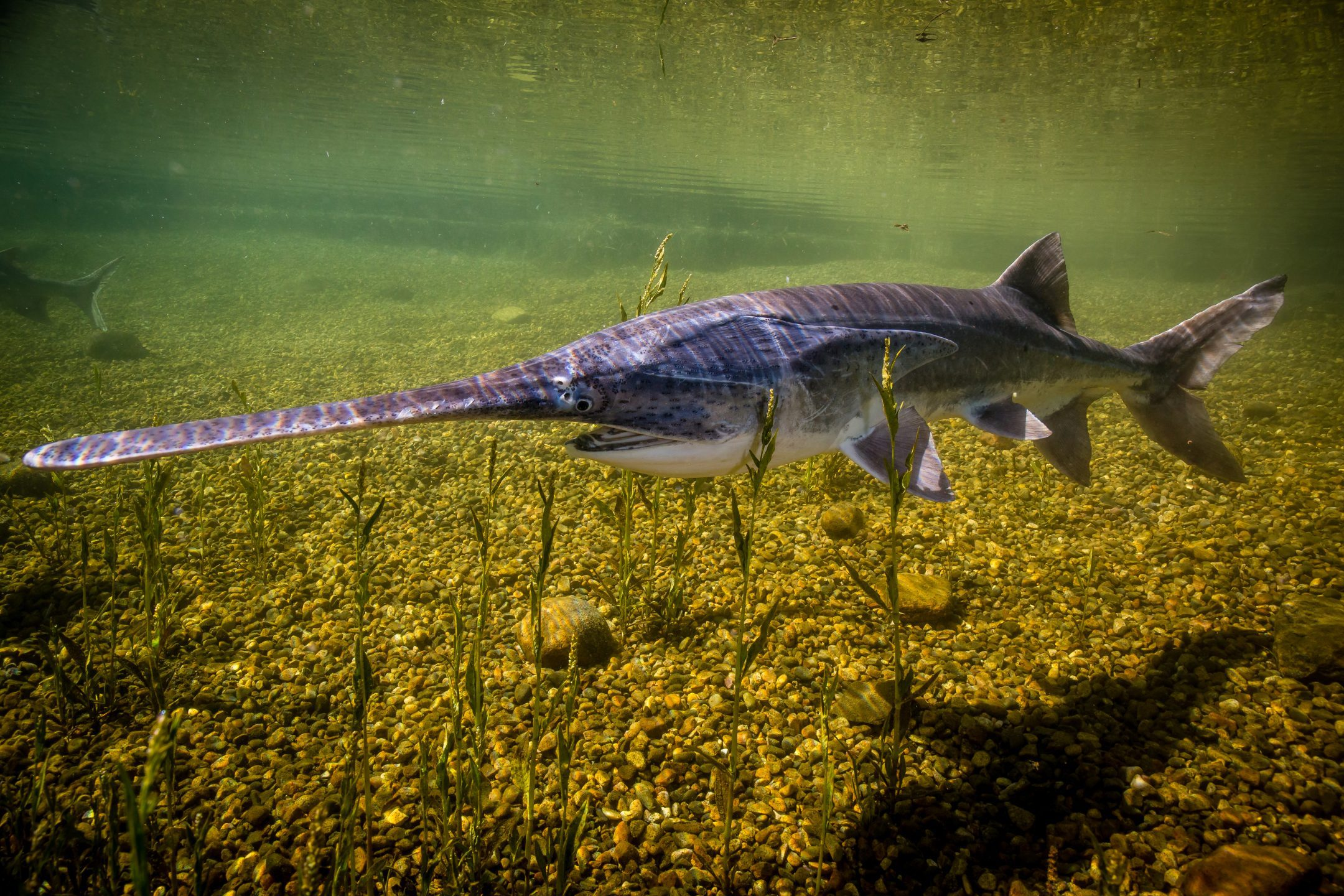
- American paddlefish, Polyodon spathula
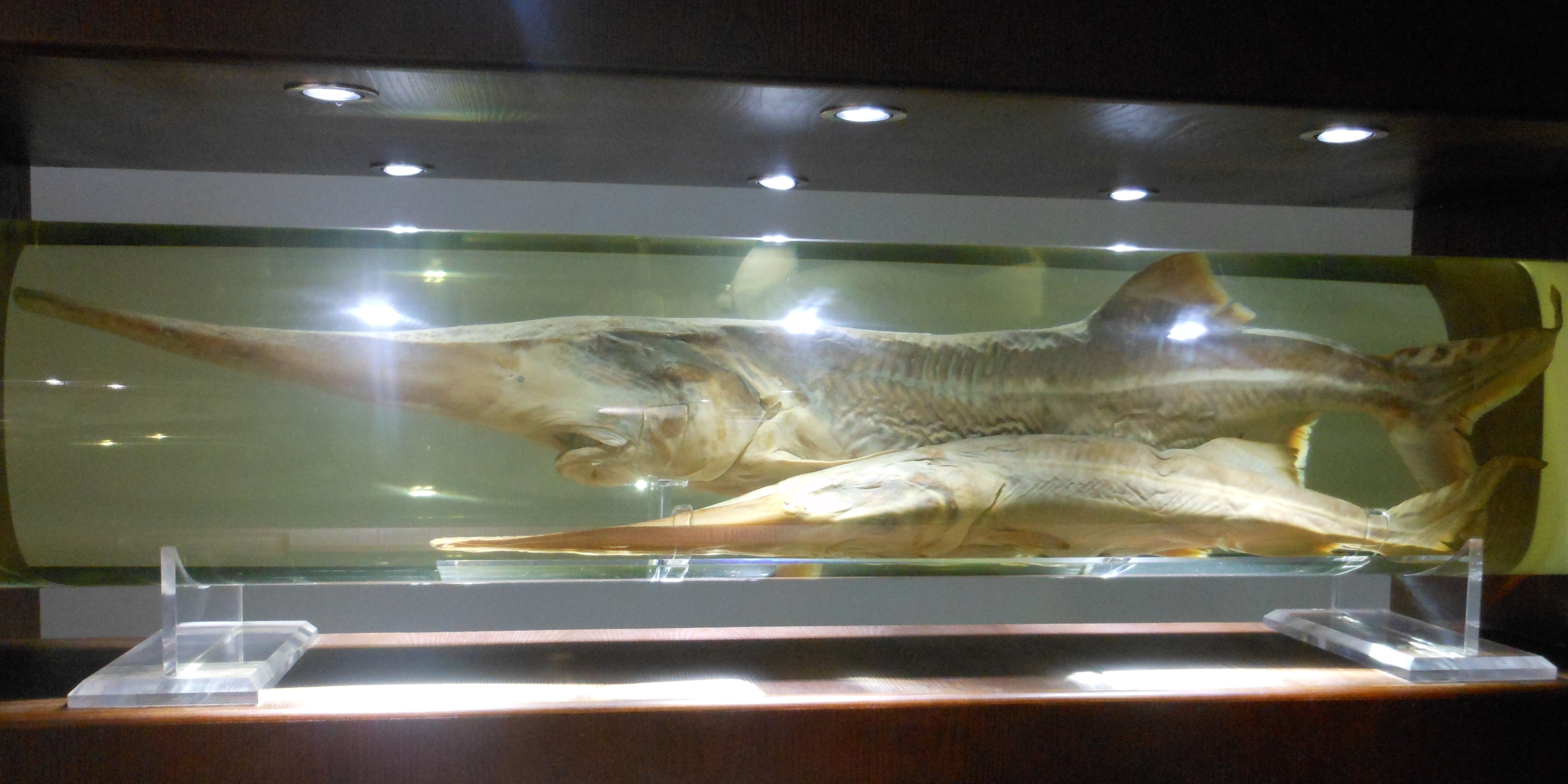
- Chinese paddlefish, † Psephurus gladius

Scientific classification
- Kingdom: Animalia
- Phylum: Chordata
- Class: Actinopterygii
- Order: Acipenseriformes
- Suborder: Acipenseroidei
- Family: Polyodontidae; Bonaparte, 1838

Genera
- Recent genera: Polyodon; †Psephurus; Fossil genera: †Crossopholis; †Paleopsephurus; †Parapsephurus; †Protopsephurus; †Pugiopsephurus

= Paddlefish =

Paddlefishes Temporal range: Early Cretaceous (Barremian)-Present 125–0 Ma

Family of fishes related to sturgeons

Paddlefish are members of the ray-finned fish family Polyodontidae, which belong to the basal order Acipenseriformes, one of two living groups within this order alongside sturgeons (Acipenseridae). Their most distinctive feature is an elongated rostrum that enhances electroreception, allowing them to detect prey in murky water. Both recent and fossil paddlefish occur exclusively in North America and Eastern Asia.

Eight species are known, six of which are prehistoric and only known from fossils—five from North America and one from China. Of the two species to have survived until modern times, the American paddlefish (Polyodon spathula) inhabits the Mississippi River basin in the United States, while the now extinct Chinese paddlefish (Psephurus gladius, also known as the "Chinese swordfish") inhabited the Yangtze and Yellow River basins in China. The earliest known paddlefish fossil, Protopsephurus, dates to approximately 120 million years ago during the Early Cretaceous epoch in China.

Throughout their historic range, paddlefish populations have declined dramatically due to overfishing, pollution, and human development. Dam construction has proven particularly destructive, blocking seasonal migrations to ancestral spawning grounds. River alterations have changed natural flow patterns, destroying spawning habitat and nursery areas critical to population survival. The Chinese paddlefish was officially declared extinct by the IUCN in 2022 following a 2019 recommendation that failed to find any Chinese paddlefish following extensive capture surveys. The last confirmed sighting of a Chinese paddlefish occurred in the Yangtze River Basin in 2003.

== Morphology ==
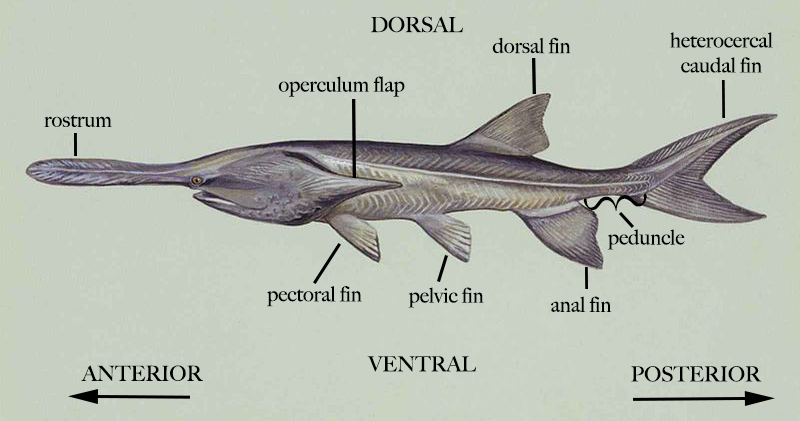
General morphology of paddlefish

Paddlefish are among the few extant organisms known to retain a notochord beyond the embryonic stage. Their bodies contain very few bones, consisting primarily of cartilage with the notochord serving as a flexible spine. Both species share several morphological features: a spindle-shaped body with smooth, scaleless skin, a heterocercal tail, and small, poorly developed eyes.

=== Size ===
Size of recent and fossil paddlefish compared to a human. Scale bar = 1 m (3.3 ft)

The earliest known paddlefish, Protopsephurus, is much smaller than both recent species, reaching a maximum length of only 77 centimetres (30 in). Chinese paddlefish are the largest known paddlefish. It is often stated that the largest Chinese paddlefish measured 23 ft (7.0 m) in length and was estimated to weigh several thousand pounds. However, this considerable length, reported by John Treadwell Nichols in 1943 as originating from a Chinese language publication by C. Ping in 1931, may be the result of a translation error. The last known individual of the species, a female caught in 2003, was one of the largest recorded individuals, measured to be 3.63 metres (11.9 ft) long, with a body mass of approximately 200 kilograms (440 lb).

Though the American paddlefish ranks among the largest freshwater fishes in North America, it falls short of its Chinese cousin's impressive dimensions. American paddlefish commonly exceed 5 ft (1.5 m) in length and 60 lb (27 kg) in weight. The largest specimen on record was speared in 1916 in Okoboji Lake, Iowa. (Note: "Okoboji Lake" could refer to either of two attached lakes: West Okoboji Lake and East Okoboji Lake. The source does not state which one is meant.) This fish measured 7 ft 1 in (2.16 m) long with a girth of 45.5 in (1.16 m). According to a 1969 report by J.R. Harlan and E.B. Speaker in Iowa Fish and Fishing, it weighed over 198 lb (90 kg).

=== Rostrum and electroreception ===
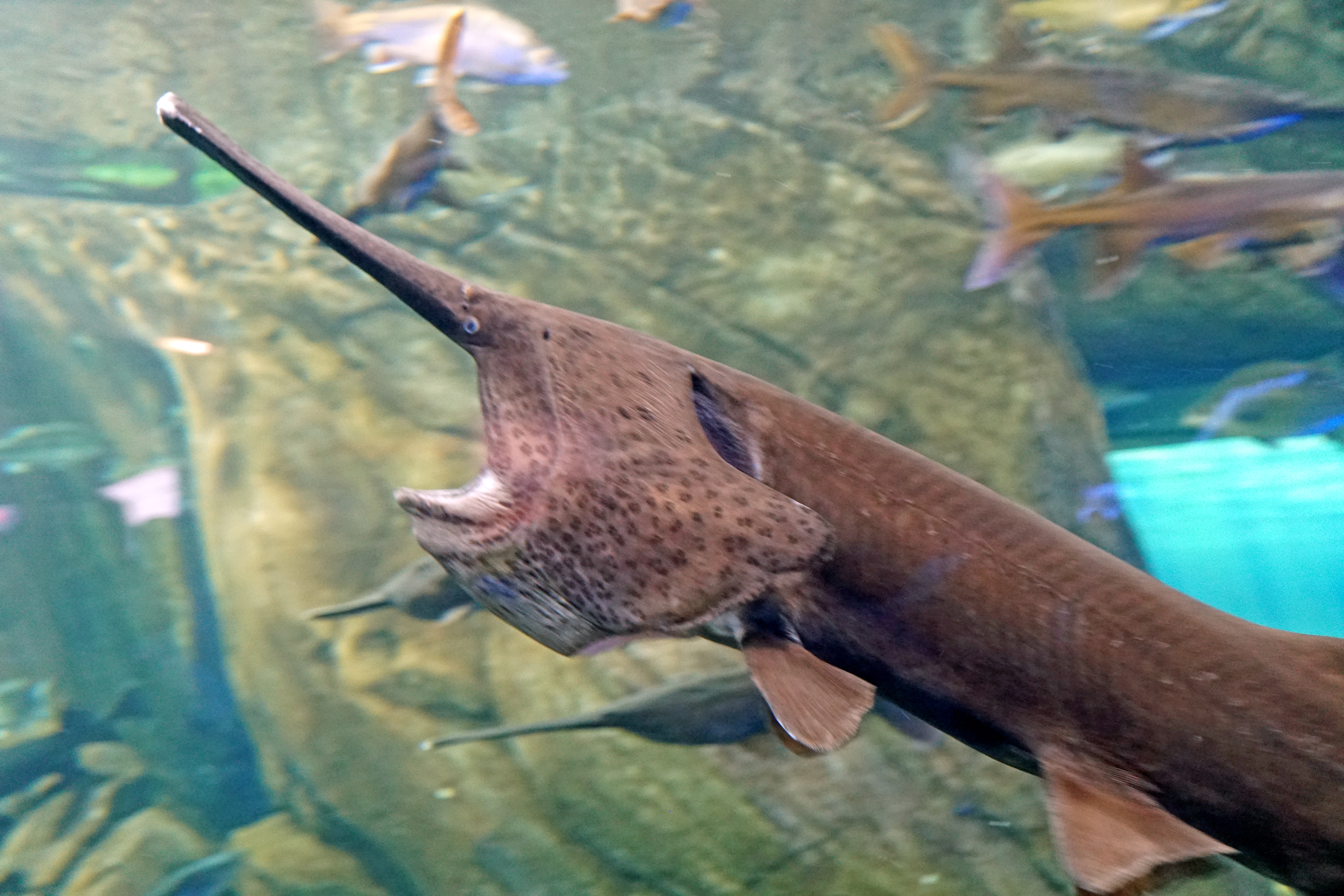
Closeup of the head of an American paddlefish, showing the presence of electrorecepting organs (ampullae of Lorenzini)

The shape of the rostrum (elongated snout or "paddle") varies dramatically between the species; the Chinese paddlefish possessed a narrow, sword-like rostrum, while the American paddlefish has a broad, paddle-shaped one. During early development from embryo to fry, paddlefish lack their rostrum, which begins forming shortly after hatching.

Scientists initially believed paddlefish used their rostrums to dig through bottom sediments, but electron microscopy revealed a different purpose entirely; the rostrum's surface is covered with electroreceptors called ampullae. These ampullae concentrate densely within star-shaped bony projections that branch from the rostrum's bony core. These electroreceptors detect weak electrical fields that signal prey presence in the water column. Remarkably, they can sense not just zooplankton—the primary food source for American paddlefish—but the individual feeding and swimming movements of zooplankton appendages.

Some sources incorrectly suggest that rostrum damage would severely impair a paddlefish's ability to feed and maintain health, but laboratory experiments and field research demonstrate otherwise; even paddlefish with damaged or severed rostrums can forage effectively. Given their poorly developed eyes, paddlefish rely heavily on electroreception for foraging, though the rostrum is not their only sensory tool: sensory pores cover nearly half the skin surface, extending from the rostrum across the top of the head down to the tips of the operculum (gill flaps).

=== Feeding strategies ===
The two species employed vastly different feeding strategies. Unlike its filter-feeding American relative, the Chinese paddlefish was a piscivore—a highly predatory fish. Its forward-pointing jaws suggest it hunted primarily for small fish in the water column, supplementing its diet with shrimp, benthic fishes, and crabs. In contrast, the American paddlefish jaw is specialized for filter feeding; as ram suspension filter feeders, they consume primarily zooplankton, occasionally taking small aquatic insects, insect larvae, and small fish. Fossil non-Polyodon paddlefish are thought to have had a similar ecology to the Chinese paddlefish as primarily piscivorous predators.

== Distribution and habitat ==
=== American paddlefish ===
American paddlefish are native to the Mississippi River basin, ranging from New York to Montana and south to the Gulf of Mexico. They inhabit several Gulf Slope drainages, favoring medium to large rivers with long, deep pools that move slowly, along with backwater lakes and bayous. In Texas, paddlefish historically occurred in the Angelina River, Big Cypress Bayou, Neches River, tributaries of the Red River, Sabine River, San Jacinto River, Sulphur River, and Trinity River.

Their historical range once extended into Canada—specifically Lake Huron and Lake Helen—and across 26 to 27 U.S. states. American paddlefish have been extirpated from much of their northern peripheral range, including the Great Lakes and populations in New York, Maryland, Pennsylvania, and Canada. The Ontario Ministry of Natural Resources now lists paddlefish as extirpated from Ontario, Canada under their Endangered Species Act. The IUCN Red List designates Canadian populations as extirpated, noting the last Canadian records date to the early 1900s and the species' presence there was marginal.

Overall, the American paddlefish is classified as vulnerable (VU) on the IUCN Red List. International trade has been restricted since June 1992 under Appendix II of the Convention of International Trade in Endangered Species of Wild Flora and Fauna (CITES). Concerns about remaining populations continue to grow across other states.

=== Chinese paddlefish ===
The Chinese paddlefish was considered anadromous, migrating upstream to spawn, though little is known about their migration patterns or population structure. They were endemic to the Yangtze River Basin in China, living primarily in the broad main stem rivers and shoal zones along the East China Sea. Research suggests they favored the middle and lower layers of the water column and occasionally entered large lakes.

With no confirmed sightings since 2003, the species was declared extinct in 2019. Past attempts at artificial propagation for restoration failed because captive specimens could not be kept alive.

== Life cycle ==
Paddlefish are long-lived and reach sexual maturity late in life; females do not begin spawning until they reach six to twelve years of age, some not until sixteen to eighteen years old. Males begin spawning around four to seven years of age, with some waiting until nine or ten years.

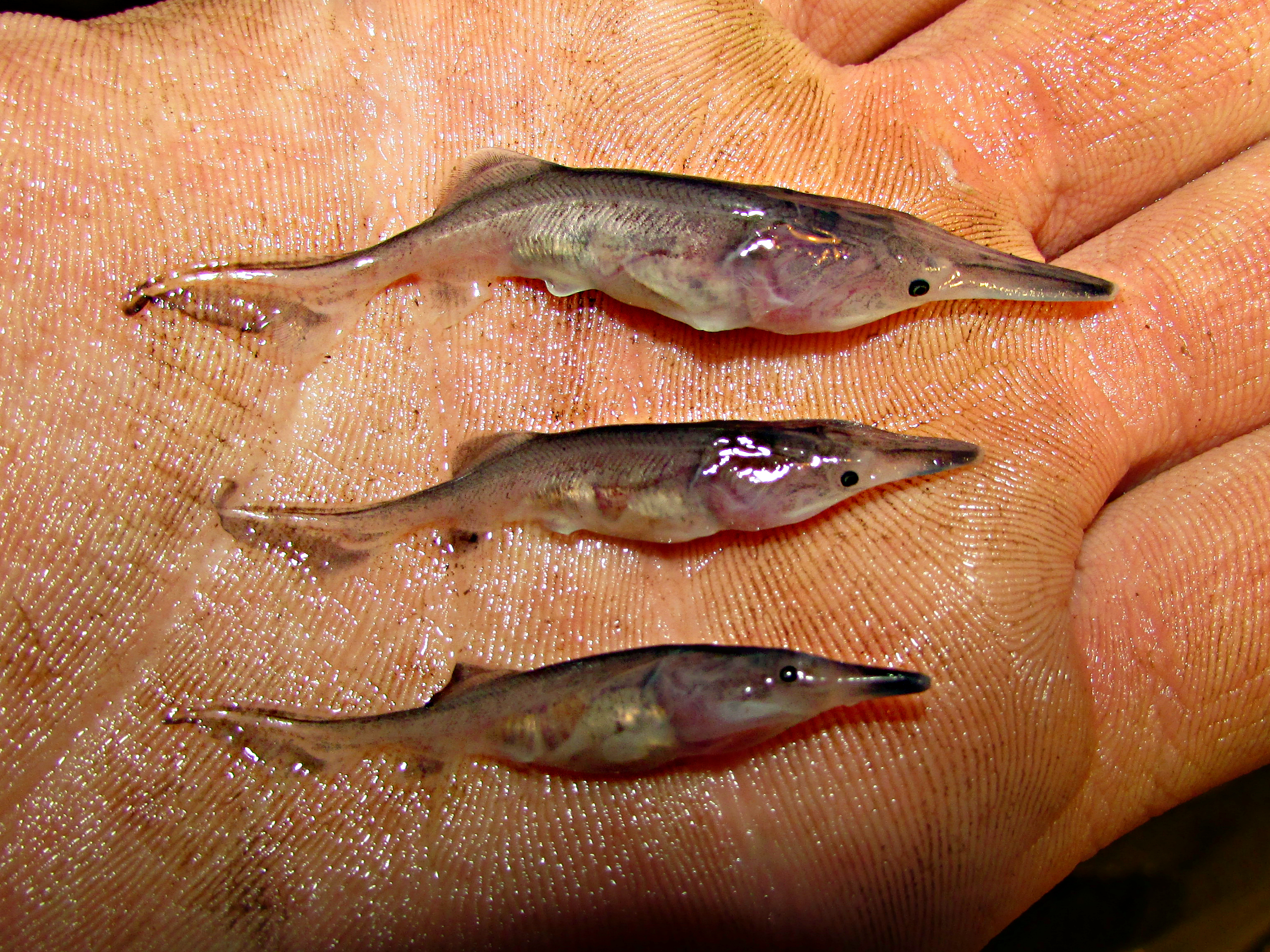
30-day-old fry of the American paddlefish

Spawning occurs in late spring only when specific environmental conditions align: appropriate water flow, temperature, photoperiod, and the presence of suitable gravel substrates. If any condition is absent, paddlefish will not spawn that year. Females spawn every second or third year, while males spawn more frequently—typically annually or every other year.

To spawn, paddlefish migrate upstream, seeking silt-free gravel bars. During normal conditions, these bars would be exposed to air or covered by very shallow water, but spring snowmelt and rainfall raise river levels sufficiently to submerge them. Paddlefish are broadcast spawners, also known as mass or synchronous spawners, with fertilization occurring externally: gravid females release their eggs over bare rocks or gravel while males simultaneously release sperm. The adhesive eggs stick to the rocky substrate. After hatching, young paddlefish are swept downstream by the river's flow, growing to adulthood in deep freshwater pools.

== Aquaculture ==
Advances in biotechnology have significantly improved paddlefish propagation and captive rearing. Success rates for reproduction, adaptation, and survival of cultured paddlefish have increased substantially, benefiting both broodstock development and stock rehabilitation programs. These improvements have enabled successful reservoir ranching and pond rearing, generating growing interest in the global market for paddlefish polyculture.

In the early 1970s, a cooperative scientific effort between the U.S. Fish & Wildlife Service and its USSR counterpart brought American paddlefish to the former Soviet Union for aquaculture. The program began with five thousand hatched larvae from Missouri hatcheries. These fish were introduced into several European and Asian rivers, establishing the first brood stock that successfully reproduced in 1984–1986 in Russia. Paddlefish are now raised in Germany, Austria, the Czech Republic, and the Plovdiv and Vidin regions in Bulgaria. Reproduction was successful in 1988 and 1989, resulting in the exportation of juvenile paddlefish to Romania and Hungary. In May 2006, specimens of various sizes and weights were caught by professional fishermen near Prahovo in the Serbian part of the Danube River.

In 1988, fertilized paddlefish eggs and larvae from Missouri hatcheries were first introduced into China. Since that time, China imports approximately 4.5 million fertilized eggs and larvae annually from hatcheries in Russia and the United States. Some paddlefish are polycultured in carp ponds and sold to restaurants, while others are cultured for brood stock and caviar production. China has also exported paddlefish to Cuba, where they are farmed for caviar production.

== Classification and evolution ==
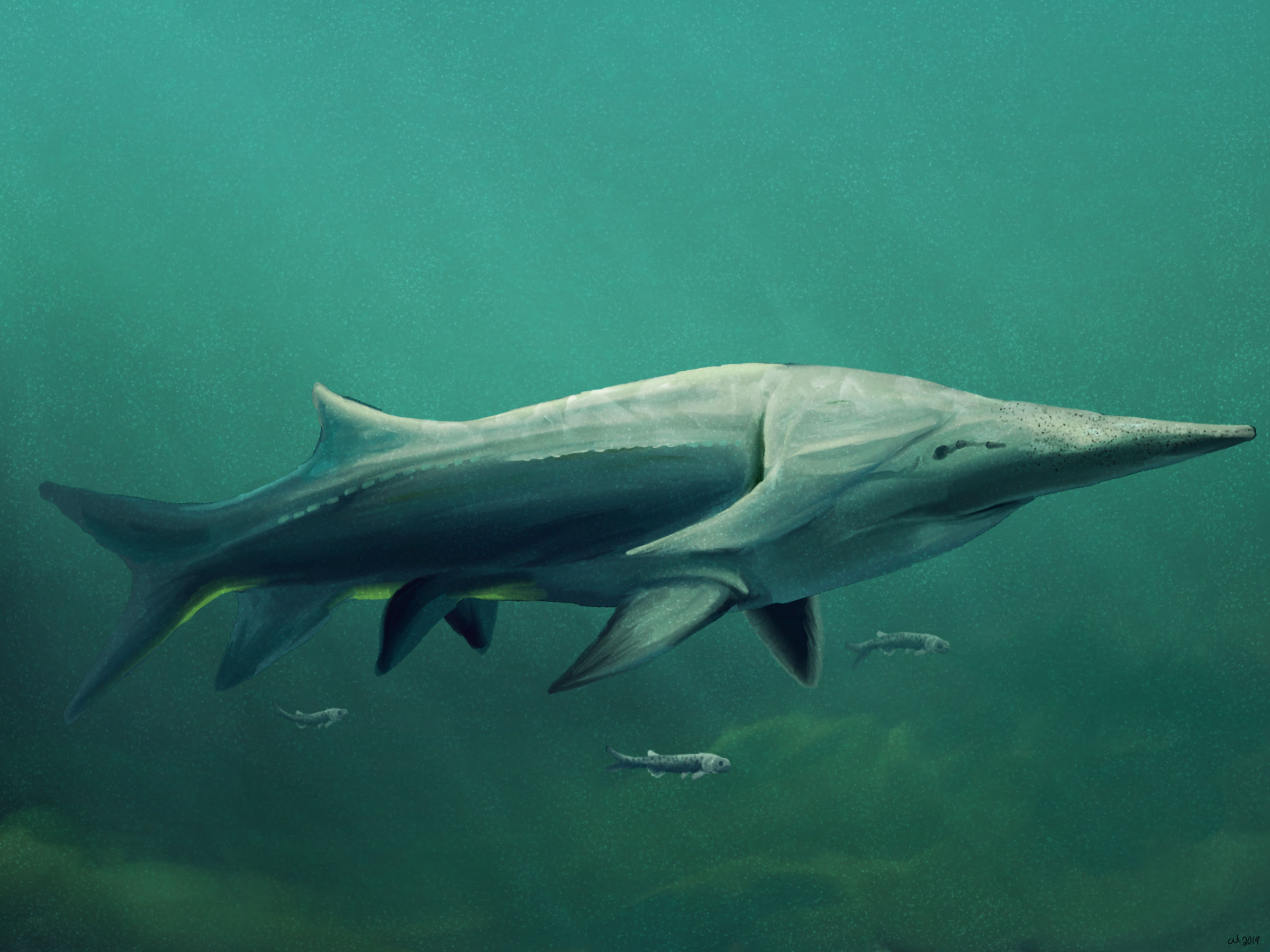
Restoration of the Cretaceous †Protopsephurus

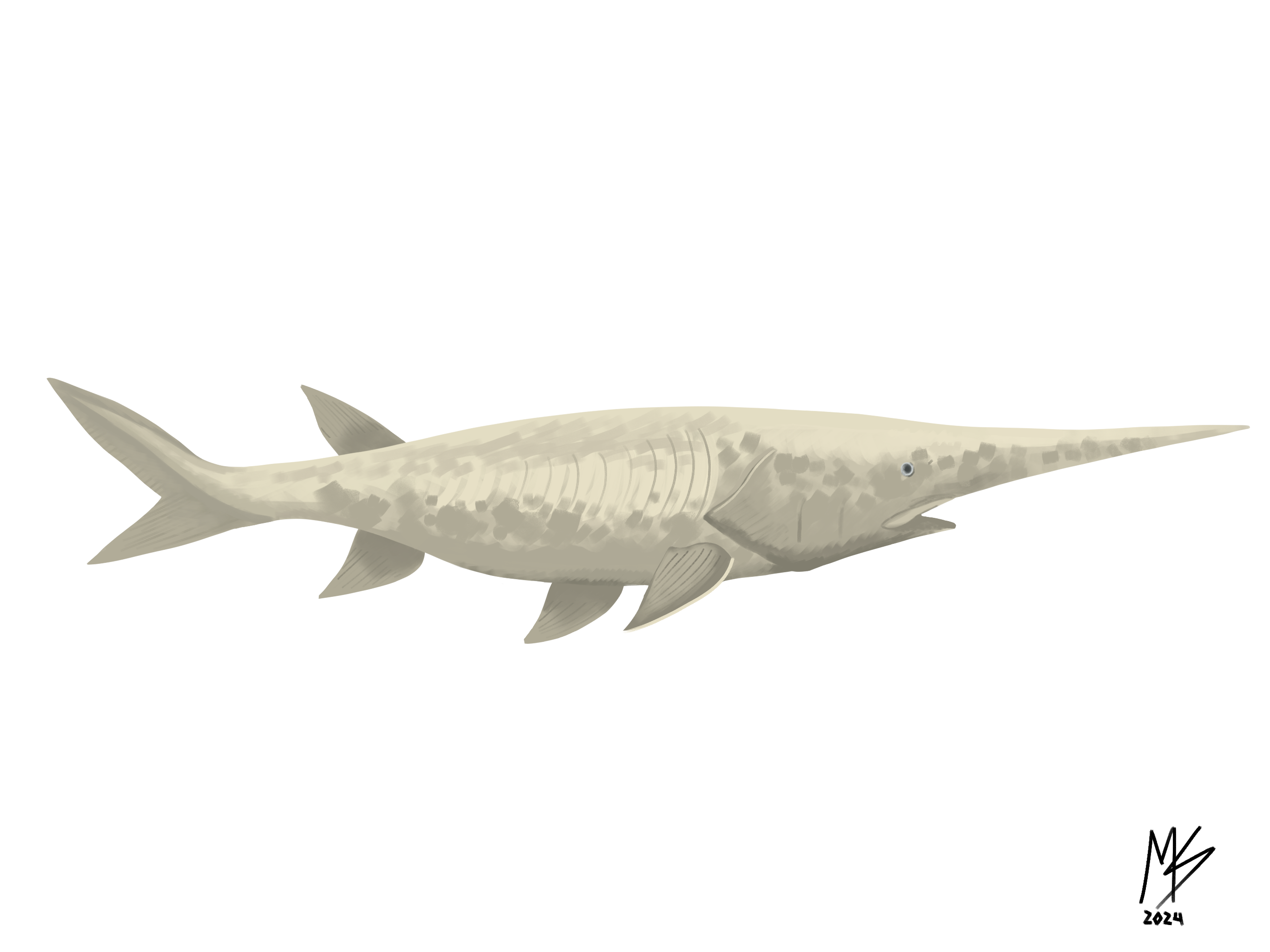
Restoration of †Crossopholis

There is one currently extant genus in this family, one recently extinct genus, and five extinct genera known exclusively from fossils.

Classification following Grande & Bemis (1991), with Parapsephurus and Pugiopsephurus added in Hilton et al. (2023):

- genus † Protopsephurus Lu, 1994 (Early Cretaceous, China)
  - species † Protopsephurus liui Lu, 1994
- genus † Pugiopsephurus Hilton et al., 2023 (Late Cretaceous, North America) (Incertae sedis)
  - species † Pugiopsephurus inundatus Hilton et al., 2023
- clade Polyodonti
  - genus † Paleopsephurus MacAlpin, 1947 (Late Cretaceous, North America)
    - species † Paleopsephurus wilsoni MacAlpin, 1947
  - genus †Parapsephurus Hilton et al., 2023 (Late Cretaceous, North America)
    - species † Parapsephurus willybemisi Hilton et al., 2023
  - subfamily Polyodontinae
    - genus † Psephurus Günther, 1873
      - †Psephurus gladius E. von Martens, 1862 Chinese paddlefish (extinct c. 2003)
    - tribe Polyodontini
      - genus † Crossopholis Cope, 1883 (Paleogene, North America)
        - species † Crossopholis magnicaudatus Cope, 1883
      - genus Polyodon Lacépède, 1797 (Paleocene-Recent, North America)
        - Polyodon spathula Walbaum, 1792 American paddlefish
        - † Polyodon tuberculata Grande & Bemis, 1991

=== Evolution ===
The ancestors of Acipenseriformes are thought to have split from those of other living fish around the Carboniferous period (360–300 million years ago). The oldest unambiguous members of Acipenseriformes are known from the Early Jurassic 201–175 million years ago. The ancestors of sturgeons and paddlefish are suggested to have diverged from each other by at least the Late Jurassic, around 155 million years ago. Protopsephurus from the Early Cretaceous of China, around 120 million years ago, represents the oldest known paddlefish. Some authors have reported remains of paddlefish from the Early Cretaceous of Mongolia and the Transbaikalia region of southeastern Siberia (with remains from Transbaikalia assigned to the nomen nudum "Alexandrichthys shishkini"). Fragmentary remains of paddlefish have also been reported from the late Early Cretaceous and early Late Cretaceous (Bissekty Formation) of Uzbekistan, assigned to the species Hesperopsephurus kyatensis and Psephuroides kazakhorum respectively. The earliest record of paddlefish in North America dates to the Santonian stage of the Late Cretaceous, around 85.7-83.6 million years ago.

Relationships of the genera are from Grande et al. (2002).

- Polyodontidae
  - - † Protopsephurus
  - - - † Paleopsephurus
    - Polyodontinae
      - † Psephurus (Chinese paddlefish)
      - - † Crossopholis
        - Polyodon
          - †Polyodon tuberculata
          - Polyodon spathula (American paddlefish)
