= Hybrid (biology) =

Offspring of cross-species reproduction

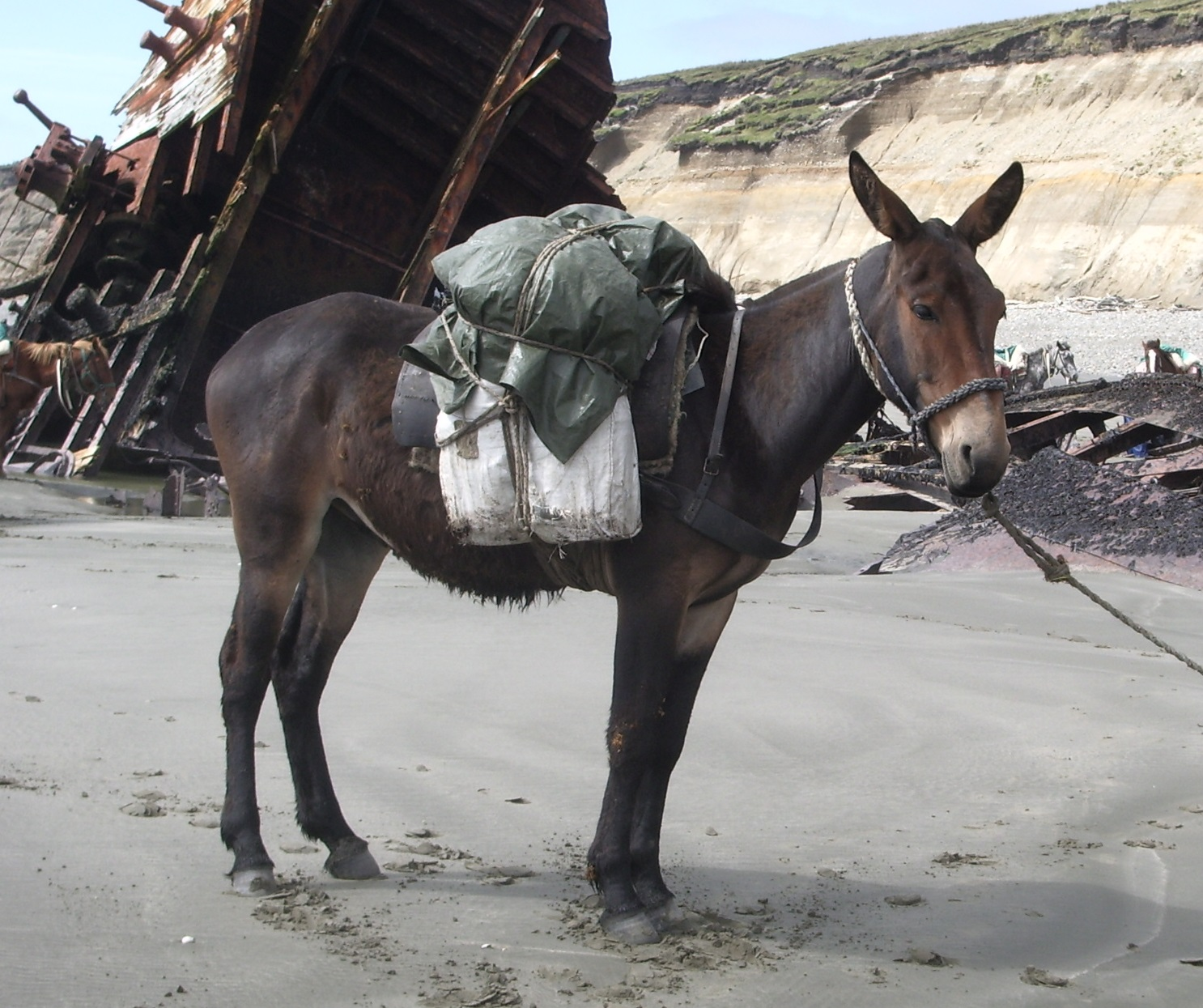
A mule is a sterile hybrid of a male donkey and a female horse. Mules are smaller than horses but stronger than donkeys, making them useful as pack animals.

In biology, a hybrid is the offspring resulting from combining the qualities of two organisms of different varieties, subspecies, species or genera through sexual reproduction. Generally, it means that each cell has genetic material from two different organisms, whereas an individual where some cells are derived from a different organism is called a chimera. Hybrids are not always intermediates between their parents such as in blending inheritance (a now discredited theory in modern genetics by particulate inheritance), but can show hybrid vigor, sometimes growing larger or taller than either parent. The concept of a hybrid is interpreted differently in animal and plant breeding, where there is interest in the individual parentage. In genetics, attention is focused on the numbers of chromosomes. In taxonomy, a key question is how closely related the parent species must be for their offspring to be classified as a hybrid, since crosses between species within the same genera are often treated differently from crosses between more distantly related taxa.

Many animal species are reproductively isolated by strong barriers to hybridization, which include genetic and morphological differences, differing times of fertility, mating behaviors and cues, and physiological rejection of sperm cells or the developing embryo. Some act before fertilization and others after it. Similar barriers exist in plants, with differences in flowering times, pollen vectors, inhibition of pollen tube growth, somatoplastic sterility, cytoplasmic-genic male sterility and the structure of the chromosomes. A few animal species and many plant species, however, are the result of hybrid speciation, including important crop plants such as wheat, where the number of chromosomes has been doubled.

A form of often intentional human-mediated hybridization is the crossing of wild and domesticated species. This is common in both traditional horticulture and modern agriculture; many commercially useful fruits, flowers, garden herbs, and trees have been produced by hybridization. One such flower, Oenothera lamarckiana, was central to early genetics research into mutationism and polyploidy. It is also more occasionally done in the livestock and pet trades; some well-known wild × domestic hybrids are beefalo and wolfdogs. Human selective breeding of domesticated animals and plants has also resulted in the development of distinct breeds (usually called cultivars in reference to plants); crossbreeds between them (without any wild stock) are sometimes also imprecisely referred to as "hybrids".

Hybrid humans existed in prehistory. For example, Neanderthals and anatomically modern humans are thought to have interbred as recently as 40,000 years ago. Mythological hybrids appear in human culture in forms as diverse as the Minotaur, blends of animals, humans and mythical beasts such as centaurs and sphinxes, and the Nephilim of the Biblical apocrypha described as the wicked sons of fallen angels and attractive women.

== Significance ==
=== In evolution ===
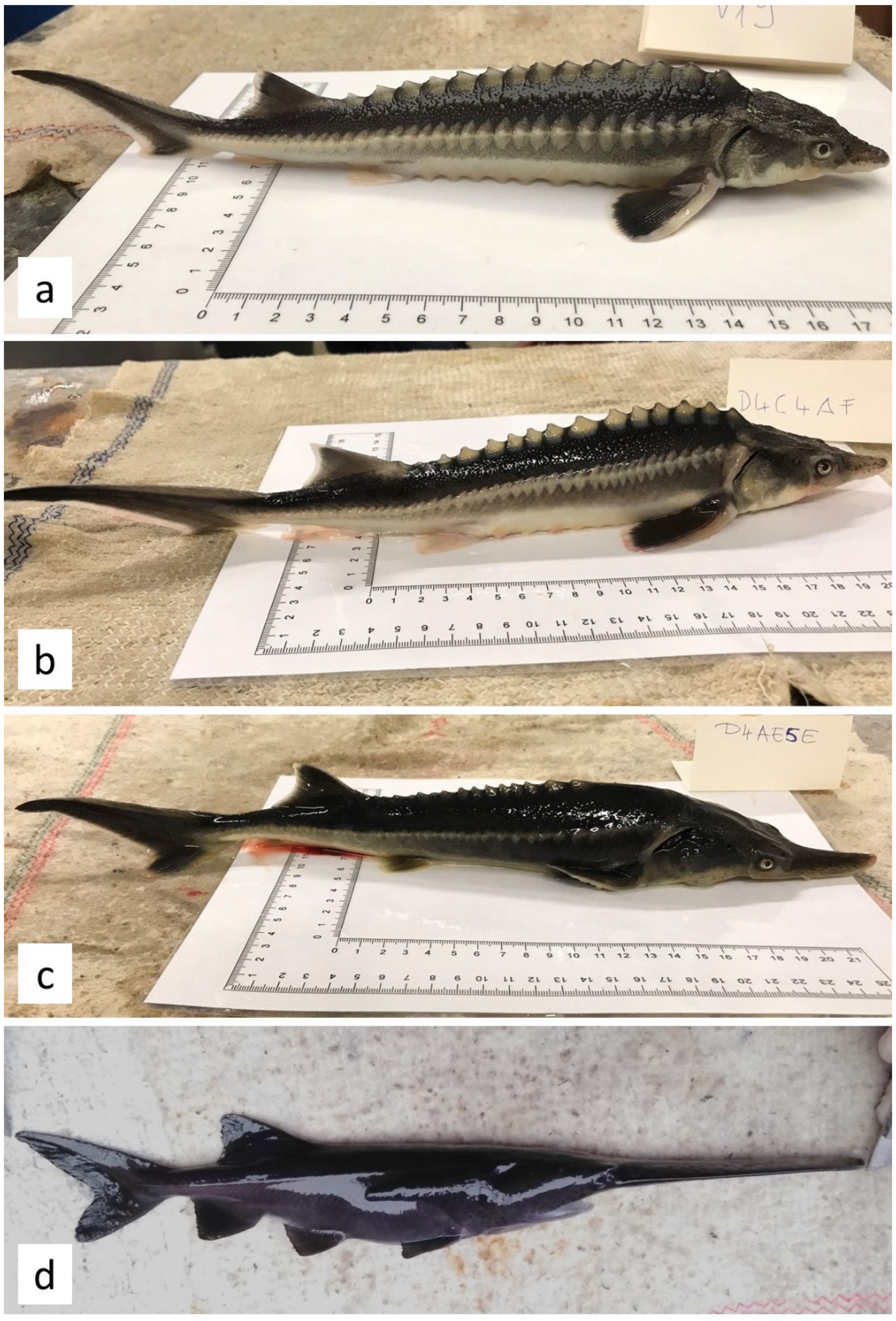
The sturddlefish, a hybrid of the American paddlefish and the Russian sturgeon, two species whose last common ancestor lived 184 million years ago. Yearlings of the Russian sturgeon (a) and the American paddlefish (d), and their hybrids: (b) and (c)

Hybridization between species plays an important role in evolution, though there is much debate about its significance. Roughly 25% of plants and 10% of animals are known to form hybrids with at least one other species. One example of an adaptive benefit to hybridization is that hybrid individuals can form a "bridge" transmitting potentially helpful genes from one species to another when the hybrid backcrosses with one of its parent species, a process called introgression. Hybrids can also cause speciation, either because the hybrids are genetically incompatible with their parents and not each other, or because the hybrids occupy a different niche than either parent.

Hybridization is a particularly common mechanism for speciation in plants, and is now known to be fundamental to the evolutionary history of plants. Plants frequently form polyploids, individuals with more than two copies of each chromosome. Whole genome doubling has occurred repeatedly in plant evolution. When two plant species hybridize, the hybrid may double its chromosome count by incorporating the entire nuclear genome of both parents, resulting in offspring that are reproductively incompatible with either parent because of different chromosome counts.

=== In conservation ===
Human impact on the environment has resulted in an increase in the interbreeding between regional species, and the proliferation of introduced species worldwide has also resulted in an increase in hybridization. This has been referred to as genetic pollution out of concern that it may threaten many species with extinction. Similarly, genetic erosion from monoculture in crop plants may be damaging the gene pools of many species for future breeding.

The conservation impacts of hybridization between species are highly debated. While hybridization could potentially threaten rare species or lineages by "swamping" the genetically "pure" individuals with hybrids, hybridization could also save a rare lineage from extinction by introducing genetic diversity. It has been proposed that hybridization could be a useful tool to conserve biodiversity by allowing organisms to adapt, and that efforts to preserve the separateness of a "pure" lineage could harm conservation by lowering the organisms' genetic diversity and adaptive potential, particularly in species with low populations. While endangered species are often protected by law, hybrids are often excluded from protection, resulting in challenges to conservation.

== Etymology ==
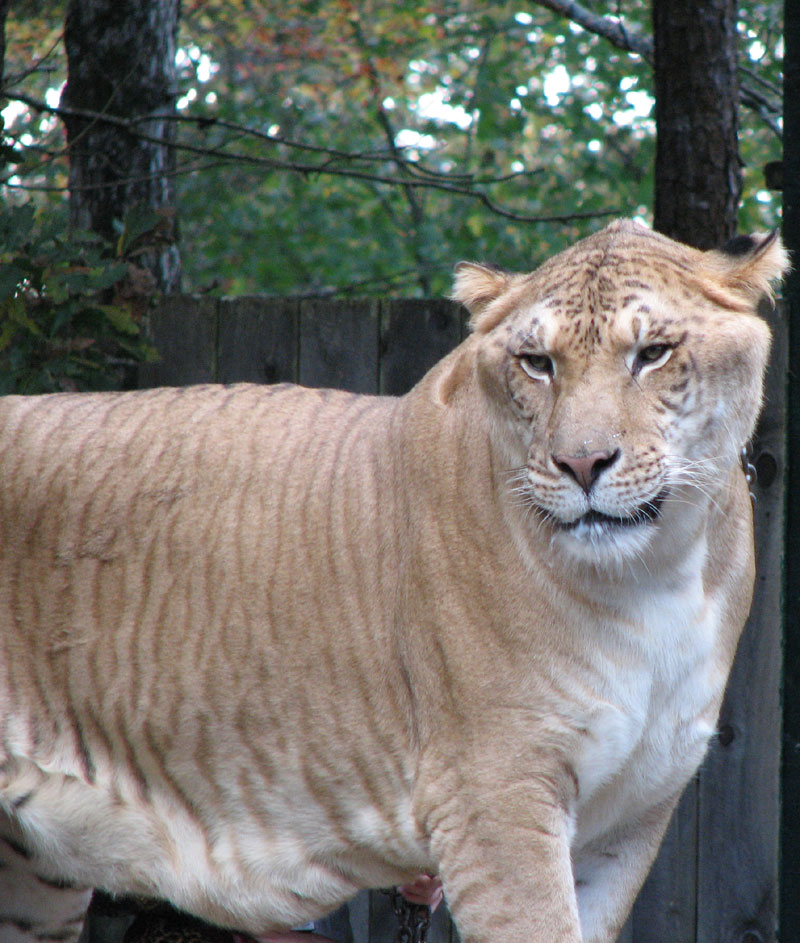
Liger, a lion/tiger hybrid bred in captivity

The term hybrid is derived from Latin hybrida, used for crosses such as of a tame sow and a wild boar. The term came into popular use in English in the 19th century, though examples of its use have been found from the early 17th century.

Conspicuous hybrids are popularly named with portmanteau words, starting in the 1920s with the breeding of tiger–lion hybrids (liger and tigon). Examples of this include the cama, pumapard, sturddlefish, and wholphin.

== As seen by different disciplines ==
=== Animal and plant breeding ===
From the point of view of animal and plant breeders, there are several kinds of hybrid formed from crosses within a species, such as between different breeds. Single cross hybrids result from the cross between two true-breeding organisms which produces an F1 hybrid (first filial generation). The cross between two different homozygous lines produces an F1 hybrid that is heterozygous; having two alleles, one contributed by each parent and typically one is dominant and the other recessive. Typically, the F1 generation is also phenotypically homogeneous, producing offspring that are all similar to each other. Double cross hybrids result from the cross between two different F1 hybrids (i.e., there are four unrelated grandparents). Three-way cross hybrids result from the cross between an F1 hybrid and an inbred line. Triple cross hybrids result from the crossing of two different three-way cross hybrids. Top cross (or "topcross") hybrids result from the crossing of a top quality or pure-bred male and a lower quality female, intended to improve the quality of the offspring, on average.

Population hybrids result from the crossing of plants or animals in one population with those of another population. These include interspecific hybrids or crosses between different breeds. In biology, the result of crossing of two populations is called a synthetic population.

In horticulture, the term stable hybrid is used to describe an annual plant that, if grown and bred in a small monoculture free of external pollen (e.g., an air-filtered greenhouse) produces offspring that are "true to type" with respect to phenotype; i.e., a true-breeding organism.

=== Biogeography ===
Hybridization can occur in the hybrid zones where the geographical ranges of species, subspecies, or distinct genetic lineages overlap. For example, the butterfly Limenitis arthemis has two major subspecies in North America, L. a. arthemis (the white admiral) and L. a. astyanax (the red-spotted purple). The white admiral has a bright, white band on its wings, while the red-spotted purple has cooler blue-green shades. Hybridization occurs between a narrow area across New England, southern Ontario, and the Great Lakes, the "suture region". It is at these regions that the subspecies were formed. Other hybrid zones have formed between described species of plants and animals.

=== Genetics ===
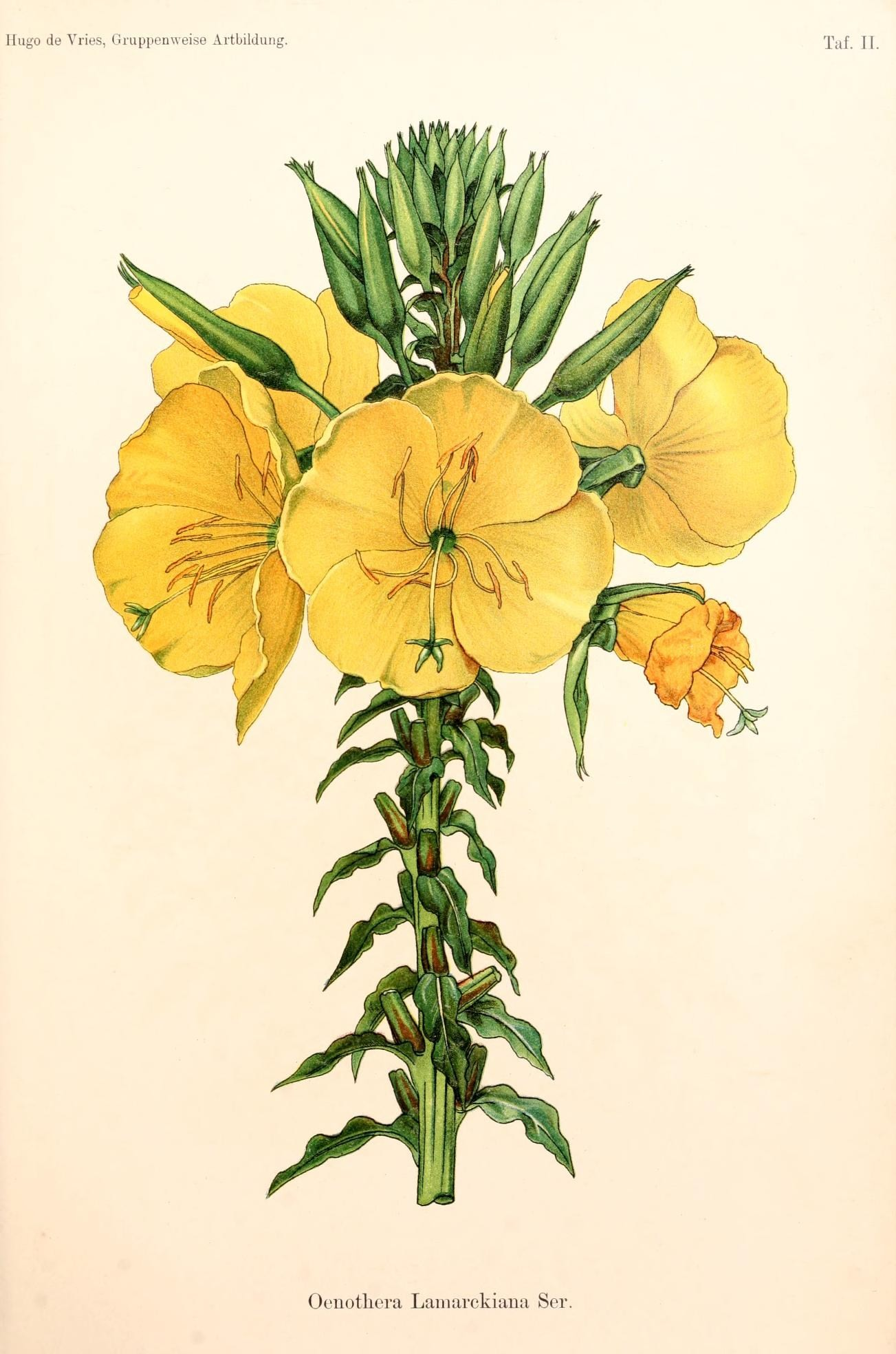
Oenothera lamarckiana is a permanent natural hybrid, studied intensively by the geneticist Hugo de Vries. Illustration by De Vries, 1913.

From the point of view of genetics, several different kinds of hybrid can be distinguished. A genetic hybrid carries two different alleles of the same gene, where for instance one allele may code for a lighter coat colour than the other. A structural hybrid results from the fusion of gametes that have differing structure in at least one chromosome, as a result of structural abnormalities. A numerical hybrid results from the fusion of gametes having different haploid numbers of chromosomes. A permanent hybrid results when only the heterozygous genotype occurs, as in Oenothera lamarckiana, because all homozygous combinations are lethal. In the early history of genetics, Hugo de Vries supposed these were caused by mutation.

=== Genetic complementation ===
Genetic complementation is a hybridization test widely used in genetics to determine whether two separately isolated mutants that have the same (or similar) phenotype are defective in the same gene or in different genes (see complementation). If a hybrid organism containing the genomes of two different mutant parental organisms displays a wild type phenotype, it is ordinarily considered that the two parental mutant organisms are defective in different genes. If the hybrid organism displays a distinctly mutant phenotype, the two mutant parental organisms are considered to be defective in the same gene. However, in some cases the hybrid organism may display a phenotype that is only weakly (or partially) wild-type, and this may reflect intragenic (interallelic) complementation.

=== Taxonomy ===
From the point of view of taxonomy, hybrids differ according to their parentage. Hybrids between different subspecies (such as between the dog and Eurasian wolf) are called intra-specific hybrids. Interspecific hybrids are the offspring from interspecies mating; these sometimes result in hybrid speciation. Intergeneric hybrids result from matings between different genera, such as between sheep and goats. Interfamilial hybrids, such as between chickens and guineafowl or pheasants, are reliably described but extremely rare. Interordinal hybrids (between different orders) are few, but have been engineered between the sea urchin Strongylocentrotus purpuratus (female) and the sand dollar Dendraster excentricus (male).

== Biology ==
=== Expression of parental traits ===
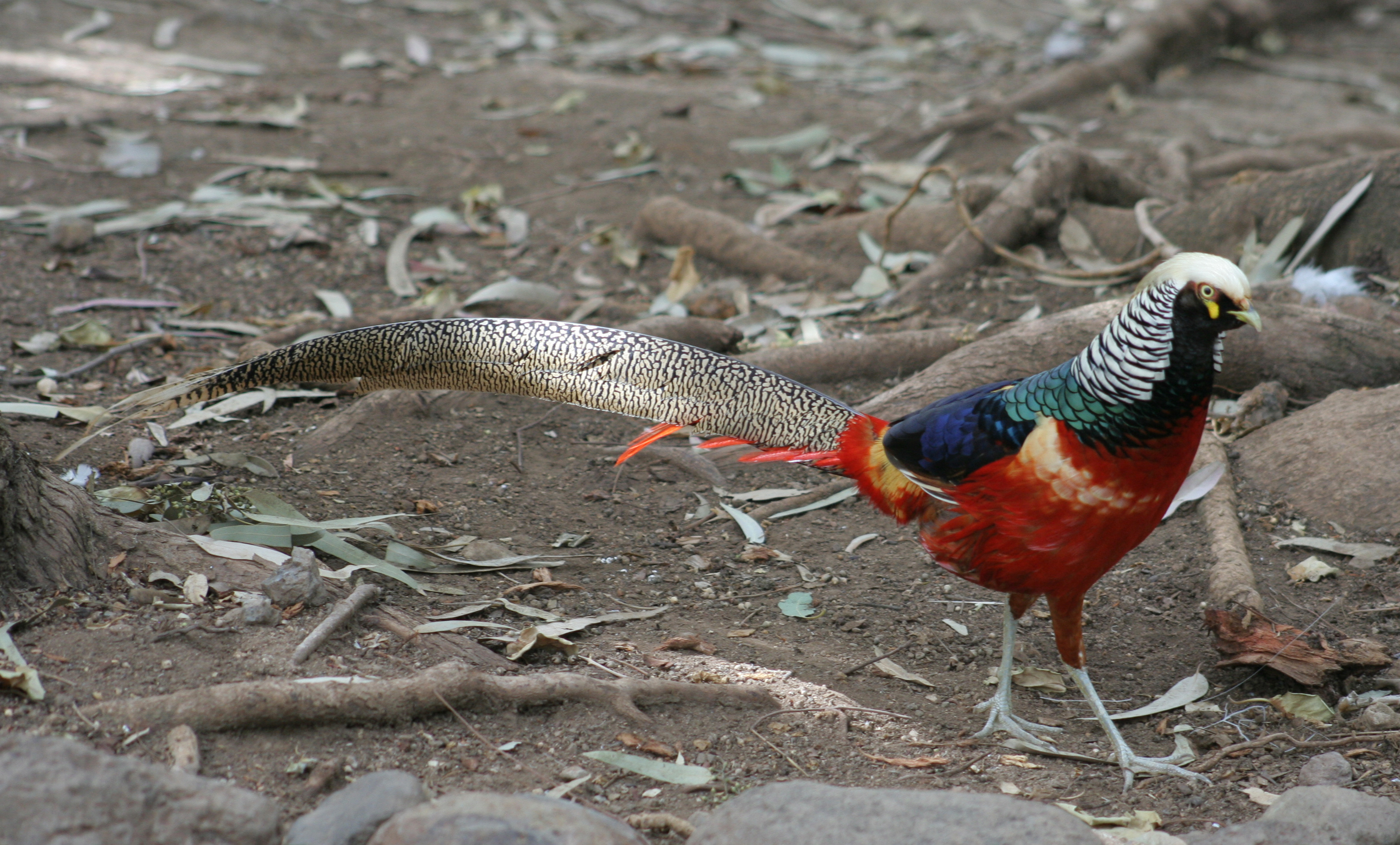
Hybrid between Lady Amherst's pheasant (Chrysolophus amherstiae) and another species, probably golden pheasant (Chrysolophus pictus)

When two distinct types of organisms breed with each other, the resulting hybrids typically have intermediate traits (e.g., one plant parent has red flowers, the other has white, and the hybrid, pink flowers). Commonly, hybrids also combine traits seen only separately in one parent or the other (e.g., a bird hybrid might combine the yellow head of one parent with the orange belly of the other).

=== Mechanisms of reproductive isolation ===
Interspecific hybrids are bred by mating individuals from two species, normally from within the same genus. The offspring display traits and characteristics of both parents, but are often sterile, preventing gene flow between the species. Sterility is often attributed to the different number of chromosomes between the two species. For example, donkeys have 62 chromosomes, horses have 64 chromosomes, and mules or hinnies have 63 chromosomes. Mules, hinnies, and other normally sterile interspecific hybrids cannot produce viable gametes, because differences in chromosome structure prevent appropriate pairing and segregation during meiosis, meiosis is disrupted, and viable sperm and eggs are not formed. However, fertility in female mules has been reported with a donkey as the father.

A variety of mechanisms limit the success of hybridization, including the large genetic difference between most species. Barriers include morphological differences, differing times of fertility, mating behaviors and cues, and physiological rejection of sperm cells or the developing embryo. Some act before fertilization; others after it.

In plants, some barriers to hybridization include blooming period differences, different pollinator vectors, inhibition of pollen tube growth, somatoplastic sterility, cytoplasmic-genic male sterility and structural differences of the chromosomes.

=== Speciation ===
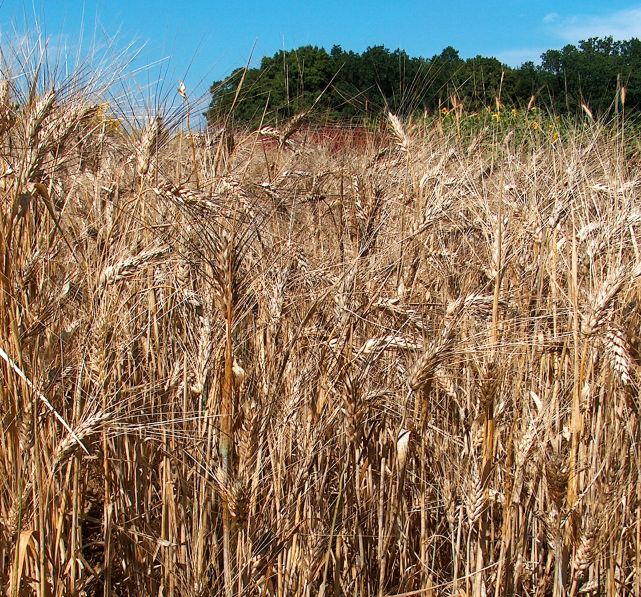
Durum wheat is tetraploid, derived from wild emmer wheat, which is a hybrid of two diploid wild grasses, Triticum urartu and a wild goatgrass such as Aegilops searsii or Ae. speltoides.

A few animal species are the result of hybridization. The Lonicera fly is a natural hybrid. The American red wolf appears to be a hybrid of the gray wolf and the coyote, although its taxonomic status has been a subject of controversy. The European edible frog is a semi-permanent hybrid between pool frogs and marsh frogs; its population requires the continued presence of at least one of the parent species. Cave paintings indicate that the European bison is a natural hybrid of the aurochs and the steppe bison. Among cichlids, hybridisation is an important source of phenotypic novelty, especially when the two species have significant genetic distance, and has been an important driver of adaptive radiation and speciation.

Plant hybridization is more commonplace compared to animal hybridization. Many crop species are hybrids, including notably the polyploid wheats: some have four sets of chromosomes (tetraploid) or six (hexaploid), while other wheat species have (like most eukaryotic organisms) two sets (diploid), so hybridization events likely involved the doubling of chromosome sets, causing immediate genetic isolation.

Hybridization may be important in speciation in some plant groups. However, homoploid hybrid speciation (not increasing the number of sets of chromosomes) may be rare: by 1997, only eight natural examples had been fully described. Experimental studies suggest that hybridization offers a rapid route to speciation, a prediction confirmed by the fact that early generation hybrids and ancient hybrid species have matching genomes, meaning that once hybridization has occurred, the new hybrid genome can remain stable.

Many hybrid zones are known where the ranges of two species meet, and hybrids are continually produced in great numbers. These hybrid zones are useful as biological model systems for studying the mechanisms of speciation. Recently DNA analysis of a bear shot by a hunter in the Northwest Territories confirmed the existence of naturally occurring and fertile grizzly–polar bear hybrids.

=== Hybrid vigour ===
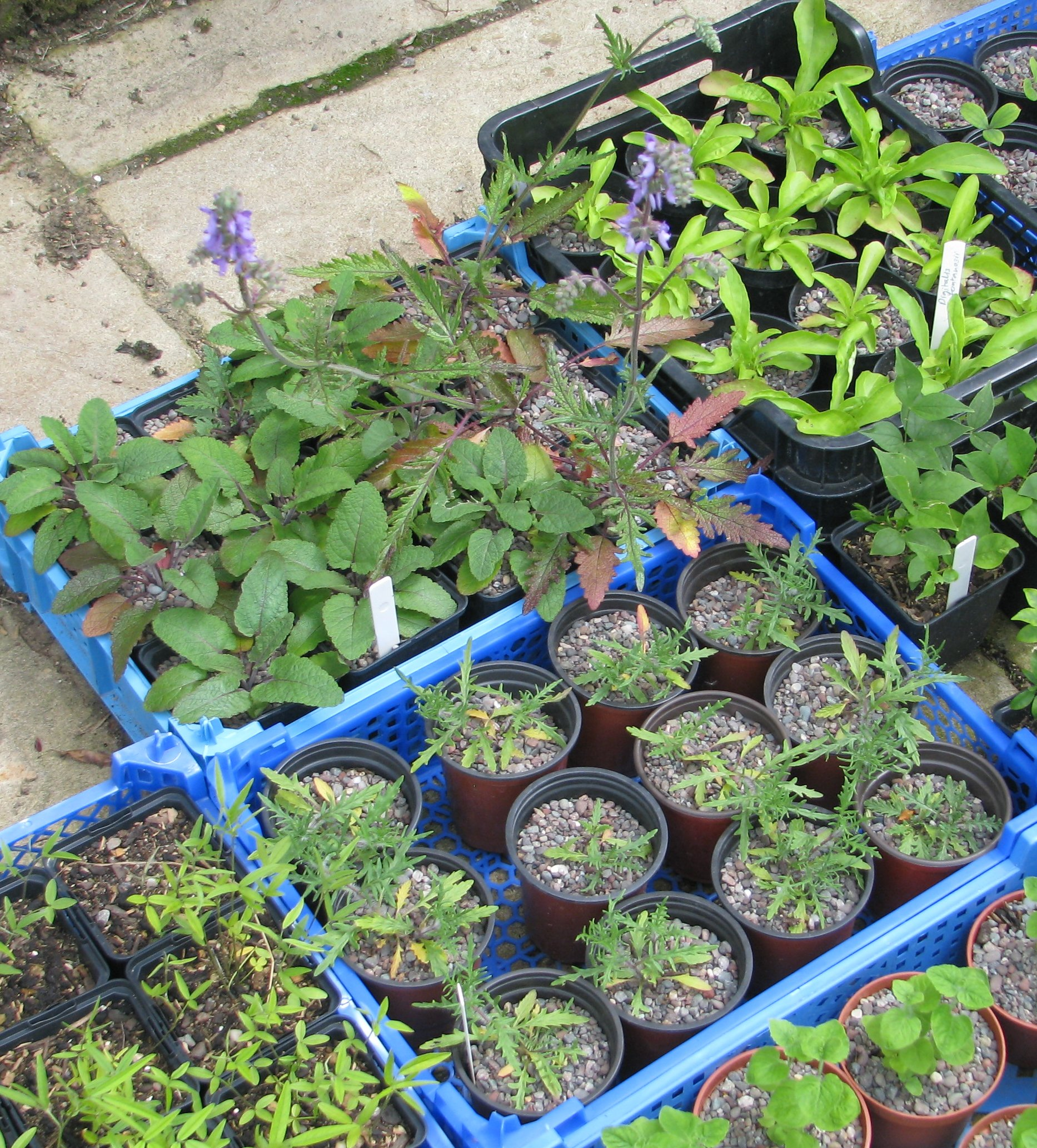
Hybrid vigour: Salvia jurisicii x nutans hybrids (top centre, with flowers) are taller than their parents Salvia jurisicii (centre tray) or Salvia nutans (top left).

Hybridization between reproductively isolated species often results in hybrid offspring with lower fitness than either parental. However, hybrids are not, as might be expected, always intermediate between their parents (as if there were blending inheritance), but are sometimes stronger or perform better than either parental lineage or variety, a phenomenon called heterosis, hybrid vigour, or heterozygote advantage. This is most common with plant hybrids. A transgressive phenotype is a phenotype that displays more extreme characteristics than either of the parent lines. Plant breeders use several techniques to produce hybrids, including line breeding and the formation of complex hybrids. An economically important example is hybrid maize (corn), which provides a considerable seed yield advantage over open pollinated varieties. Hybrid seed dominates the commercial maize seed market in the United States, Canada and many other major maize-producing countries.

In a hybrid, any trait that falls outside the range of parental variation (and is thus not simply intermediate between its parents) is considered heterotic. Positive heterosis produces more robust hybrids, they might be stronger or bigger; while the term negative heterosis refers to weaker or smaller hybrids. Heterosis is common in both animal and plant hybrids. For example, hybrids between a lion and a tigress ("ligers") are much larger than either of the two progenitors, while "tigons" (lioness × tiger) are smaller. Similarly, the hybrids between the common pheasant (Phasianus colchicus) and domestic fowl (Gallus gallus) are larger than either of their parents, as are those produced between the common pheasant and hen golden pheasant (Chrysolophus pictus). Spurs are absent in hybrids of the former type, although present in both parents.

== Human influence ==
=== Anthropogenic hybridization ===
Hybridization is greatly influenced by human impact on the environment, through effects such as habitat fragmentation and species introductions. Such impacts make it difficult to conserve the genetics of populations undergoing introgressive hybridization. Humans have introduced species worldwide to environments for a long time, both intentionally for purposes such as biological control, and unintentionally, as with accidental escapes of individuals. Introductions can drastically affect populations, including through hybridization.

=== Management ===
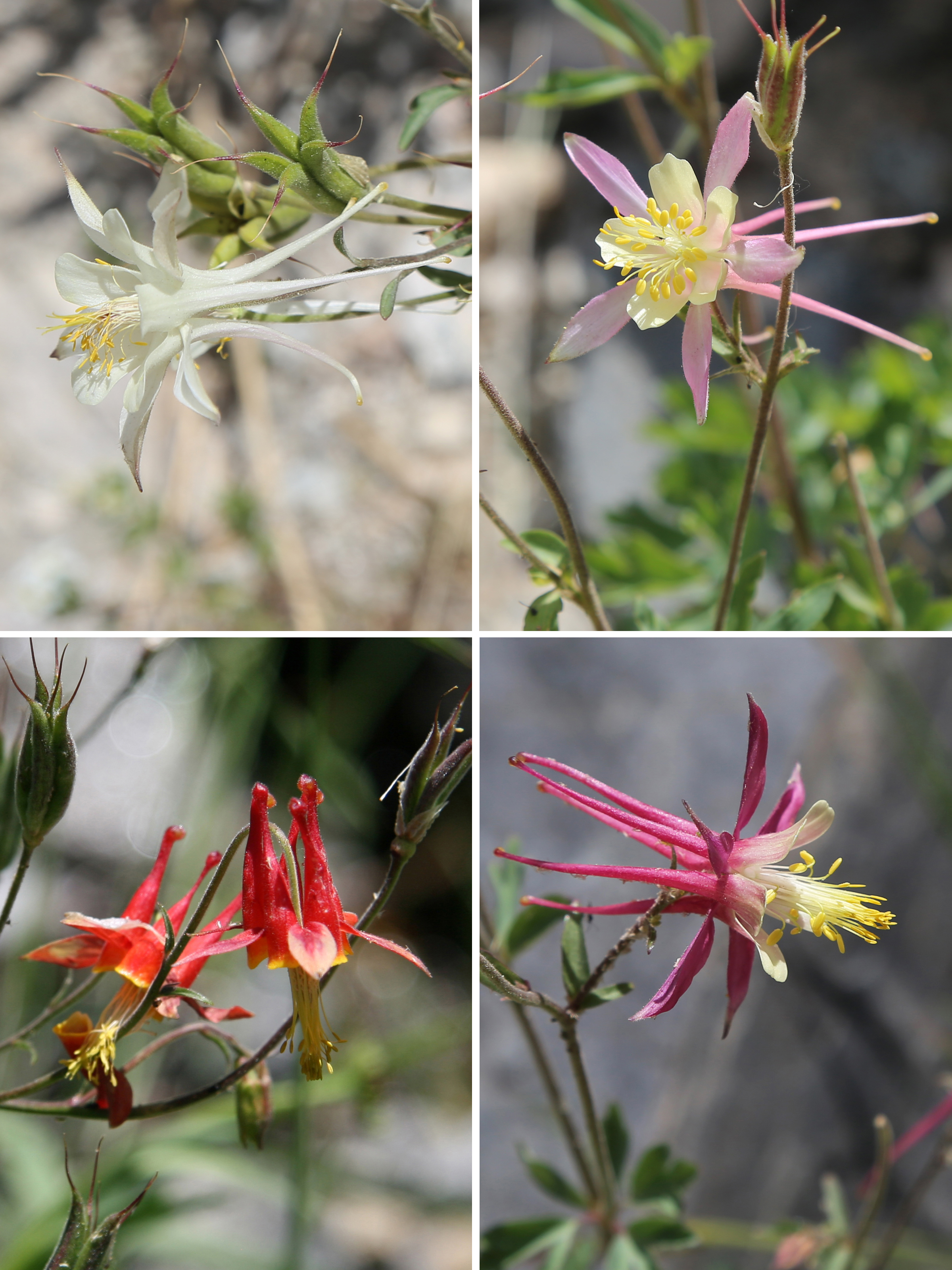
Examples of hybrid flowers from hybrid swarms of Aquilegia pubescens and Aquilegia formosa

There is a kind of continuum with three semi-distinct categories dealing with anthropogenic hybridization: hybridization without introgression, hybridization with widespread introgression (backcrossing with one of the parent species), and hybrid swarms (highly variable populations with much interbreeding as well as backcrossing with the parent species). Depending on where a population falls along this continuum, the management plans for that population will change. Hybridization is currently an area of great discussion within wildlife management and habitat management. Global climate change is creating other changes such as difference in population distributions which are indirect causes for an increase in anthropogenic hybridization.

Conservationists disagree on when is the proper time to give up on a population that is becoming a hybrid swarm, or to try and save the still existing pure individuals. Once a population becomes a complete mixture, the goal becomes to conserve those hybrids to avoid their loss. Conservationists treat each case on its merits, depending on detecting hybrids within the population. It is nearly impossible to formulate a uniform hybridization policy, because hybridization can occur beneficially when it occurs "naturally", and when hybrid swarms are the only remaining evidence of prior species, they need to be conserved as well.

=== Genetic mixing and extinction ===
Regionally developed ecotypes can be threatened with extinction when new alleles or genes are introduced that alter that ecotype. This is sometimes called genetic mixing. Hybridization and introgression, which can happen in natural and hybrid populations, of new genetic material can lead to the replacement of local genotypes if the hybrids are more fit and have breeding advantages over the indigenous ecotype or species. These hybridization events can result from the introduction of non-native genotypes by humans or through habitat modification, bringing previously isolated species into contact. Genetic mixing can be especially detrimental for rare species in isolated habitats, ultimately affecting the population to such a degree that none of the originally genetically distinct population remains.

=== Effect on biodiversity and food security ===
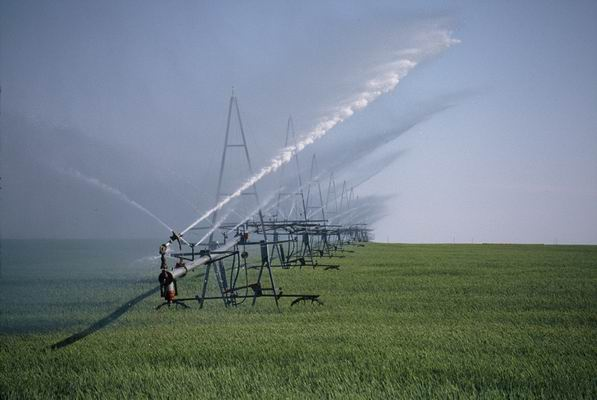
The Green Revolution of the 20th century relied on hybridization to create high-yielding varieties, along with increased reliance on inputs of fertilizers, pesticides, and irrigation.

In agriculture and animal husbandry, the Green Revolution's use of conventional hybridization increased yields by breeding high-yielding varieties. The replacement of locally indigenous breeds, compounded with unintentional cross-pollination and crossbreeding (genetic mixing), has reduced the gene pools of various wild and indigenous breeds resulting in the loss of genetic diversity. Since the indigenous breeds are often well-adapted to local extremes in climate and have immunity to local pathogens, this can be a significant genetic erosion of the gene pool for future breeding. Therefore, commercial plant geneticists strive to breed "widely adapted" cultivars to counteract this tendency.

== Different taxa ==
=== In animals ===
==== Mammals ====
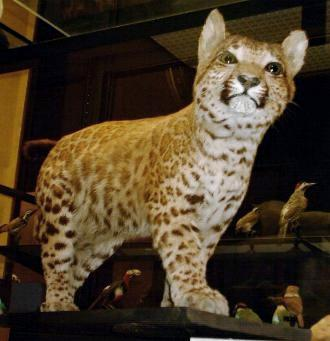
A pumapard, the hybrid offspring of a cougar and a leopard, two cats belonging to different subfamilies.

Familiar examples of equid hybrids are the mule, a cross between a female horse and a male donkey, and the hinny, a cross between a female donkey and a male horse. Pairs of complementary types like the mule and hinny are called reciprocal hybrids. Polar bears and brown bears are another case of a hybridizing species pairs, and introgression among non-sister species of bears appears to have shaped the Ursidae family tree. Among many other mammal crosses are hybrid camels, crosses between a bactrian camel and a dromedary. There are many examples of felid hybrids, including the liger. The oldest-known animal hybrid bred by humans is the kunga equid hybrid produced as a draft animal and status symbol 4,500 years ago in Umm el-Marra, present-day Syria.

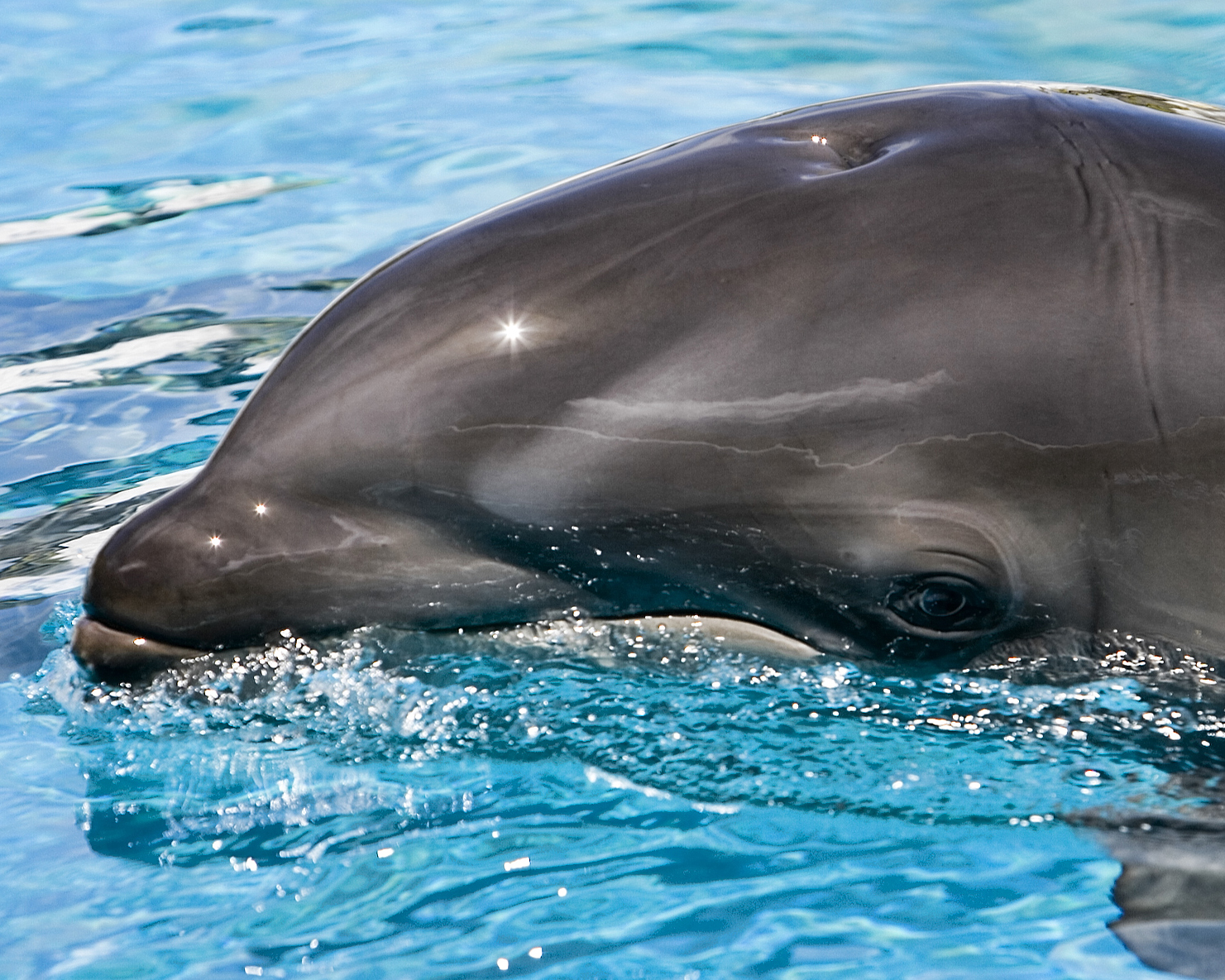
Kawili Kai, a second-generation wolphin calf, born of the mating of a male bottlenose dolphin and a first-generation wolphin female (herself a hybrid of a bottlenose dolphin and a false killer whale).

The first known instance of hybrid speciation in marine mammals was discovered in 2014. The clymene dolphin (Stenella clymene) is a hybrid of two Atlantic species, the spinner and striped dolphins. In 2019, scientists confirmed that a skull found 30 years earlier was a hybrid between the beluga whale and narwhal, dubbed the narluga.

==== Birds ====
Hybridization between species is common in birds. Hybrid birds are purposefully bred by humans, but hybridization is also common in the wild. Waterfowl have a particularly high incidence of hybridization, with at least 60% of species known to produce hybrids with another species. Among ducks, mallards widely hybridize with many other species, and the genetic relationships between ducks are further complicated by the widespread gene flow between wild and domestic mallards.

One of the most common interspecific hybrids in geese occurs between Greylag and Canada geese (Anser anser x Branta canadensis). One potential mechanism for the occurrence of hybrids in these geese is interspecific nest parasitism, where an egg is laid in the nest of another species to be raised by non-biological parents. The chick imprints upon and eventually seeks a mate among the species that raised it, instead of the species of its biological parents.

Cagebird breeders sometimes breed bird hybrids known as mules between species of finch, such as goldfinch × canary.

==== Amphibians ====
Among amphibians, Japanese giant salamanders and Chinese giant salamanders have created hybrids that threaten the survival of Japanese giant salamanders because of competition for similar resources in Japan.

==== Fish ====
Among fish, a group of about 50 natural hybrids between Australian blacktip shark and the larger common blacktip shark was found by Australia's eastern coast in 2012.

Russian sturgeon and American paddlefish were hybridized in captivity when sperm from the paddlefish and eggs from the sturgeon were combined, unexpectedly resulting in viable offspring. This hybrid is called a sturddlefish.

==== Cephalochordates ====
The two genera Asymmetron and Branchiostoma are able to produce viable hybrid offspring, even if none have lived into adulthood so far, despite the parents' common ancestor living tens of millions of years ago.

==== Insects ====
Among insects, so-called killer bees were accidentally created during an attempt to breed a strain of bees that would both produce more honey and be better adapted to tropical conditions. It was done by crossing a European honey bee and an African bee.

The Colias eurytheme and C. philodice butterflies have retained enough genetic compatibility to produce viable hybrid offspring. Hybrid speciation may have produced the diverse Heliconius butterflies, but that is disputed.

The two closely related harvester ant species Pogonomyrmex barbatus and P. rugosus have evolved, in one hybrid zone, to depend on hybridization. When a queen fertilizes her eggs with sperm from males of her own species, the offspring is always new queens. And when she fertilizes the eggs with sperm from males of the other species, the offspring is always sterile worker ants (and because ants are haplodiploid, unfertilized eggs become males). Without mating with males of the other species, the queens are unable to produce workers, and will fail to establish a colony of their own.

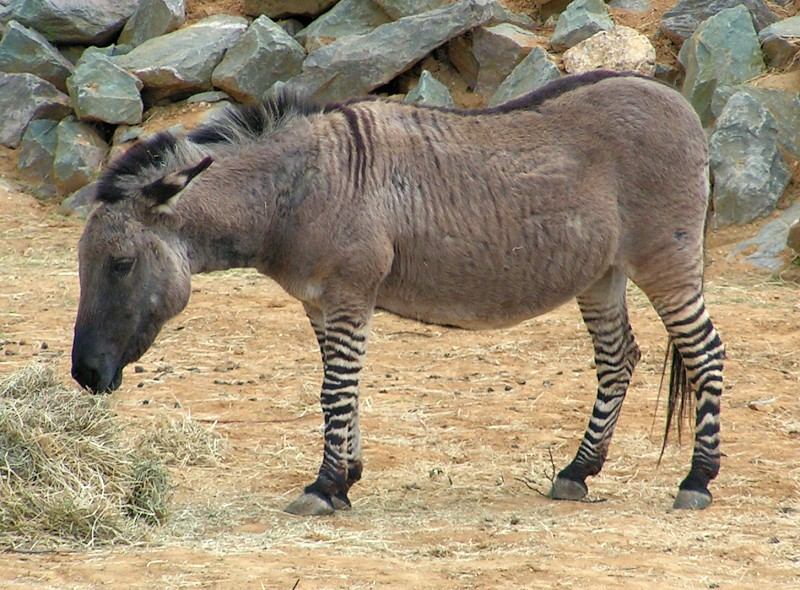
A "zonkey", a zebra/donkey hybrid

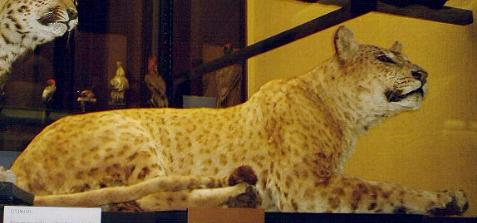
A "jaglion", a jaguar/lion hybrid

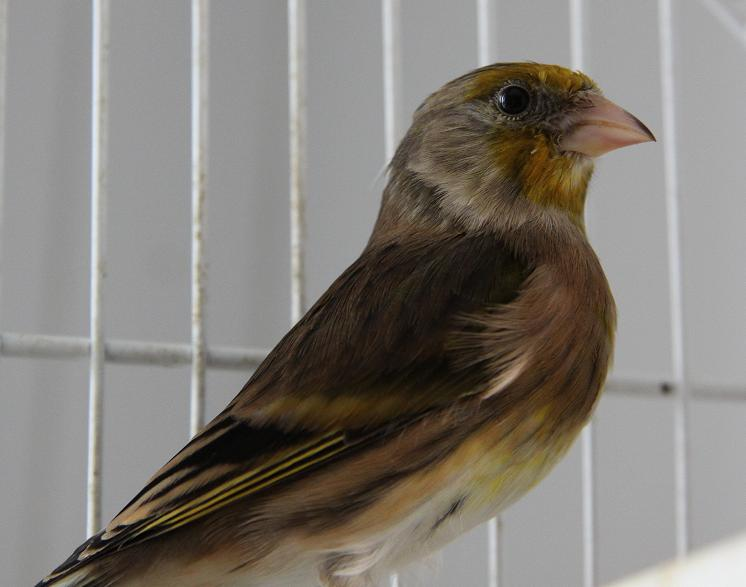
A domestic canary/goldfinch hybrid

=== In plants ===
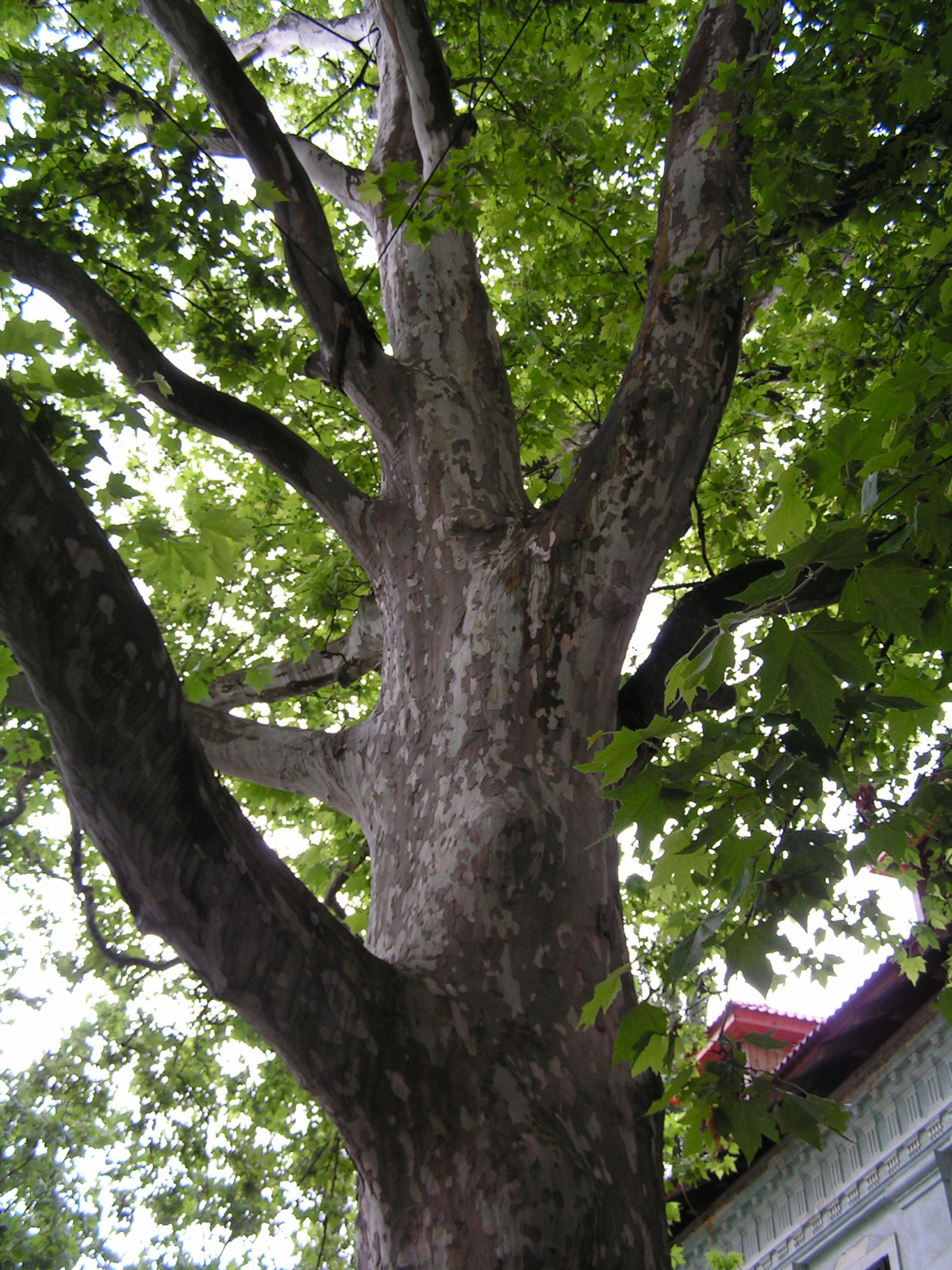
The London plane Platanus × hispanica, is a natural hybrid, popular for street planting.

Plant species hybridize more readily than animal species, and the resulting hybrids are fertile more often. Many plant species are the result of hybridization, combined with polyploidy, which duplicates the chromosomes. Chromosome duplication allows orderly meiosis and so viable seed can be produced.

Plant hybrids are generally given names that include an "×" (not in italics), such as Platanus × hispanica for the London plane, a natural hybrid of P. orientalis (oriental plane) and P. occidentalis (American sycamore). The parent's names may be kept in their entirety, as seen in Prunus persica × Prunus americana, with the female parent's name given first, or if not known, the parent's names given alphabetically.

Plant species that are genetically compatible may not hybridize in nature for various reasons, including geographical isolation, differences in flowering period, or differences in pollinators. Species that are brought together by humans in gardens may hybridize naturally, or hybridization can be facilitated by human efforts, such as altered flowering period or artificial pollination. Hybrids are sometimes created by humans to produce improved plants that have some of the characteristics of each of the parent species. Much work is now being done with hybrids between crops and their wild relatives to improve disease resistance or climate resilience for both agricultural and horticultural crops.

Some crop plants are hybrids from different genera (intergeneric hybrids), such as Triticale, × Triticosecale, a wheat–rye hybrid. Most modern and ancient wheat breeds are themselves hybrids; bread wheat, Triticum aestivum, is a hexaploid hybrid of three wild grasses. Several commercial fruits including loganberry (Rubus × loganobaccus) and grapefruit (Citrus × paradisi) are hybrids, as are garden herbs such as peppermint (Mentha × piperita), and trees such as the London plane (Platanus × hispanica). Among many natural plant hybrids is Iris albicans, a sterile hybrid that spreads by rhizome division, and Oenothera lamarckiana, a flower that was the subject of important experiments by Hugo de Vries that produced an understanding of polyploidy.

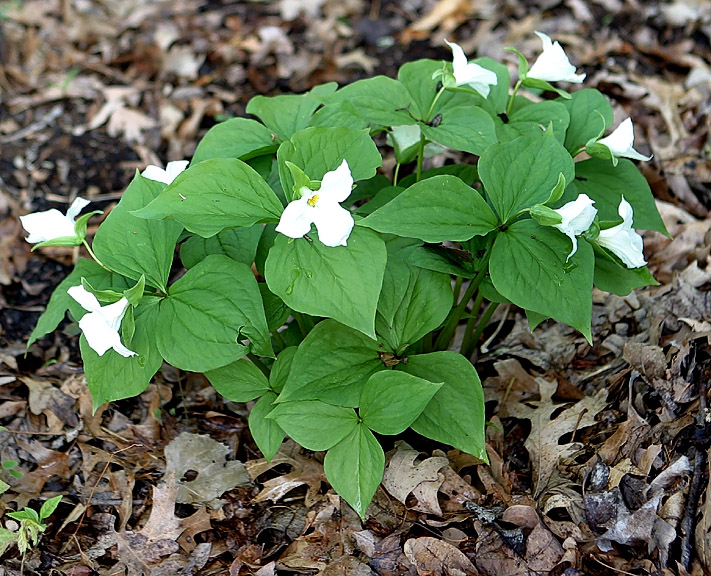
A sterile hybrid between Trillium cernuum and T. grandiflorum

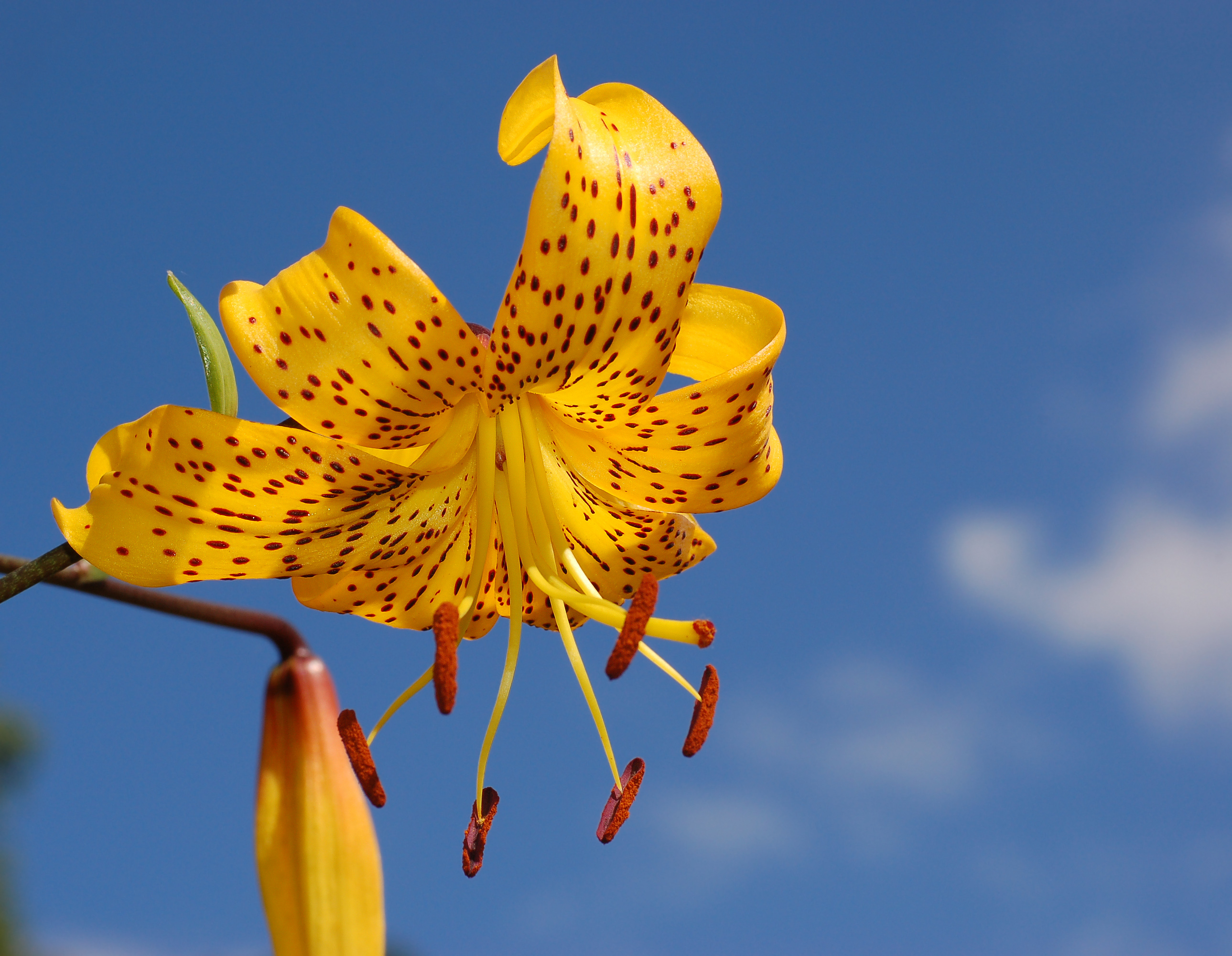
An ornamental lily hybrid known as Lilium 'Citronella'

Sterility in a non-polyploid hybrid is often a result of chromosome number; if parents are of differing chromosome pair number, the offspring will have an odd number of chromosomes, which leaves them unable to produce chromosomally balanced gametes. While that is undesirable in a crop such as wheat, for which growing a crop that produces no seeds would be pointless, it is an attractive attribute in some fruits. Triploid bananas and watermelons are intentionally bred because they produce no seeds and are also parthenocarpic.

=== In fungi ===
Hybridization between fungal species is common and well established, particularly in yeast. Yeast hybrids are widely found and used in human-related activities, such as brewing and winemaking. The production of lager beers for instance are known to be carried out by the yeast Saccharomyces pastorianus, a cryotolerant hybrid between Saccharomyces cerevisiae and Saccharomyces eubayanus, which allows fermentation at low temperatures.

=== In humans ===
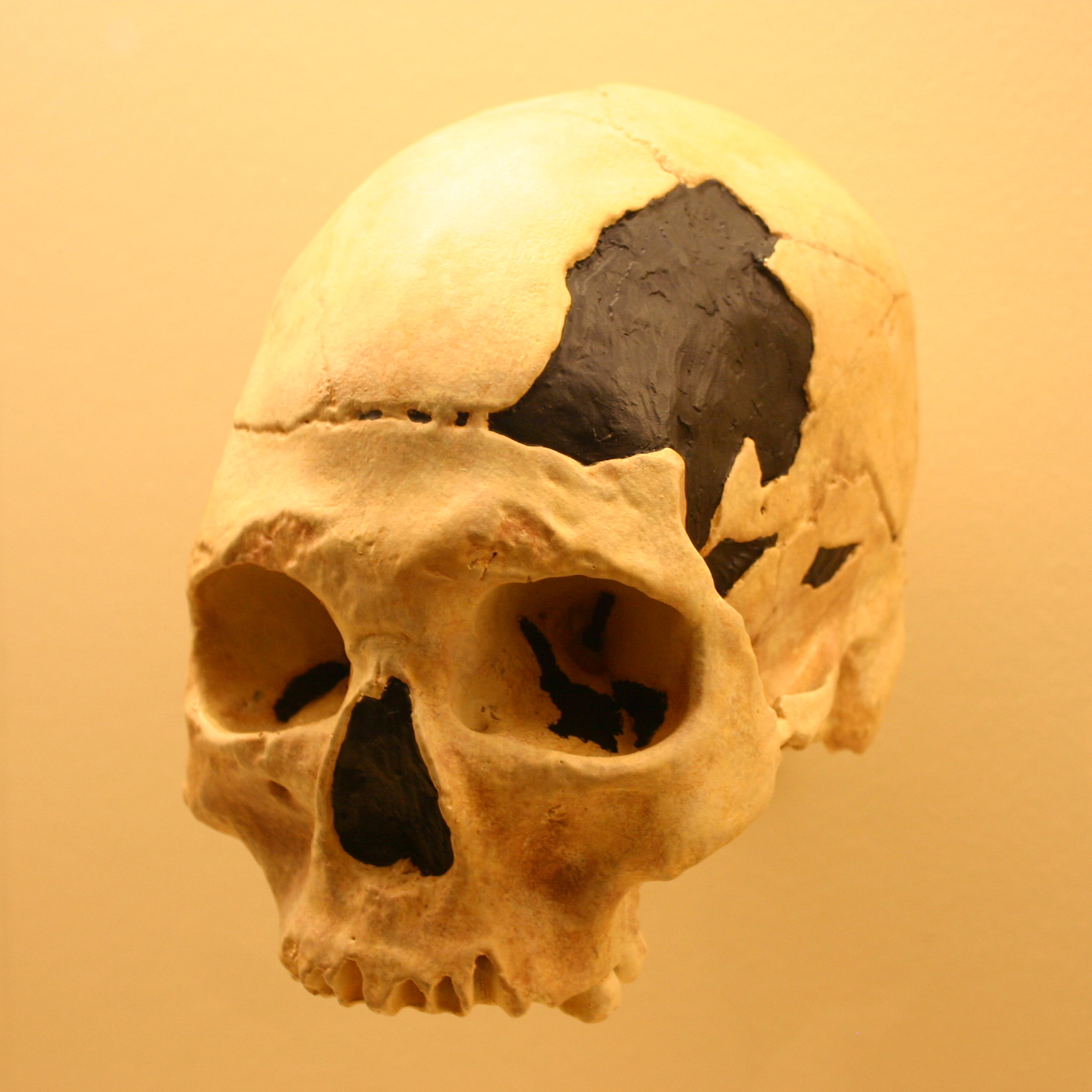
Oase 2 skull may be a human-Neanderthal hybrid.

There is evidence of hybridization between modern humans and other species of the genus Homo. In 2010, the Neanderthal genome project showed that 1–4% of DNA from all people living today, apart from most Sub-Saharan Africans, is of Neanderthal heritage. Analyzing the genomes of 600 Europeans and East Asians found that combining them covered 20% of the Neanderthal genome that is in the modern human population. Ancient human populations lived and interbred with Neanderthals, Denisovans, and at least one other extinct Homo species. Thus, Neanderthal and Denisovan DNA has been incorporated into human DNA by introgression.

In 1998, a complete prehistorical skeleton found in Portugal, the Lapedo child, had features of both anatomically modern humans and Neanderthals. Some ancient human skulls with especially large nasal cavities and unusually shaped braincases represent human-Neanderthal hybrids. A 37,000- to 42,000-year-old human jawbone found in Romania's Oase cave contains traces of Neanderthal ancestry (Note: Signs of Neanderthal lineage include a wide jaw and large teeth that get bigger toward the back of the mouth.) from only four to six generations earlier. All genes from Neanderthals in the current human population are descended from Neanderthal fathers and human mothers.

== Mythology ==
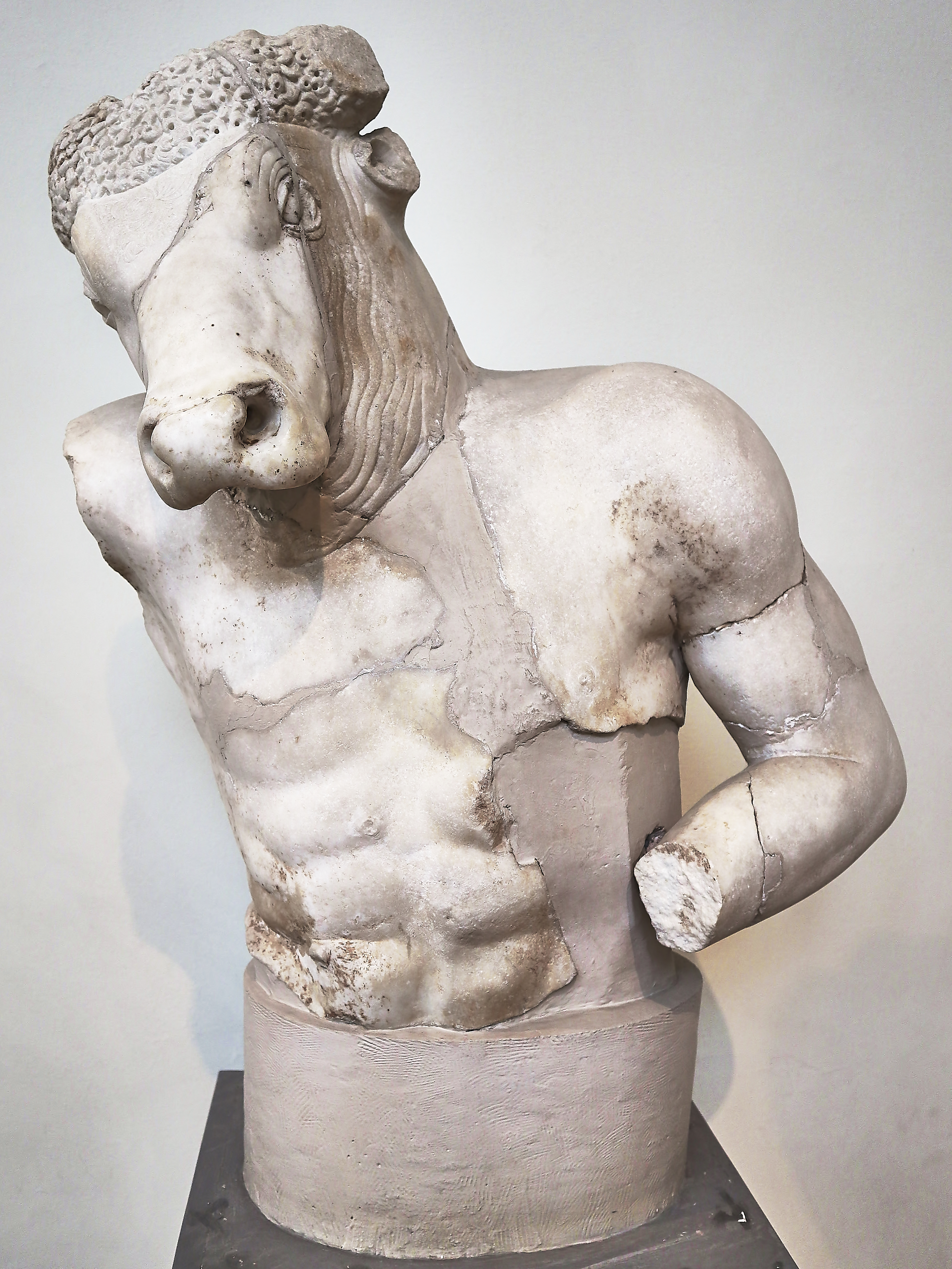
The Minotaur of ancient Greek mythology was (in one version of the myth) supposedly the offspring of Pasiphaë and a white bull.

Folk tales and myths sometimes contain mythological hybrids; the Minotaur was the offspring of a human, Pasiphaë, and a white bull. More often, they are composites of the physical attributes of two or more kinds of animals, mythical beasts, and humans, with no suggestion that they are the result of interbreeding, as in the centaur (man/horse), chimera (goat/lion/snake), hippocamp (fish/horse), and sphinx (woman/lion). The Old Testament mentions a first generation of half-human hybrid giants, the Nephilim, while the apocryphal Book of Enoch describes the Nephilim as the wicked sons of fallen angels and attractive women.

== See also ==
- AquAdvantage salmon
- Bird hybrid
- Canid hybrid
- Chimera (genetics)
- Chimera (virus)
- Chloroplast capture (botany)
- Cloning vector
- Eukaryote hybrid genome
- Endogenous retrovirus
- Endogenous viral element
- Retrotransposon
- Endosymbiont
- Endosymbiotic theory
- Endogenization
- Retrovirus
- Reticulate evolution
- Felid hybrids
- Genetic admixture
- Genetic erosion
- Graft hybrid
- Graft-chimaera
- Grex (horticulture)
- Hybridity
- Hybrid speciation
- Intergradation
- Hybridogenesis
- Hybrid incompatibility
- Hybrot
- Inbreeding
- Interbreeding between archaic and modern humans
- Breed
- Breeding back
- Backcrossing
- Interspecific pregnancy
- Xenotransplantation – Transplantation of cells or tissue across species
- Xenotransfusion – Transfer of blood from one animal's veins into another's
- Horizontal gene transfer
- Inferring horizontal gene transfer
- Gene transfer agent
- GloFish
- Agrobacterium, a bacterium well known for its ability to transfer DNA between itself and plants.
- Gene delivery
- Genetically modified organism
- List of plant hybrids
- List of genetic hybrids
- Macropod hybrids
- Purebred
- Selective breeding
- Symbiogenesis
- Genetic use restriction technology
- Gynogenesis
- Multiregional origin of modern humans
- Transduction (genetics)
- Transgenesis
- Outcrossing
- Outbreeding depression
- Provirus
- Reproductive isolation
