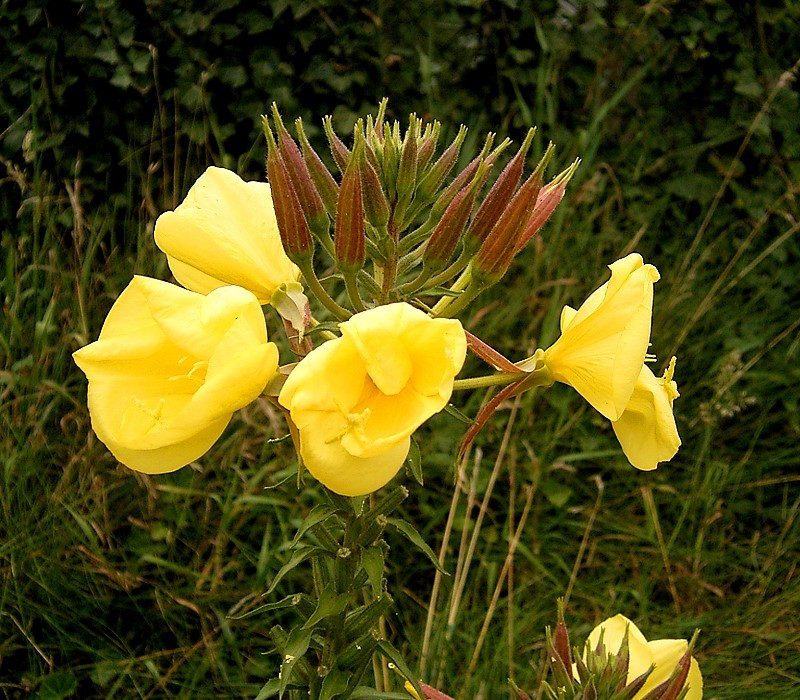

Scientific classification
- Kingdom: Plantae
- Clade: Tracheophytes
- Clade: Angiosperms
- Clade: Eudicots
- Clade: Rosids
- Order: Myrtales
- Family: Onagraceae
- Genus: Oenothera
- Species: O. glazioviana

Binomial name
- Oenothera glazioviana Micheli

Synonyms
- Oenothera erythrosepala (Borbás) Borbás; Oenothera lamarckiana Ser.; Many others

= Oenothera glazioviana =

Species of flowering plant

Oenothera glazioviana is a species of flowering plant in the evening primrose family known by the common names large-flowered evening-primrose and redsepal evening primrose. Oenothera lamarckiana was formerly believed to be a distinct species, but is now regarded as a synonym of Oe. glazioviana. Oenothera glazioviana can be found in scattered locations worldwide as an introduced species and in some locations behaves as an invasive species. It has long been cultivated as an ornamental plant.

== Description ==
Oenothera glazioviana is generally a biennial herb producing an erect stem approaching 1.5 metres (4.9 ft) in maximum height. It is roughly hairy in texture, the hairs with reddish blistering or glandular bases. The crinkly leaves are up to 15 centimeters long.

The inflorescence is a showy spike of many large flowers. When in bud the long red sepals are visible. When in bloom each flower has four bright yellow petals up to 5 centimeters long which fade orange to red with age. The fruit is a lance-shaped capsule 2 or 3 centimeters long.

== Taxonomy ==
Oenothera glazioviana was first described by Marc Micheli in 1875. This species is of hybrid origin from a cross between two North American species, Oenothera elata and Oenothera grandiflora in Europe. It was soon introduced to the horticultural trade and spread rapidly around the world.

=== Oenothera lamarckiana ===
About a century ago, it was believed that there was a different species, either native to some obscure and unknown place in North America, from which it had quickly spread across the world, or more likely a new species which had very recently evolved in the last few decades, possibly in Europe from a hybrid of two other species, and thence had become a common weed. These theories stemmed from the fact that although the species was now a common species, and while an obviously striking species unlikely to be overlooked by botanists, it had only been recorded in recent times, and never in a truly wild state. At the time this taxon was important for the brand new study of genetics, the debate about the cause of evolution, whether that was natural selection or one of the alternatives such as mutationism, and particularly to the discovery of polyploidy. It was later discovered that it had, in fact, already been discovered and described by a botanist in Brazil only a few decades beforehand, in 1875, as Oenothera glazioviana, and had likely spread across the world from there since then, but this had apparently somehow been overlooked.

== Distribution ==
Oenothera glazioviana arose as a garden hybrid between Oenothera elata and Oenothera grandiflora in Europe. It is cultivated as an ornamental plant, and has become naturalized in many countries around the world, like Britain and Ireland, where it is the most common species of its genus.

== Ecology ==
Under the synonym Oenothera lamarckiana, it is described as a very adaptable plant: however it needs full sun, average moisture, and well-drained soils. It is easily grown from seed. It began being grown in European gardens during the 1800s.

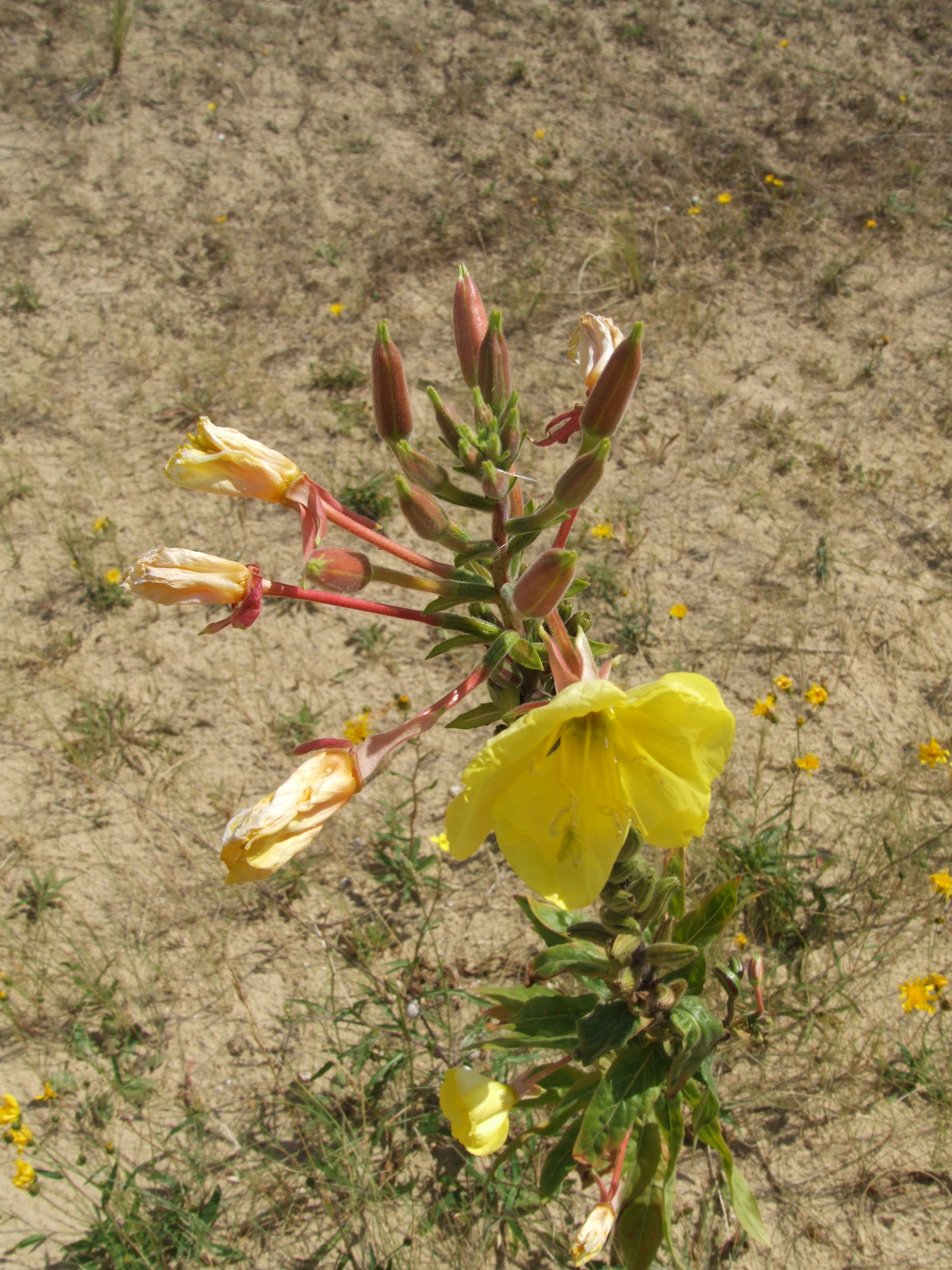
Oenothera glazioviana

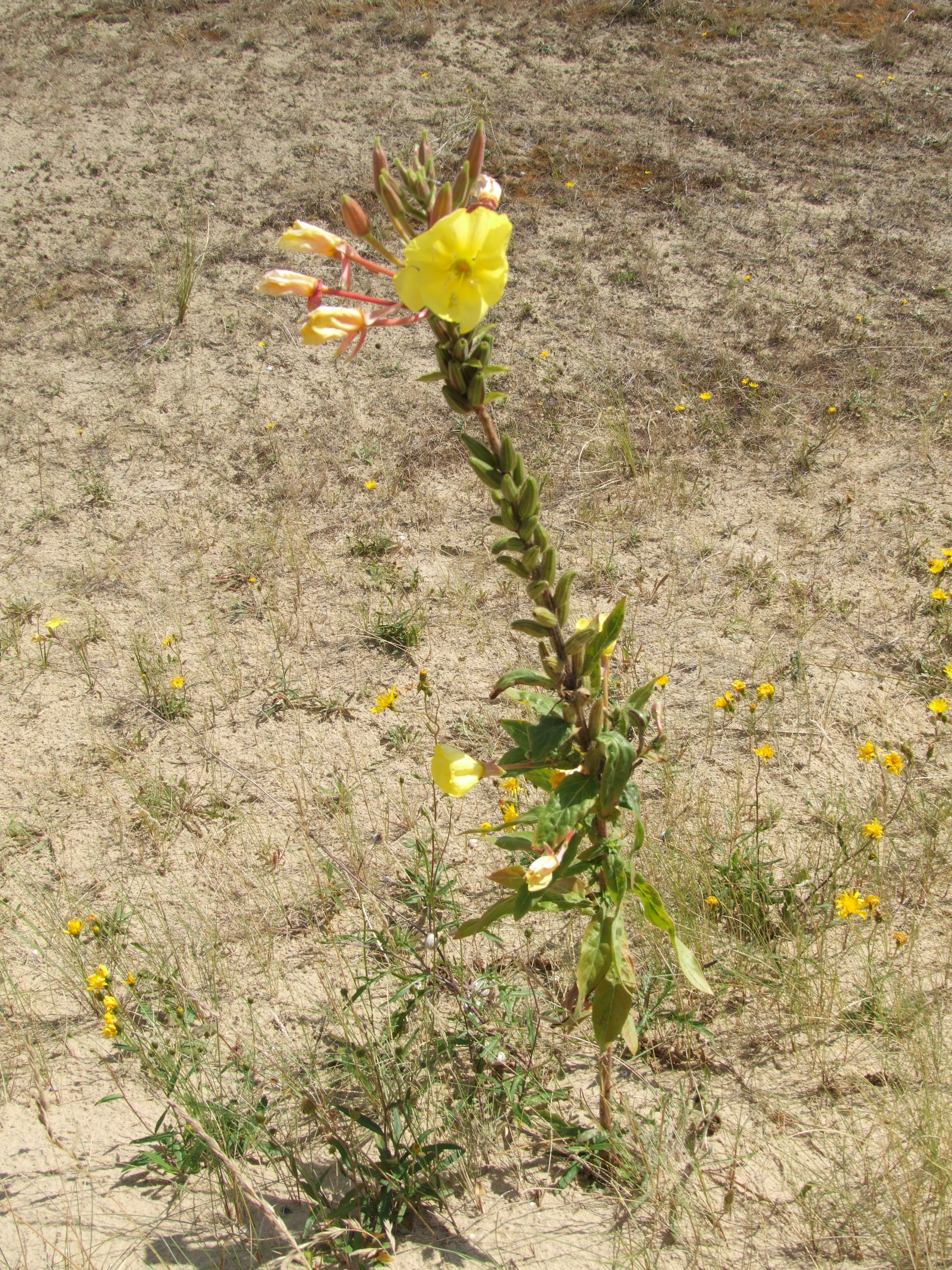
Oenothera glazioviana

Video of blooming in real-time
