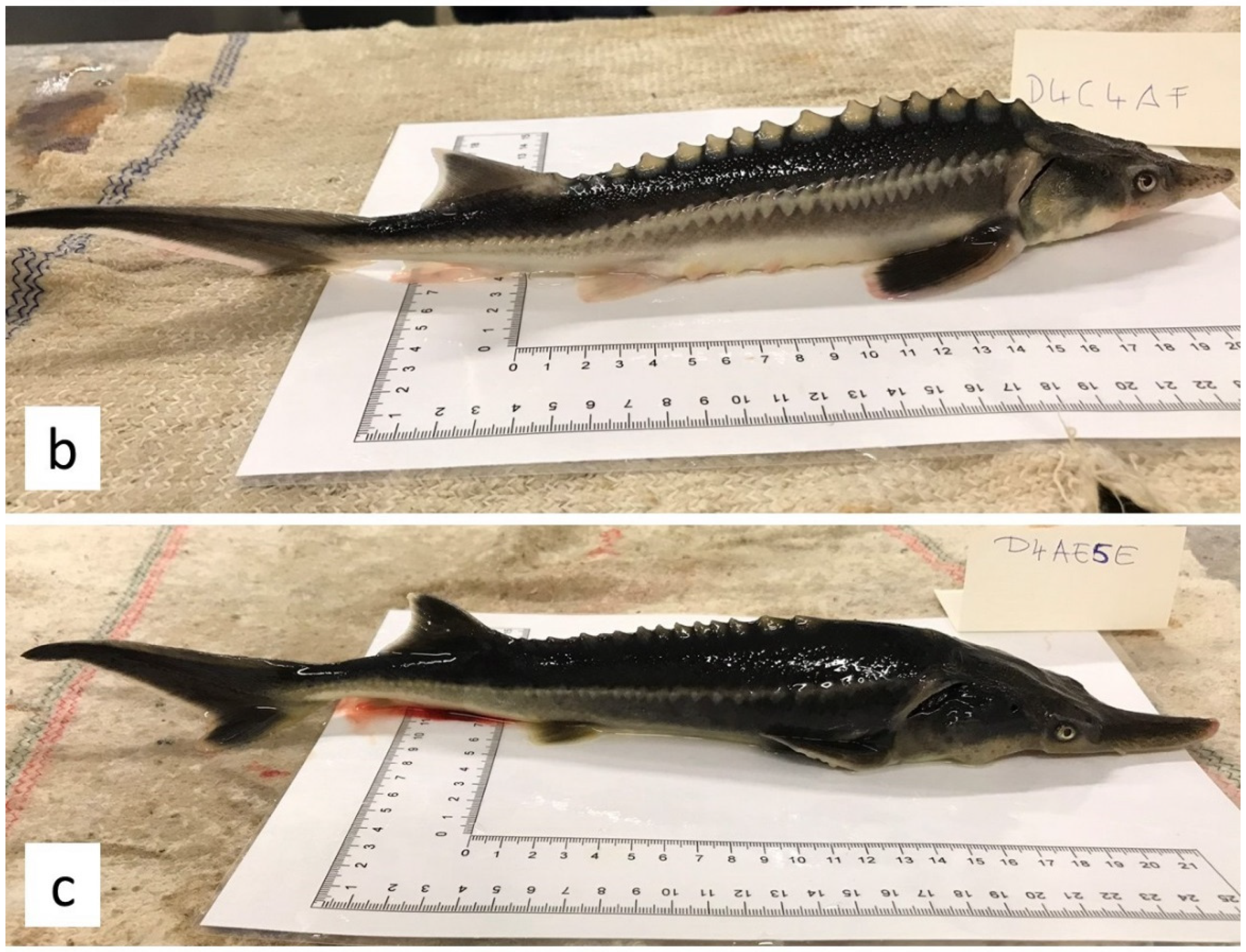
- Two sturddlefish phenotypes from the resulting hybridization

Scientific classification
- Kingdom: Animalia
- Phylum: Chordata
- Class: Actinopterygii
- Subclass: Chondrostei
- Order: Acipenseriformes
- Species: A. Polyodon spathula × A. Huso gueldenstaedtii

= Sturddlefish =

Hybrid basal ray-finned fish

The sturddlefish is a hybrid of the American paddlefish (Polyodon spathula) and the Russian sturgeon (Huso gueldenstaedtii), accidentally created by researchers in 2019 and announced in 2020. Obtaining living hybrids through breeding individuals from different families is unusual, especially given that the two species' last common ancestor lived over at least 141.4 million years ago based on mitochondrial DNA sequence.

The hybrids were created accidentally during attempts to induce gynogenesis, a type of parthenogenic reproduction where a sperm cell must be present to trigger embryogenesis but does not genetically contribute to the offspring. Hundreds of hybrid fish were created, of which about two-thirds survived over one month, and about 100 survived for one year. As of July 2020, all living hybrid fish are in captivity at the research lab in Hungary. In 2024 a Hungarian research group, including some of the authors of the 2020 study, raised sturddlefish to 40 months old and measured the development of their reproductive organs to determine their potential fertility.

== Background ==
Both the American paddlefish and the Russian sturgeon are endangered species. Researchers in Hungary conducted experiments designed to test if either species could be bred in captivity. As part of these experiments, an attempt was made to induce gynogenesis with each species. During the course of the experiments, the researchers used sperm from paddlefish fathers instead of sperm from sturgeons to act as a control in the fertilizing of female sturgeons. The researchers were surprised when viable offspring resulted.

A 2020 study estimated that the lineages of sturgeons and paddlefish diverged 155 million years ago, during the Late Jurassic. For this reason, the potential for a hybrid between these two species was not initially considered by the researchers, who later speculated that in spite of the long time span that there were relatively few genetic changes between the species. Both fish have been called "living fossils" due to their slow evolution over time. The American paddlefish is the only species of paddlefish living after the extinction of the Chinese paddlefish, which was estimated to be extinct by 2005, and no later than by 2010. Sturgeons are considered by IUCN to be the most critically endangered group of species in the world based on over 85% of sturgeon species being at risk of extinction.

== Description ==
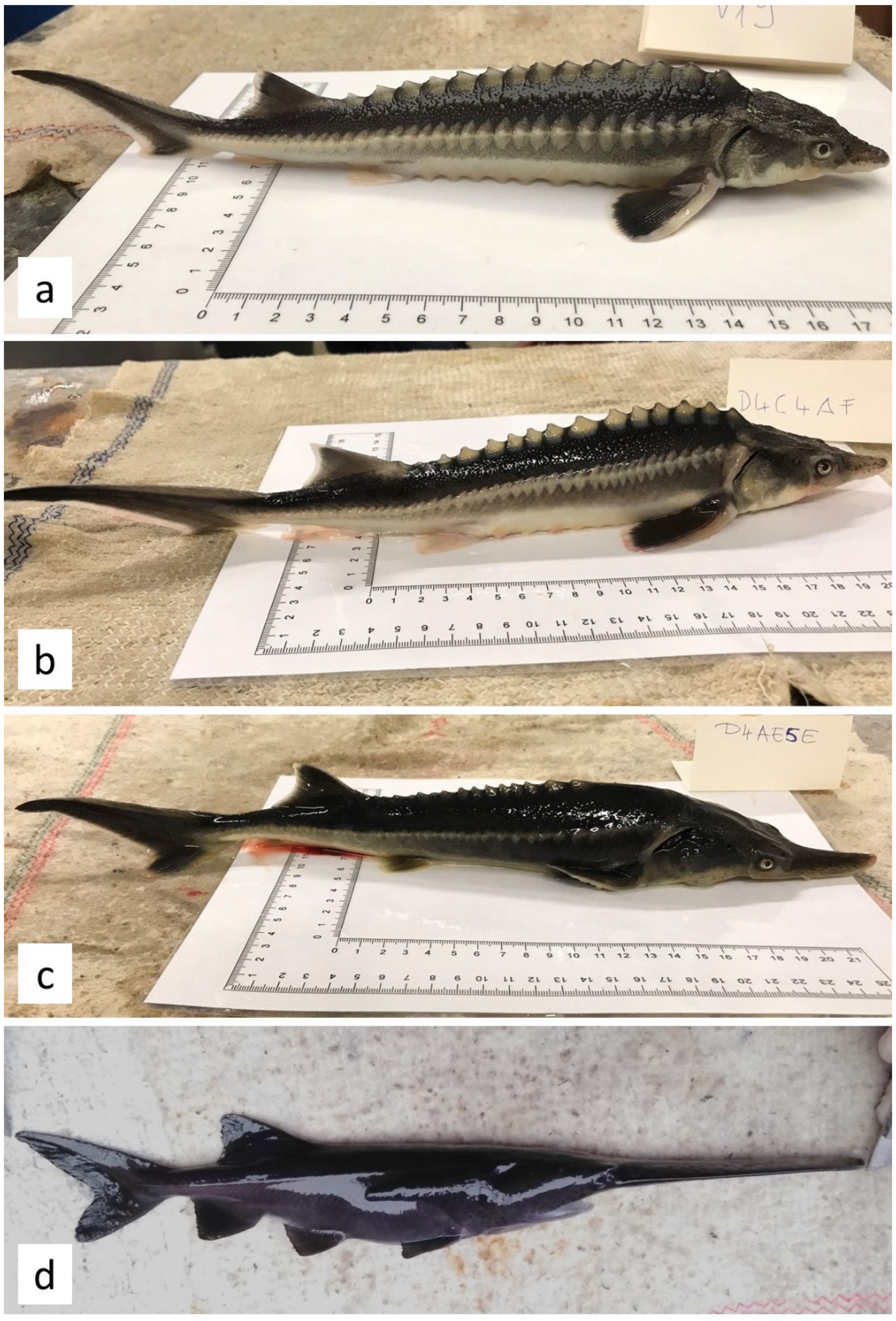
Yearlings of the Russian sturgeon (a), American paddlefish (d), and two of their hybrids (b and c). (b) is a typical hybrid with a larger genome, and (c) is a typical hybrid with a smaller genome.

Two distinct groups of hybrids were formed. Individuals in the first group (Fish C) have approximately equal amounts of DNA from each species, and display approximately equal amounts of physical characteristics from each of their parents. Members of the other group (Fish B) contained approximately twice as much sturgeon DNA due to chromosome doubling, and for this reason have physical appearances more similar to sturgeons.

The 2024 research found that while most offspring are likely sterile (as expected), one of the six 40-month-old fish has typically developing testis. Therefore, "the presence of fertile or semi-fertile male hybrid individuals cannot be ruled out."

== Potential ==
The sturddlefish may have the potential to reduce the carbon footprint and cost of feeding farm fish cultivated for caviar production, among other aims. However, due to the hybrids' likely sterility, that is probably not an option. Because of this, along with the unknown effects that the sturddlefish could have on ecosystems, the researchers who created the sturddlefish initially decided not to create more, but did go on to breed a small number of additional fish in 2022 for a study examining the hybrids' potential fertility.
