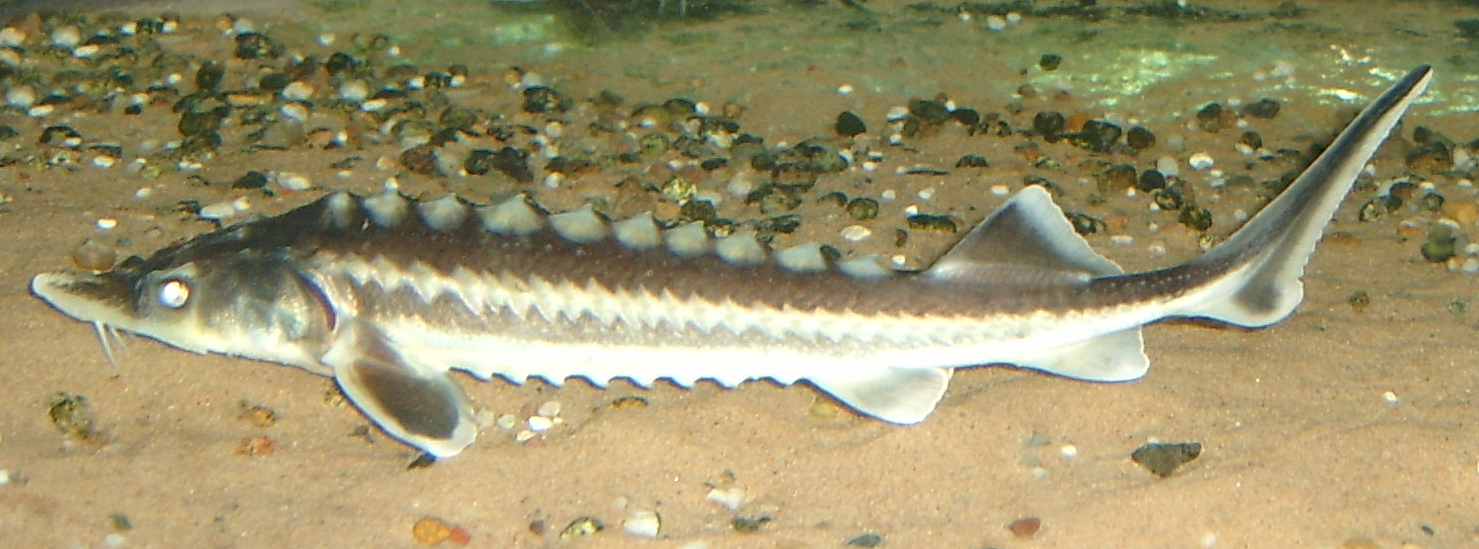

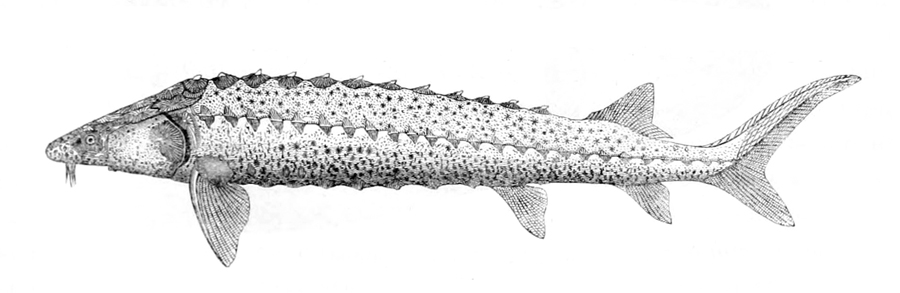

Conservation status
- Critically Endangered (IUCN 3.1)
- CITES Appendix II

Scientific classification
- Kingdom: Animalia
- Phylum: Chordata
- Class: Actinopterygii
- Order: Acipenseriformes
- Family: Acipenseridae
- Genus: Huso
- Species: H. gueldenstaedtii

Binomial name
- Huso gueldenstaedtii (von Brandt & Ratzeburg 1833)

Synonyms
- Acipenser pygmaeus Reisinger 1830 non – Pallas 1814; Acipenser aculeatus Lovetsky 1834; Acipenser medius Heckel 1836; Acipenser tueckus Heckel 1836; Acipenser macrophthalmus Heckel 1836; Acipenser brevirostris Heckel 1836 non – Lesueur 1818; Acipenser gueldenstaedtii var. scobar Antipa 1909; Acipenser gueldenstaedti scaber Antipa 1909; Acipenser gueldenstaedti var. golis Antipa 1909; Acipenser gueldenstaedti var. longirostris Antipa 1909; Acipenser gueldenstaedti var. acutirostris Antipa 1909 non – Ayres 1854; Acipenser gueldenstaedtii var. colchicus Marti 1940; Acipenser colchicus (Marti 1940); Acipenser gueldenstaedtii colchicus (Marti 1940); Acipenser gueldenstaedti var. tanaica Marti 1940; Acipenser gueldenstaedti colchicus n. danubicus Movchan 1967; Acipenser gueldenstaedti persicus n. kurensis Belyaeff 1932

= Russian sturgeon =

Species of fish

The Russian sturgeon (Huso gueldenstaedtii), also known as the diamond sturgeon or Danube sturgeon, is a species of fish in the family Acipenseridae. It is found in Azerbaijan, Bulgaria, Georgia, Iran, Kazakhstan, Romania, Russia, Turkey, Turkmenistan, and Ukraine. It is also found in the Caspian Sea. This fish can grow up to about 235 cm (93 in) and weigh 115 kg (254 lb). Russian sturgeon mature and reproduce slowly, making them highly vulnerable to fishing.

Prior to 2025, it was placed in the genus Acipenser, but this placement was found to be paraphyletic, and it is more accurately placed in the genus Huso.

== Description ==
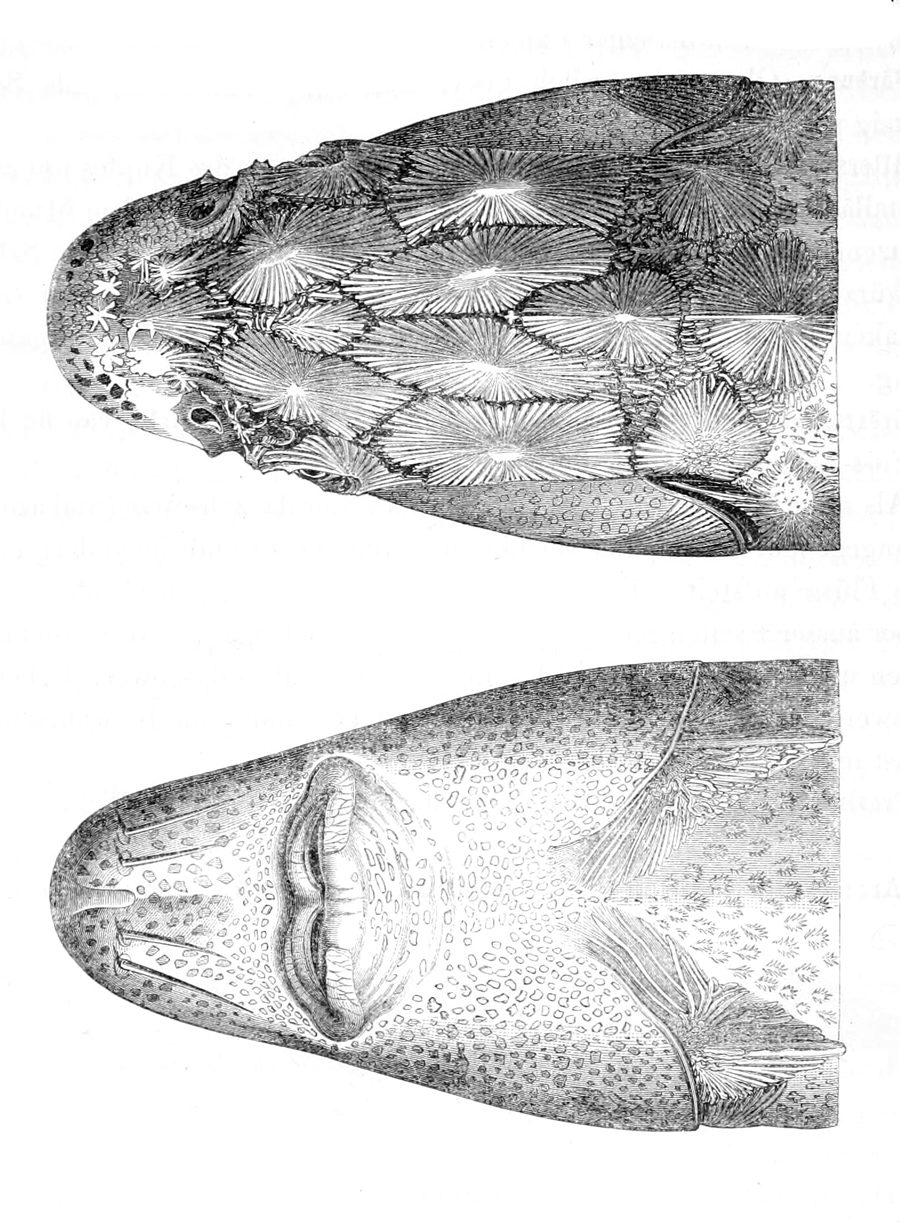
Upper and lower side of head

The Russian sturgeon can grow to 210 cm (83 in) but a more normal size is 110 to 140 cm (43 to 55 in). It has a relatively short and rounded snout with three pairs of unfringed barbels closer to the tip of the snout that to the mouth. The dorsal fin has 27 to 48 soft rays and the anal fin has 16 to 35. The number of scales along the lateral line varies from 21 to 50. This fish can be distinguish from the otherwise similar starry sturgeon by the shape of its snout, its barbels and scale arrangement. The upper surface is greyish-green, the lateral scales are pale and the belly white.

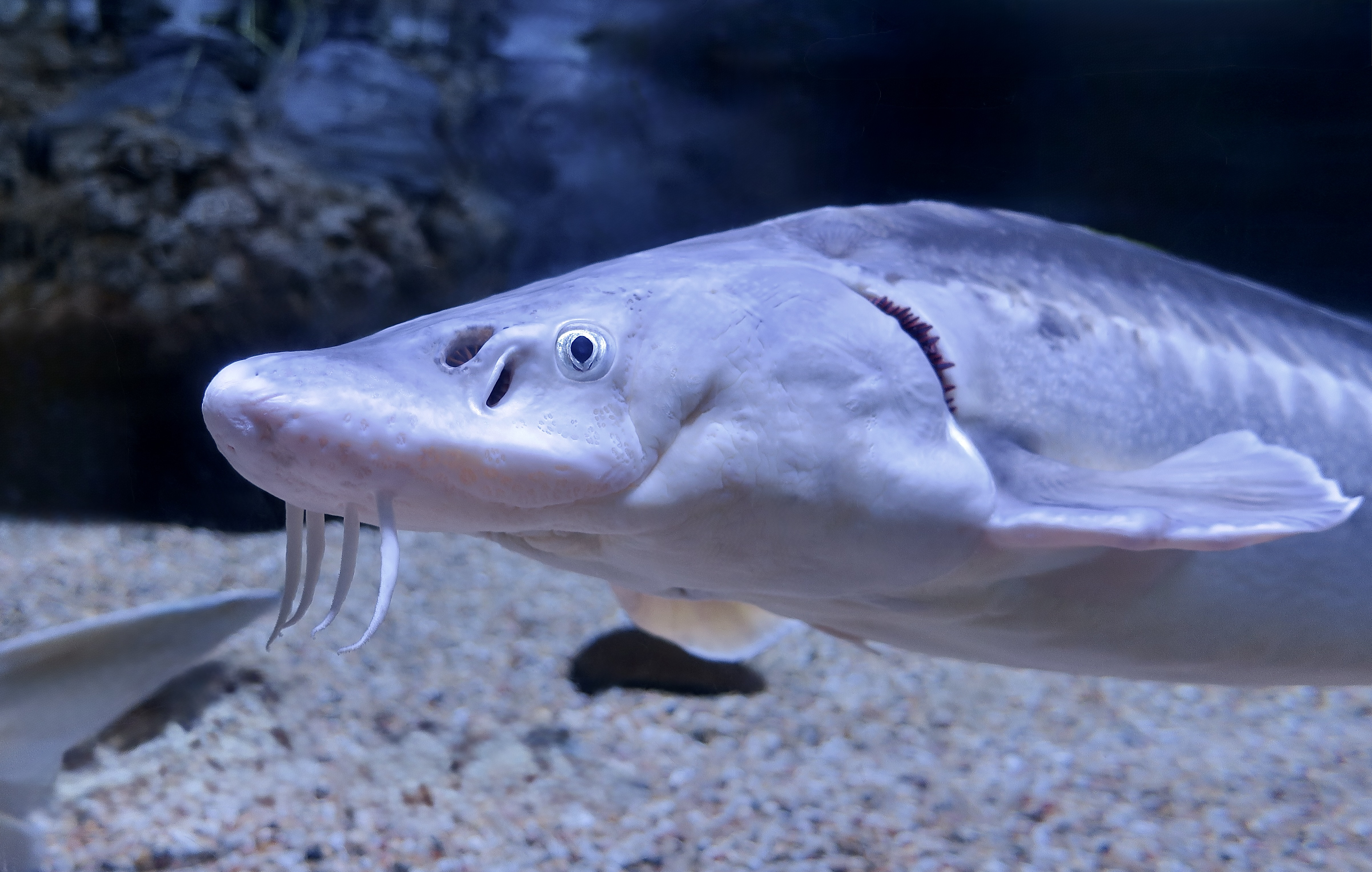
A Russian sturgeon at OdySea Aquarium.

== Distribution and habitat ==
The Russian sturgeon is native to the Black Sea, the Sea of Azov and the Caspian Sea. It is an anadromous fish and moves into the river systems that drain into these seas in order to make its way to spawning areas upstream. It is usually found near the bottom in fairly shallow water over sandy or muddy substrates.

== Biology ==
The Russian sturgeon feeds on crustaceans, molluscs and small fishes such as gobies, anchovies and sprats. It is solitary when in the sea but becomes gregarious as it moves up-river in April, May and June to spawn.

== Hybrid ==
In a paper published in July 2020, eggs from three Russian sturgeons were crossbred with American paddlefish using sperm from four male paddlefishes, resulting in successful hybrids called sturddlefish. The resulting offspring had a survival rate of 62% to 74% and on average reached 1 kg (2.2 lb) after a year of growth. This is the first time such fish from different genera and families successfully were crossbred.

== See also ==
- Beluga (which lives in the same area and is famous for its roe – caviar)

== Sources ==
- Froese, Rainer; Pauly, Daniel (eds.). "Acipenser gueldenstaedtii". FishBase. June 2011 version.
