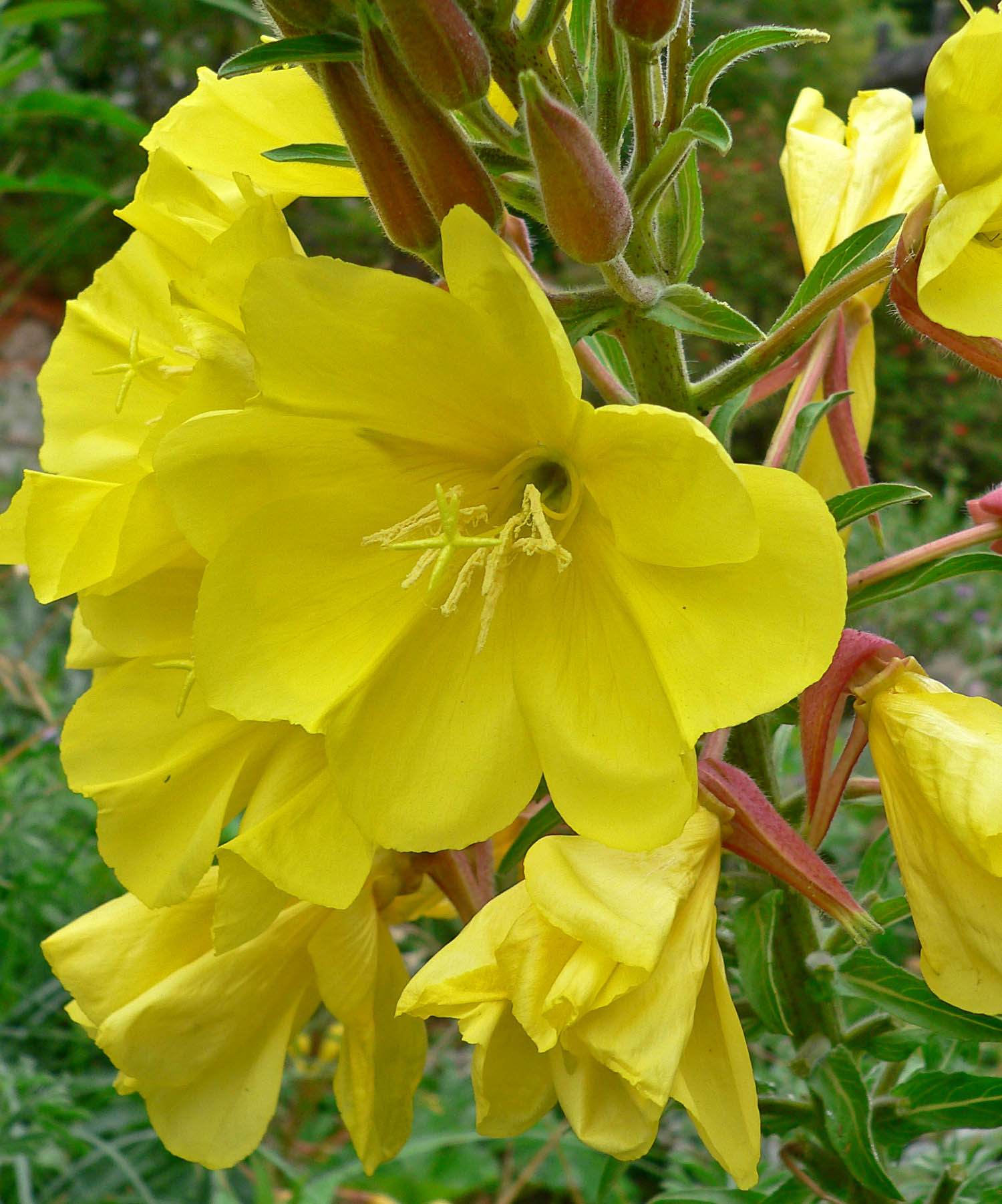
- Oenothera elata subsp. hookeri

Conservation status
- Secure (NatureServe)

Scientific classification
- Kingdom: Plantae
- Clade: Tracheophytes
- Clade: Angiosperms
- Clade: Eudicots
- Clade: Rosids
- Order: Myrtales
- Family: Onagraceae
- Genus: Oenothera
- Species: O. elata

Binomial name
- Oenothera elata Kunth

Subspecies
- O. e. subsp. elata; O. e. subsp. hirsutissima; O. e. subsp. hookeri

= Oenothera elata =

Plant species in the evening primrose family

Oenothera elata is a species of Oenothera belonging to the family Onagraceae, known by the common name Hooker's evening primrose or tall evening primrose. Subspecies include hookeri, hirsutissima, longisima, jamesii, villosa and elata. It is native to much of western and central North America. The plants are quite tall, especially the hookeri subspecies, native to California, which can reach about 1.8 meters (6 feet) height. The plants are found along roadsides, in moist meadows, or in woodland, from sea level up to 9,000 ft (2,700 m) in elevation.

== Description ==
The stout, usually reddish stem has many long, narrow leaves, above a basal rosette. At its top is a large, open cluster of 2- to 4-inch wide yellow flowers with 4 large petals and protruding yellow stamens and 4-branched pistil, often covered in sticky pollen. The fragrant flowers open at dusk and wilt the next morning, turning orange or red.

== Taxonomy ==
Oenothera elata was scientifically described and given its accepted name by Carl Sigismund Kunth in 1823. It has 50 synonyms of the species or one of its three subspecies according to Plants of the World Online.

Table of Synonyms
Name	Year	Rank	Synonym of:	Notes
Oenothera biennis f. hookeri (Torr. & A.Gray) B.Boivin	1966	form	subsp. hookeri	≡ hom.
Oenothera biennis var. hirsutissima A.Gray ex S.Watson	1873	variety	subsp. hirsutissima	≡ hom.
Oenothera biennis var. hookeri (Torr. & A.Gray) B.Boivin	1967	variety	subsp. hookeri	≡ hom.
Oenothera communis var. hookeri (Torr. & A.Gray) H.Lév.	1909	variety	subsp. hookeri	≡ hom.
Oenothera corymbosa Sims	1818	species	subsp. hirsutissima	= het., nom. illeg.
Oenothera elata var. hirsutissima (A.Gray) Cronquist	1997	variety	subsp. hirsutissima	≡ hom.
Oenothera elata subsp. texensis W.Dietr. & W.L.Wagner	1987	subspecies	subsp. hirsutissima	= het.
Oenothera franciscana Bartlett	1914	species	subsp. hookeri	= het.
Oenothera grisea (Bartlett) Rostański	1985	species	subsp. hirsutissima	= het., nom. illeg.
Oenothera guttata (Greene ex R.R.Gates) R.R.Gates	1933	species	subsp. hirsutissima	= het., nom. illeg.
Oenothera hewettii Cockerell	1919	species	subsp. hirsutissima	= het.
Oenothera hirsutissima (A.Gray ex S.Watson) de Vries	1901	species	subsp. hirsutissima	≡ hom.
Oenothera hookeri Torr. & A.Gray	1840	species	subsp. hookeri	≡ hom.
Oenothera hookeri subsp. angustifolia (R.R.Gates) Munz	1949	subspecies	subsp. hirsutissima	= het.
Oenothera hookeri var. angustifolia R.R.Gates	1915	variety	subsp. hirsutissima	= het.
Oenothera hookeri subsp. euhookeri Munz	1949	subspecies	subsp. hookeri	≡ hom., not validly publ.
Oenothera hookeri var. euhookeri Munz	1949	variety	subsp. hookeri	≡ hom., not validly publ.
Oenothera hookeri var. franciscana (Bartlett) R.R.Gates	1957	variety	subsp. hookeri	= het.
Oenothera hookeri subsp. grisea (Bartlett) Munz	1949	subspecies	subsp. hirsutissima	= het.
Oenothera hookeri subsp. hewettii Cockerell	1913	subspecies	subsp. hirsutissima	= het.
Oenothera hookeri var. hewettii (Cockerell) R.R.Gates	1957	variety	subsp. hirsutissima	= het.
Oenothera hookeri subsp. hirsutissima (A.Gray ex S.Watson) Munz	1949	subspecies	subsp. hirsutissima	≡ hom.
Oenothera hookeri var. hirsutissima (A.Gray ex S.Watson) Munz	1939	variety	subsp. hirsutissima	≡ hom.
Oenothera hookeri var. irrigua (Wooton & Standl.) R.R.Gates	1915	variety	subsp. hirsutissima	= het.
Oenothera hookeri subsp. montereyensis Munz	1949	subspecies	subsp. hookeri	= het.
Oenothera hookeri var. montereyensis (Munz) Hoover	1970	variety	subsp. hookeri	= het.
Oenothera hookeri subsp. ornata (A.Nelson) Munz	1949	subspecies	subsp. hirsutissima	= het.
Oenothera hookeri var. ornata (A.Nelson) Munz	1949	variety	subsp. hirsutissima	= het.
Oenothera hookeri var. semiglabra R.R.Gates	1915	variety	subsp. hirsutissima	= het.
Oenothera hookeri var. simsiana (Ser.) R.R.Gates	1957	variety	subsp. hirsutissima	= het.
Oenothera hookeri subsp. venusta (Bartlett) Munz	1949	subspecies	subsp. hirsutissima	= het.
Oenothera irrigua Wooton & Standl.	1913	species	subsp. hirsutissima	= het.
Oenothera jepsonii Greene	1891	species	subsp. hirsutissima	= het.
Oenothera macbrideae (A.Nelson) A.Heller	1913	species	subsp. hirsutissima	= het.
Oenothera macbrideae var. ornata (A.Nelson) R.R.Gates	1957	variety	subsp. hirsutissima	= het.
Oenothera montereyensis (Munz) Rostański	1985	species	subsp. hookeri	= het.
Oenothera ornata (A.Nelson) Rydb.	1913	species	subsp. hirsutissima	= het.
Oenothera salicifolia Desf. ex Lehm.	1824	species	subsp. elata	= het., nom. illeg.
Oenothera simsiana Ser.	1828	species	subsp. hirsutissima	= het.
Oenothera spectabilis Spach	1835	species	subsp. hirsutissima	= het., nom. illeg.
Oenothera venusta Bartlett	1914	species	subsp. hirsutissima	= het.
Oenothera venusta var. grisea Bartlett	1914	variety	subsp. hirsutissima	= het.
Onagra elata (Kunth) Bartl.	1838	species	O. elata	≡ hom.
Onagra guttata Greene ex R.R.Gates	1915	species	subsp. hirsutissima	= het.
Onagra hookeri (Torr. & A.Gray) Small	1896	species	subsp. hookeri	≡ hom.
Onagra kunthiana Spach	1835	species	subsp. elata	= het.
Onagra macbrideae A.Nelson	1911	species	subsp. hirsutissima	= het.
Onagra ornata A.Nelson	1911	species	subsp. hirsutissima	= het.
Onagra salicifolia Spach	1835	species	subsp. elata	= het.
Onagra spectabilis Spach	1835	species	subsp. hirsutissima	= het.
Notes: ≡ homotypic synonym; = heterotypic synonym

== Uses ==
The Zuni people apply a poultice of the powdered flower of the hookeri subspecies and saliva at night to swellings.

== Gallery ==
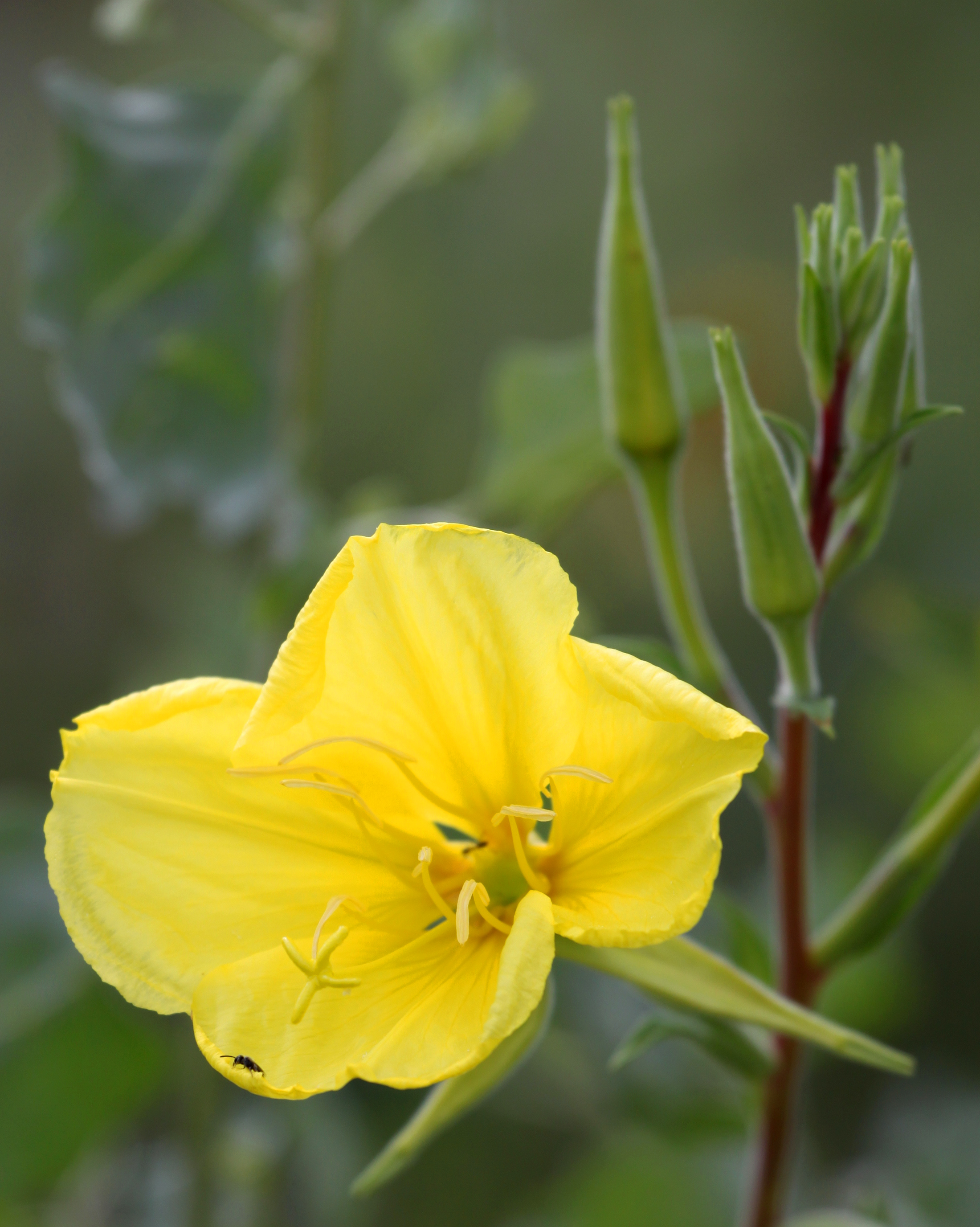
Oenothera elata (Hooker's evening primrose), Irvine CA

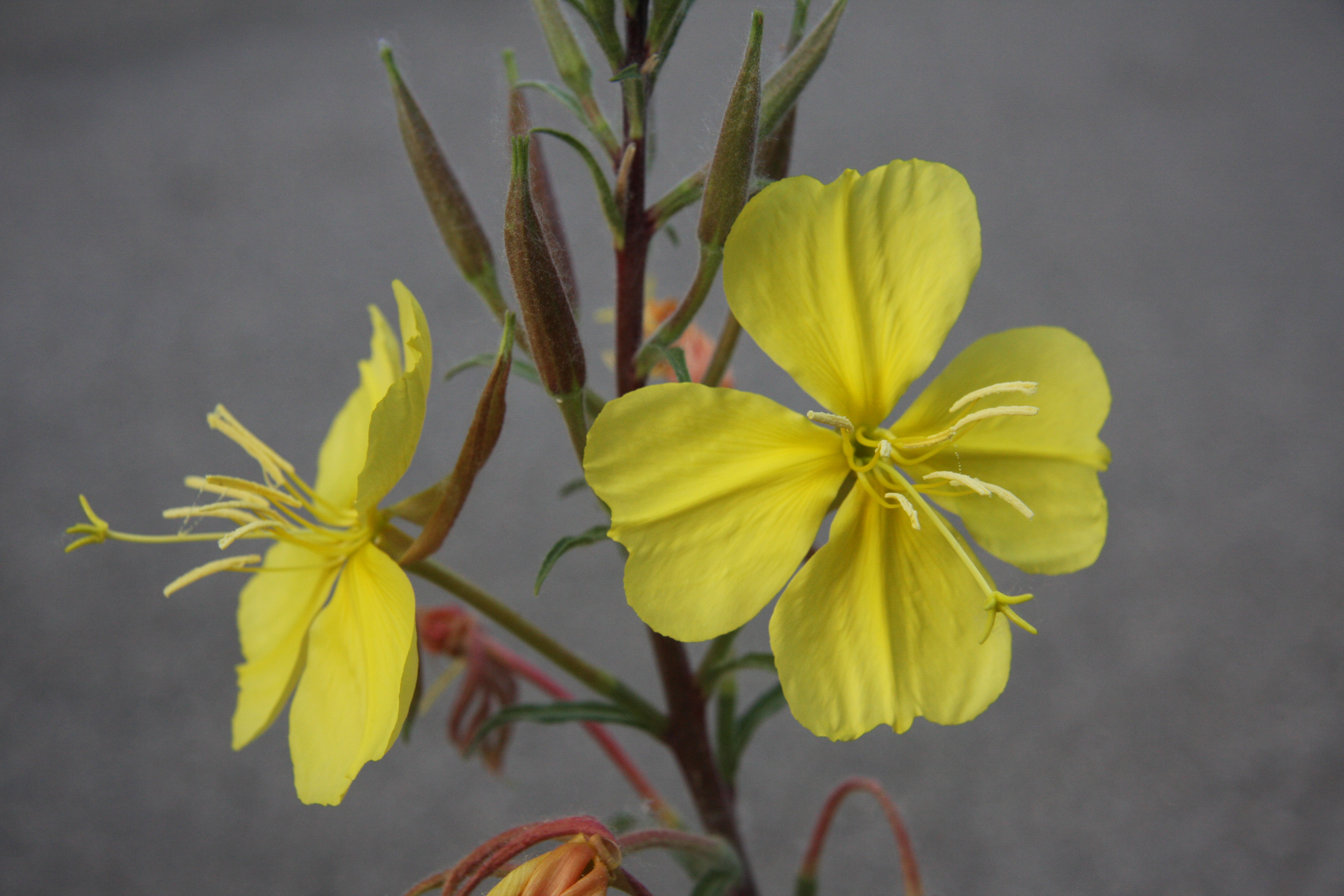
Oenothera elata flowers, Eastern Sierra, CA

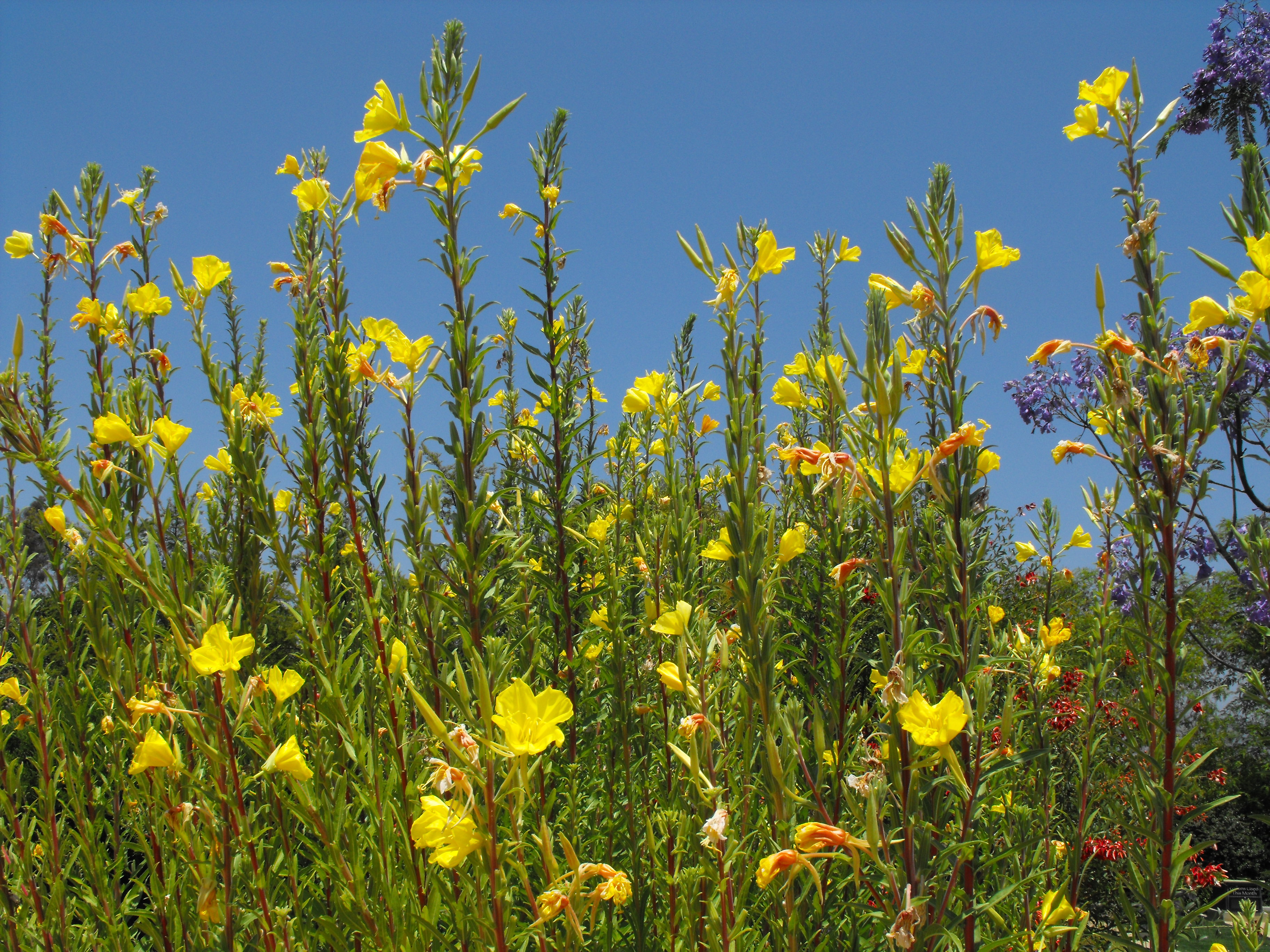
E. elata var hookeri, Water Conservation Garden, El Cajon CA

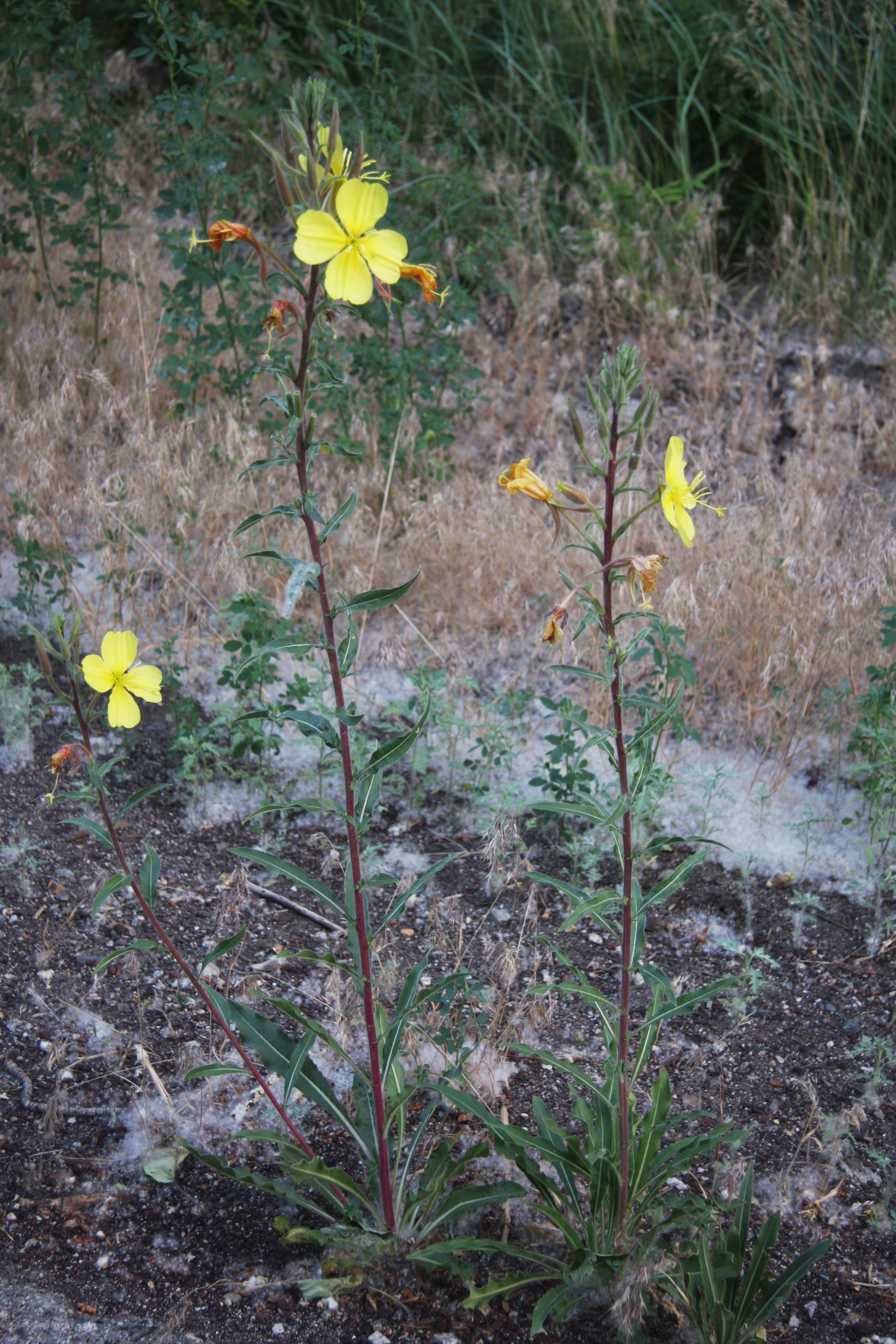
Oenothera elata: basal & stem leaves, reddish stems, large yellow flowers, & drying orange-red flowers
