= Prunus persica × Prunus americana =

Scientific classification
- Kingdom: Plantae
- Clade: Tracheophytes
- Clade: Angiosperms
- Clade: Eudicots
- Clade: Rosids
- Order: Rosales
- Family: Rosaceae
- Tribe: Amygdaleae
- Genus: Prunus
- Species: P. persica × P. americana

American tree hybrid in fruticulture

Prunus persica × Prunus americana is the hybrid between the peach Prunus persica (often a nectarine) and the wild American plum Prunus americana.

Hybrids were obtained in the 1940s at the University of Minnesota, and have been used in subsequent breeding, such as in the parentage of a plum called 'Minnesota No. 31221'. In that work, hybrids were also obtained between the Canadian wild plum (Prunus nigra) and the peach.

Another such hybrid was produced at an orchard near Broadus, Montana in the mid 1980s. The nectarine was the pollen parent. A leaf from this tree is included in the Purdue University book "Fruit Breeding", Volume 1. The hybrid at Broadus, Montana has never fruited as the flowerbuds have all winterkilled. The hybrid has bloomed in Pennsylvania and the blooms are sterile. As of 2013, the hybrid near Broadus is still alive.

== See also ==
- Peacotum, a marketing name for some peach-plum-apricot hybrids
