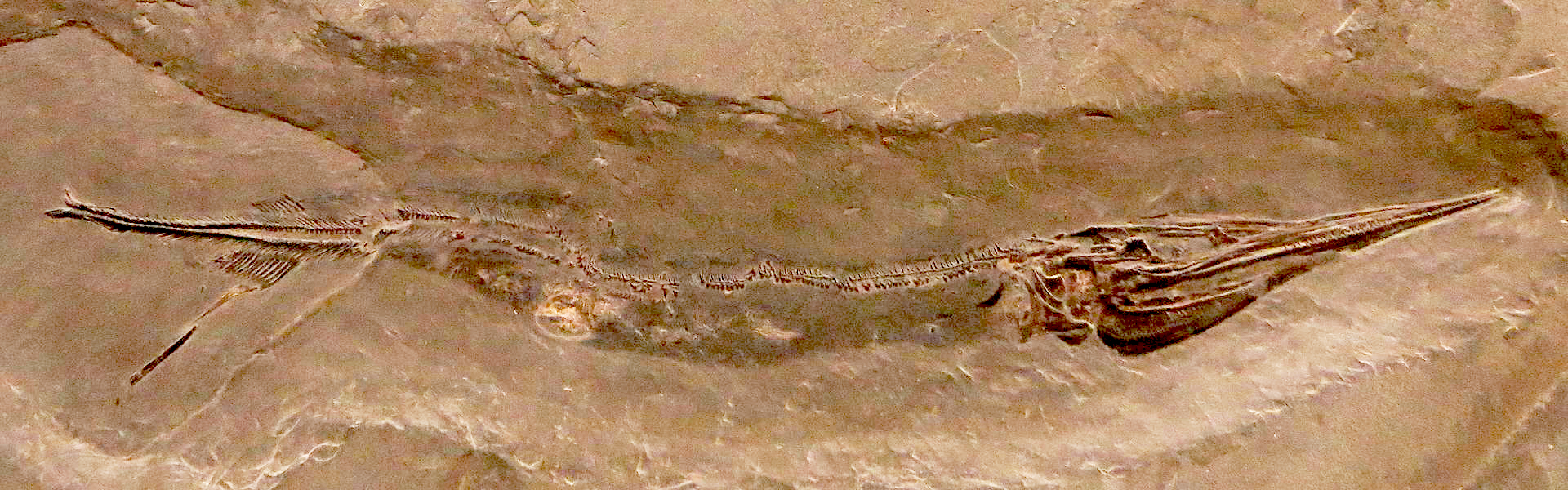
- Saurorhynchus brevirostris fossil

Scientific classification
- Domain: Eukaryota
- Kingdom: Animalia
- Phylum: Chordata
- Class: Actinopterygii
- Order: †Saurichthyiformes
- Family: †Saurichthyidae
- Genus: †Saurorhynchus; Reis, 1892

Type species
- †Saurorhynchus acutus (Agassiz, 1844)

Other species
- †Saurorhynchus anningae †Saurorhynchus brevirostris †Saurorhynchus hauffi

Synonyms
- Acidorhynchus Stensiö, 1925

= Saurorhynchus =

Saurorhynchus Temporal range: Sinemurian-Aalenian

Extinct genus of fishes

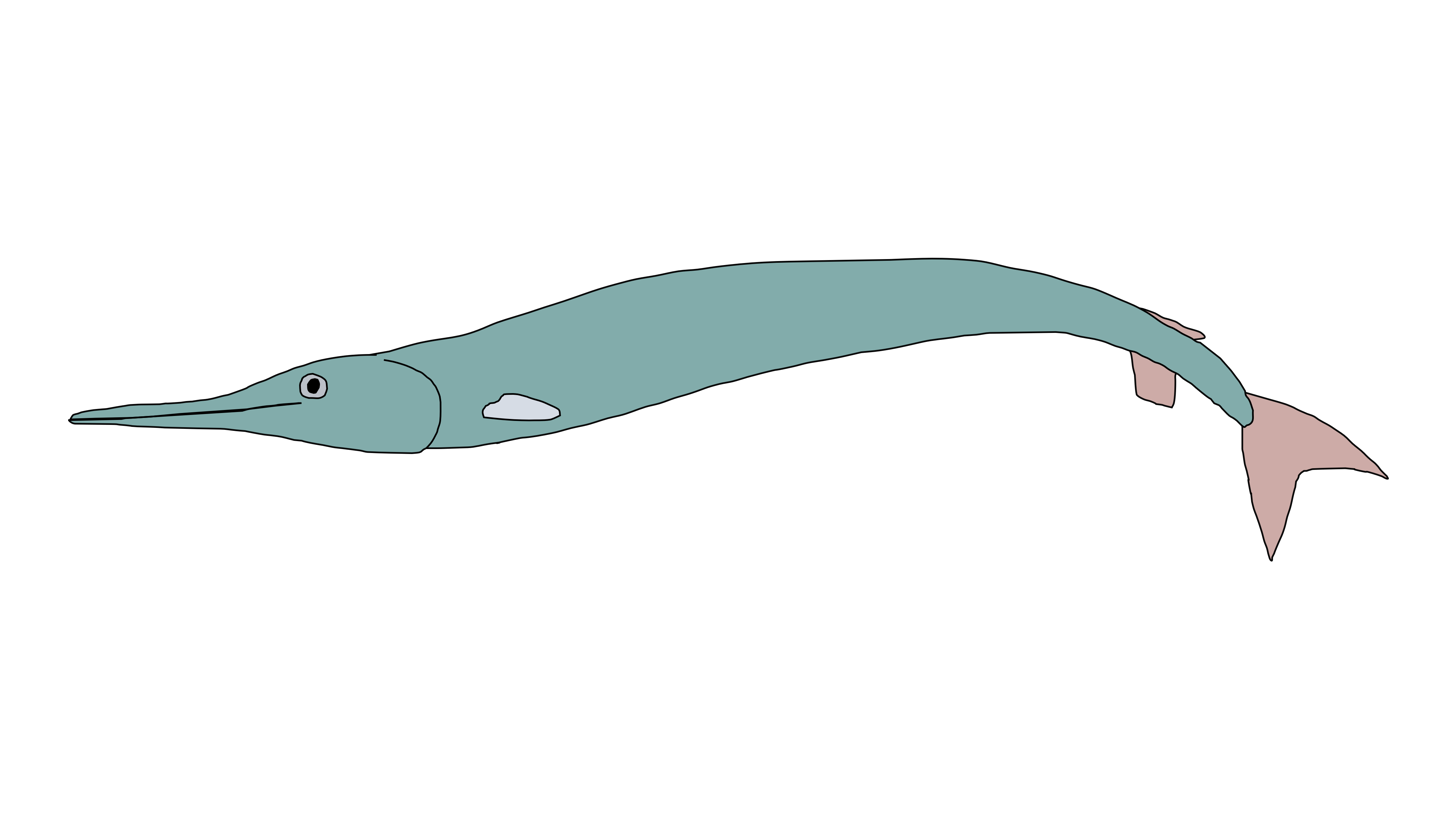
Life restoration

Saurorhynchus is an extinct genus of carnivorous bony fish that lived during the Early and Middle Jurassic epochs. Fossils have been found in Europe (France, Belgium, Luxembourg, United Kingdom, Germany, Italy) and North America (Canada). It is commonly found in pelagic and lagoonal deposits, but mostly marine. Largest specimens can grow up to 50 centimetres (1.6 ft).

Four Jurassic species are recognized. In addition, the Late Triassic species Saurichthys striolatus, Saurichthys calcaratus, and Saurichthys deperditus are sometimes referred to Saurorhynchus, although Saurorhynchus is then treated as a subgenus of Saurichthys.

Saurorhynchus is the youngest representative of the family Saurichthyidae and the order Saurichthyiformes. This family is known for its large, elongate jaws, similar to modern Belonidae. Saurichthyidae also includes the Permian genus Eosaurichthys and the Triassic genus Saurichthys.

== See also ==
- Prehistoric fish
- List of prehistoric bony fish
