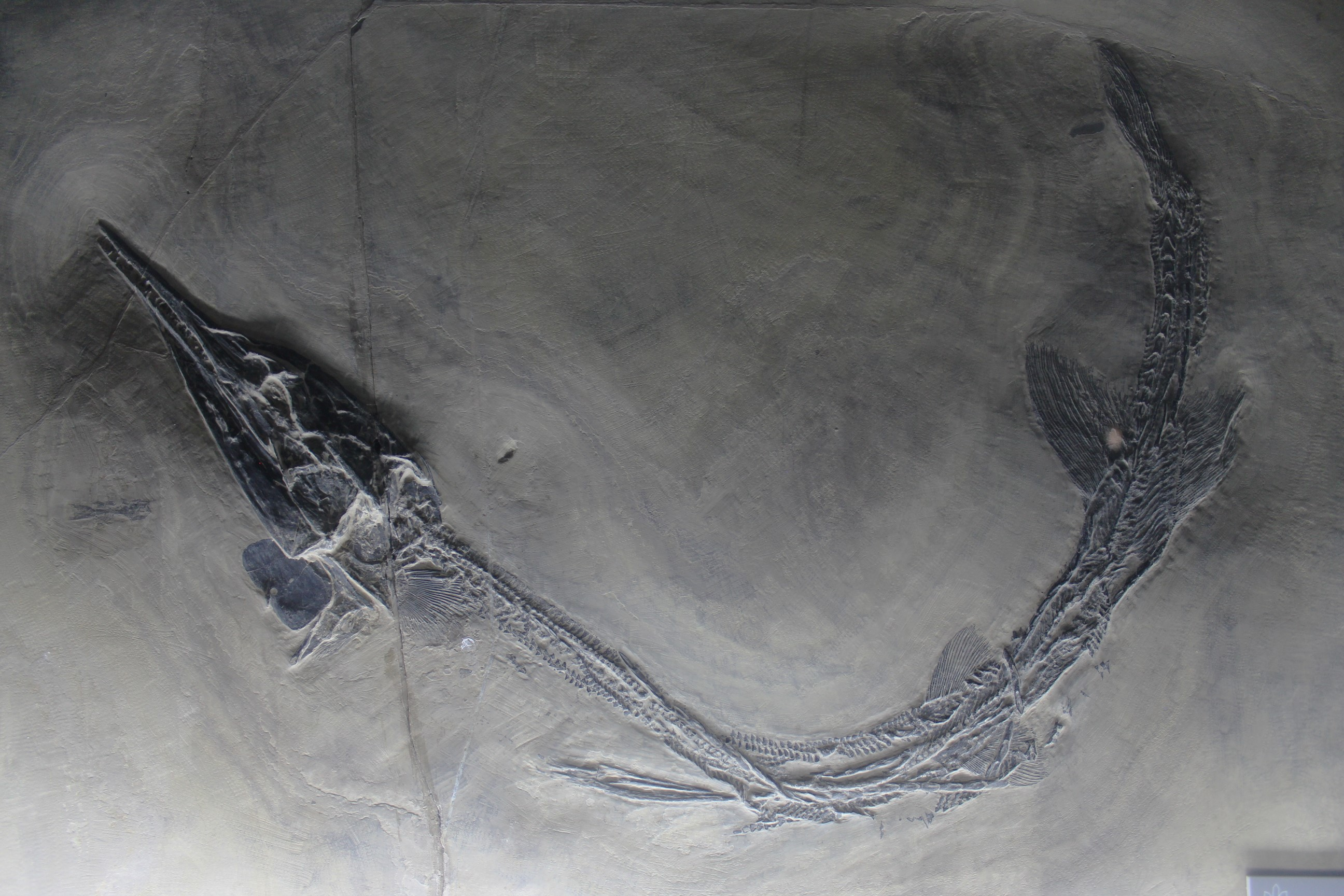
- Fossil specimen, Geological Museum of China

Scientific classification
- Kingdom: Animalia
- Phylum: Chordata
- Class: Actinopterygii
- Order: †Saurichthyiformes
- Family: †Saurichthyidae
- Genus: †Saurichthys; Agassiz, 1834

Type species
- †Saurichthys apicalis Agassiz, 1834

Species
- Over 50 species (see list below)

Synonyms
- Belonorhynchus Bronn 1858; Brevisaurichthys Beltan 1972; Giffonus Costa 1862; Gymnosaurichthys Berg 1940; Ichthyorhynchus Bellotti 1857; Stylorhynchus Martin 1873 non-Lesson1847 non-Stein 1848; Systolichthys Beltan 1972

= Saurichthys =

Saurichthys Temporal range: Triassic ~251.9–201.3 Ma

Extinct genus of fishes

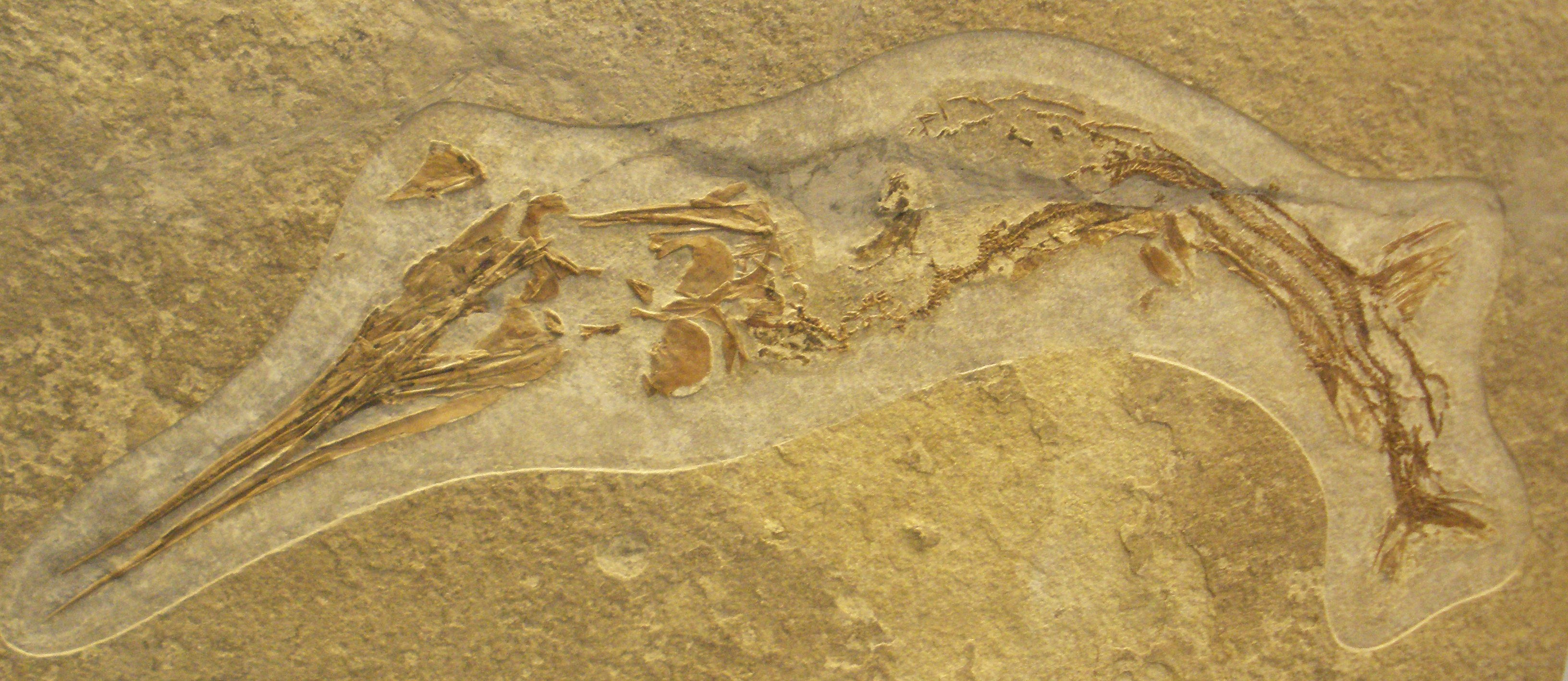
Saurichthys curionii fossil from the Middle Triassic of Monte San Giorgio, Switzerland

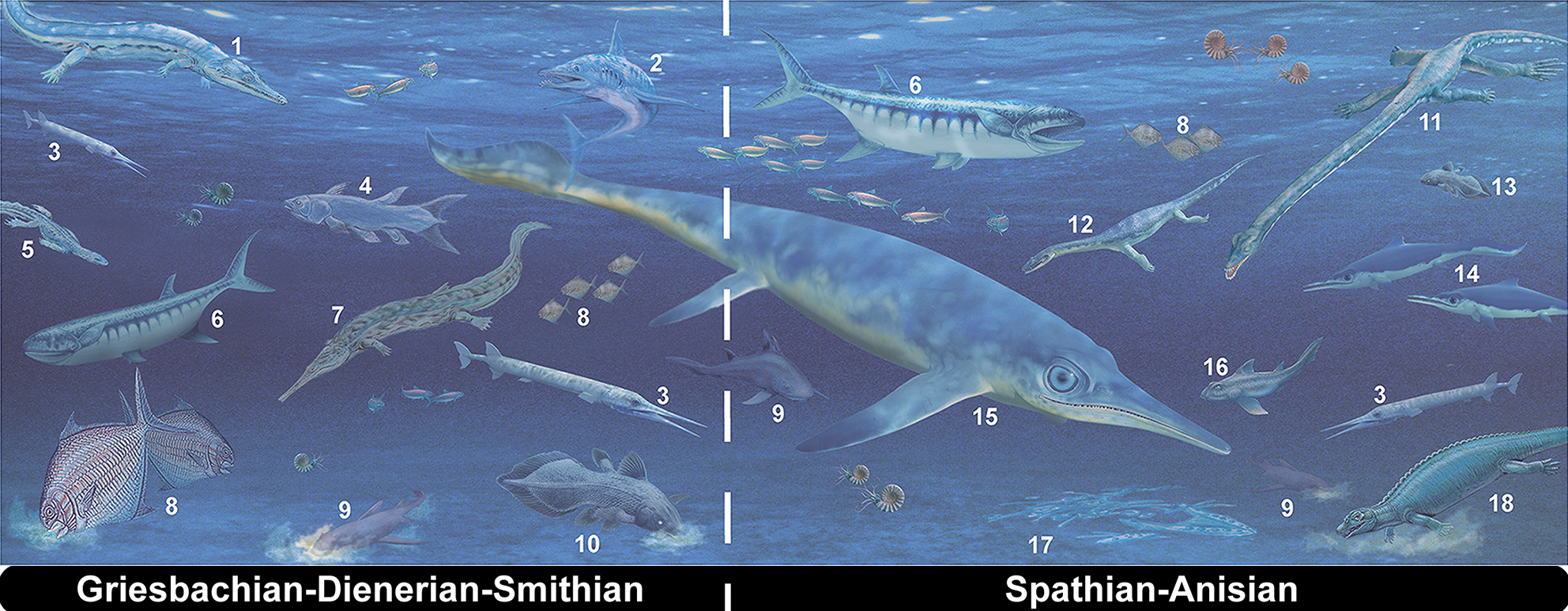
Early Triassic and Middle Triassic marine predators: 3. Saurichthys

Saurichthys (from Greek: σαῦρος saûros, 'lizard' and Greek: ἰχθῦς ikhthûs 'fish') is an extinct genus of predatory ray-finned fish from the Triassic Period. It is the type genus of the family Saurichthyidae (Changhsingian-Middle Jurassic), and the most speciose and longest lasting genus in the family. This family also includes the Permian Eosaurichthys (China) and the Jurassic Saurorhynchus (= Acidorhynchus) from Europe and North America, though it may be more appropriate to treat these as subgenera of Saurichthys, due to the genus Saurichthys otherwise being paraphyletic.

Fossils of Saurichthys have been found on all continents except South America and Antarctica. It inhabited both marine and freshwater environments. The oldest fossils of Saurichthys were recovered from the Wordie Creek Formation in East Greenland and are Griesbachian (Induan, Early Triassic) in age.

Over 50 species of Saurichthys have been described (see list below). The species differ in size and show variability in their skeletal features. The latter can potentially be ascribed to changes in major developmental genes. The use of subgenera (Eosaurichthys, Costasaurichthys, Lepidosaurichthys, Saurorhynchus, Sinosaurichthys) in the literature reflects differences in morphology between species groups. Several species that were described predominantly in the 19th century are based on fragmentary fossils (often isolated teeth). These are mostly considered invalid species by modern taxonomic standards.

Louis Agassiz, who described the type species of Saurichthys in 1834, named it the "lizard fish" because of skeletal features that he thought were intermediate to reptiles and fishes.

Their exact phylogenetic position is uncertain, though it is agreed that they are not members of Neopterygii. Historically, they have been seen as close relatives of the Acipenseriformes (which includes living sturgeon and paddlefish) as part of the Chondrostei, though this has been strongly questioned by modern studies, which suggests that it may lie outside the Actinopterygii crown group.

== Appearance ==
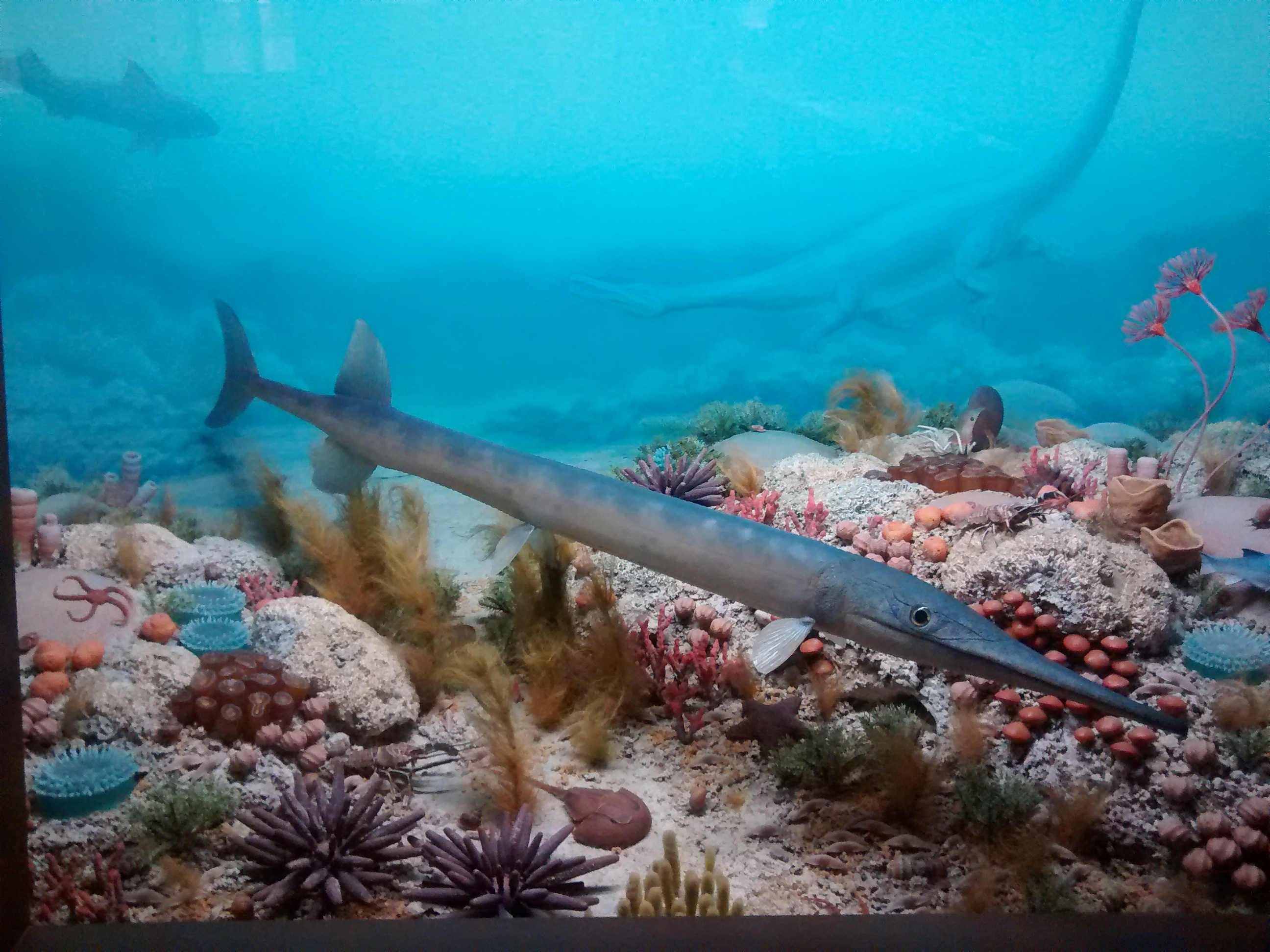
Saurichthys model at the Museum of Man and Nature, Munich

Saurichthys was an elongate, streamlined fish, commonly about 0.6 metres (2.0 ft) to 1 metre (3.3 ft) long. Some species were only a few decimetres long (e.g. Saurichthys minimahleri), while others could grow up to about 1.5 metres (4.9 ft) in length (specimen from the Middle Triassic of Turkey).

Species of Saurichthys had an elongate bodyform superficially similar to the modern garfish or needlefish. Its dorsal and anal fins were placed opposite each other well back on the body, and the tail was symmetrical (abbreviate diphycercal). These features would have made it a powerful swimmer. Its jaws were extremely long, making up a third of the total body length, and ended in a sharp, beak-like tip. Two to six longitudinal scale rows are developed, with small scales in between in some species.

The axial skeleton consists of ossified neural and haemal arches. Haemal arches may develop spines. The neural arches often show spines as well as other projections interpreted as prezygapophyses and postzygapophyses. Ossified centra are missing. The axial skeleton shows regionalization, meaning that there are differences in bone morphology between segments of the axial skeleton. Some species show dedifferentiation of the axial skeleton.

== Ecology and Evolution ==
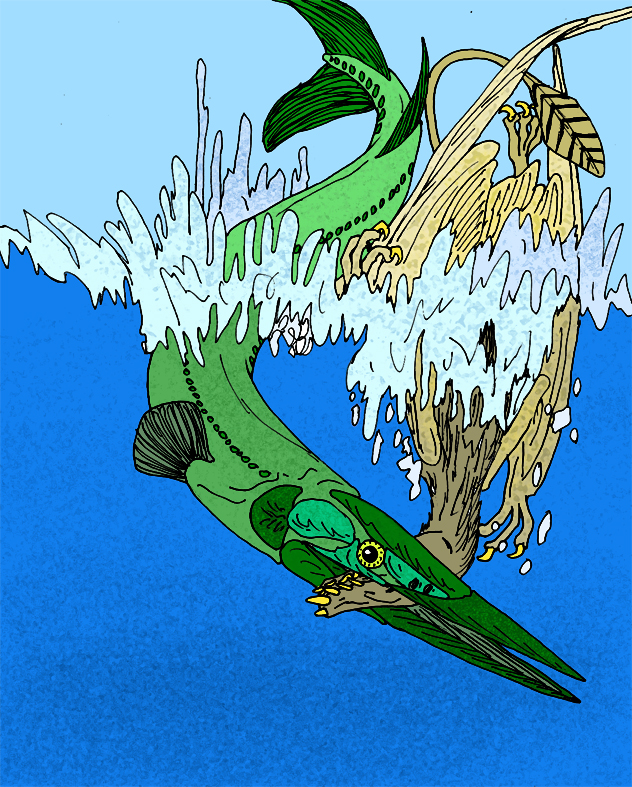
Saurichthys seefeldensis attacking Preondactylus, based on an outdated interpretation of a gastric pellet now believed to contain remains of Langobardisaurus

Large species of Saurichthys were apex predators among Triassic ray-finned fish, together with the marine Birgeria (Birgeriidae).

Saurichthys is classically interpreted as an ambush predator, similar modern gars and needlefish. It is suggested that it first approached its prey and then suddenly accelerated towards it. Some species may have lived as subsurface cruisers (Sinosaurichthys).

Specimens showing half-swallowed conspecific individuals suggest that cannibalism was relatively common in Saurichthys. Fossil evidence, in the form of a bolus (ball-shaped mass) of bones in the same strata, indicates that Saurichthys attacked marine reptiles such as the tanystropheid Langobardisaurus, or possibly scavenged their corpses.

A study on the gastrointestinal tract of Saurichthys found similarities with present-day sharks and rays, in particular the many windings in the spiral valve. The many windings increased the surface area for digestion, which is sure to have provided the fish with more energy. It indicates that Saurichthys had an energy-laden lifestyle.

Early Triassic species of Saurichthys differ from later species most prominently in their more elongate postorbital portion of the skull (part of the skull behind the eyes) and their generally denser scale cover. Middle Triassic and Late Triassic species, on the other hand, typically have a short postorbital portion of the skull and their scale cover is reduced. This reduction includes both the number of the longitudinal scale rows and the size of individual scales. These evolutionary trends are, however, not an indication for anagenesis, but rather the result of parallel evolution in different lineages of Saurichthys. The aforementioned trends are observed only in marine species. Late Triassic freshwater species of Saurichthys (e.g., S. orientalis, S. sui) retain an elongate postorbital skull portion and a denser scale cover, suggesting that freshwater environments served as refugia for species with a more primitive appearance.

== Reproduction ==
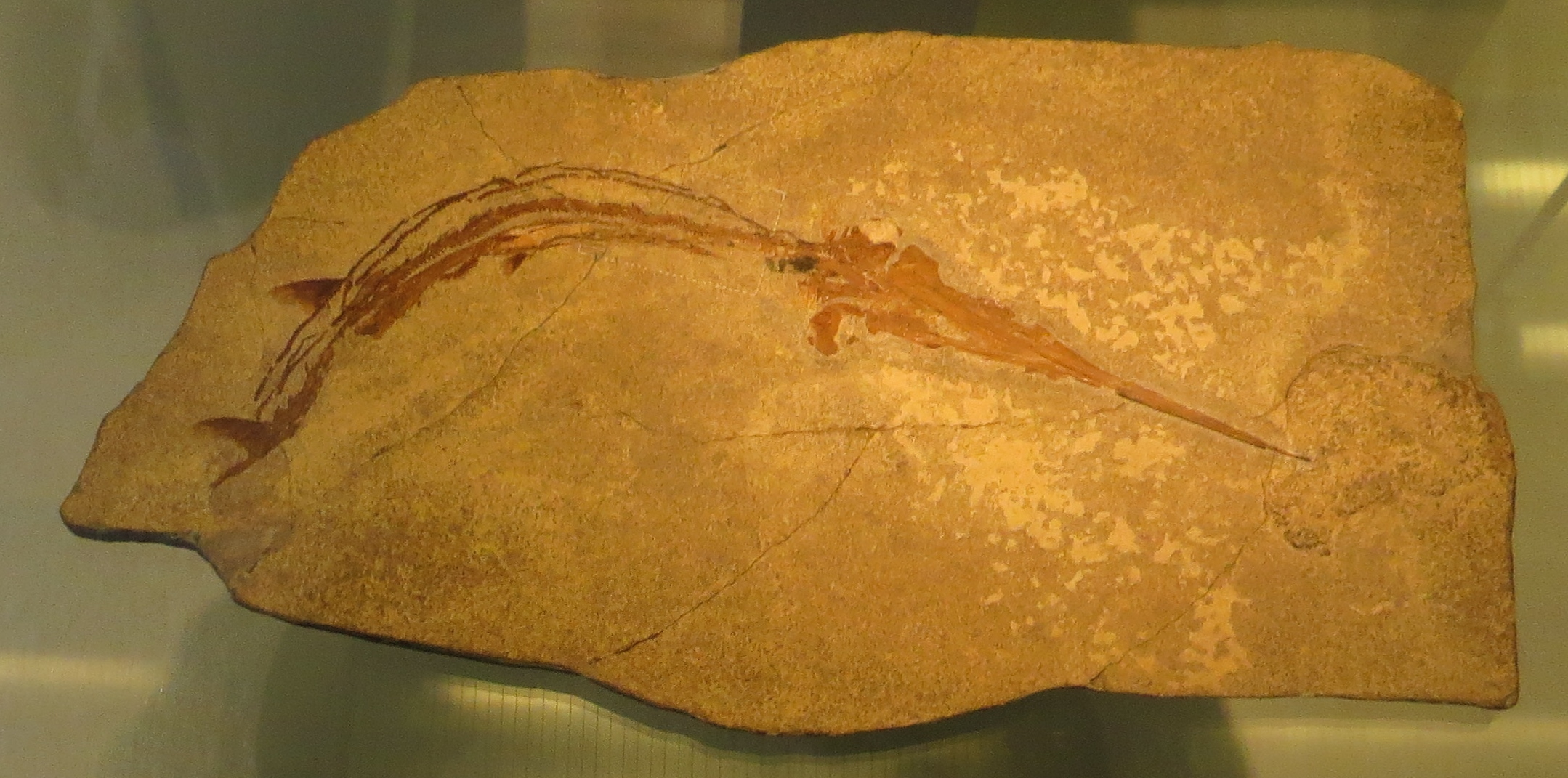
Saurichthys curionii with embryos at Natural History Museum of the University of Zurich

Fossils of gravid females provide evidence for (ovo-)viviparity in Saurichthys and the oldest known example for viviparity in ray-finned fishes.

Internal fertilisation is also evidenced by specialized pelvic fin rays (Saurichthys calcaratus) or ventral scales (gonopodium; Saurichthys curionii, Saurichthys macrocephalus) that are interpreted as copulatory organs of males.

== Species ==
This list includes species of Saurichthys that are generally considered valid (based on Romano et al. and references cited below). The validity of species that are based on fragmentary material (e.g., isolated scales or teeth) is questionable (see below).

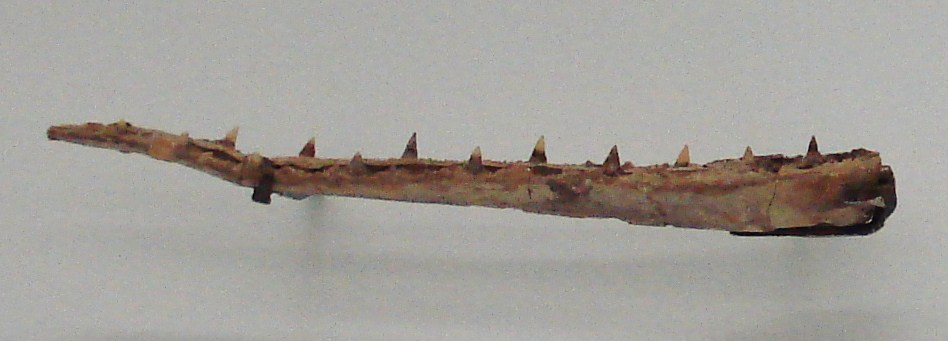
Lower jaw of Saurichthys apicalis

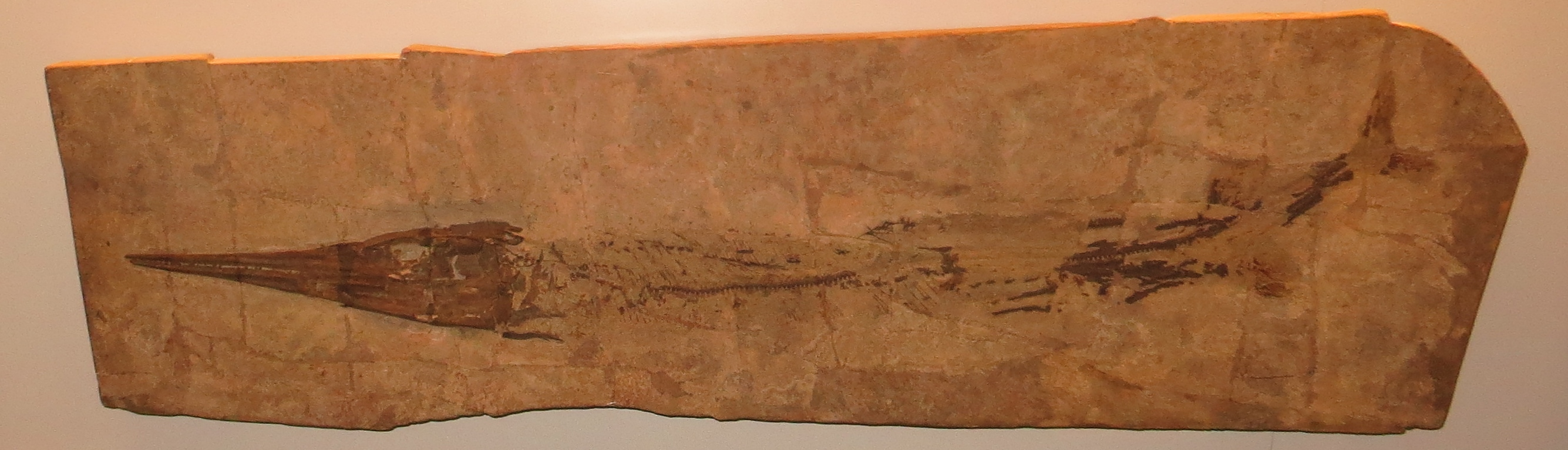
Saurichthys costasquamosus fossil

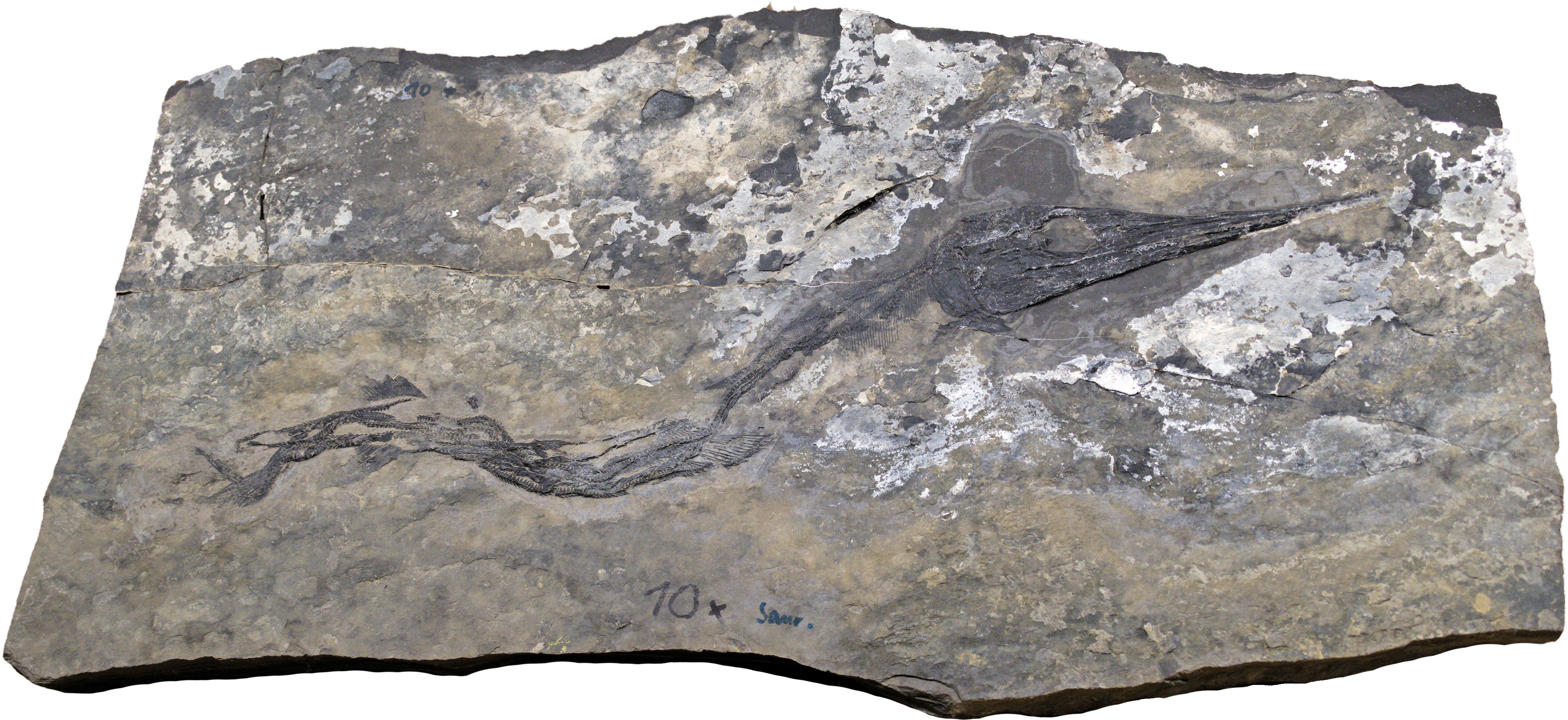
Saurichthys macrocephalus fossil

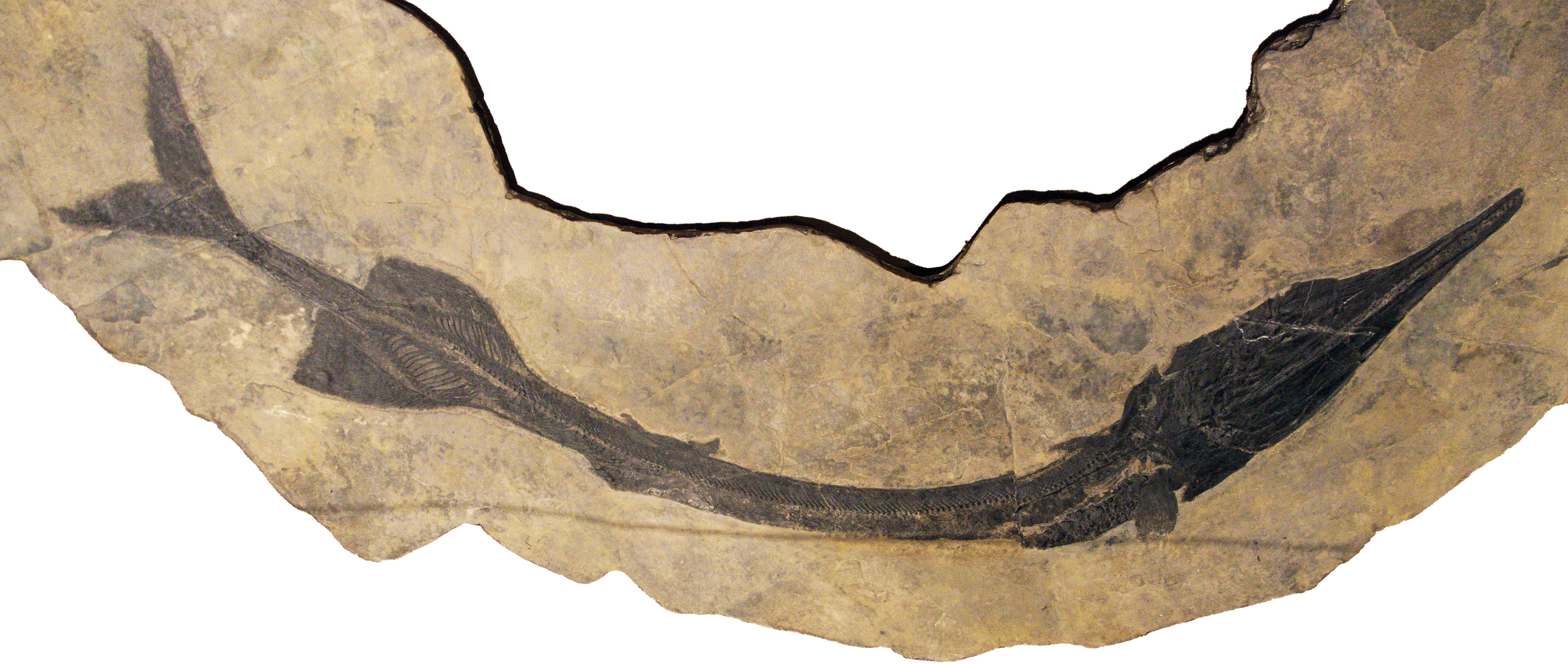
Fossil of Saurichthys sp.

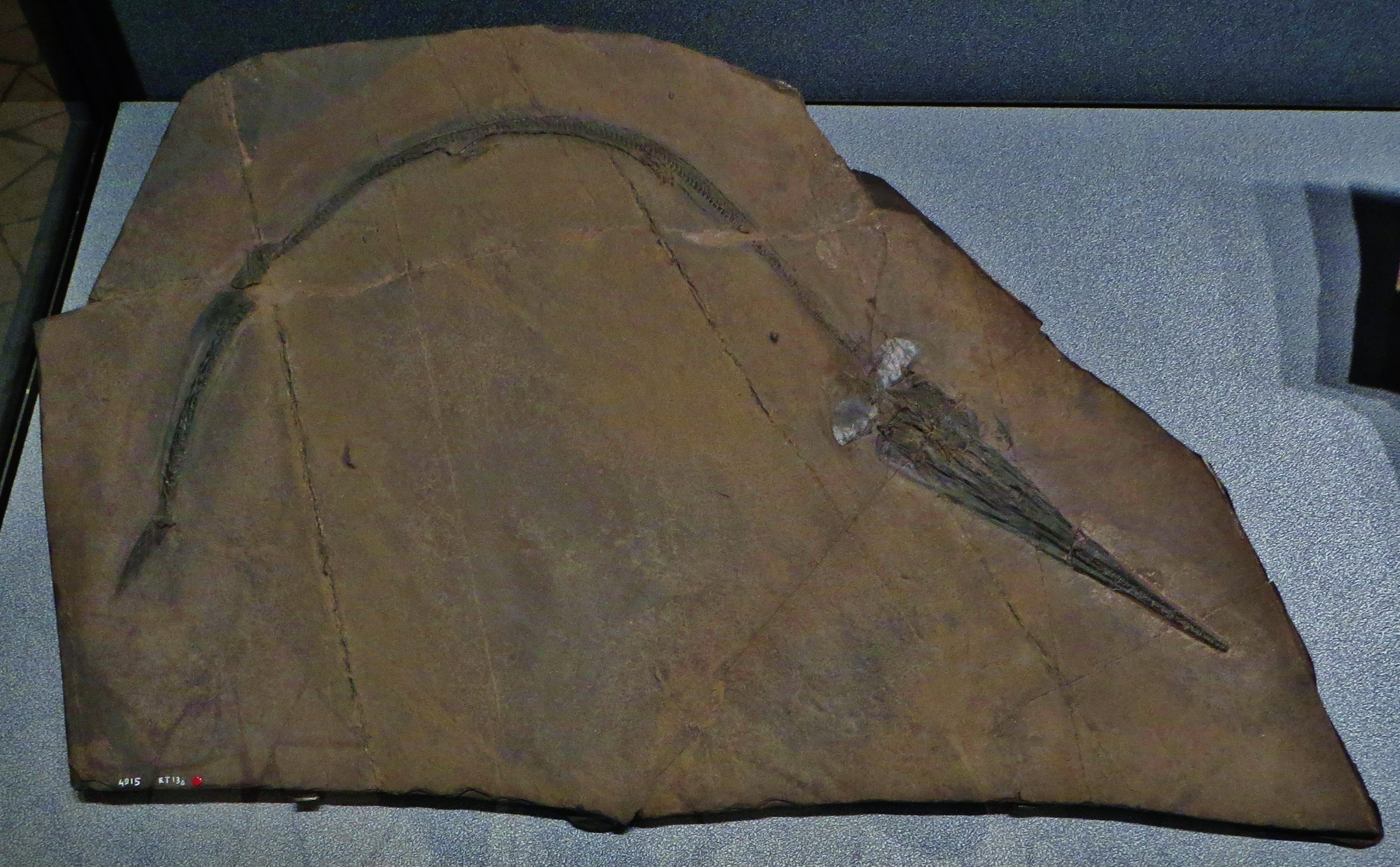
Fossil of Saurichthys sp.

- †Saurichthys (Costasaurichthys Tintori 2013)
  - †Saurichthys (Costasaurichthys) costasquamosus Rieppel 1985
  - †Saurichthys (Costasaurichthys) paucitrichus Rieppel 1992
- †Saurichthys (Eosaurichthys Liu and Wei 1988)
  - †Saurichthys (Eosaurichthys) chaoi (Liu and Wei 1988)
  - †Saurichthys (Eosaurichthys) madagascariensis Piveteau 1945
- †Saurichthys (Lepidosaurichthys Tintori 2013)
  - †Saurichthys (Lepidosaurichthys) dayi (Raymond 1925)
  - †Saurichthys (Lepidosaurichthys) elongatus Stensiö 1925
  - †Saurichthys (Lepidosaurichthys) ornatus Stensiö 1925
  - †Saurichthys (Lepidosaurichthys) toxolepis Mutter et al. 2008
  - †Saurichthys (Lepidosaurichthys) wimani (Woodward 1912)
- †Saurichthys (Saurorhynchus Agassiz 1844)
  - †Saurichthys (Saurorhynchus) calcaratus Griffith 1977
  - †Saurichthys (Saurorhynchus) deperditus (Costa 1862)
  - †Saurichthys (Saurorhynchus) striolatus Bronn 1858
  - †Saurorhynchus acutus (Agassiz 1844)
  - †Saurorhynchus anningae Maxwell & Stumpf 2017
  - †Saurorhynchus brevirostris (Woodward 1895)
  - †Saurorhynchus hauffi Maxwell & Stumpf 2017
- †Saurichthys (Sinosaurichthys Wu et al. 2011)
  - †Saurichthys (Sinosaurichthys) longipectoralis Wu et al. 2011
  - †Saurichthys (Sinosaurichthys) longimedialis Wu et al. 2011
  - †Saurichthys (Sinosaurichthys) minuta Wu et al. 2011
- †Saurichthys apicalis Agassiz 1834 (type species)
- †Saurichthys breviabdominalis Maxwell et al. 2015
- †Saurichthys curionii (Bellotti 1857)
- †Saurichthys daubreei Firtion 1934
- †Saurichthys dawaziensis Wu et al. 2009
- †Saurichthys dianneae Maxwell et al. 2016
- †Saurichthys dongusensis Minich 1992
- †Saurichthys eximius Minikh 1982
- †Saurichthys gigas (Woodward 1890), non-von Quenstedt 1858
- †Saurichthys gracilis (Woodward 1890)
- †Saurichthys grignae Tintori 2013
- †Saurichthys gypsophilus Reis 1892
- †Saurichthys hamiltoni Stensiö 1925
- †Saurichthys hoffmanni Werneburg et al. 2014
- †Saurichthys huanshenensis Chou & Liu 1957
- †Saurichthys irregularis Oertle 1928
- †Saurichthys justitias Stack 2025
- †Saurichthys latifrons Eck 1865
- †Saurichthys lepidosteoides Frech 1903
- †Saurichthys macrocephalus (Deecke 1889)
- †Saurichthys majiashanensis Tintori et al. 2014
- †Saurichthys minimahleri Werneburg et al. 2014
- †Saurichthys nepalensis Beltan & Janvier 1978
- †Saurichthys obrutchevi Minich 1981
- †Saurichthys orientalis Sytchevskaya 1999
- †Saurichthys parvidens Wade 1935
- †Saurichthys piveteaui Beltan 1968
- †Saurichthys proximus Minich 1981
- †Saurichthys rieppeli Maxwell et al. 2015
- †Saurichthys sceltrichensis Renesto et al. 2021
- †Saurichthys seefeldensis Kner 1867
- †Saurichthys spinosa Wu et al. 2018
- †Saurichthys stensioi Lehman 1952
- †Saurichthys sui Fang & Wu 2022
- †Saurichthys taotie Fang et al. 2023
- †Saurichthys tenuirostris Münster 1839
- †Saurichthys tertius Minich 1982
- †Saurichthys ultimus Minikh 1992
- †Saurichthys vjuschkovi Minikh 1983
- †Saurichthys yangjuanensis Wu et al. 2015
- †Saurichthys yunnanensis Zhang, Zhou, Lu & Bai 2010

=== Species based on fragmentary fossils ===
- †Saurichthys aculeatus Henry 1876
- †Saurichthys annulatus Winkler 1880
- †Saurichthys catalaunicus (Betlan 1972)
- †Saurichthys indicus de Koninck 1863
- †Saurichthys listroconus Plieninger 1844
- †Saurichthys longiconus Agassiz 1834
- †Saurichthys longidens Agassiz 1844
- †Saurichthys osseus (Betlan 1972)
- †Saurichthys semicostatus Münster 1839
- †Saurichthys striatulus Henry 1876
- †Saurichthys subulatus Henry 1876

== Synonyms ==
- †Saurichthys acuminatus Agassiz 1844 → †Birgeria acuminata
- †Saurichthys acutus Agassiz 1844 → †Saurorhynchus acutus
- †Saurichthys brevirostris (Woodward 1895) → †Saurorhynchus brevirostris
- †Saurichthys costatus Münster 1839 → †Birgeria? costata
- †Saurichthys elegans Stensiö 1925 → †Saurichthys elongatus
- †Saurichthys intermedius (Bassani 1886) → †Saurichthys curionii
- †Saurichthys krambergeri Schlosser 1918 → †Saurichthys deperditus
- †Saurichthys mougeoti Agassiz 1844 → †Birgeria mougeoti
- †Saurichthys robustus Bassani 1886 → †Saurichthys curionii, †Saurichthys macrocephalus, †Saurichthys costasquamosus
- †Saurichthys stoppanii (Bassani 1886) → †Saurichthys curionii

== See also ==
- Prehistoric fish
- List of prehistoric bony fish
