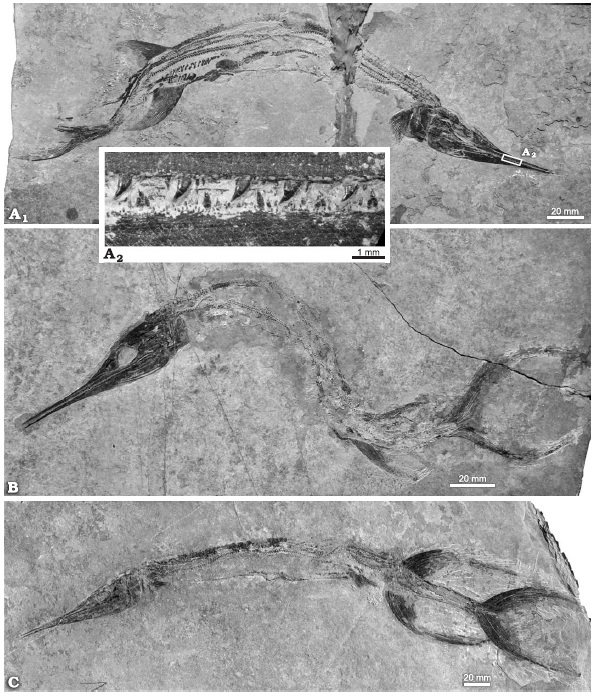
- Sinosaurichthys longimedialis fossil

Scientific classification
- Kingdom: Animalia
- Phylum: Chordata
- Class: Actinopterygii
- Order: †Saurichthyiformes
- Family: †Saurichthyidae
- Genus: †Sinosaurichthys; Wu et al., 2010

Species
- †S. longipectoralis Wu et al., 2010 (type); †S. longimedialis Wu et al., 2010; †S. minuta Wu et al., 2010

= Sinosaurichthys =

Sinosaurichthys Temporal range: Anisian

Extinct genus of fishes

Sinosaurichthys is an extinct genus of saurichthyid ray-finned fish, which existed in south-western China during the Middle Triassic (Anisian age). Fossils have been found in the Upper Member of the Guanling Formation of two localities: Yangjuan of Panxian County, Guizhou Province, and Dawazi of Luoping, Yunnan Province, China.

It was first named by Wu Feixiang, Sun Yuanlin, Xu Guanghui, Hao Weicheng, Jiang Dayong and Sun Zuoyu in 2010. The type species is Sinosaurichthys longipectoralis. There are two additional species, S. longimedialis and S. minuta. The species Saurichthys spinosa from the Middle Triassic of China may be closely related with Sinosaurichthys.

Sinosaurichthys is often treated as a subgenus of Saurichthys, rather than a genus.
