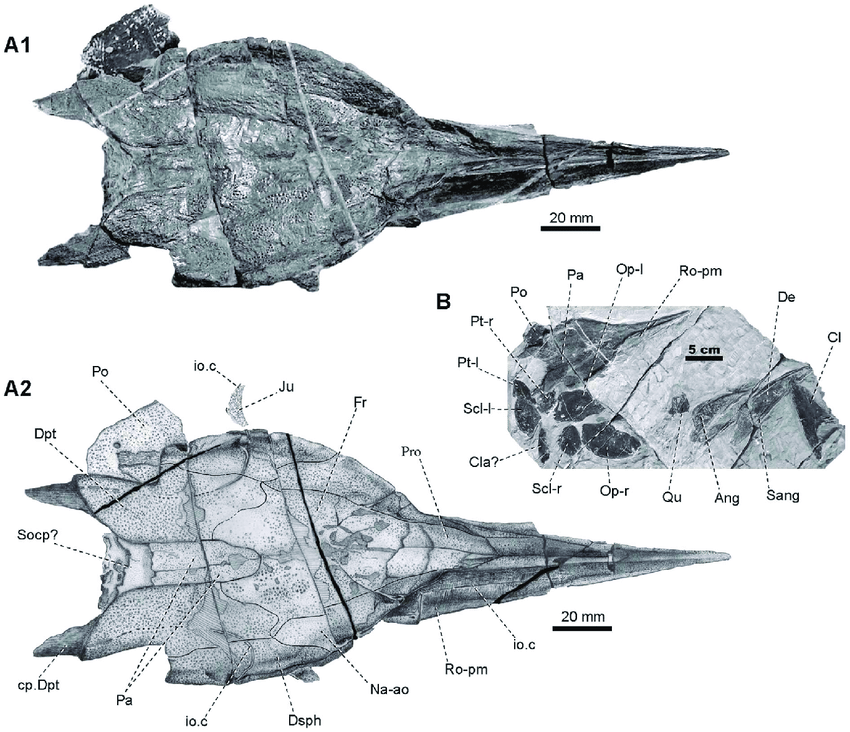
- Skull of Yelangichthys

Scientific classification
- Kingdom: Animalia
- Phylum: Chordata
- Class: Actinopterygii
- Order: †Saurichthyiformes
- Family: †Yelangichthyidae; Wu, Chang, Sun & Xu, 2013
- Genus: †Yelangichthys; Wu, Chang, Sun & Xu, 2013

Species
- Y. macrocephalus

= Yelangichthys =

Yelangichthys Temporal range: Anisian ~247.2–242 Ma

Extinct genus of fishes

Yelangichthys is an extinct genus of prehistoric bony fish that lived during the Anisian age of the Middle Triassic epoch in what is now Guizhou, China. The type and only species, Y. macrocephalus, is known from two specimens, both of which were recovered from the Upper Member of the Guanling Formation.

== Ecology & evolution ==
Phylogenetic analysis places Yelangichthys as a basal member of the Saurichthyiformes. It is distinguished from other saurichthyiforms most notably by its broad skull and crushing dentition. Similarities with other saurichthyiforms include the lengthened rostrum. It is referred to its own monotypyic family, Yelangichthyidae.

== See also ==
- Prehistoric fish
- List of prehistoric bony fish
