= Eosaurichthys =

Eosaurichthys Temporal range: Changhsingian to Olenekian

Scientific classification
- Domain: Eukaryota
- Kingdom: Animalia
- Phylum: Chordata
- Class: Actinopterygii
- Order: †Saurichthyiformes
- Family: †Saurichthyidae
- Genus: †Eosaurichthys; Liu & Wei, 1988

Type species
- Eosaurichthys chaoi Liu & Wei, 1988

Species
- †E. chaoi Liu & Wei, 1988; †E. madagascariensis (Piveteau, 1945)

Extinct genus of fishes

Eosaurichthys ("dawn Saurichthys") is an extinct genus, or potentially subgenus, of marine saurichthyid ray-finned fish that lived during the late Permian epoch (Changhsingian age) to potentially the Early Triassic epoch (Olenekian). It is one of the earliest saurichthyid genera known from the fossil record. If E. madagascariensis is a member of this genus, then it appears to have survived the Permian-Triassic extinction event.

Eosaurichthys is often treated as a subgenus of Saurichthys rather than a genus, with its type species referred to as Saurichthys (Eosaurichthys) chaoi.

Up to two species are known:

- E. chaoi Liu & Wei, 1988 - Late Permian (Changhsingian) of China (Changxing Formation)
- E. madagascariensis (Piveteau, 1945) - Early Triassic (Olenekian) of Madagascar (Sakamena Formation)

Saurichthyid remains tentatively referred to E. madagascariensis are known from Anisian-aged freshwater beds of the Yerrapalli Formation in India.

== Appearance ==
Eosaurichthys closely resembles its daughter genus, Saurichthys, in both form and morphology. Its body is fully covered by scales, while in Saurichthys the scale cover is reduced.

== See also ==
- Prehistoric fish
- List of prehistoric bony fish
