= Squid as food =

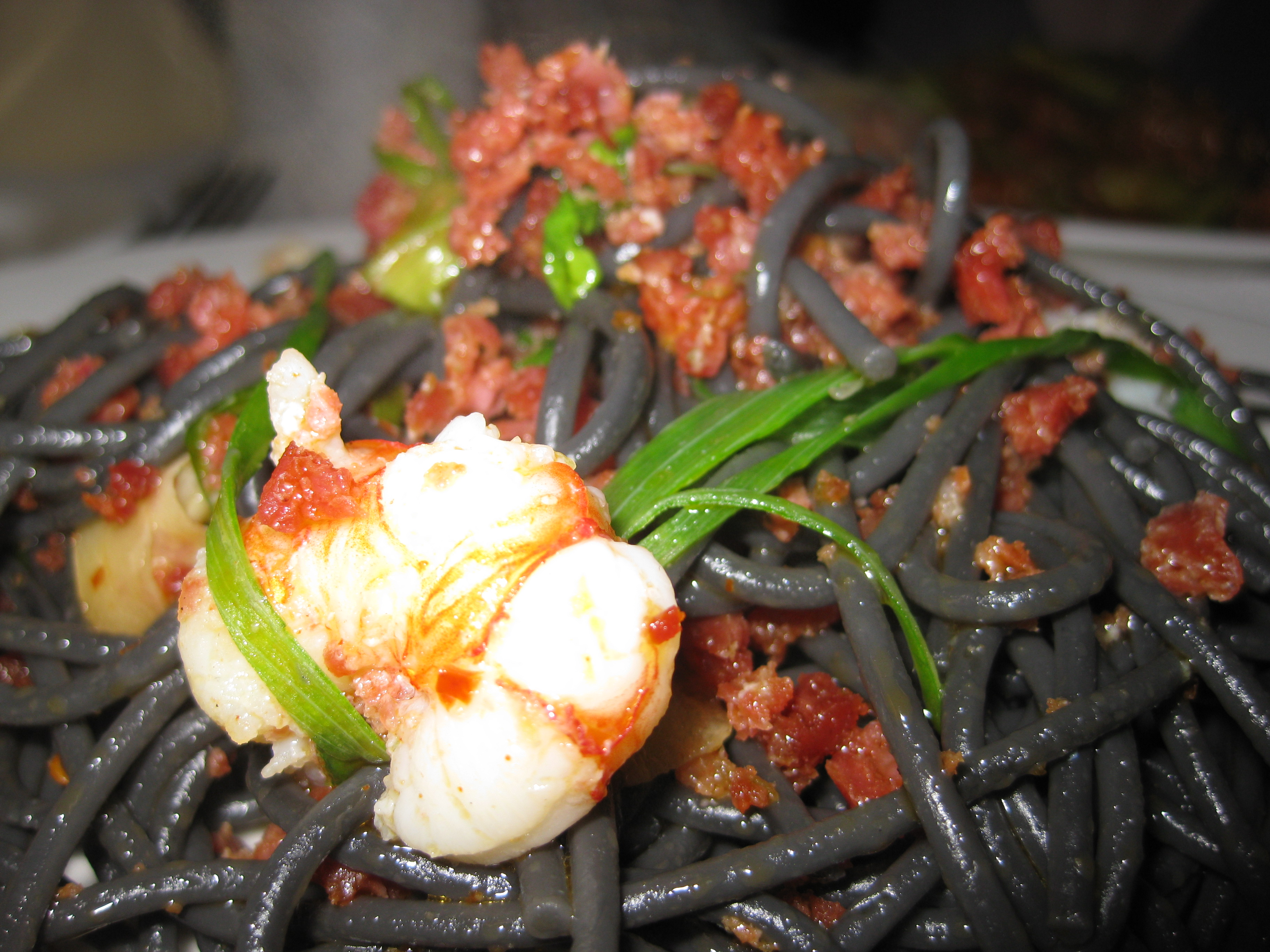
Squid-ink pasta served at a Manhattan restaurant

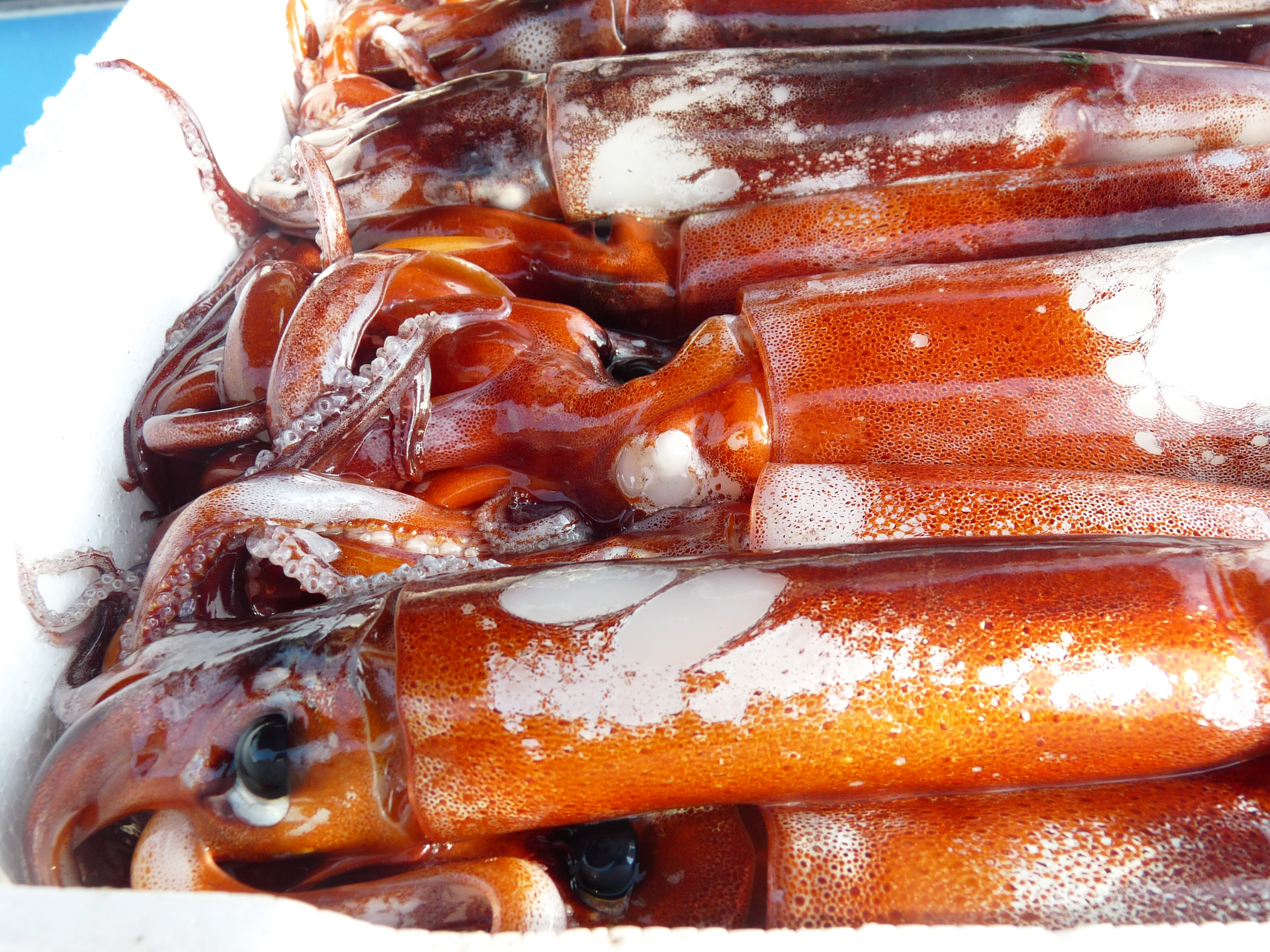
Whole squid sold as food in Lipari, Sicily, Italy

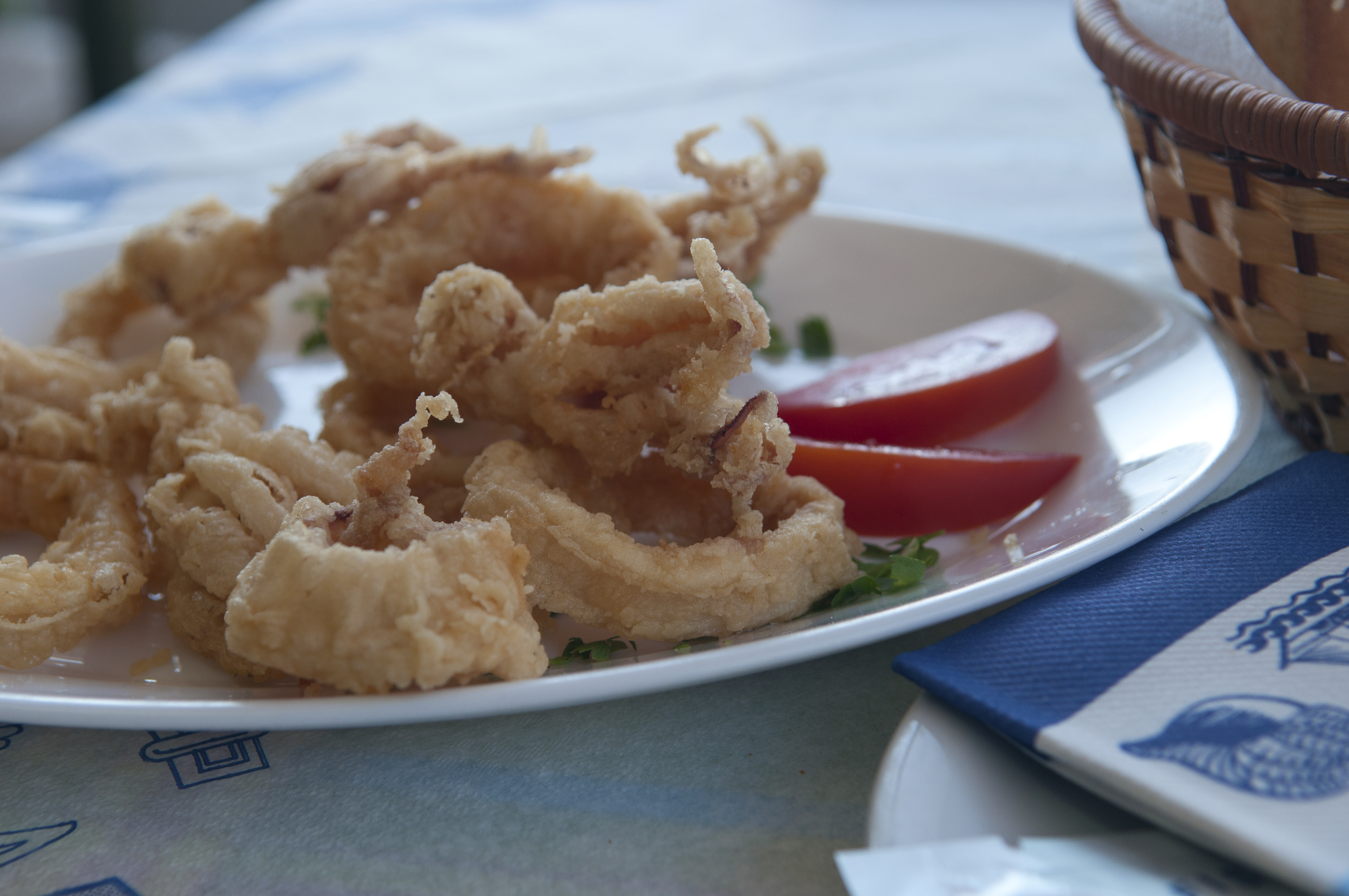
Fried squid in Greek cuisine

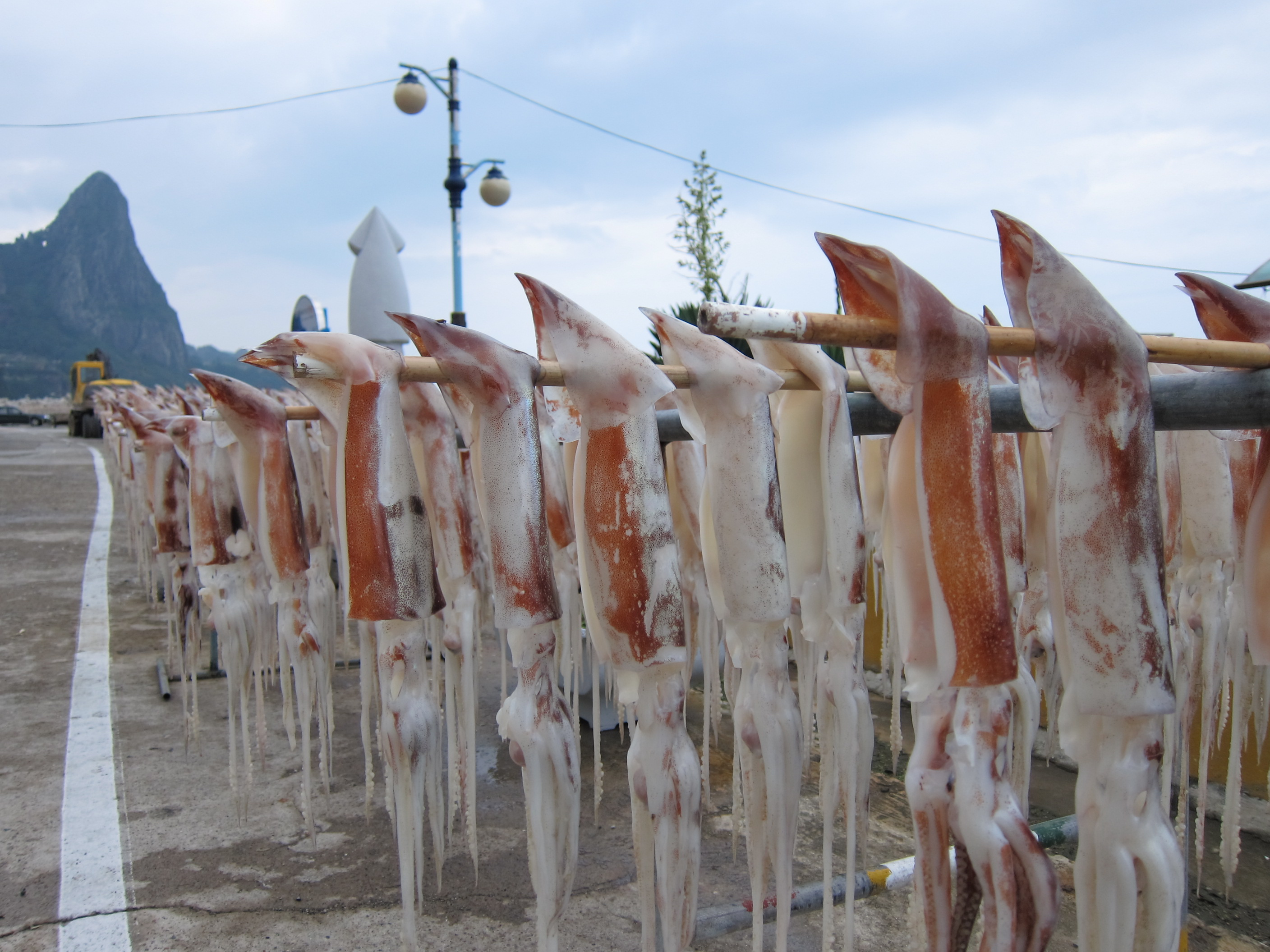
Drying squid in Ulleungdo, South Korea

Squid is eaten in many cuisines; in English, the culinary name calamari is often used for squid dishes. There are many ways to prepare and cook squid. Fried squid is common in the Mediterranean. In Britain, it can be found in Mediterranean "calamari" or Asian "salt and pepper fried squid" forms in various establishments, often served as a bar snack, street food, or starter. In other Anglophone or Commonwealth countries, such as New Zealand, Australia, the United States, Canada, and South Africa, it is sold in fish and chip shops, Italian and other Mediterranean restaurants; seafood restaurants, and steakhouses.

Squid can be prepared for consumption in a number of other ways. In Korea and Japan, it is sometimes served raw, and elsewhere it is used as sushi, sashimi and tempura items, grilled, stuffed, covered in batter, stewed in gravy and served in stir-fries, rice, and noodle dishes. Dried shredded squid is a common snack in some Asian regions, including East Asia.

== Use ==
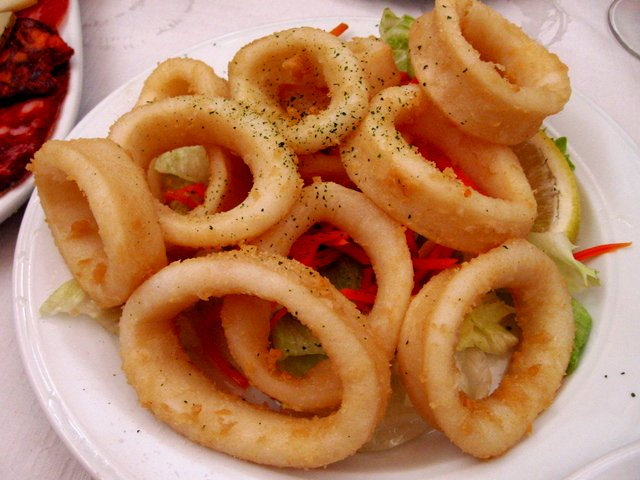
Fried calamares from Spain

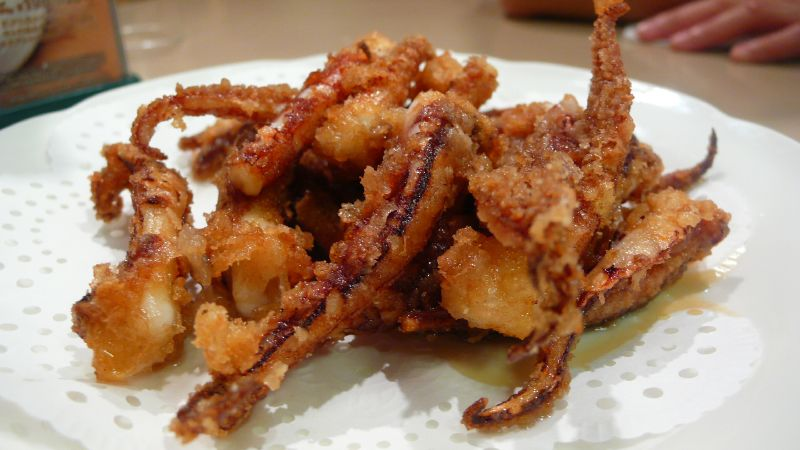
Karaage of squid legs from Japan

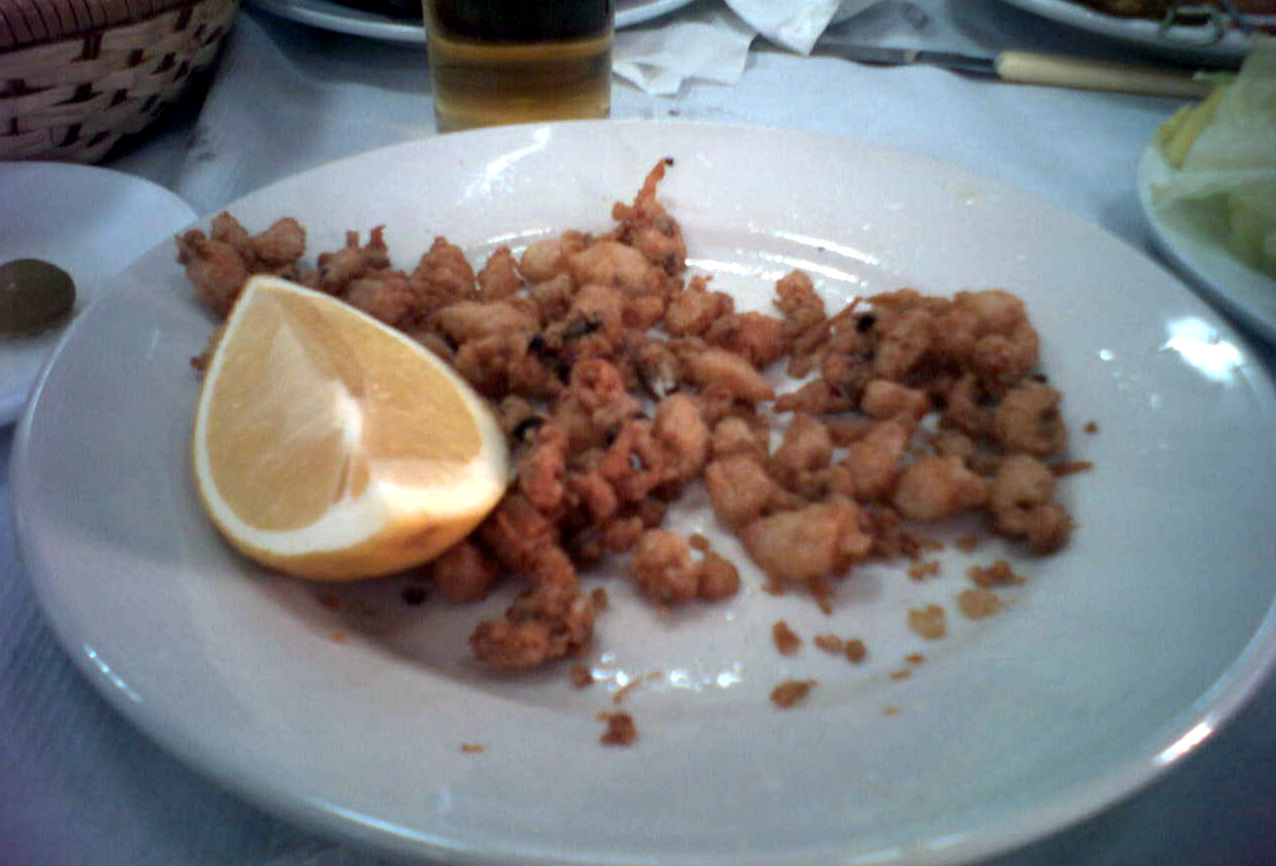
Battered and fried baby squid, known as puntillitas - a popular tapas dish in Andalusia, Spain

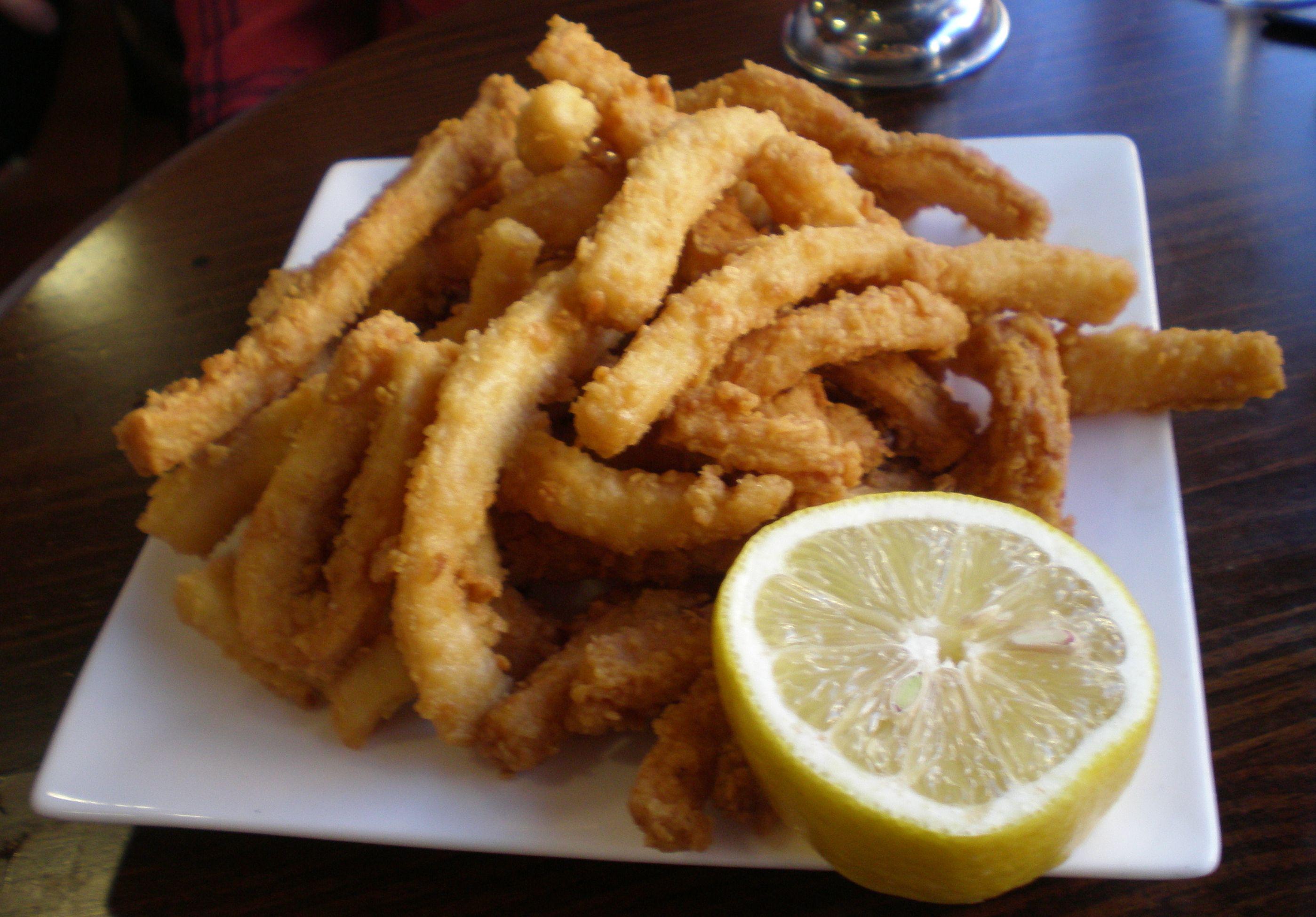
Cantabrian rabas de magano, deep fried squid body strips and tentacles

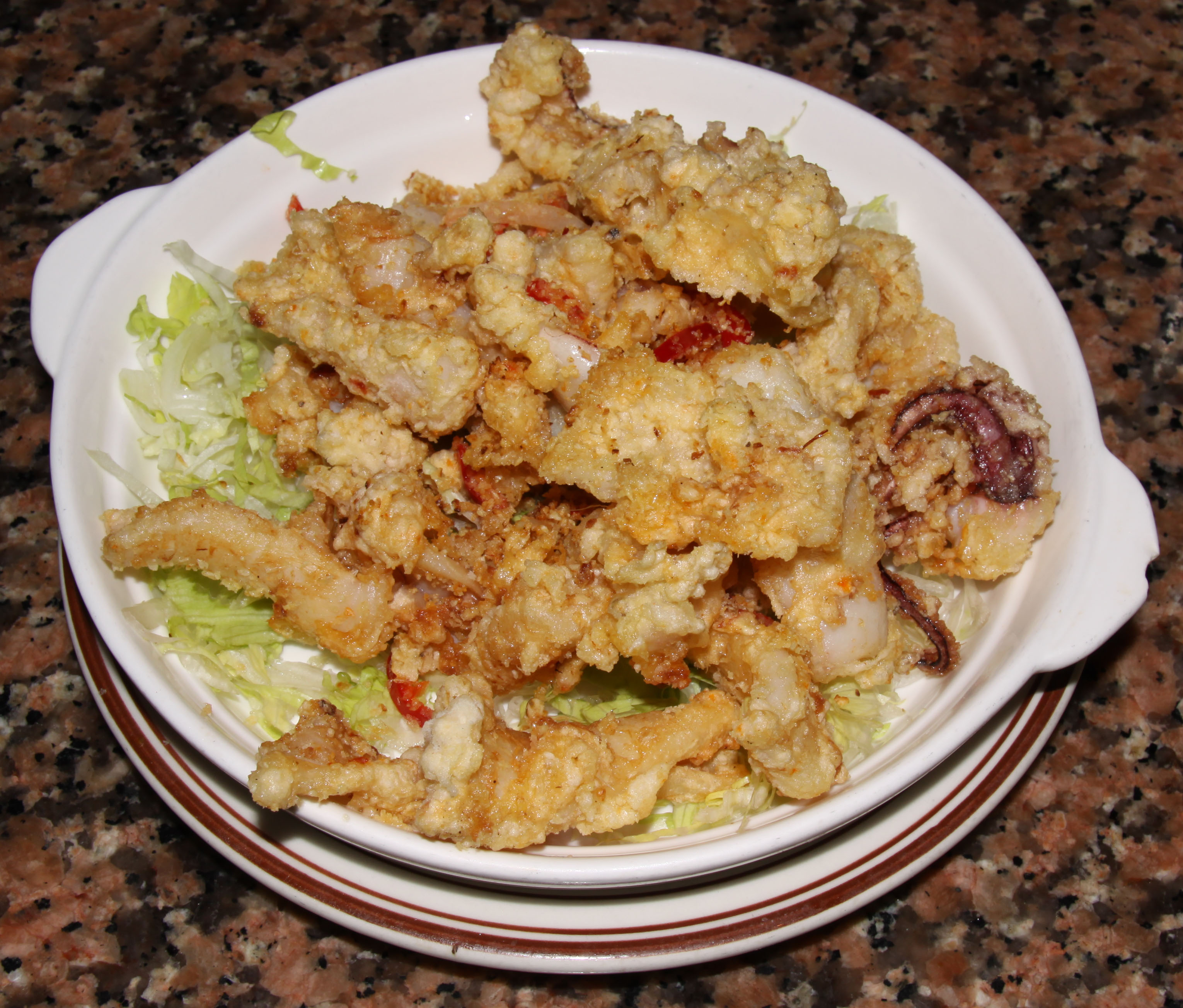
Hong Kong-style fried squid

The body (mantle), arms, tentacles, and ink of squid are all edible; the only parts of the squid that are not eaten are its beak and gladius (pen). The mantle can be stuffed whole, cut into flat pieces or sliced into rings.

=== Asia ===
In Chinese and Southeast Asian cuisine, squid is used in stir-fries, rice, and noodle dishes. It may be heavily spiced.

In China, Thailand, and Japan, squid is typically grilled whole and sold in food stalls.

Pre-packaged dried shredded squid or cuttlefish are snack items in Hong Kong, Taiwan, Korea, Japan, China and Russia, often shredded or rolled to reduce chewiness.

==== Japan ====
In Japan, squid is used in almost every type of dish, including sushi, sashimi, and tempura. It can also be marinated in soy sauce (ika okizuke), stewed (nabemono), and grilled (ikayaki). It is eaten raw as ika sōmen and katsu ika odori-don.

==== Korea ====
In Korea, squid is sometimes killed and served quickly. Unlike octopus, squid tentacles do not usually continue to move when reaching the table. This fresh squid is 산 오징어 (san ojingeo) (also with small octopuses called nakji). The squid is served with Korean mustard, soy sauce, chili sauce, or sesame sauce. It is salted and wrapped in lettuce or perilla leaves. Squid is also marinated in hot pepper sauce and cooked on a pan (nakji bokum or ojingeo bokum/ojingeo-chae-bokkeum). They are also served by food stands as a snack food, battered and deep fried or grilled using hot skillets. They are also cut up into small pieces to be added to 해물파전 (Korean seafood pancake) or a variety of spicy seafood soups. Dried squid may also accompany alcoholic beverages as anju. Dried squid is served with peanuts. Squid is roasted and served with hot pepper paste or mayonnaise as a dip. Steamed squid and boiled squid are delicacies.

Also in Korea, squid is made into jeotgal (salted seafood). The ojingeo-jeot, thin strips of skinned, gutted, washed, salted, and fermented squid seasoned with spicy gochugaru (chili powder)-based spices and minced aromatic vegetables, is a popular banchan (side dish) served in small quantities as an accompaniment to bap (cooked rice). In Japan, a similar dish is called ika-no-shiokara. The heavily salted squid (usually sparkling enope (firefly) squid or spear squid), sometimes with innards, ferments for as long as a month, and is preserved in small jars. This salty, strong flavoured item is served in small quantities as an accompaniment to white rice or alcoholic beverages.

==== Philippines ====
In the Philippines, squid is cooked as adobong pusit, squid in adobo sauce, along with the ink, imparting a tangy flavour, especially with fresh chillies. Battered squid rings, which is also sold as a popular deep-fried street food called calamares in the Philippines, is served with alioli, mayonnaise or chilli vinegar. Squid is grilled on charcoal, brushed with a soy sauce-based marinade, and stuffed with tomato and onions. Another recipe is rellenong pusit, stuffed with finely-chopped vegetables, squid fat, and ground pork. A variant of pancit noodles is pancit pusit, which is pancit bihon with squid added, along with the ink, giving the noodles its dark color.

==== Taiwan ====
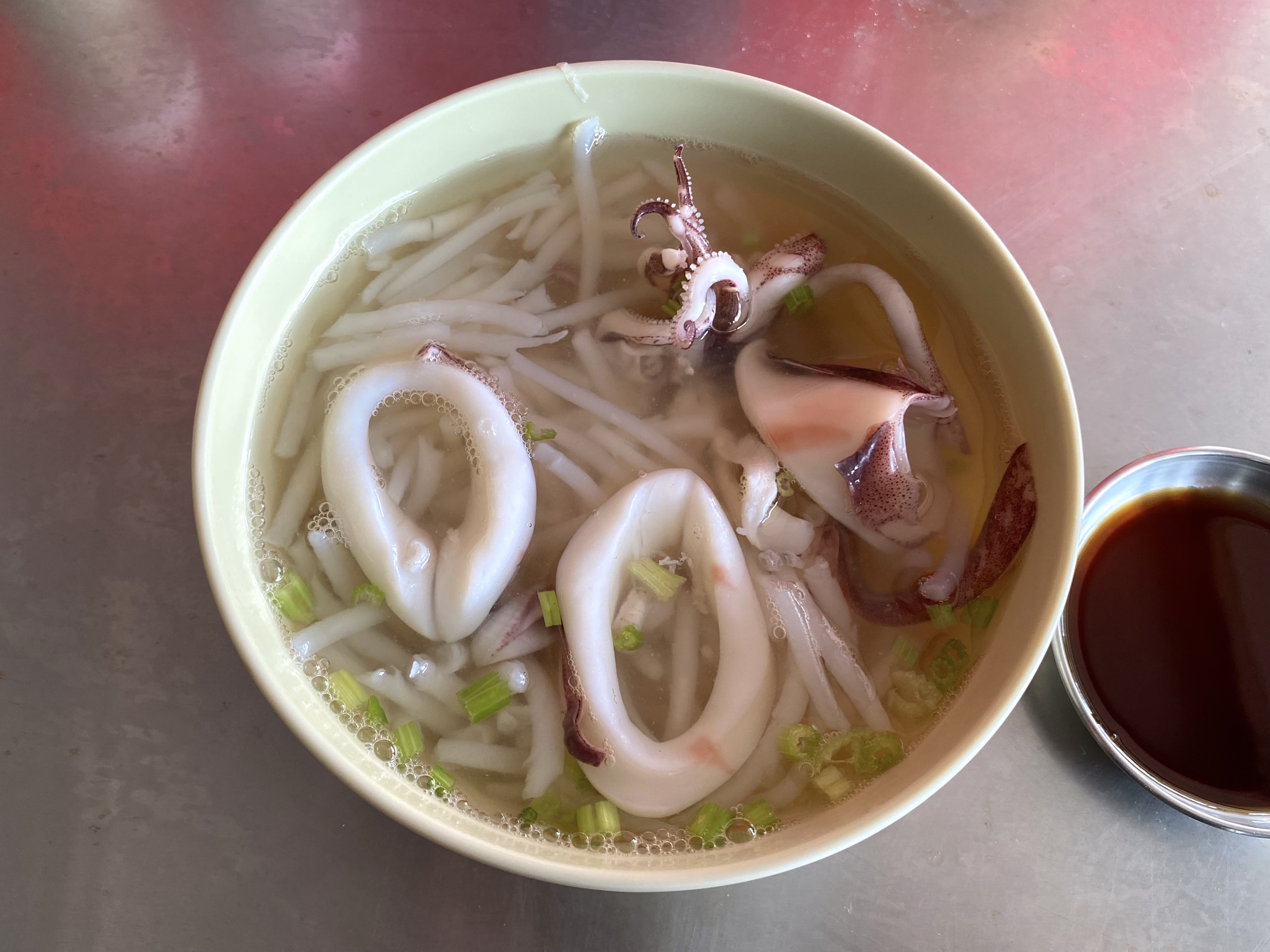
Neritic squid rice noodles – a Tainan specialty.

In Taiwanese cuisine, squid is widely used in home cooking, night market food, rechao, and seafood dishes, appearing in stir-fries, soups, noodle dishes, and rice-based meals. Several locally recognized categories of squid are commonly distinguished by size and species, including sió-kńg (小卷, neritic squid), thò-thiu (透抽, typically referring to spear squid), hue-ki (花枝), ruǎn-si (軟絲) and jiû-hî (魷魚, a general term often applied to larger squid or dried squid products). These distinctions are culinary rather than strictly taxonomic and influence preparation methods and pricing.

Fresh squid is often blanched briefly or simmered in clear broths to highlight its natural sweetness, as seen in regional dishes such as neritic squid rice noodles (小卷米粉) from Tainan. Squid is also commonly stir-fried with vegetables, basil, or celery, or braised in soy-based sauces. Grilled squid is a popular night market item, typically cooked whole or cut into rings and seasoned with soy sauce, garlic, chili, or barbecue spice blends. In addition, dried shredded squid (魷魚絲) is widely consumed as a snack or accompaniment to alcoholic beverages, sometimes lightly roasted and served with chili sauce or mayonnaise. Pre-packaged shredded squid products are also common and are sold in supermarkets and convenience stores throughout Taiwan.

==== Thailand ====
In Thailand, squid is a common protein source added to a variety of soup and stir-fry dishes in fresh form, often as a part of a medley with shrimp, and referred to as talay (ทะเล). In addition, shredded and rolled dried squid is a common snack food found in supermarkets and night markets across the country, often served with a Nam chim (น้ำจิ้ม) dipping sauce. Domestically landed Loligo squid fished from the Gulf of Thailand and the Andaman Sea are the most commonly featured species in each preparation.

==== South Asia ====
In India and Sri Lanka, squid or cuttlefish is eaten in coastal areas such as Kerala and Tamil Nadu. Squid are eaten deep-fried (koonthal fry) or as squid gravy (koonthal varattiyathu/roast). In Kerala and Tamil Nadu, squid is called koonthal, kanava or kadamba. In coastal Karnataka, squid is also called bondaas.

=== Mediterranean region ===
Fried squid (calamari fritti in Italian) is a dish in Mediterranean cuisine, consisting of batter-coated, deep-fried squid (fried for less than two minutes to prevent toughness), which is served plain, with salt and lemon on the side.

In Spain, rabas or calamares a la romana (battered calamari, lit. 'Roman-style calamari') has the calamari rings covered in a thick batter, deep-fried, and served with lemon juice and mayonnaise or aioli. Traditionally in Cantabria and the Basque Country, rabas are cut into straight strips rather than rings. Battered and fried baby squid is known as puntillitas. Squid stewed in its own black ink is called calamares en su tinta or chipirones en su tinta, resulting in a black stew-like dish in which squid meat is very tender and is accompanied by a thick black sauce, usually made with onion, tomato and squid ink, among other ingredients.

In Italy and Spain, squid or cuttlefish ink is eaten in dishes such as paella, risotto, soups and pasta.

In Italy, Spain, Greece, Cyprus, Turkey, Portugal, Slovenia, Albania and Croatia, squid rings and arms are coated in batter and fried in oil. Other recipes from these regions feature squid (or octopus) simmered slowly, with vegetables such as squash or tomato. When frying, the squid flesh is kept tender due to a short cooking time; when simmering, the flesh is most tender when cooking is prolonged with reduced temperature. In Greece or Cyprus it is served also with tzatziki, a Greek yoghurt, cucumber and mint dip.

In Sardinia, squid are served with a sauce made from lemon, garlic, parsley, and olive oil.

In Portugal, lulas are commonly eaten grilled whole, in kebabs ("espetadas") of squid rings with bell peppers and onion, or stewed, stuffed with minced meat (lulas recheadas); the battered version is known as lulas à sevilhana, named after Seville, the Andalusian city that popularised the dish. The city of Setúbal is also known for its fried cuttlefish (choco frito à setubalense).

In Malta, klamar mimli involves stuffing the squid with rice, breadcrumbs, parsley, garlic and capers and then gently stewing in red wine.

In Slovenia, squid are eaten grilled and stuffed with pršut and cheese, with blitva (Swiss chard).

In Egypt, Cyprus, and Turkey, squid rings and arms are coated in batter and fried in oil. Other recipes from these regions simmer squid with vegetables. Squid is also often stuffed.

In Lebanon, Turkey, and Palestine, fried squid is served with tarator, a sauce made using tahini. Like many seafood dishes, it may be served with a slice of lemon.

=== Russia ===
In Russia, a lightly boiled julienned squid with onion rings, garnished with mayonnaise, makes a salad. Another dish is a squid stuffed with rice and vegetables and then roasted.

=== Commonwealth ===
In South Africa, Australia and New Zealand, fried calamari is popular in fish and chip shops; imitation calamari of whitefish may also be used.

In Australia, salt and pepper squid is a common dish in restaurants, fish and chip shops, and pubs.

=== North America ===
In North America, fried squid is a staple in seafood and Italian restaurants. It is often served as an appetizer, garnished with parsley, or sprinkled with Italian-style parmesan cheese. It is served with dips: peppercorn mayonnaise, tzatziki, marinara sauce, tartar sauce, or cocktail sauce. In Mexico it is served with local hot sauce. Other dips, such as ketchup, aioli, and olive oil are used. In the United States, the government and industry worked together to popularize calamari consumption in the 1990s.

In the United States, in an attempt to popularize squid as a protein source in the 1970s, researchers at Massachusetts Institute of Technology developed a squid-gutting machine, and submitted squid cocktail, rings, and chowder to a 70-person tasting panel for market research. Despite a general lack of popularity of squid in the United States, as aside from the internal "ethnic market" polling had shown a negative public perception of squid foods, the tasting panel gave the dishes "high marks".

During the 2020 Democratic National Convention, calamari was featured prominently during the virtual roll call for the state of Rhode Island.

== Etymology ==
The English name calamari comes from the Italian calamari (plural of calamaro), Spanish calamares (plural of calamar), and Modern Greek καλαμάρι kalamári. Ultimately, all of these terms derive from the Late Latin calamarium, "pen case" or "ink pot", itself from the Latin calamarius, "pertaining to a writing-reed", after the resemblance in shape and the inky fluid that squid secrete; calamarius in turn derives from the Greek κάλαμος kalamos 'reed' or 'pen'.

== Nutritional value ==
The nutritional value of squid compares favorably with fish, being high in protein and phosphorus with trace amounts of calcium, thiamine, and riboflavin. Squid are 67.5–80.7% protein and 2.22–8.48% fat. A 2016 study of loligo squid found that 13% of the wet weight was oil, which is a rich source of omega-3 and omega-6 fatty acids (2.78% arachidonic acid, 3.10% linolenic acid, 5.20% linoleic acid, 15.40% docosahexaenoic acid (DHA), and 9.60% eicosapentaenoic acid (EPA)).

== Allergies ==
Allergies to calamari can occur. As with other molluscs, the allergen is usually tropomyosin.

== Gallery ==
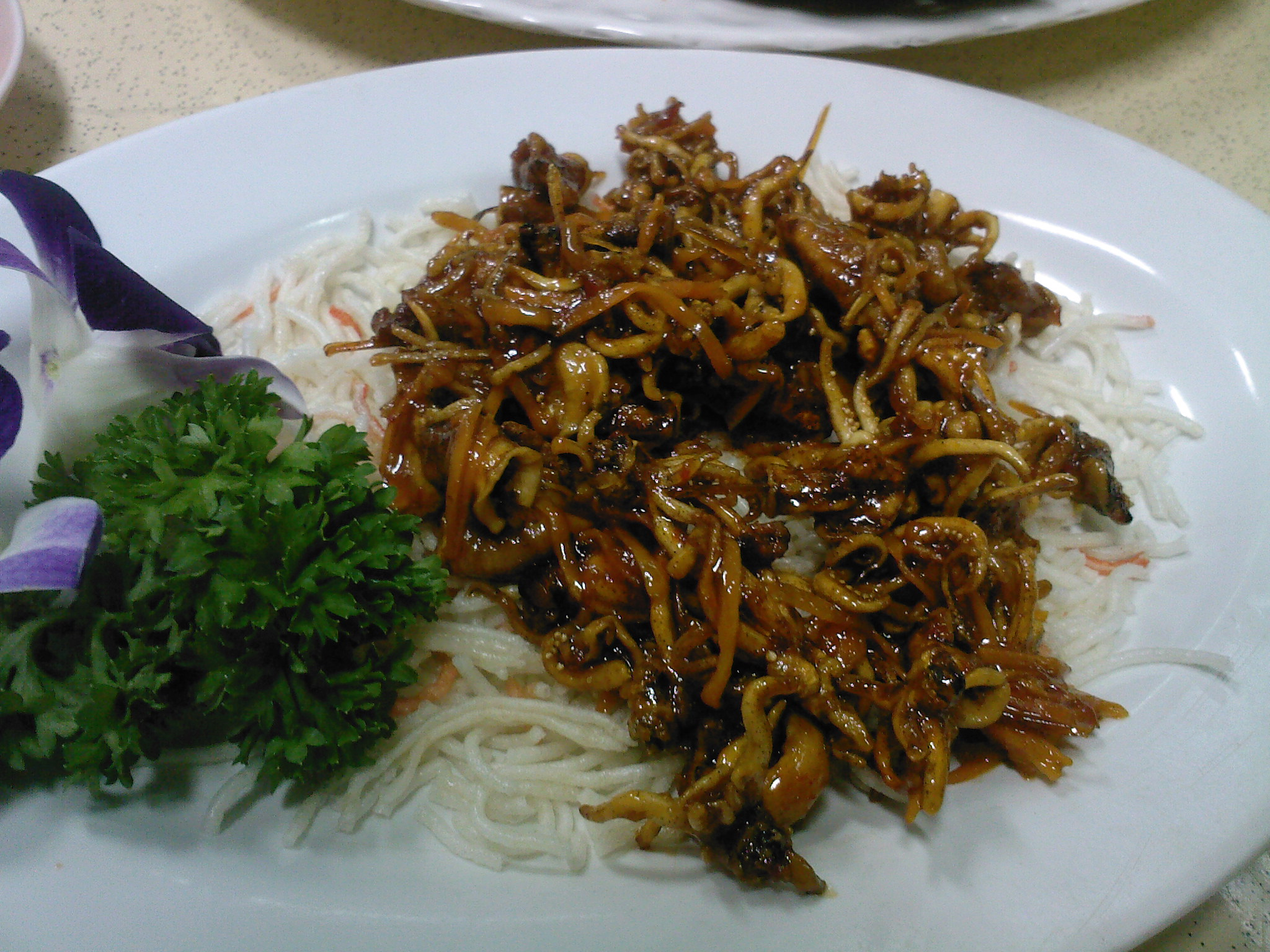
Chinese-style fried baby squid

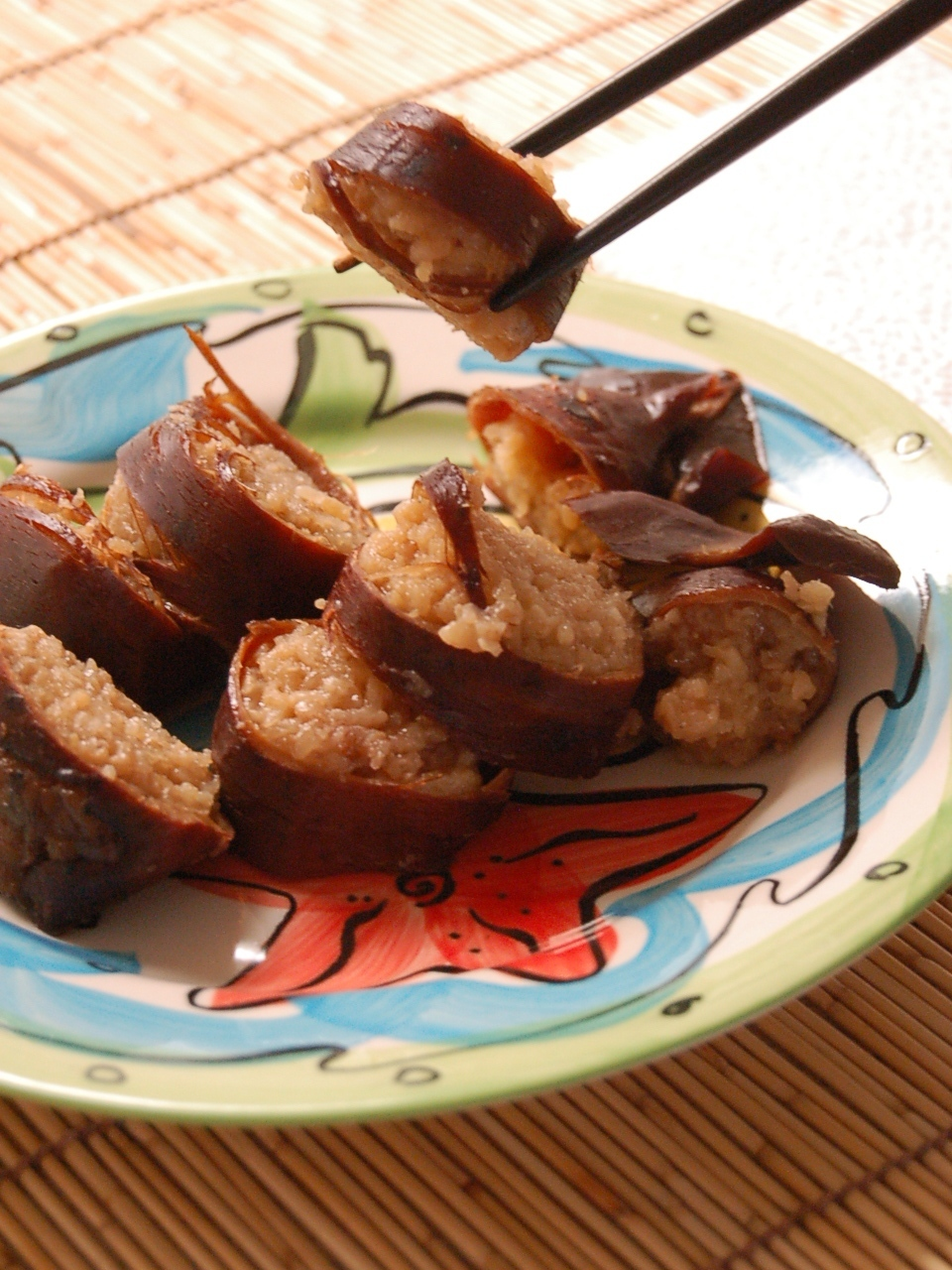
Japanese Ikameshi

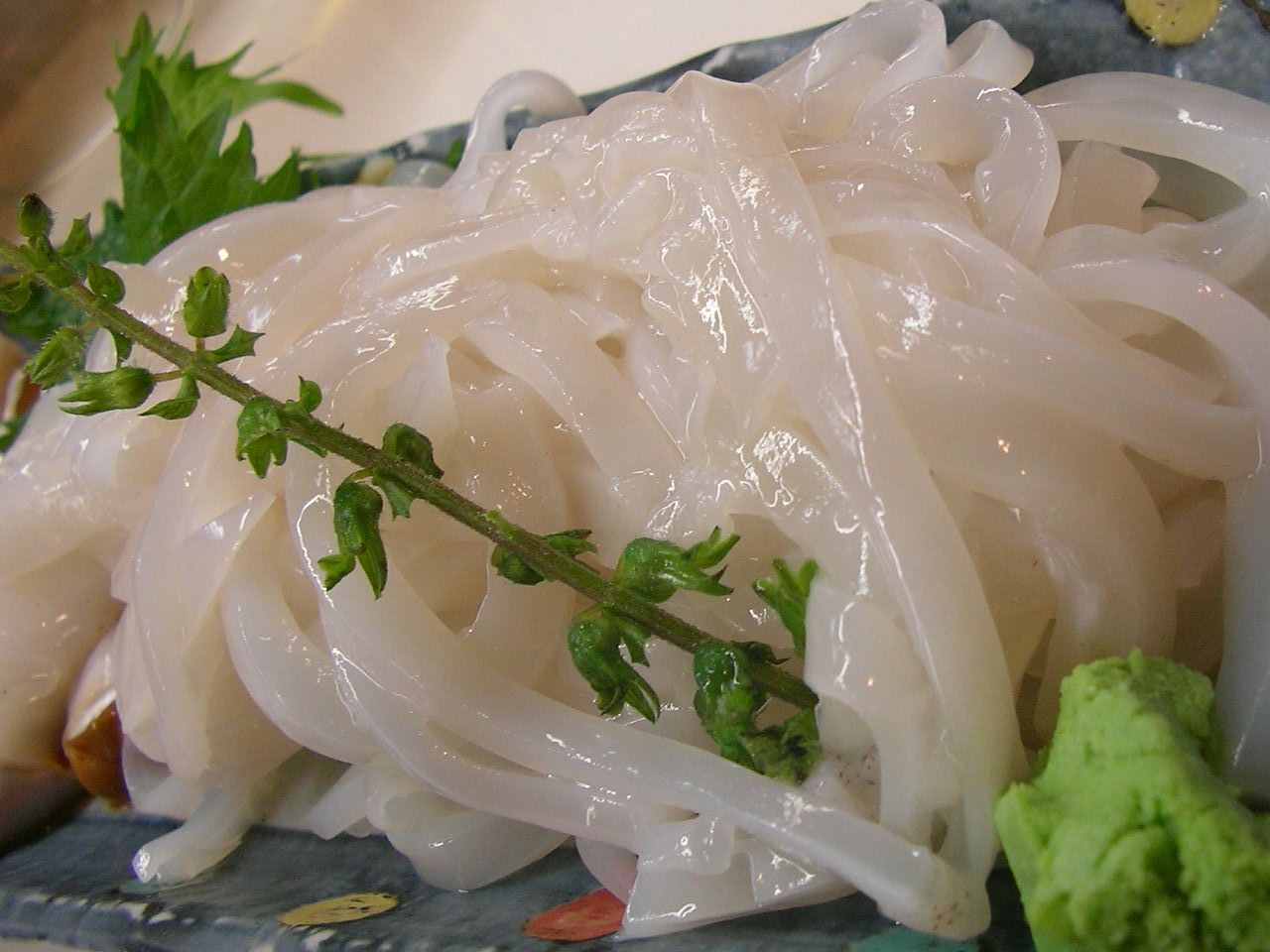
Japanese Ika Sōmen (squid noodle)

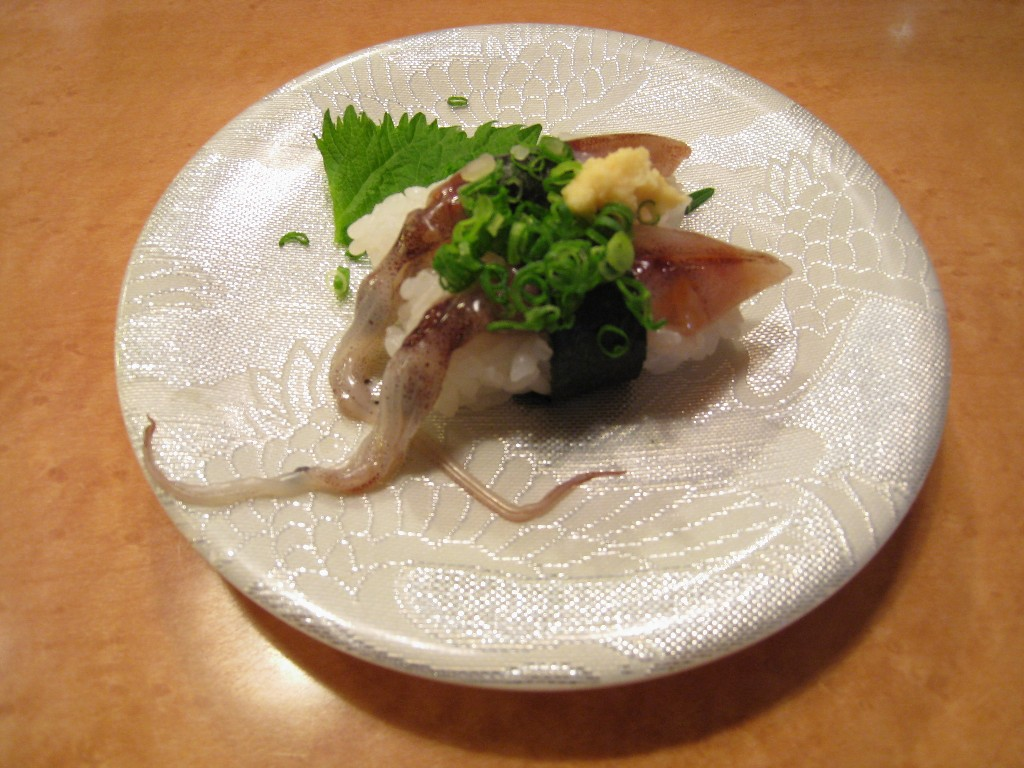
Japanese sushi

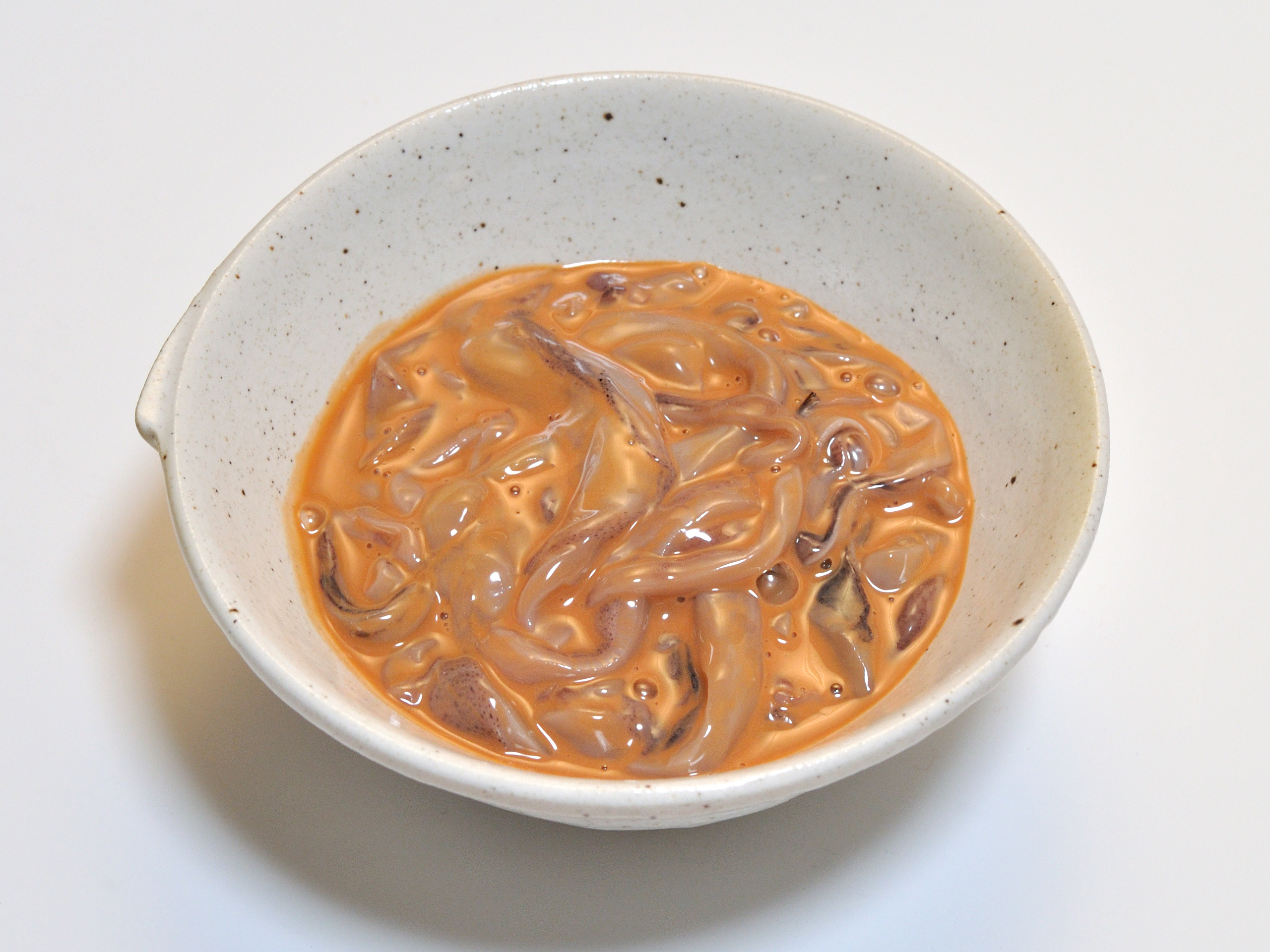
Japanese Ika no shiokara

Squid steaks, uncooked

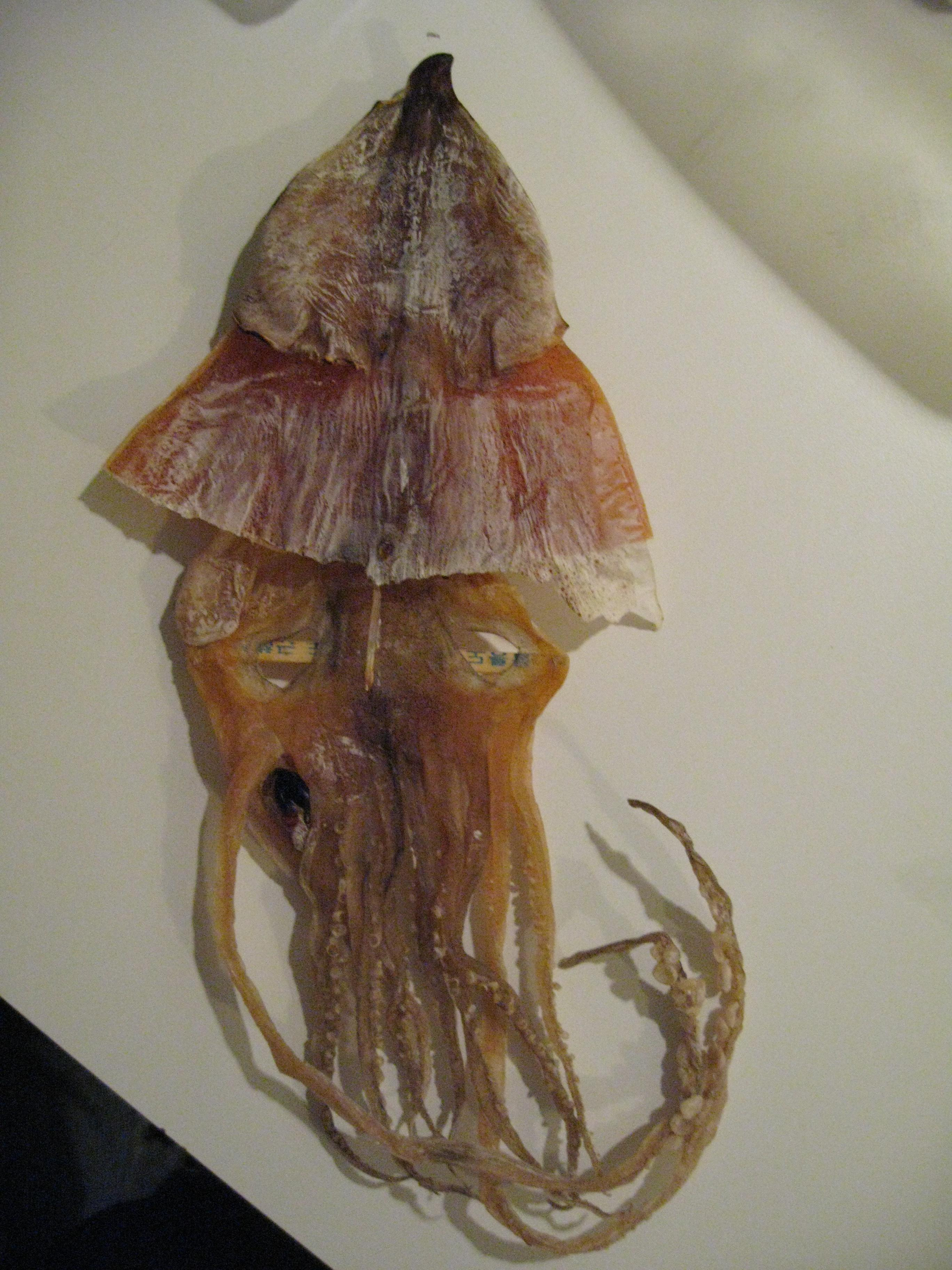
Squid jerky

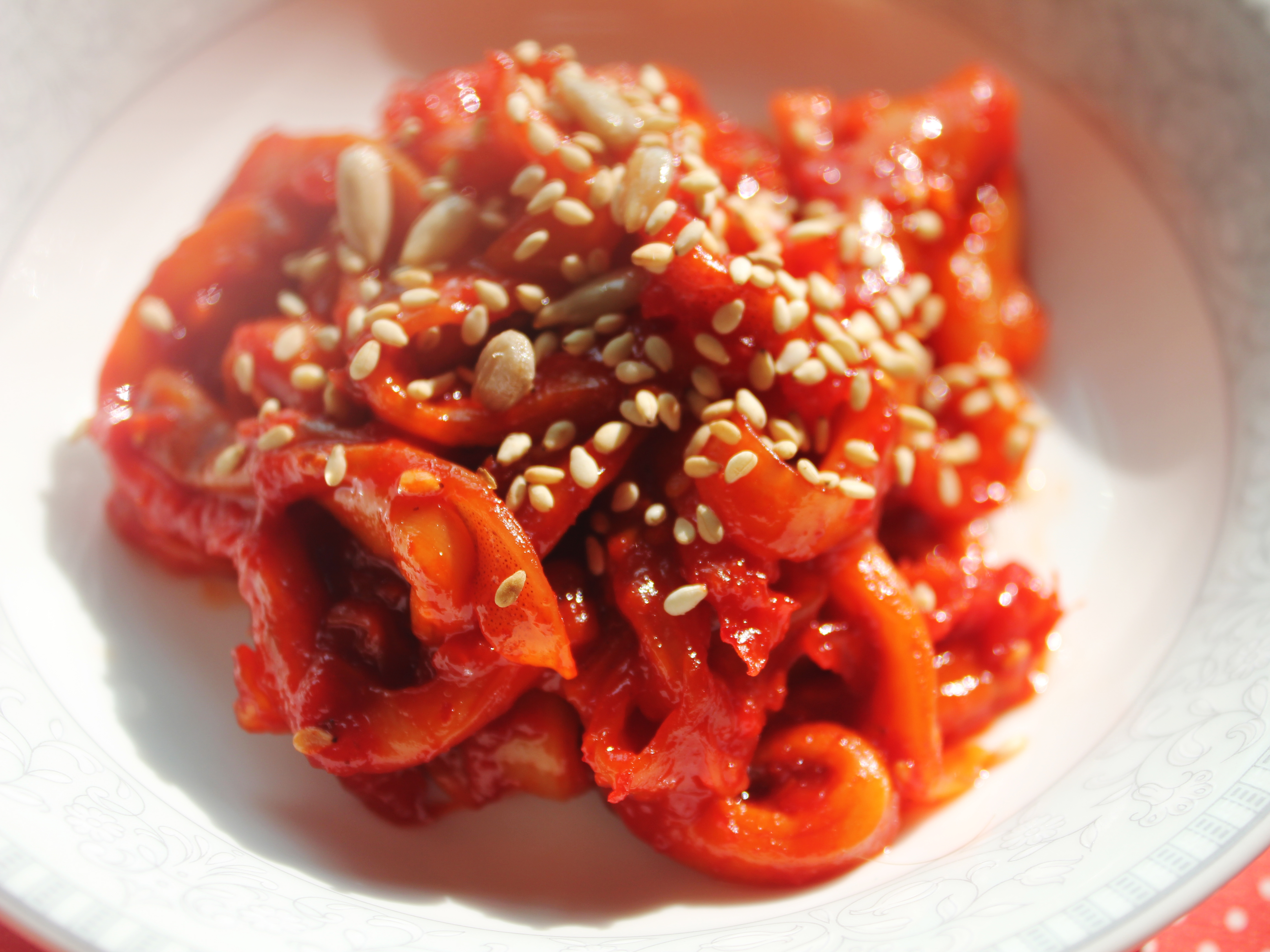
Korean ojingeo-jeot (salted squid)

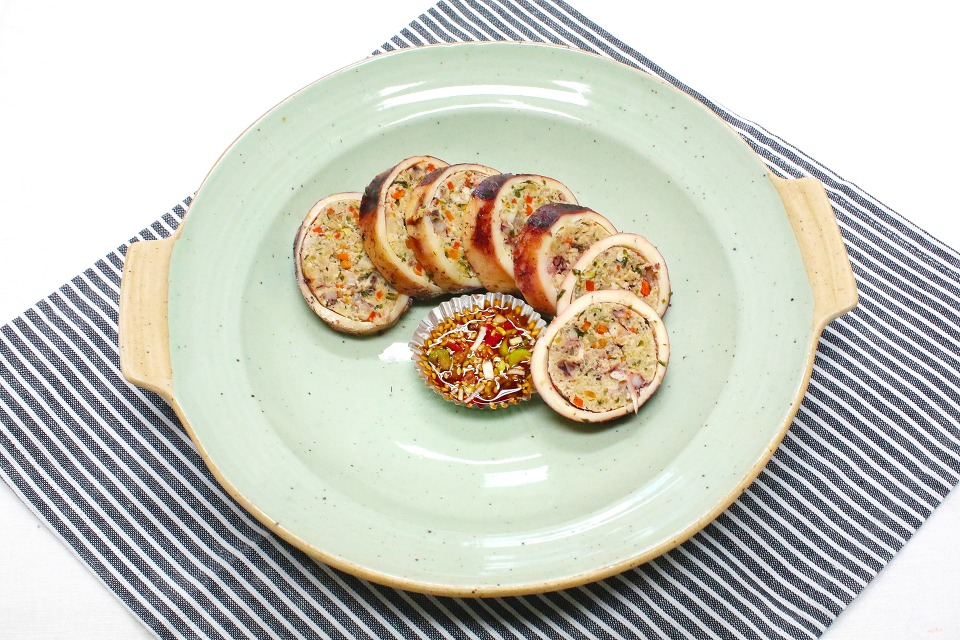
Korean ojingeo-sundae (stuffed squid)

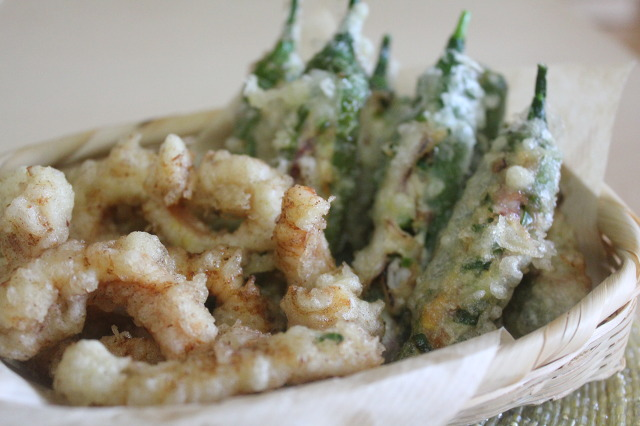
Korean Ojingeo-Twigim along with Gochu-Twigim. Ojingeo is squid whereas Gochu is pepper

== See also ==
- Cuttlefish as food
- Fish as food
- List of deep-fried foods
- List of seafood dishes
- Octopus as food
- Pain in invertebrates
