= Daegu (disambiguation) =

Daegu is a metropolitan city in South Korea.

Daegu or Taegu may also refer to:

- Daegu International Airport
- Battle of Taegu, an invasion and battle during the Korean War
- Daegu Catholic University
- Daegu FC
- Taegu (Hawaiian dish) similar to ojingeo-chae-bokkeum

== See also ==
- Revised Romanization of Korean, for explanation of the two spellings
