= Taegu (Hawaiian dish) =

Hawaii-adapted Korean side dish of marinated dried cod or cuttlefish

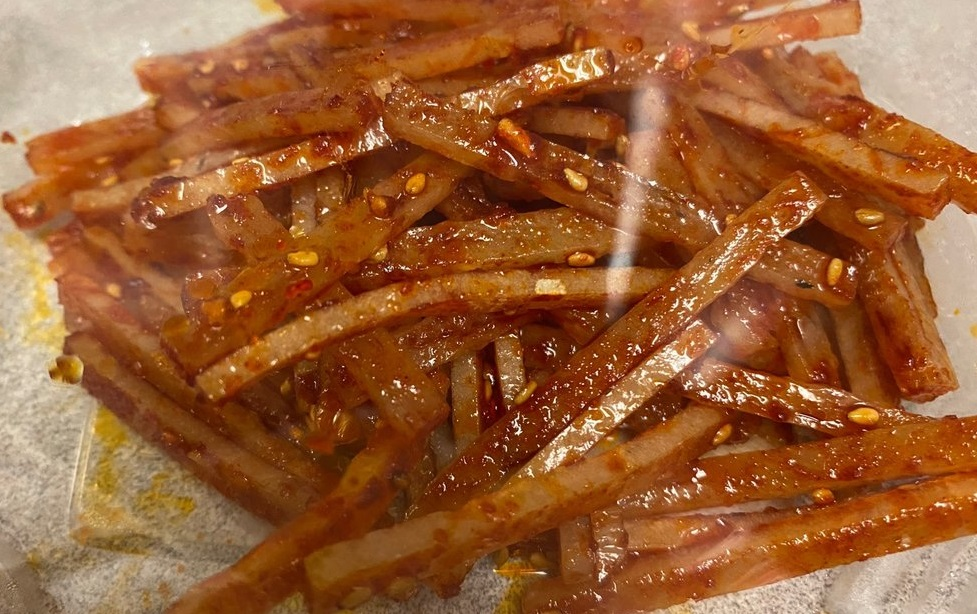
- Taegu of dried codfish
- Place of origin: Korea
- Region or state: Hawaii
- Main ingredients: Dried cod or dried cuttlefish/squid,
- Ingredients generally used: Gochujang, gochugaru, sugar or honey, soy sauce, sesame oil
- Similar dishes: Ojingeo-chae-bokkeum

Taegu is a popular side dish in Hawaii related to Korean ojingeo-chae-bokkeum. It was perhaps introduced to Hawaii by the Koreans in the early 1900s. Taegu is often sold next to poke in the seafood counters of grocery stores and Korean specialty shops.

Taegu (대구) is a Korean term for codfish. While commercial taegu is commonly made with dried cod, most home recipes still use dried shredded cuttlefish as it is more widely familiar and available. Taegu is quite similar to the original Korean ojingeo-chae-bokkeum recipe in terms of ingredients. However, Hawaii recipes generally do not "bokkeum," or stir-fry, the seafood nor cook the seasonings. Rather all the ingredients are combined and left to marinate.

In contemporary times, the flavor profile and sauce mixture are generically called taegu. It is popularly applied to other dishes such as fresh tuna for "taegu poke", dried tuna for "aku taegu", or as a dressing to noodles and even fried chicken.

== Preparation ==
If using dried cod, it is soaked in water before shredding. The cod or dried cuttlefish are cut or shredded into smaller pieces, between a julienne and batonnet. They are then combined with gochujang, gochugaru, honey, soy sauce, sesame oil, and sesame seeds and left to marinate from 30 minutes to overnight before serving.

== Gallery ==
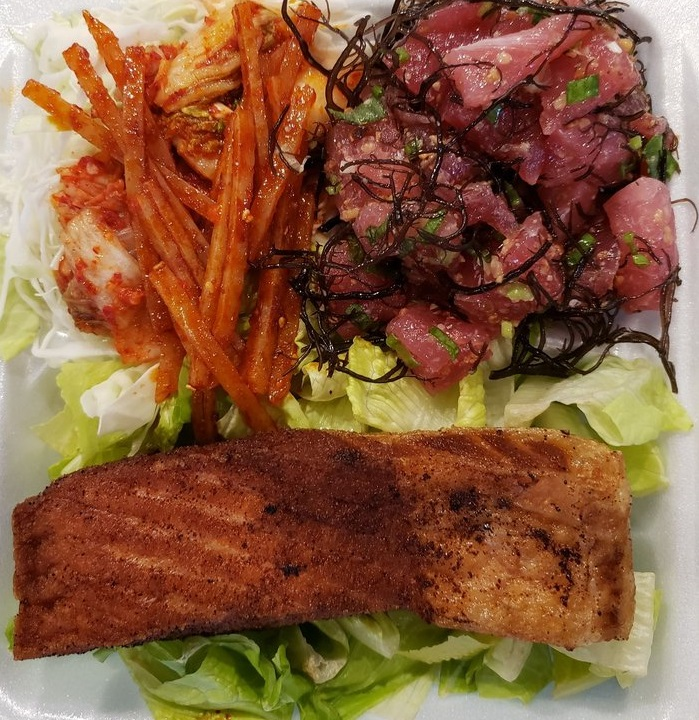
Side dish of taegu (cod) with poke and fried salmon mixed plate

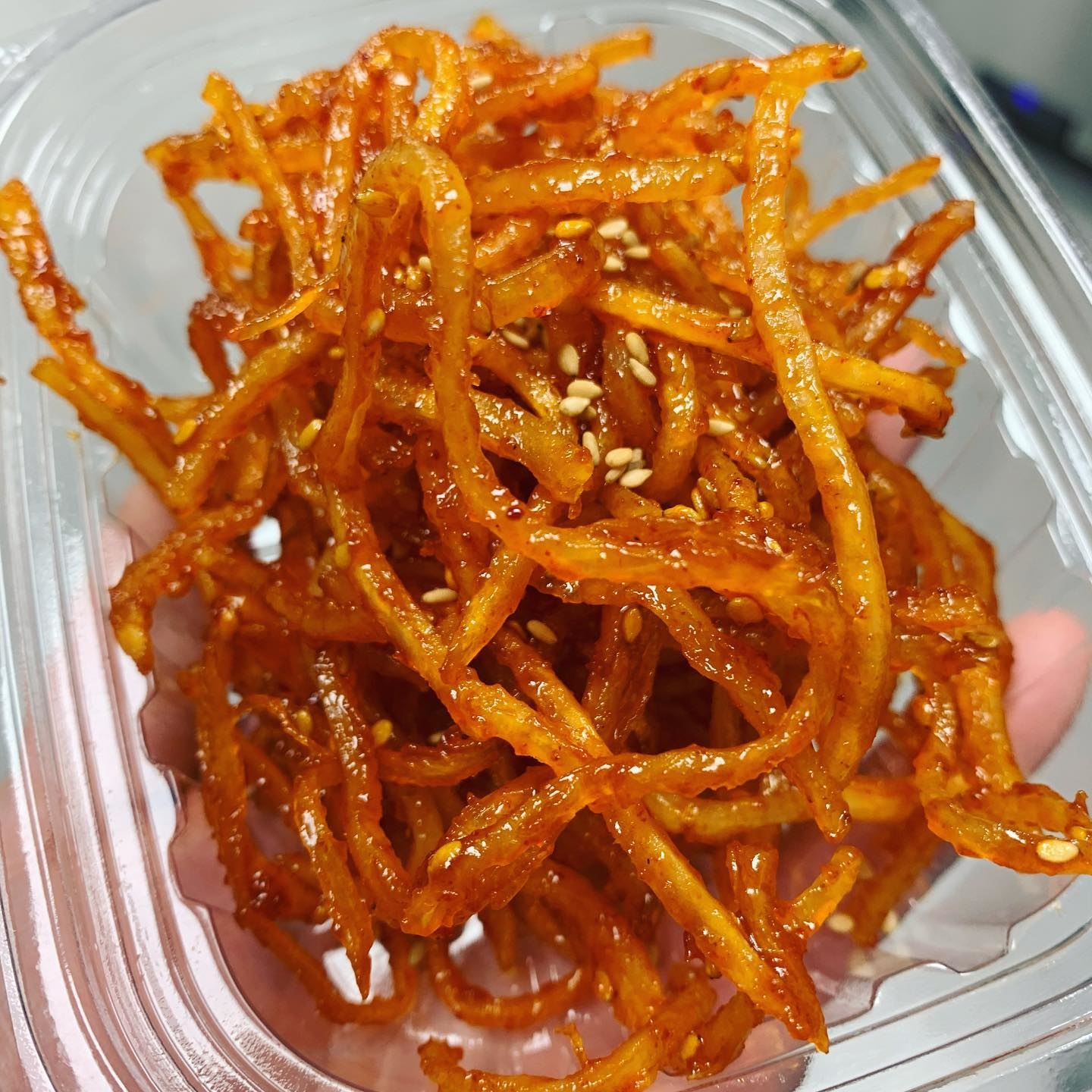
Taegu of cuttlefish

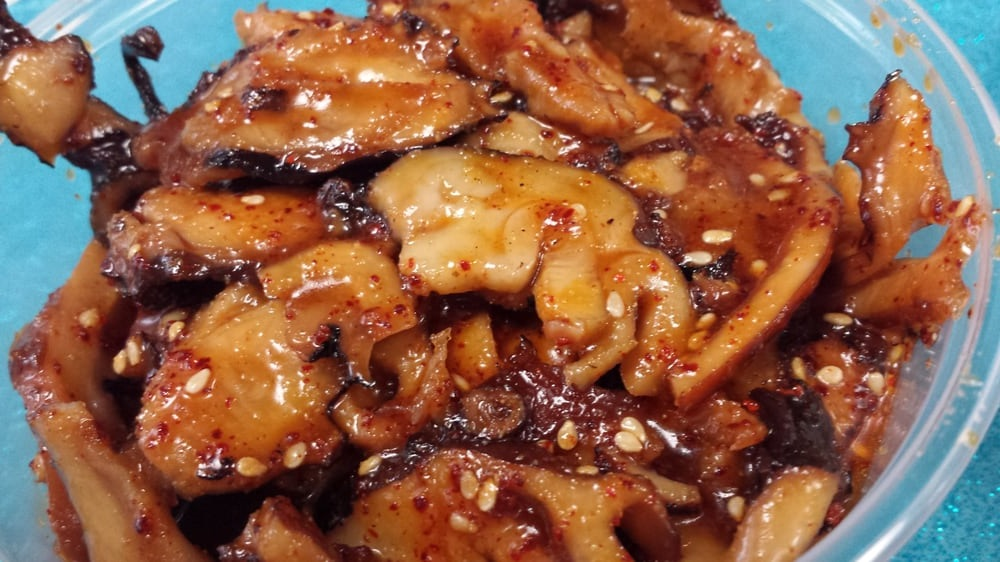
Taegu of tako (octopus)

== See also ==
- Ojingeo-chae-bokkeum – Korean stir-fried spicy squid dish
