= Dried shredded squid =

Seafood product

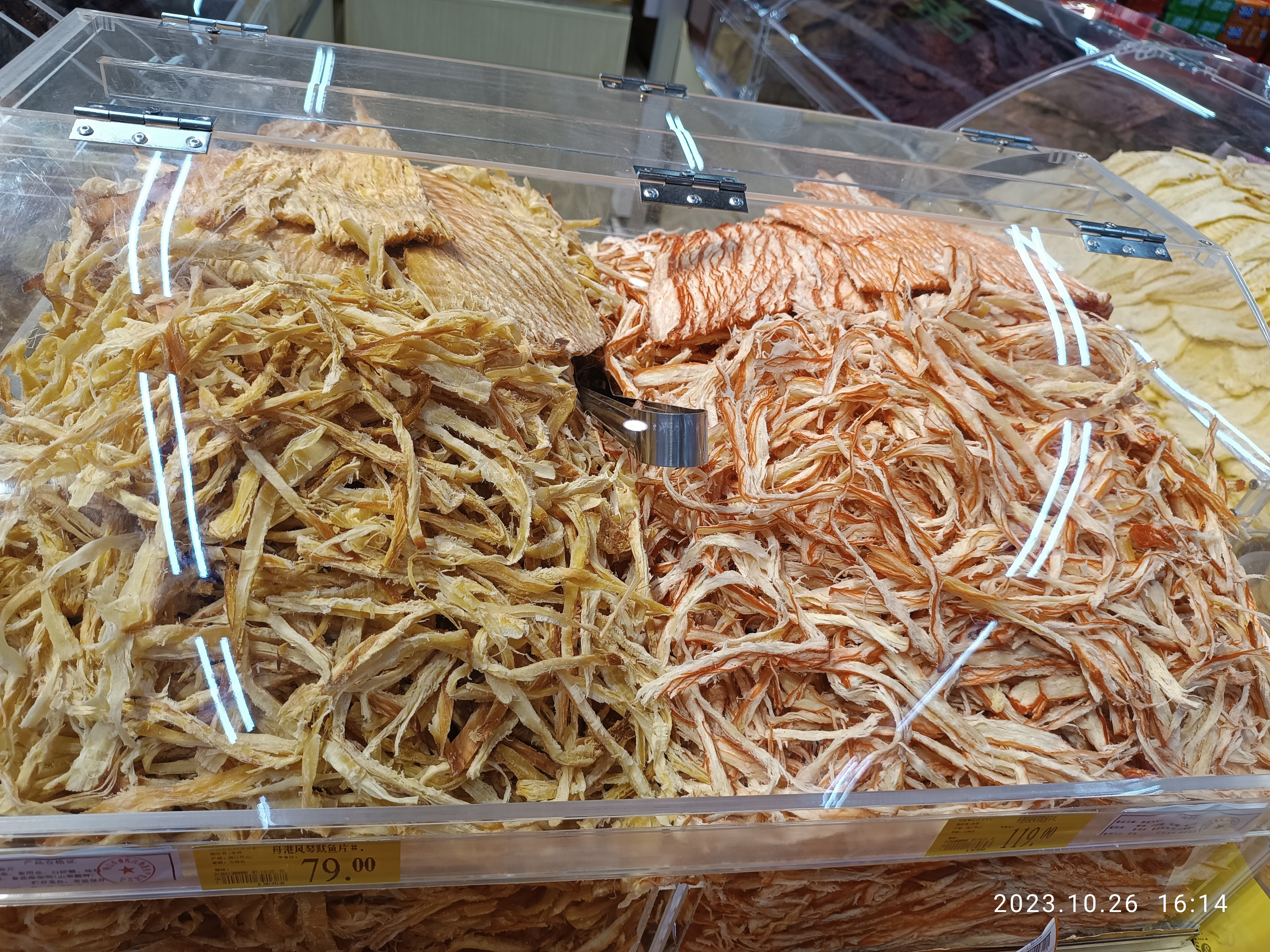
- Dried shredded squid in Shenzhen
- Alternative names: Youyusi, youyupian, saki-ika, surume, ojingeo-chae
- Course: Snack
- Main ingredients: Squid

Dried shredded squid

Chinese name (by strand)
- Traditional Chinese: 魷魚絲/鰇魚絲
- Simplified Chinese: 鱿鱼丝
- Hanyu Pinyin: yóu yú sī
- Jyutping: jau4 jyu4*2 si1
- Literal meaning: squid strand
Transcriptions
Standard Mandarin
- Hanyu Pinyin: yóu yú sī
Yue: Cantonese
- Jyutping: jau4 jyu4*2 si1
Southern Min
- Hokkien POJ: jiû-hî-chhuì

Chinese name (by slice)
- Traditional Chinese: 魷魚片
- Simplified Chinese: 鱿鱼片
- Hanyu Pinyin: yóu yú piàn
- Jyutping: jau4 jyu4*2 pin3
Transcriptions
Standard Mandarin
- Hanyu Pinyin: yóu yú piàn
Yue: Cantonese
- Jyutping: jau4 jyu4*2 pin3

Korean name
- Hangul: 오징어채
Transcriptions
- Revised Romanization: ojingeochae
- McCune–Reischauer: ojingŏch'ae

Japanese name
- Kanji: 裂きイカ
- Kana: さきいか
Transcriptions
- Romanization: saki ika

Alternative Japanese name
- Kanji: 鯣 (chiefly unshredded)
- Kana: するめ
Transcriptions
- Romanization: surume

Dried shredded squid are dried and shredded squid or cuttlefish pieces commonly found in coastal Asian countries, Russia, and Hawaii. The snack is also referred to as dried shredded cuttlefish.

== History and origins ==
Historically, squid is common in Pacific coastal regions of East Asia and Southeast Asia. After the packaged form began shipping to English-speaking regions, the Japanese word surume and yóu yú sī in Chinese for this form of seafood was translated as "dried shredded squid" and imprinted on packages. The snack was popularized, sold, and consumed regularly in Hong Kong during the 1970s. Shredded squid began being sold in Macau as an addition to their almond biscuit. In China, it is usually considered to be a light snack, sold in bags in many department stores in major cities. In Japan, dried shredded squid is popularly served as an otsumami (snack consumed while drinking alcohol). In Korean cuisine, dried shredded squid is eaten as anju (food to eat while drinking) and as banchan (small side dishes), such as the dish ojingeochae bokkeum, which is made by stir-frying dried shredded squid seasoned with a mixture of gochujang (chili pepper paste), garlics, and mullyeot (corn syrup-like condiment). In Singapore, it was also popular amongst the older generation when it was sold in a mama shop. It was marketed as the Chewing gum of the Orientals by the food manufacturing company Ken Ken in the 1970s, before the chewing gum ban in Singapore in 1992.

== Preparation ==
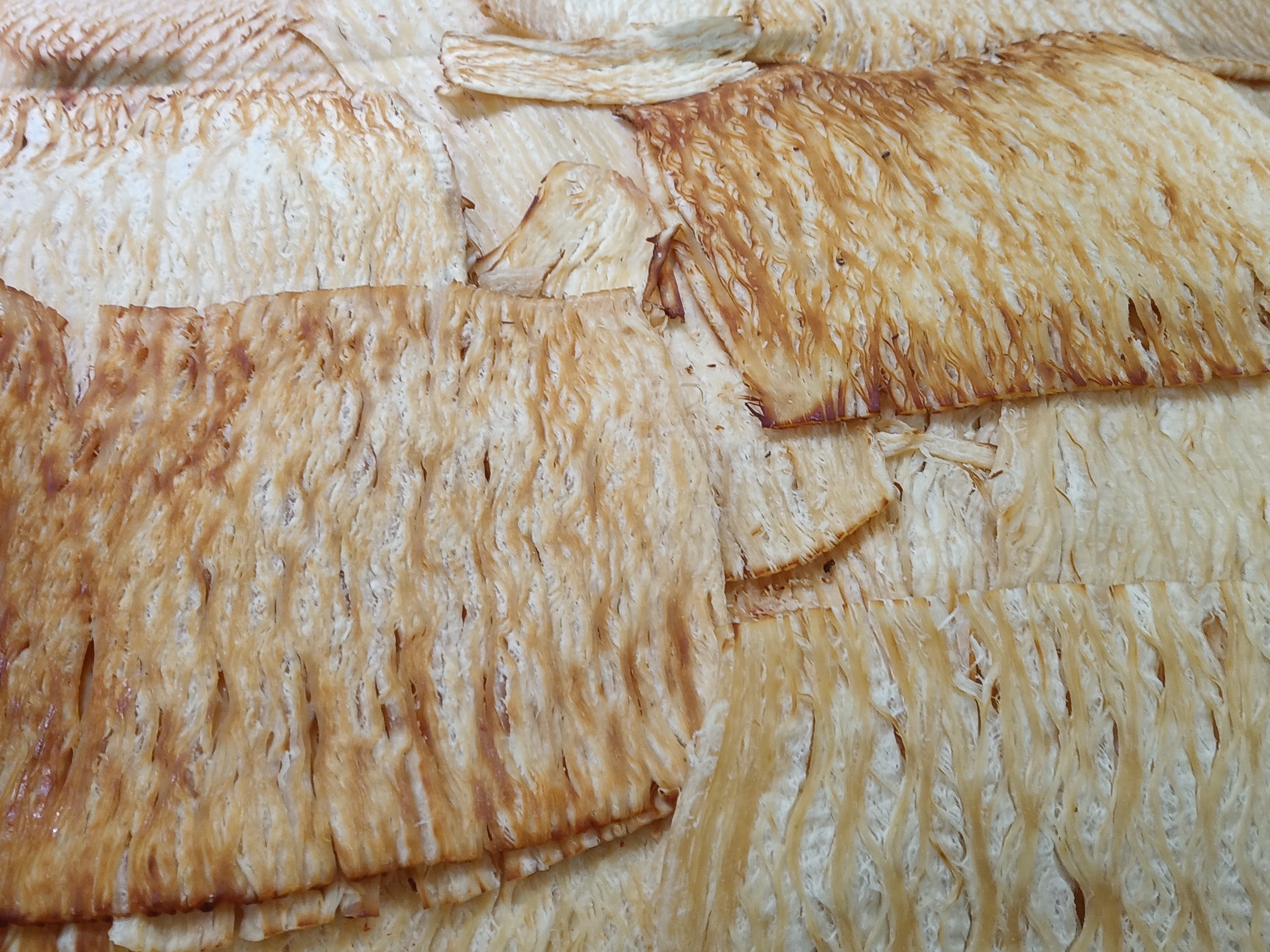
Before shredding

Northern Pacific squid is separated into different parts and skinned; cooked at 65–80 °C for 3–5 minutes; and cooled, grated and seasoned at a temperature below 20 °C for more than four hours. Sugar, salt, sorbitol, sweeteners, organic acid, and MSG are typical additives. They are then dried at 40–45 °C for 12–20 hours until it reaches a moisture level of 40%. It is then aged in a cold room for two weeks or longer and dried at a higher temperature of 110–120 °C for 3–5 minutes. It is then machine shredded and seasoned for a second time and dried again to a reduced moisture level of 25–27%. At this phase, the color is yellow or brownish. The amino acids on the squid are revealed by the increase in brown color over prolonged storage time. Vacuum packaging or nitrogen-filled packaging also increases browning. Consumers generally do not want excessive browning.

== Packaging ==
The most common distribution method in today's Asian countries is the prepackaged format. The bags are usually sealed airtight to keep the squid chewy and tough. Depending on the company doing the packaging or preparation, each brand usually has its own ratio of MSG added.

== Cultural significance ==
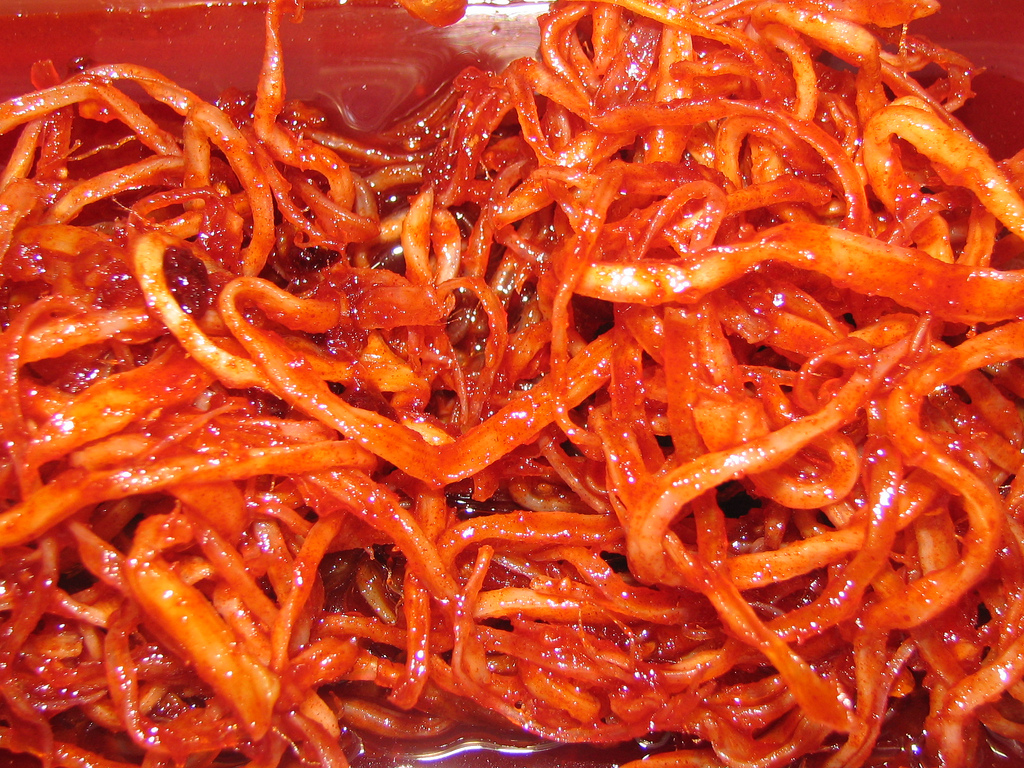
Ojingeochae bokkeum, a Korean dried squid stir-fried in gochujang chili paste

"Chewing gum of the Orientals" is the tagline for a Singaporean snack, Pon Pon, seasoned and prepared dried shredded squid. It was sold in the early 1960s in Singapore as Pon Pon, and later as Ken Ken, before the ban on chewing gum in Singapore in 1992. The concept stuck with Singaporeans. Many older Singaporeans grew up eating this cuttlefish snack before the advent of modern-day snacks such as chocolates and chips. Ken Ken Cuttlefish is still available in all the major supermarkets in Singapore.

The Ken Ken prepared cuttlefish "Chewing gum of the Orientals" is one of the nostalgic snacks that older Singaporeans remember, like White Rabbit and haw flakes. The snack was sold in mamak shops along the streets in Singapore. These were little provision stores that provided daily amenities and snacks to the community in olden Singapore. This was before the entrance of large chain supermarkets that caused rising competition towards the mamak shop's survival. Snacks like prepared cuttlefish that were popular amongst the older generation are slowly being phased out. The younger generation of Singaporeans is more westernised and less likely to form a taste for the traditional snack. The snack with its iconic green and white packaging was showcased in the Images of Singapore museum in Sentosa.

== Taste and texture ==
Joe Distefano from The Village Voice describes it as “The fibrous bits are just chewy enough to give your jaws a slight work out. A goodly amount of sugar, chili pepper, and salt help round out the funky fishiness.”

== Alternate preparations ==
Not all dried squid products are shredded; some are prepared in rolled or flattened forms, often using different squid species. For example, Thai-style rolled squid is typically made from Loligo squid, which are smaller and more tender than the larger species commonly used for shredding. These variations offer distinct textures and are often enjoyed as snacks throughout East and Southeast Asia.

== Contamination ==
News reports have claimed that arsenic and other toxic metals have been found in dried shredded squid packaged in Hong Kong.

== See also ==
- Jerky
- List of dried foods
- List of seafood dishes
- Rousong
- Salted squid
