= Ojingeo-chae-bokkeum =

Korean stir-fried spicy squid dish

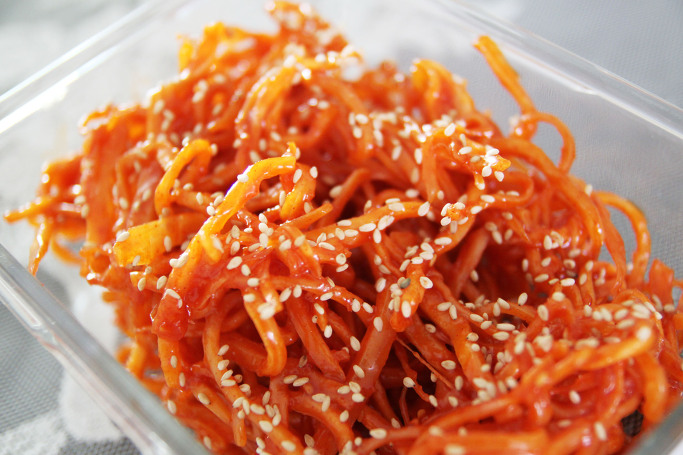
- Type: Bokkeum
- Place of origin: Korea
- Associated cuisine: Korean cuisine
- Main ingredients: Dried shredded squid

Korean name
- Hangul: 오징어채볶음
- RR: ojingeochaebokkeum
- MR: ojingŏch'aebokkŭm
- IPA: [o.dʑiŋ.ʌ.tɕʰɛ.bo.k͈ɯm]

Ojingeo-chae-bokkeum (Korean: 오징어채볶음) is a bokkeum (stir-fried dish) made with dried shredded squid—called ojingeo-chae in Korean— and gochujang-based sauce. Like other dry banchan (side dish), it can be stored for a long time and retain its taste.

== Preparation ==
Dried shredded squid are cut into short pieces, stir-fried in oil, and coated with the sauce mixture made by mixing and boiling gochujang (chili paste), sugar, rice cooking wine, and water. Sesame oil and toasted sesame seeds are sprinkled on top when served.

== In Hawaii ==
A similar side dish is known as taegu, the Korean term for "codfish". While commercial taegu is commonly made with dried cod, most home recipes still use dried shredded cuttlefish as it is more familiar. However, the seafood is usually not stir-fried but marinated.

== Photos ==
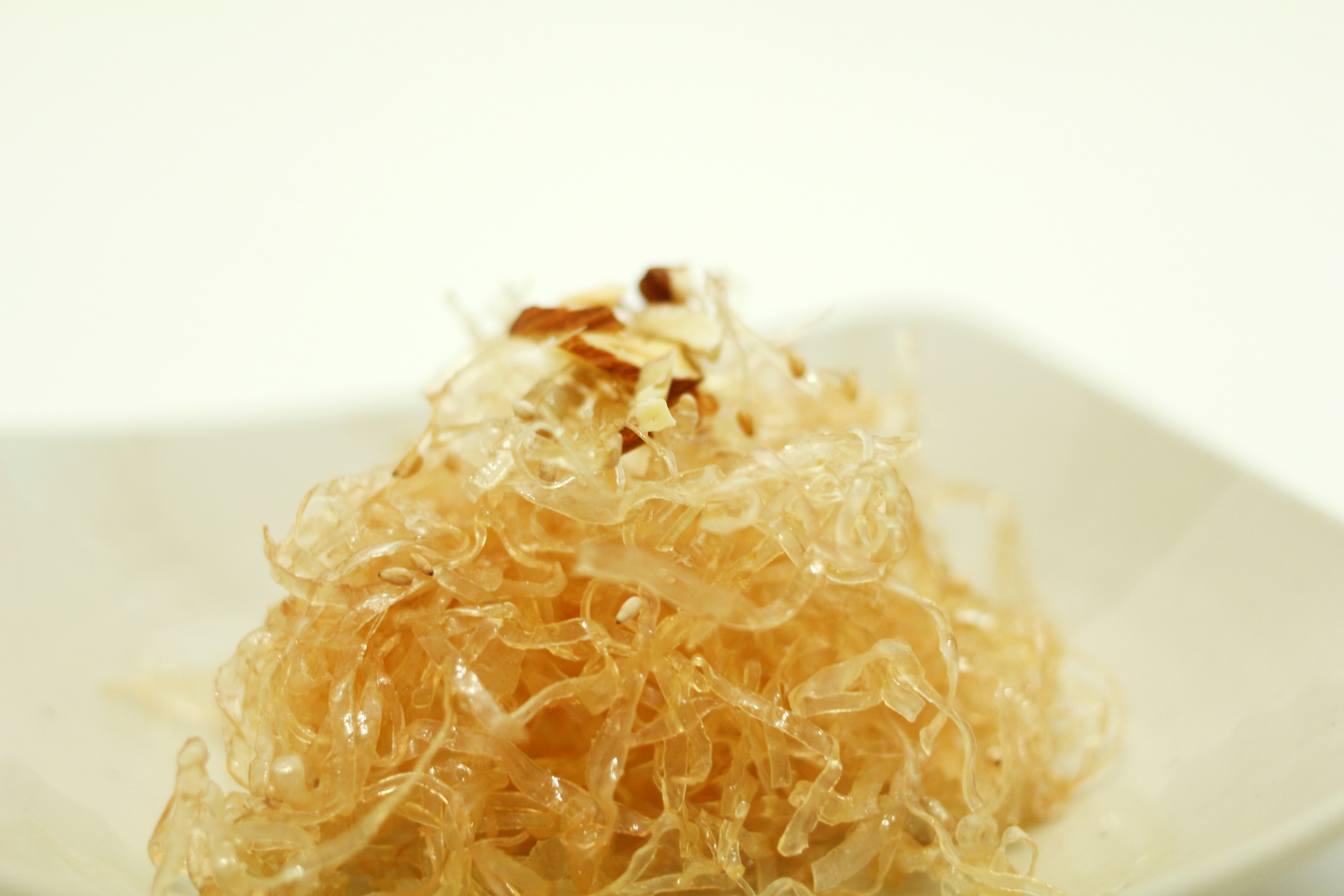
White (non-spicy) version

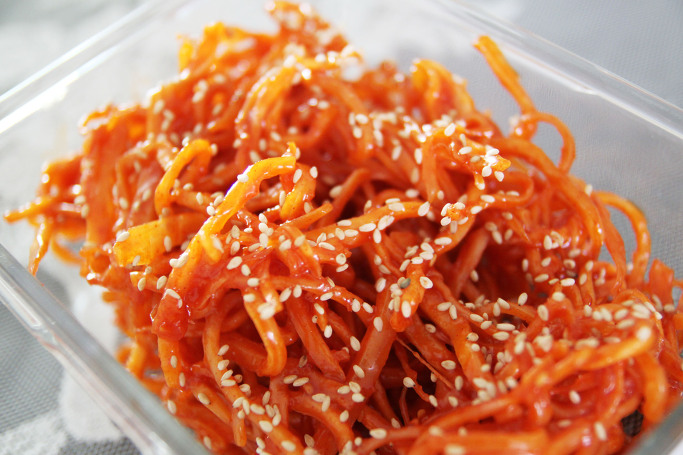
Red (spicy) version

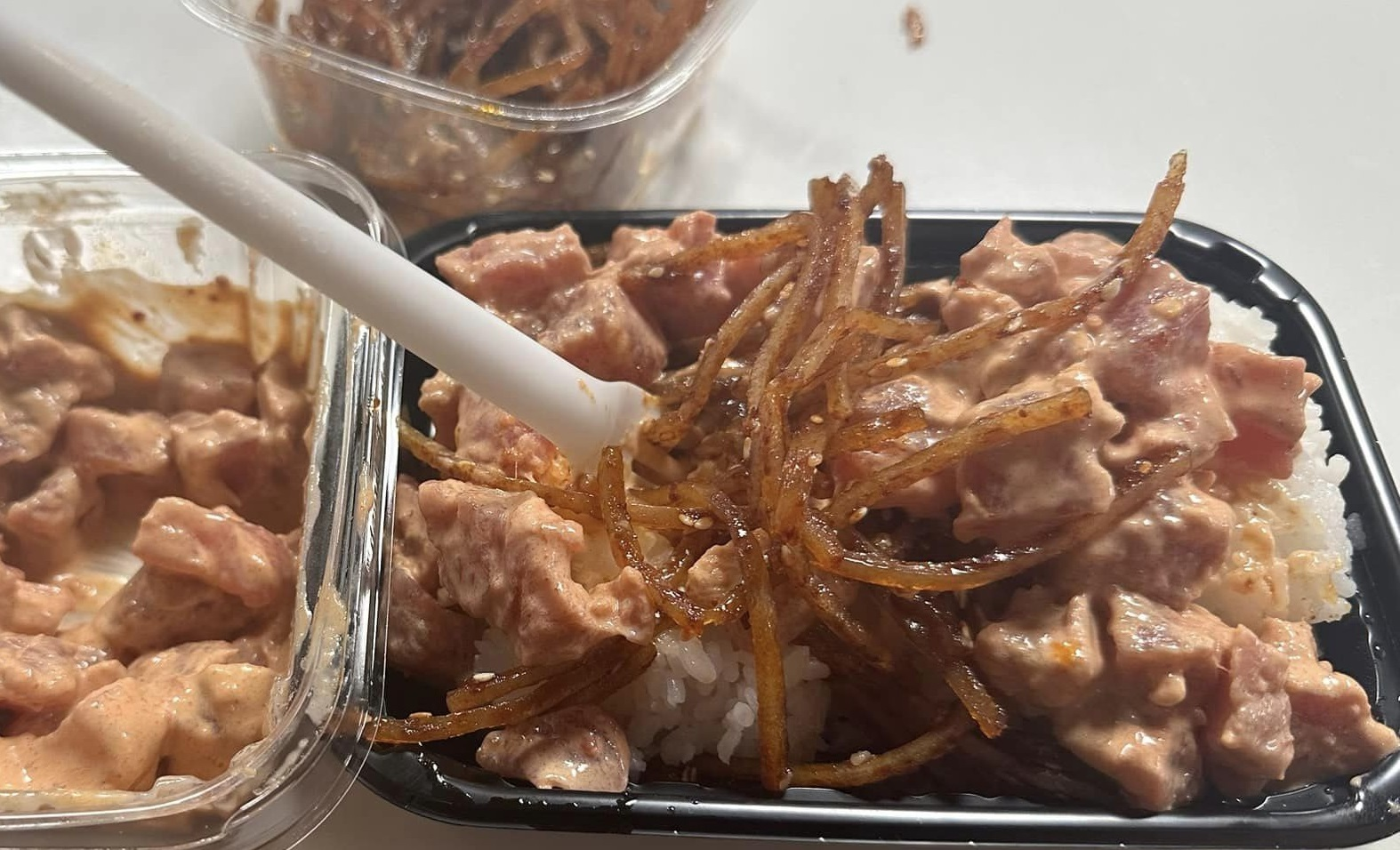
Spicy taegu with Hawaiian poke
