= Ojingeo-jeot =

Korean salted fermented squid dish

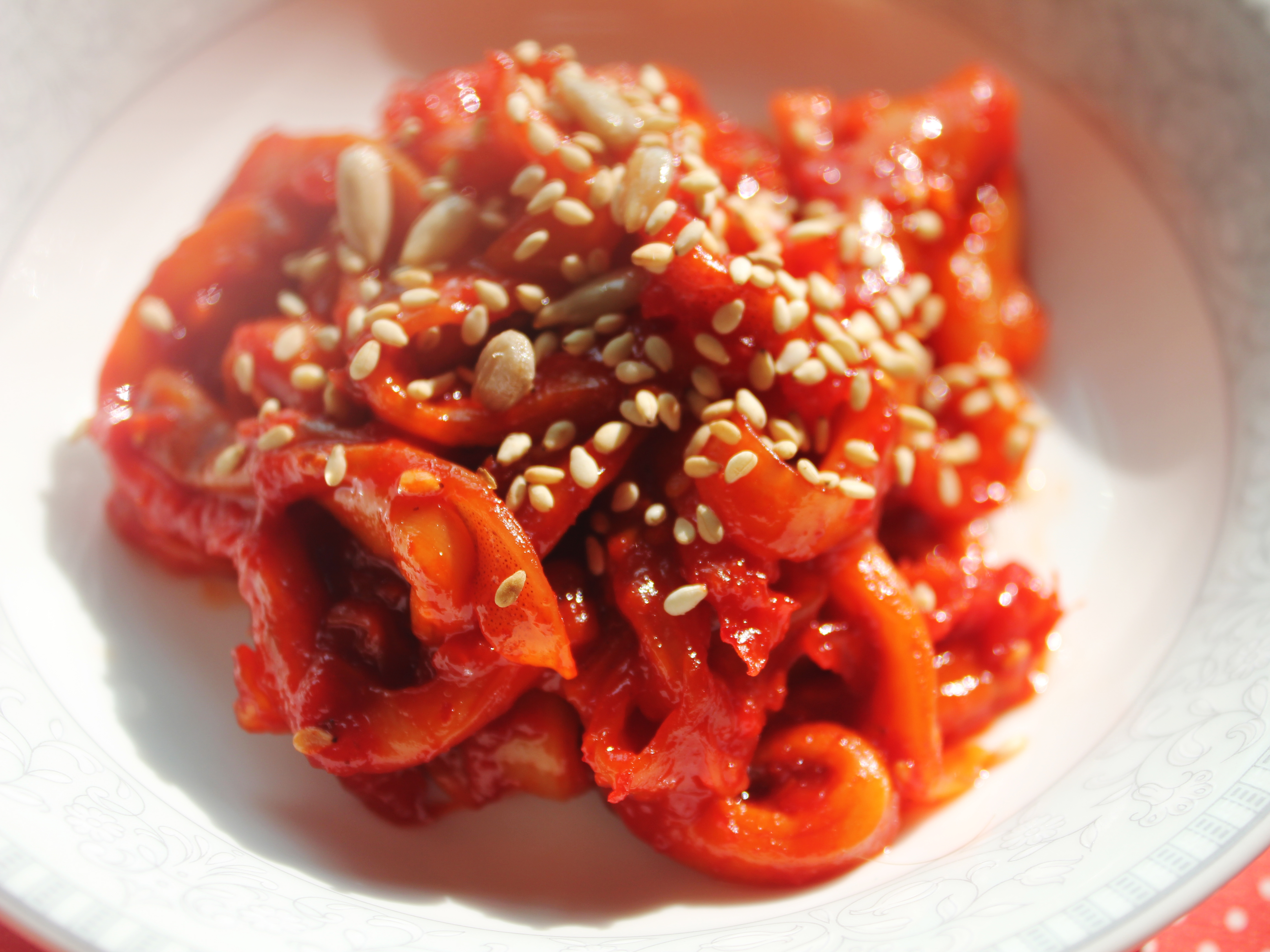
- Ojingeo-jeot served with toasted sesame seeds and pine nuts sprinkled on top
- Alternative names: Salted squid
- Type: Jeotgal
- Place of origin: Korea
- Associated cuisine: Korean cuisine
- Serving temperature: 4–10 °C (39–50 °F)
- Food energy (per 20 serving): 20 kcal (84 kJ)

Korean name
- Hangul: 오징어젓
- RR: ojingeojeot
- MR: ojingŏjŏt
- IPA: [o.dʑiŋ.ʌ.dʑʌt̚]

Ojingeo-jeot (Korean: 오징어젓) or salted squid is a jeotgal (salted seafood) made by salting and fermenting thinly sliced squid. It is a popular banchan (side dish) with high protein, vitamin and mineral contents.

== Preparation ==
Squid is skinned, gutted, washed, salted with coarse salt and let ferment for three to four days. It is then drained, salted again, and let age for three more days up to a month. Well fermented squid is washed, julienned into thin strips, and seasoned with gochutgaru (chili powder), mullyeot (rice syrup), aekjeot (fish sauce), chopped scallions, minced garlic, ground ginger, sliced chili peppers, toasted sesame seeds, and sesame oil.

== Varieties ==
In Jeju Island, mitre squid is used. As the squid is called hanchi (한치) or hanchi-ojingeo (한치오징어), the mitre squid jeotgal can also be called hanchi-jeot (한치젓) or hanchi-ojingeo-jeot (한치오징어젓).

In Japan, salted seafood category similar to jeotgal is called shiokara. Salted and fermented squid dish similar to ojingeo-jeot is called ika-no-shiokara (イカの塩辛) in Japanese.

== See also ==
- Cantonese salted fish
- Cured fish
- Salted fish
- Salted squid
