= Salted squid =

Type of preserved seafood

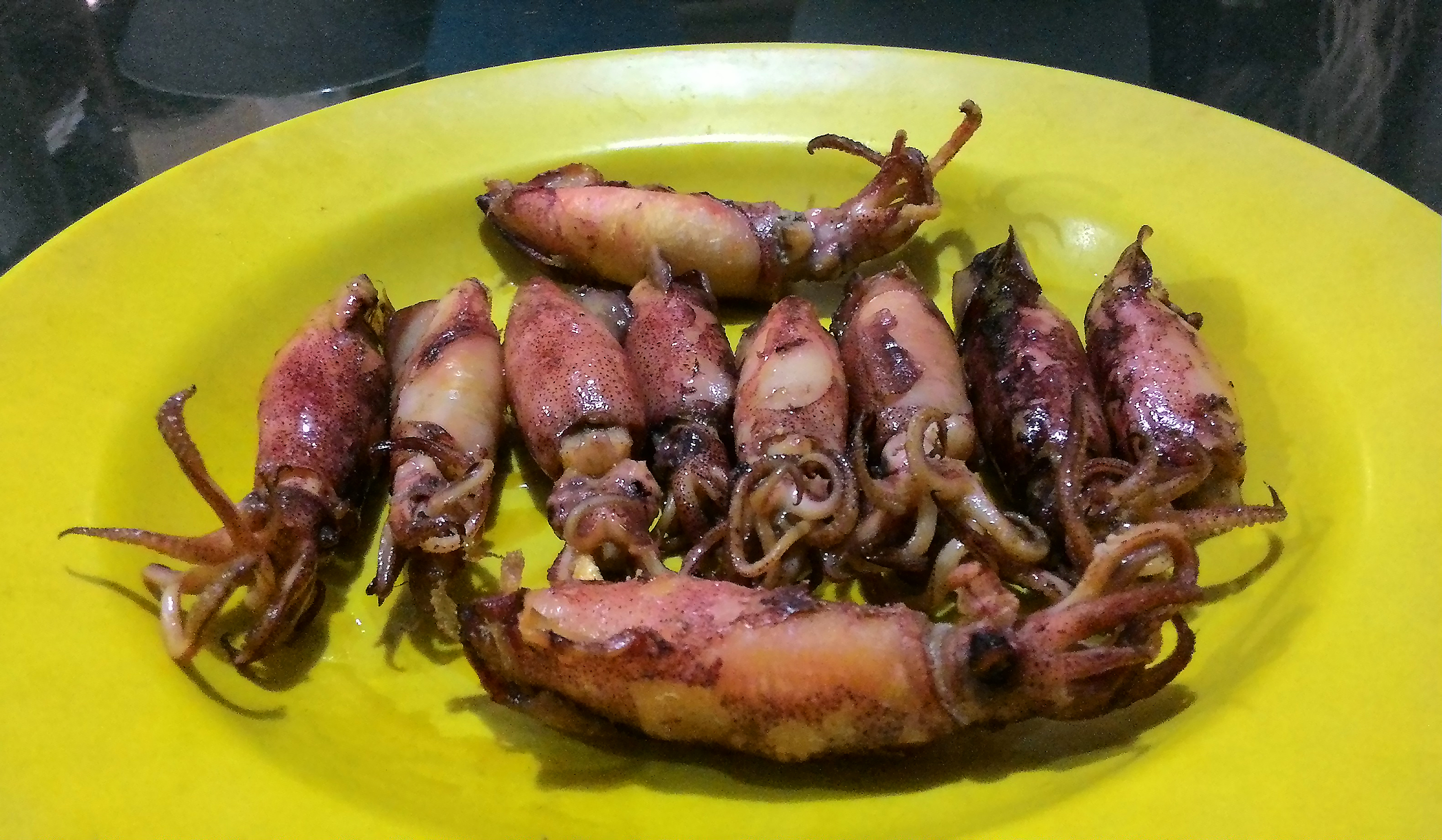
Cumi asin, Indonesian salted squid.

Salted squid is squid or cuttlefish cured with dry salt and thus preserved for later consumption. Drying or salting, either with dry salt or with brine is a widely available method of seafood preservation. Salted squid is often mistaken with dried shredded squid, which is specifically shredded and seasoned dried squid. The salted squid production method is similar to salted fish and often considered as a specific variant of salted fish. Salted squid is commonly found in coastal Asian countries, especially Indonesia, Malaysia, Thailand, Vietnam, Taiwan, Hong Kong, Southern China, South Korea and Japan.

== Method ==
The squid meat is washed with dilute brine or seawater to wash off contaminants on the surface. Draining is followed by salting. The salting process can be done in wet method — by soaking squids in brine solution, or in dry salting — by sprinkling salt upon squids. The process is followed by sun drying. In East Asian countries, such as Japan and China, dried salted squid are usually gutted and flattened prior to sun drying. In Indonesia however, dried salted squid are usually not gutted and remain in its cylindric form.

== In cuisine ==
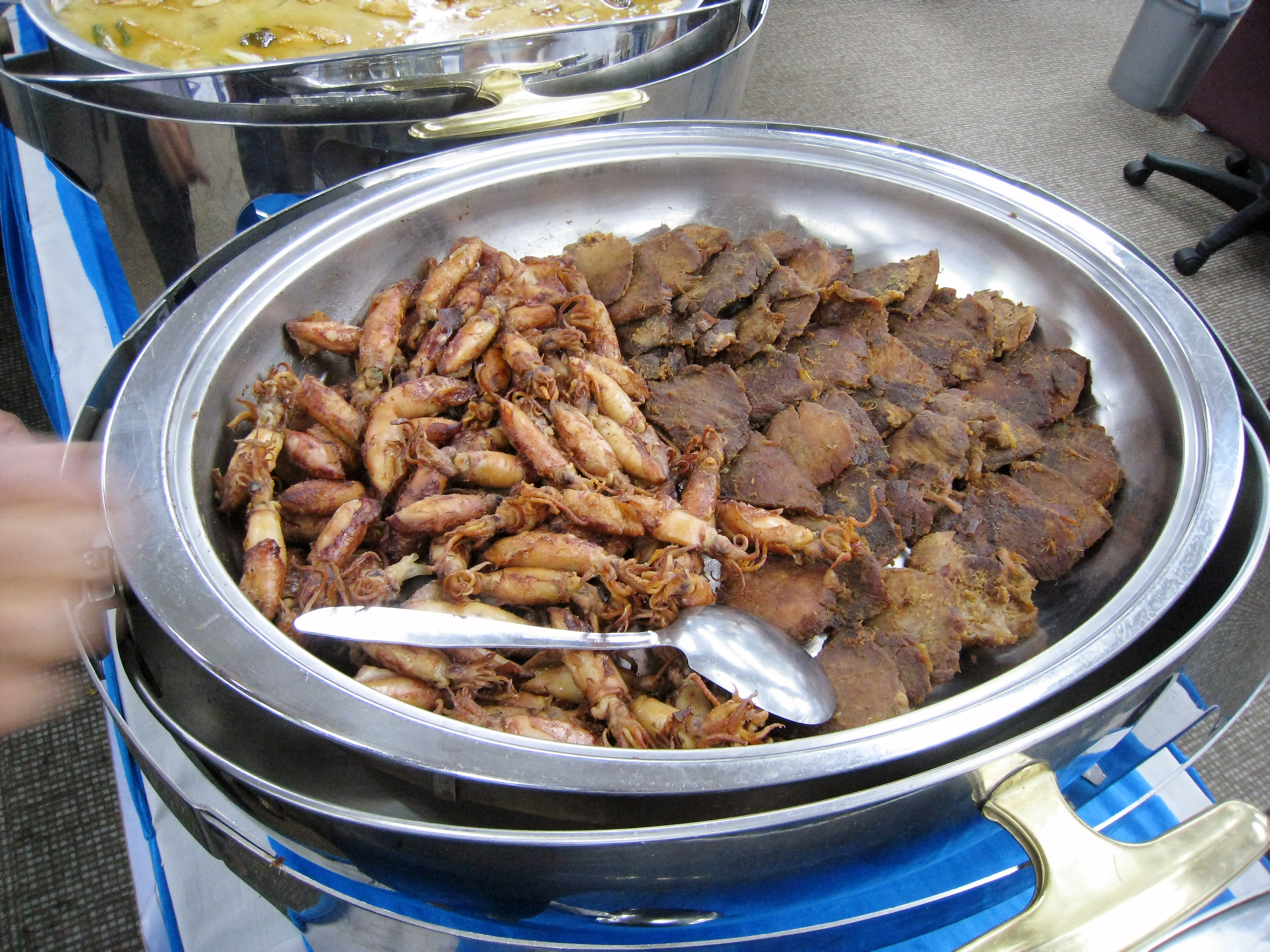
Salted squid as part of prasmanan buffet.

In Indonesia, dried salted squid is one of the popular processed seafoods available in traditional markets. Usually salted dried squid are washed and fried, either deep fried or stir fried, and consumed as a side dish with steamed rice. Stir fried cuttlefish might be cooked in green sambal chili paste.

== See also ==
- Brining
- Cantonese salted fish
- Cured fish
- Ojingeo-jeot
- Squid as food
