= Jeotgal =

Korean salted seafood category

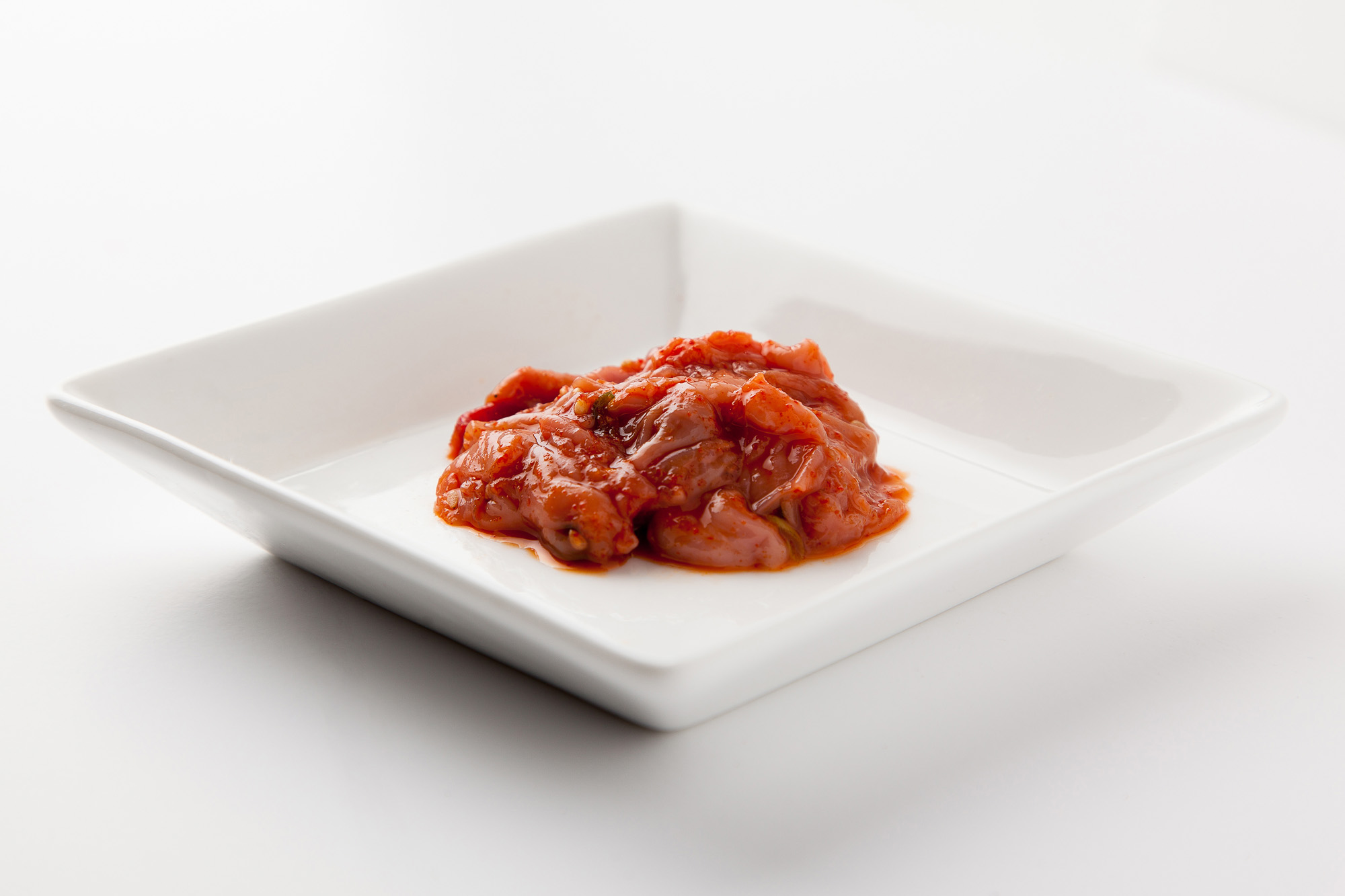
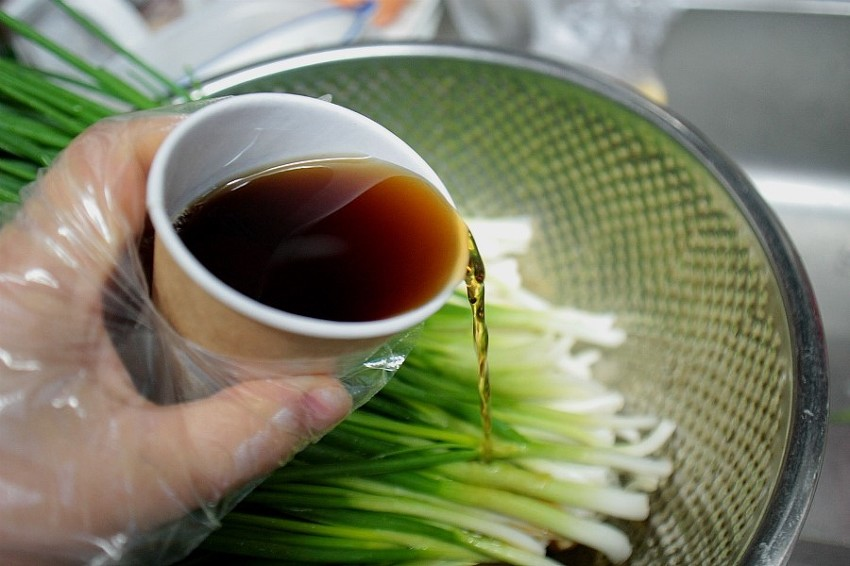
- Upper: changnan-jeot (salted pollock tripe); Lower: pouring aekjeot (liquid jeot) on scallions
- Alternative names: Jeot, salted seafood
- Course: Banchan
- Place of origin: Korea
- Associated cuisine: Korean cuisine
- Main ingredients: Seafood, salt
- Similar dishes: Shiokara

Korean name
- Hangul: 젓; 젓갈
- RR: jeot; jeotgal
- MR: chŏt; chŏtkal
- IPA: [tɕʌt̚]; [tɕʌt̚.k͈al]

Liquid jeotgal
- Hangul: 액젓
- Hanja: 液젓
- RR: aekjeot
- MR: aekchŏt
- IPA: [ɛk̚.tɕʌt̚]

Jeotgal (Korean: 젓갈) or jeot (젓), translated as salted seafood, is a category of salted preserved dishes made with seafood such as shrimps, oysters, clams, fish, and roe. Depending on the ingredients, jeotgal can range from flabby or solid pieces to clear, broth-like liquid.

Solid jeotgal are usually eaten as banchan (side dishes). Liquid jeotgal, called aekjeot (액젓) or fish sauce, is popularly used in kimchi seasoning, as well as in various soups and stews (guk, jijimi, jjigae). As a condiment, jeotgal with smaller bits of solid ingredients such as saeu-jeot (shrimp jeotgal) is commonly served as a dipping sauce with pork dishes (bossam, jokbal, samgyeopsal), sundae (Korean sausage), hoe (raw fish), and a number of soups and stews.

== History ==
Fermented foods were widely available in Three Kingdoms of Korea, as Sānguózhì, a Jin Chinese historical text published in 289, mentions that the Goguryeo Koreans are skilled in making fermented foods such as wine, soybean paste and salted and fermented fish in the section titled Dongyi in the Book of Wei. The first Korean record of jeotgal appeared in the historical text Samguk sagi, with a reference that King Sinmun offered rice, wine, jerky, and jeotgal as wedding presents in 683. In 1124, a Song Chinese envoy wrote that jeotgal was enjoyed by high and low alike in Goryeo. Twenty-four types of jeotgal appear in Miam ilgi (眉巖日記), a 16th-century diary written by a 16th century Joseon literatus Yu Hŭich'un, and over 180 types of jeotgal can be found in the coeval books Gosa chwaryo (고사촬요; 攷事撮要) and Swaemirok (쇄미록; 瑣尾錄), and in 17‒18th century books Ŭmsik timibang, Sallim kyŏngje, and Chŭngbo sallim kyŏngje.

== Types ==
The types of jeotgal vary depending on main ingredients, regions, and family and personal preferences. In past times, due to the limited availability of transportation, regions near seas had more types of jeot compared to the inland areas.

=== Fish (fish innards and roe) ===
- Baendaengi-jeot (밴댕이젓) – salted sardinella
- Baengeo-jeot (뱅어젓) – salted baby Chirolophis japonicus (East Asian prickleback)
- Biut-jeot (비웃젓) – salted herring
- Bolak-jeot (볼락젓) – salted rockfish
- Byeongeo-jeot (병어젓) – salted silver pomfret
- Changnan-jeot (창난젓) – salted pollock innards
- Cheongeo-al-jeot (청어알젓) – salted herring roe
- Daegu-al-jeot (대구알젓) – salted cod roe
- Daegu-iri-jeot (대구이리젓) – salted cod milt
- Daechang-jeot (대창젓) – salted cod innards
- Domi-jeot (도미젓) – salted sea bream
- Dorumuk-jeot (도루묵젓) – salted sandfish
- Euneo-al-jeot (은어알젓) – salted sweetfish roe
- Gajami-jeot (가자미젓) – salted righteye flounder
- Galchi-jeot (갈치젓) – salted hairtail
- Galchi-sok-jeot (갈치속젓) – salted hairtail innards
- Gangdari-jeot (강달이젓) – salted Collichthys niveatus (bighead croaker species under the family Sciaenidae)
- Godeungeo-naejang-jeot (고등어내장젓젓) – salted chub mackerel innards
- Goji-jeot (고지젓) – salted pollock milt
- Gwangeo-jeot (광어젓) – salted olive flounder roe
- Ingeo-jeot (잉어젓) – salted carp
- Jangjae -jeot (장재젓) – salted cod gill
- Jari-jeot (자리젓) – salted pearl-spot chromis
- Jeoneo-bam-jeot (전어밤젓) – salted gizzard shad tripe
- Jeoneo-jeot (전어젓) – salted gizzard shad
- Jeongeori-jeot (정어리젓) – salted sardine
- Jogi-agami-jeot (조기아가미젓) – salted yellow croaker gill
- Jogi-al-jeot (조기알젓) – salted yellow croaker roe
- Jogi-jeot (조기젓) – salted yellow croaker
- Junchi-jeot (준치젓) – salted ilisha
- Kkanari-jeot (까나리젓) – salted sand lance
- kkongchi-jeot (꽁치젓) – salted saury
- Maegari-jeot (매가리젓) – salted jack mackerel
- Myeolchi-jeot (멸치젓) – salted anchovy
- Myeongnan-jeot (명란젓) – salted pollock roe
- Myeongtae-agami-jeot (명태아가미젓젓) – salted pollock gill
- Nansa-jeot (난사젓) – salted baby sandlance
- Neungseongeo-jeot (능성어젓) – salted grouper
- Obunjagi-jeot (오분자기젓) – salted baby abalone
- Sokjeot (속젓) – salted yellow croaker innards
- Sungeo-al-jeot (숭어알젓) – salted mullet roe
- Taean-jeot (태안젓) – salted pollock eye
- Ttora-jeot (또라젓) – salted mullet innards
- Ungeo-jeot (웅어젓) – salted grenadier anchovy
- Yeoneo-al-jeot (연어알젓) – salted salmon roe
- Yeopsak-jeot (엽삭젓) – salted gizzard shad tripe

=== Shellfish and other marine animals ===
- Bajirak-jeot (바지락젓) – salted Manila clam
- Bangge-jeot (방게젓) – salted thoracotrematan crab
- Daeha-jeot (대하젓) – salted fleshy prawn
- Daehap-jeot (대합젓) – salted oriental clam
- Dongjuk-jeot (동죽젓) – salted astarte
- Gaetgajae-jeot (갯가재젓) – salted mantis shrimp
- Ge-al-jeot (게알젓) – salted crab roe
- Gejang (게장) – salted crab
- Geut-jeot (게웃젓) – salted abalone innards
- Gonjaengi-jeot (곤쟁이젓) – salted mysid shrimp
- Guljeot (굴젓) – salted oyster
- Haesam-chang-jeot (해삼창젓) – salted sea cucumber innards
- Haesam-jeot (해삼젓) – salted sea cucumber
- Hanchi-jeot (한치젓) – salted mitre squid
- Haran-jeot (하란젓) – salted shrimp roe
- Honghap-jeot (홍합젓) – salted mussel
- Jeonbok-jeot (전복젓) – salted abalone
- Jogae-jeot (조개젓) – salted clam
- Kkolttugi-jeot (꼴뚜기젓) – salted baby squid
- Kkotge-jeot (꽃게젓) – salted blue crab
- Matjeot (맛젓) – salted razor clam
- Meongge-jeot (멍게젓) – salted sea pineapple
- Mosijogae-jeot (모시조개젓) – salted venus clam
- Nakji-jeot (낙지젓) – salted octopus
- Ojingeo-jeot (오징어젓) – salted squid
- Pijogae-jeot (피조개젓) – salted blood clam
- Saengi-jeot (생이젓) – salted freshwater shrimp
- Saeu-jeot (새우젓) – salted shrimp
- Seha-jeot (세하젓) – salted glass shrimp
- Seongge-al-jeot (성게알젓) – salted sea urchin roe
- Seongge-jeot (성게젓) – salted sea urchin
- Sora-jeot (소라젓) – salted horned turban
- Tohwa-jeot (토화젓) – salted estuarine oyster

== Gallery ==
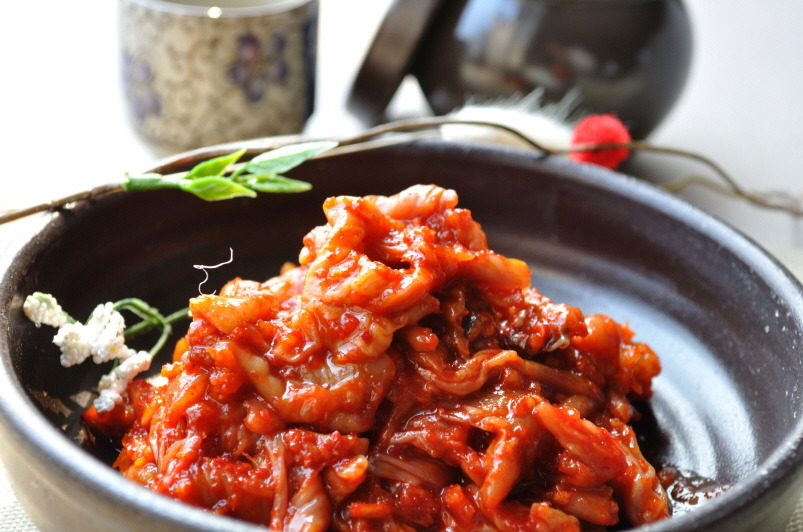
changnan-jeot (salted pollock innards)

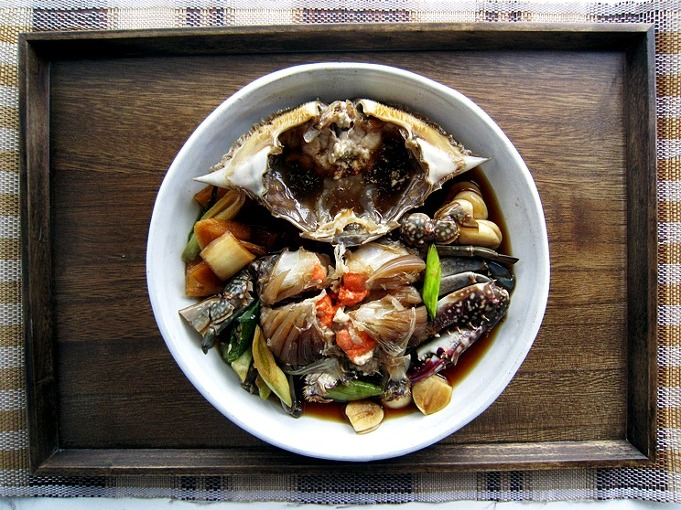
ganjang-gejang (marinated crab)

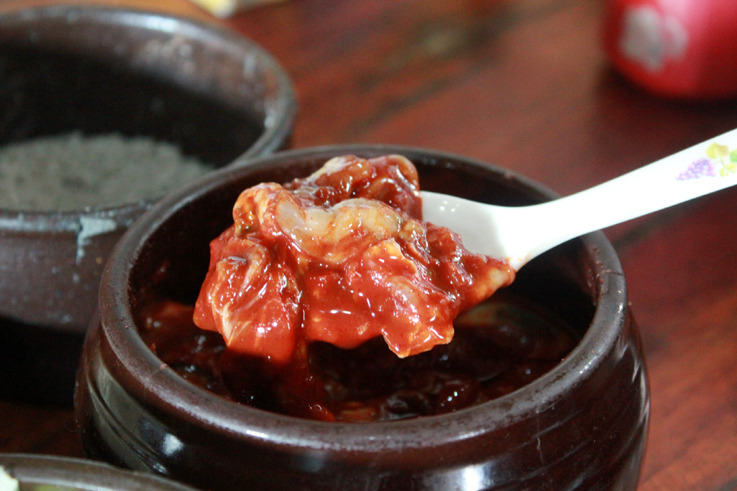
guljeot (salted oyster)

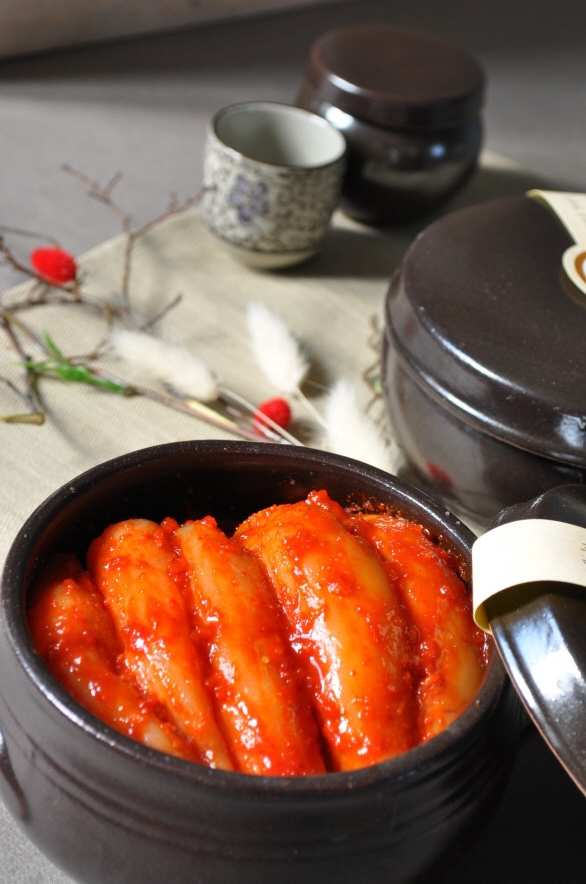
myeongnan-jeot (salted pollock roe)

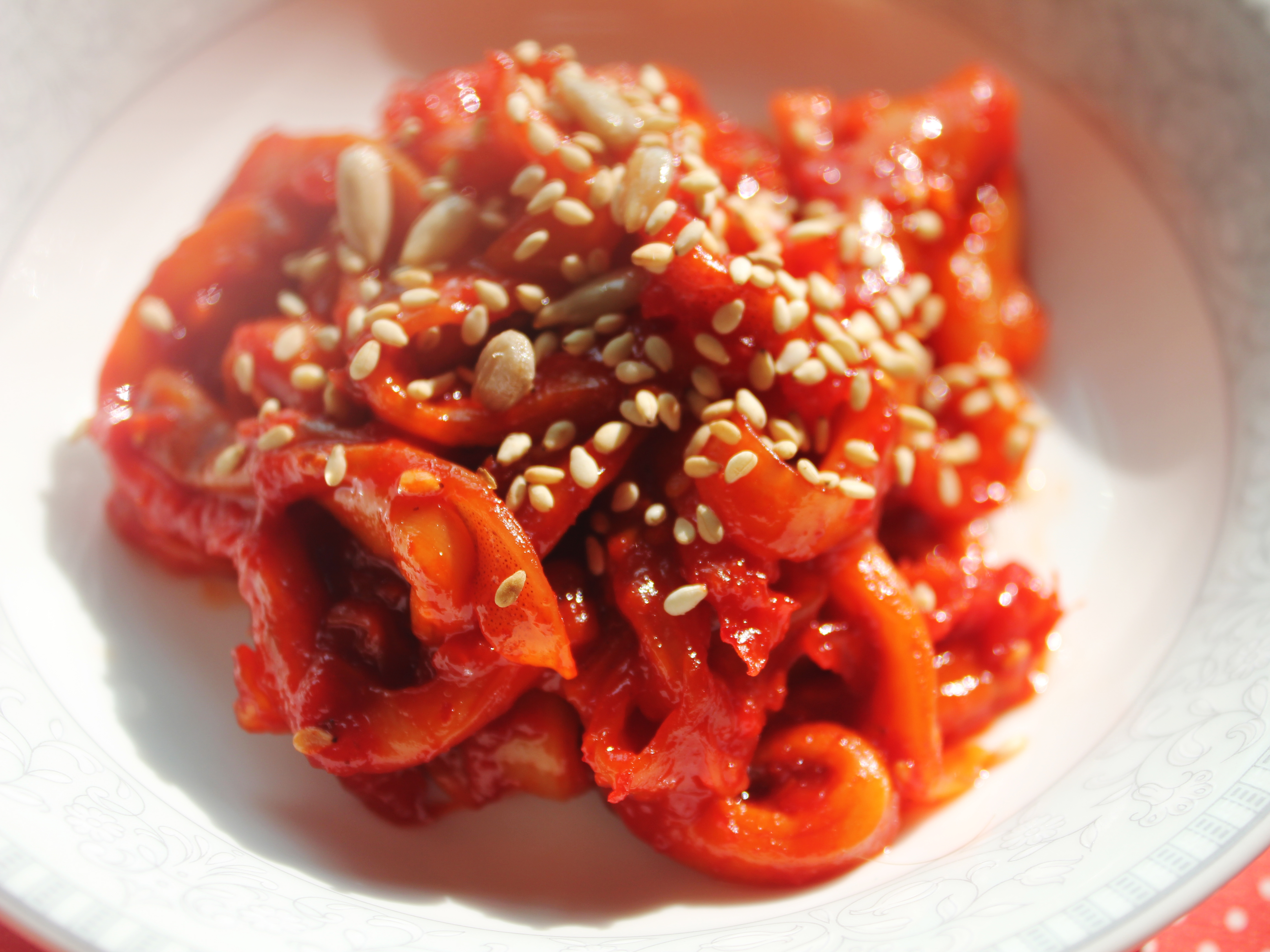
ojingeo-jeot (salted squid)

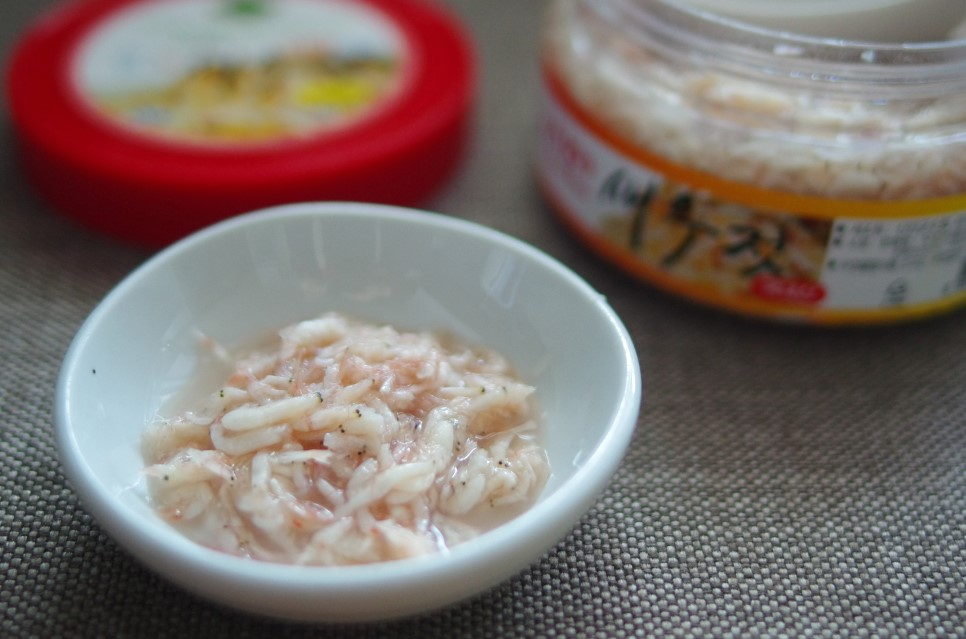
saeu-jeot (salted shrimp)

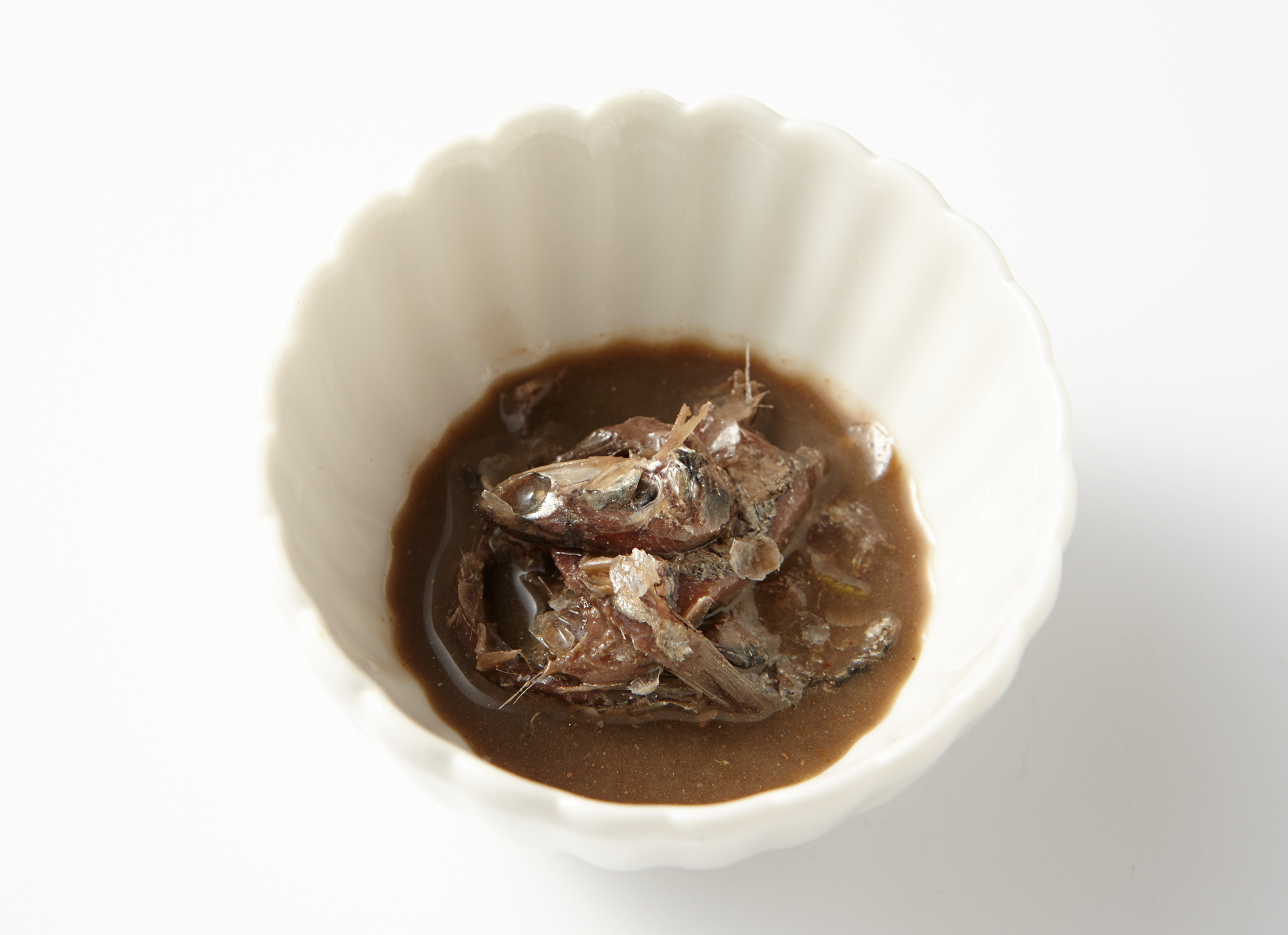
myeolchi-jeot (salted anchovy)

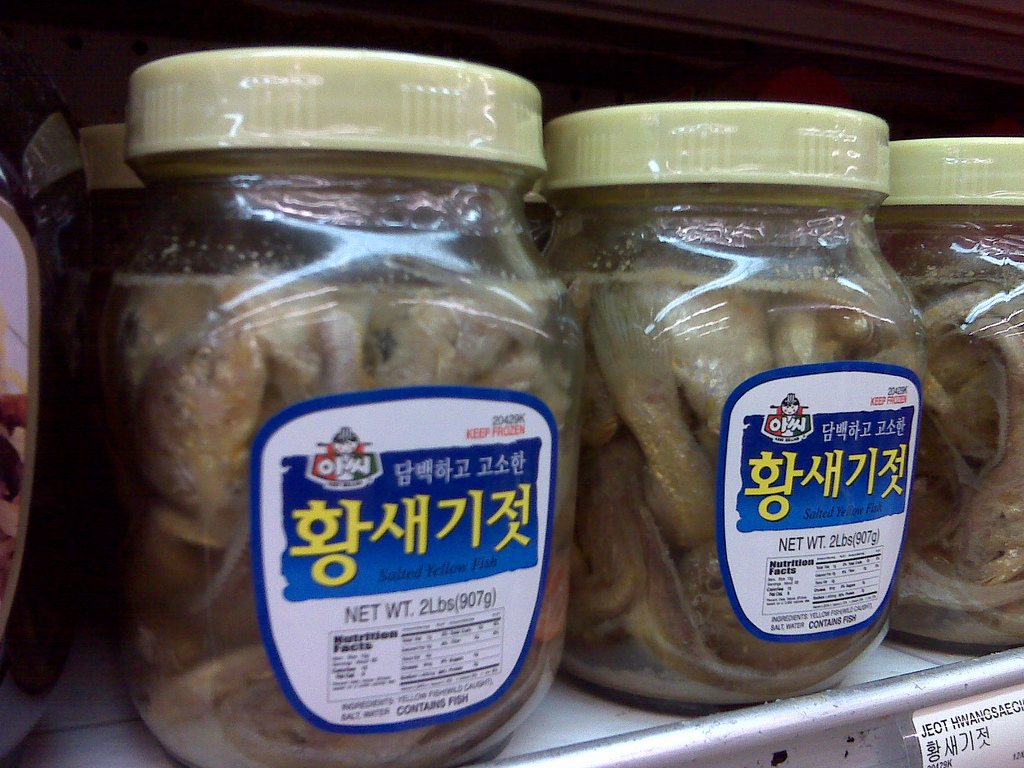
jogi-jeot (salted yellow croaker)

== See also ==
- Sikhae – Salted fermented fish in Korean cuisine
- Shiokara – Japanese snack made of salty seafood
