= Jogi-jeot =

Korean yellow croaker dish

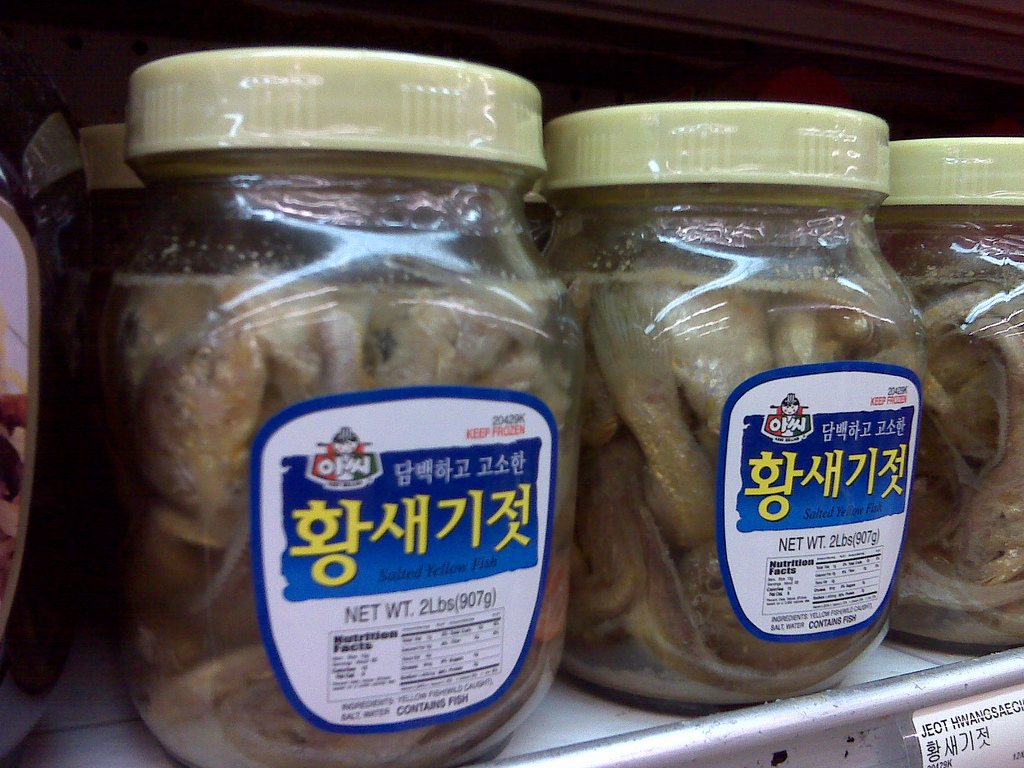
- Alternative names: Salted yellow croaker
- Type: Jeotgal
- Place of origin: Korea
- Main ingredients: Yellow croaker

Korean name
- Hangul: 조기젓
- RR: jogijeot
- MR: chogijŏt
- IPA: [tɕo.ɡi.dʑʌt̚]

Jogi-jeot (Korean: 조기젓) or salted yellow croaker is a variety of jeotgal (salted seafood), made with yellow croakers. In Korean cuisine, jogi-jeot is widely used as banchan (side dish), as a condiment, or as an ingredient for kimchi.

== History ==
Korean people have eaten yellow croakers for a very long time, as Shuowen Jiezi, an early 2nd-century Chinese dictionary, reports that yellow croakers were caught in Lelang, and that a Han commandery existed within the Korean peninsula.

== Preparation ==
Fresh yellow croakers, with lustrous scales and a chubby belly, caught in May to June. are preferred. Croakers are washed and drained on sokuri (bamboo tray), then stuffed with coarse salt, and laid on a salt-lined onggi (earthenware jar). One layer of fish is followed by one layer of salt, and so on. When the jar is around 70% filled, split and sterilized bamboo stalks are laid over the croakers, followed by boiled and cooled brine (mixture of 2/3 water and 1/3 salt). In total, the salt used should weigh around 15‒20% of the fish. The jeotgal is left to ferment at 15–20 °C (59–68 °F) for two to three months and up to a year.

== See also ==
- Myeolchi-jeot
- Myeongnan-jeot
- Saeu-jeot
