= Sikhae =

Salted fermented fish in Korean cuisine

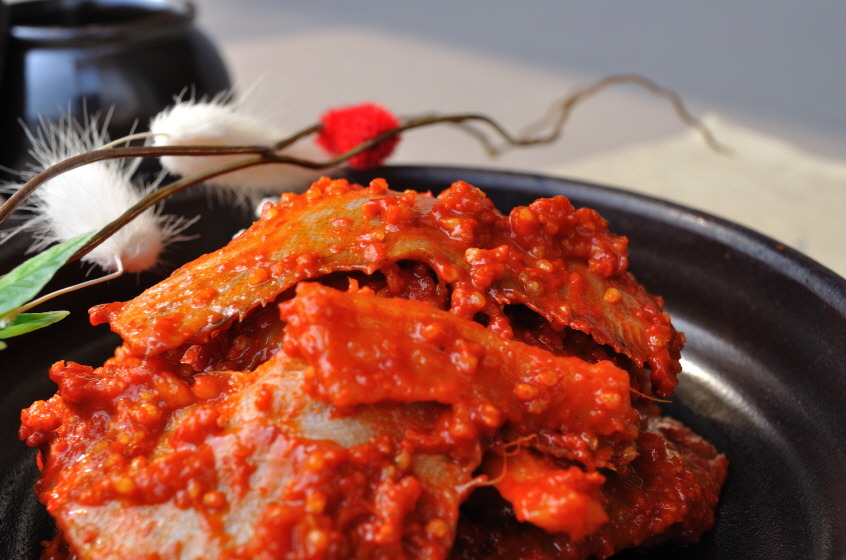
- Gajami-sikhae (fermented righteye flounders)
- Course: Banchan
- Place of origin: Korea
- Associated cuisine: Korean cuisine
- Similar dishes: Jeotgal

Korean name
- Hangul: 식해
- Hanja: 食醢
- RR: sikhae
- MR: sikhae

Sikhae (Korean: 식해; Hanja: 食醢) is a salted fermented food in Korean cuisine prepared with fish and grains. Sikhae is made in the east coast regions of Korea, namely Gwanbuk, Gwandong, and Yeongnam.

== Ingredients and preparation ==
Righteye flounders are typically used for sikhae. Other commonly used fish include Alaska pollock, chub mackerel, sailfin sandfish, and Japanese anchovy. Sometimes, dried fish such as bugeo (dried Alaska pollock) may also be used to make sikhae.

Grain-wise, cooked foxtail millet is used in the Gwanbuk region, while cooked rice is used in other regions. Sometimes, millet, quinoa, or other grains may also be used.

For salting, coarse sea salt is used. Other ingredients include chili powder, garlic, and ginger.

=== Gajami-sikhae ===
The Hamgyŏng Province is famous for its gajami-sikhae (fermented flounder). Righteye flounders—preferably yellow-striped ones harvested during December to early March— are washed, drained, and salted with coarse sea salt for about ten days. The salted fish are then rinsed, cut into bite-size pieces, mixed with cooked foxtail millet and chili powder, and allowed to age. After four days, thickly julienned and salted radish slices mixed with chili powder are added, and the sikhae can be eaten after another ten days of aging.

== See also ==
- Jeotgal
- Fermented fish
- List of fermented foods
