= Guljeot =

Korean salted oyster side dish

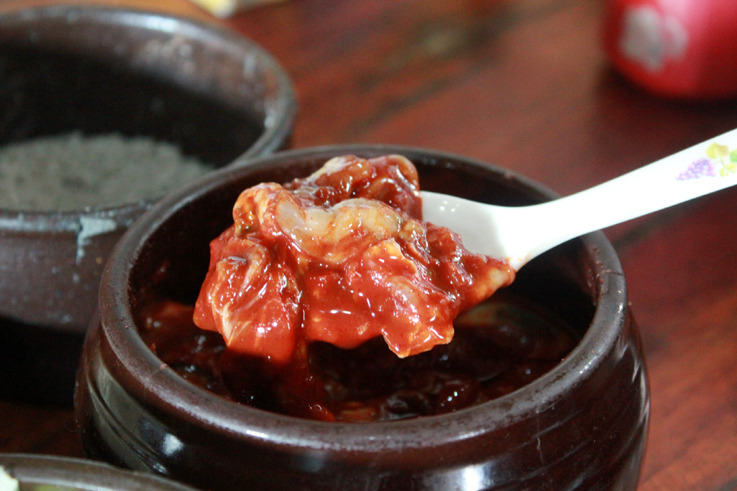
- Alternative names: Salted oyster
- Type: Jeotgal
- Place of origin: Korea
- Associated cuisine: Korean cuisine

Korean name
- Hangul: 굴젓
- RR: guljeot
- MR: kuljŏt
- IPA: [kul.dʑʌt̚]

Guljeot (Korean: 굴젓) or salted oyster is a jeotgal (salted seafood) made by salting and fermenting oyster. It is a popular banchan (side dish) served as an accompaniment to bap (cooked rice).

== Preparation ==
Small, fresh oysters are shucked, washed gently in salt water, salted with coarse salt, and allowed to ferment for five days. It is then seasoned with minced garlic, finely chopped onion, gochutgaru (chili powder), and optionally julienned radish and/or pear. It is then aged for three to four days, and is served with a drizzle of sesame oil.

== Gallery ==
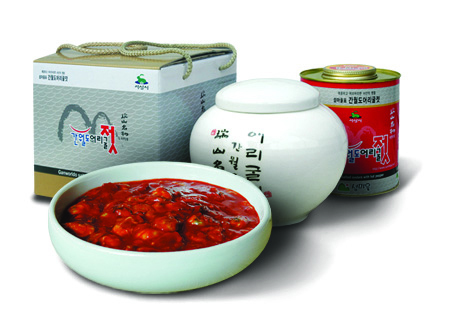
Eori-guljeot
