= Cured fish =

Fish subjected to fermentation, pickling or smoking

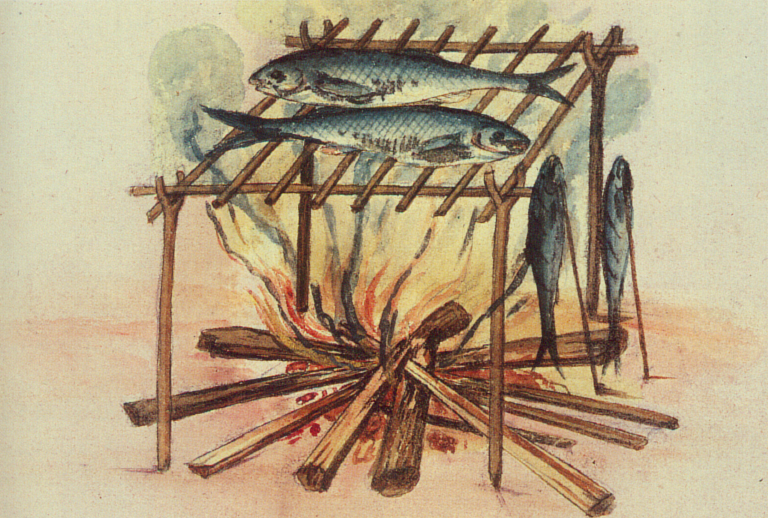
Equipment for curing fish used by the North Carolina Algonquins, 1585

Cured fish is fish which has been cured by subjecting it to fermentation, pickling, smoking, or some combination of these before it is eaten. These food preservation processes can include adding salt, nitrates, nitrite or sugar, can involve smoking and flavoring the fish, and may include cooking it. The earliest form of curing fish was dehydration. Other methods, such as smoking fish or salt-curing also go back for thousands of years. The term "cure" is derived from the Latin curare, meaning to take care of. It was first recorded in reference to fish in 1743.

== History ==
Salt is "the oldest and best known of preserving agents... its chief action appears to be due to its power of attracting moisture, and thus extracting fluid to harden the tissues"

— Edward Smith, 1873

According to Binkerd and Kolari (1975), the practice of preserving meat by salting it originated in Asian deserts. "Saline salts from this area contained impurities such as nitrates that contributed to the characteristic red colour of cured meats. As early as 3,000 BC in Mesopotamia, cooked meats and fish were preserved in sesame oil and dried salted meat and fish were part of the Sumerian diet. Salt from the Dead Sea was in use by Jewish inhabitants around 1,600 BC, and by 1,200 BC, the Phoenicians were trading salted fish in the Eastern Mediterranean region. By 900 BC, salt was being produced in "salt gardens" in Greece and dry salt curing and smoking of meat were well established. The Romans (200 BC) acquired curing procedures from the Greeks and further developed methods to "pickle" various kinds of meats in a brine marinade. It was during this time that the reddening effect of salting was noted. Saltpeter (potassium nitrate) is mentioned as being gathered in China and India prior to the Christian era for use in meat curing... In medieval times, the application of salt and saltpeter as curing ingredients was commonplace and the reddening effect on meat was attributed to saltpeter."

== Salt curing ==
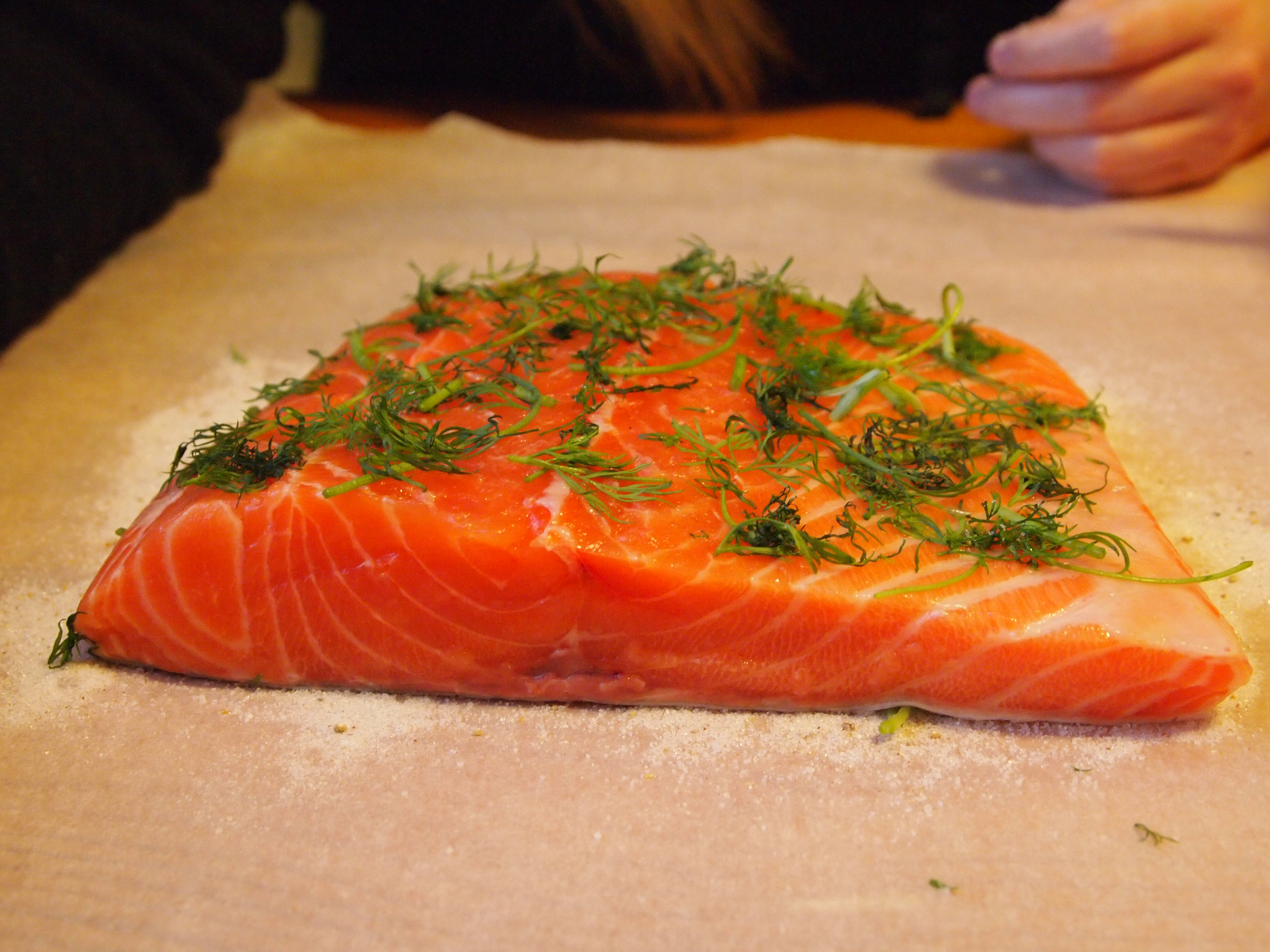
Salmon prepared for curing

Salt (sodium chloride) is a primary ingredient used to cure fish and other foods. Removal of water and addition of salt to fish creates a solute-rich environment where osmotic pressure draws water out of microorganisms, retarding their growth. Doing this requires a concentration of salt of nearly 20%. Iodized table salt may be used, but the iodine generally causes a dark end product and a bitter taste. Non-iodized salts like those used for canning and pickling foods and sea salt are the preferred types of salt to use for curing meats.

== Sugar curing ==
Sugar is sometimes added when curing fish, particularly salmon. The sugar can take many forms, including honey, corn syrup solids, and maple syrup. Adding sugar alleviates the harsh flavor of the salt. It also contributes to the growth of beneficial bacteria like Lactobacillus by feeding them.

== Nitrates and nitrites ==
Nitrates and nitrites have been used for hundreds of years to prevent botulism in fish and ensure microbial safety. Nitrates help kill bacteria, produce a characteristic flavor, and give fish a pink or red color. Nitrite is commonly used to speed up the curing of meat and also impart an attractive colour while having no effect on the growth of the Clostridium botulinum bacteria which causes botulism.

The use of nitrates in food preservation is controversial, and some traditional and artisanal producers avoid using them. This is due to the potential for the formation of nitrosamines when the preserved food is cooked at high temperature. However, the production of carcinogenic nitrosamines can be potently inhibited by the use of the antioxidants Vitamin C and the alpha-tocopherol form of Vitamin E during curing. A 2007 study by Columbia University suggests a link between eating cured meats and chronic obstructive pulmonary disease. Nitrites were posited as a possible cause. The use of either compound is carefully regulated. For example, the FDA Code of Federal Regulations states that sodium nitrite may be safely used: "As a color fixative in smoked cured tunafish products so that the level of sodium nitrite does not exceed 10 parts per million (0.001 percent) in the finished product... As a preservative and color fixative, with or without sodium nitrate, in smoked, cured sablefish, smoked, cured salmon, and smoked, cured shad so that the level of sodium nitrite does not exceed 200 parts per million and the level of sodium nitrate does not exceed 500 parts per million in the finished product."

== Smoking ==
Fish can also be preserved by smoking, which is drying the fish with smoke from burning or smoldering plant materials, usually wood. Smoking helps seal the outer layer of the food being cured, making it more difficult for bacteria to enter. It can be done in combination with other curing methods such as salting. Common smoking styles include hot smoking, smoke roasting and cold smoking. Smoke roasting and hot smoking cook the fish while cold smoking does not. If the fish is cold smoked, it should be dried quickly to limit bacterial growth during the critical period where the fish is not yet dry. This can be achieved by drying thin slices of fish.

== Cured fish dishes ==
=== Europe ===
- Arbroath smokie (Scotland) - Haddock salted, dried, and then smoked over hardwood.
- Bacalhau (Portugal and Spain) - cod cured in salt, then dried. It needs to be re-hydrated and de-salted before use.
- Bottarga (Mediterranean) - salted and cured fish roe.
- Dried cod (Norway and Italy) - Dried, fermented cod. The cod is soaked before use.
- Finnan haddie (Scotland) - Cold-smoked haddock.
- Gravlax (Nordics (countries)) - Raw salmon cured with sugar, salt, and spices.
- Hákarl (Iceland) - Greenland or basking shark which has been cured with a particular fermentation process and hung to dry.
- Kipper (United Kingdom, Ireland) - Whole herring or a small, oily fish, that has been split in a butterfly fashion from tail to head, gutted, salted or pickled, and cold-smoked over smouldering wood chips.
- Lakerda (Balkans, Middle East) - Bonito soaked in brine and salted then stored in olive oil.
- Lox (Europe) - Cured salmon fillet.
- Lutefisk (Nordic countries) - Dried whitefish that is prepared for eating by soaking in a lye solution for several days, soaking in plain water for several additional days to remove the lye, then cooked.
- Matjes (The Netherlands) or Soused herring (Eastern England) - Raw herring soaked in a mild preserving liquid. It can be raw herring in a mild vinegar pickle or Dutch brined herring.
- Pickled herring (Europe, especially Scandinavia, Poland, North Germany and the Baltic) - Herring cured with salt; then the salt is removed and the herring is brined in a vinegar, salt, and sugar solution with spices.
- Rollmops (Europe) - Pickled herring fillets rolled around sliced onion and cucumber.
- Smoked salmon (Denmark, Iceland, Norway, Sweden, England, Ireland and Scotland) - A preparation of salmon, typically a fillet that has been cured and then hot or cold smoked.
- Spekesild (Norway) - Atlantic herring soaked in brine.

=== Africa ===
- Bokkoms (South Africa) - Whole mullet salted and then dried.
- Ng'onda (Kenya) - Salted and sun dried fish.

=== East Asia ===
- Cantonese salted fish (China) - brined and sun-dried fish.
- Eoran (Korea) - fish roe marinated in soy sauce and then sun-dried.
- Gwamegi (Korea) - Herring hung to freeze and dry on winter and intermittently smoked by cooking fires.
- Karasumi (Japan) - salted and sun-dried mullet roe.
- Katsuobushi (Japan) - Skipjack tuna filleted, simmered, smoked, fermented, and then sun-dried; also known as "bonito flakes".
- Po (food) (Korea) - dried marine fish (especially Alaska pollock).

=== Southeast Asia ===
- Cakalang fufu (Indonesia) - Skipjack tuna gutted, cured in soda powder, salt, and spices, smoked, and then dried.
- Daing (Philippines) - General term for salted and sun-dried fish.
- Pudpod (Philippines) - Anchovies cleaned, boiled, mixed with salt and pounded into patties that are then smoked.
- Tinapa (Philippines) - Fish (usually blackfin scad or milkfish) soaked in brine and then smoked.

=== South America ===
- Ceviche (Peru) - Fish or shellfish marinated and cured in citrus and seasonings.

== See also ==
- Brining
- Charcuterie
- Curing salt
- List of dried foods
- List of smoked foods
- Pickling
- Pickling salt
- Salting (food)
