= Salted fish =

Fish preserved or cured with salt

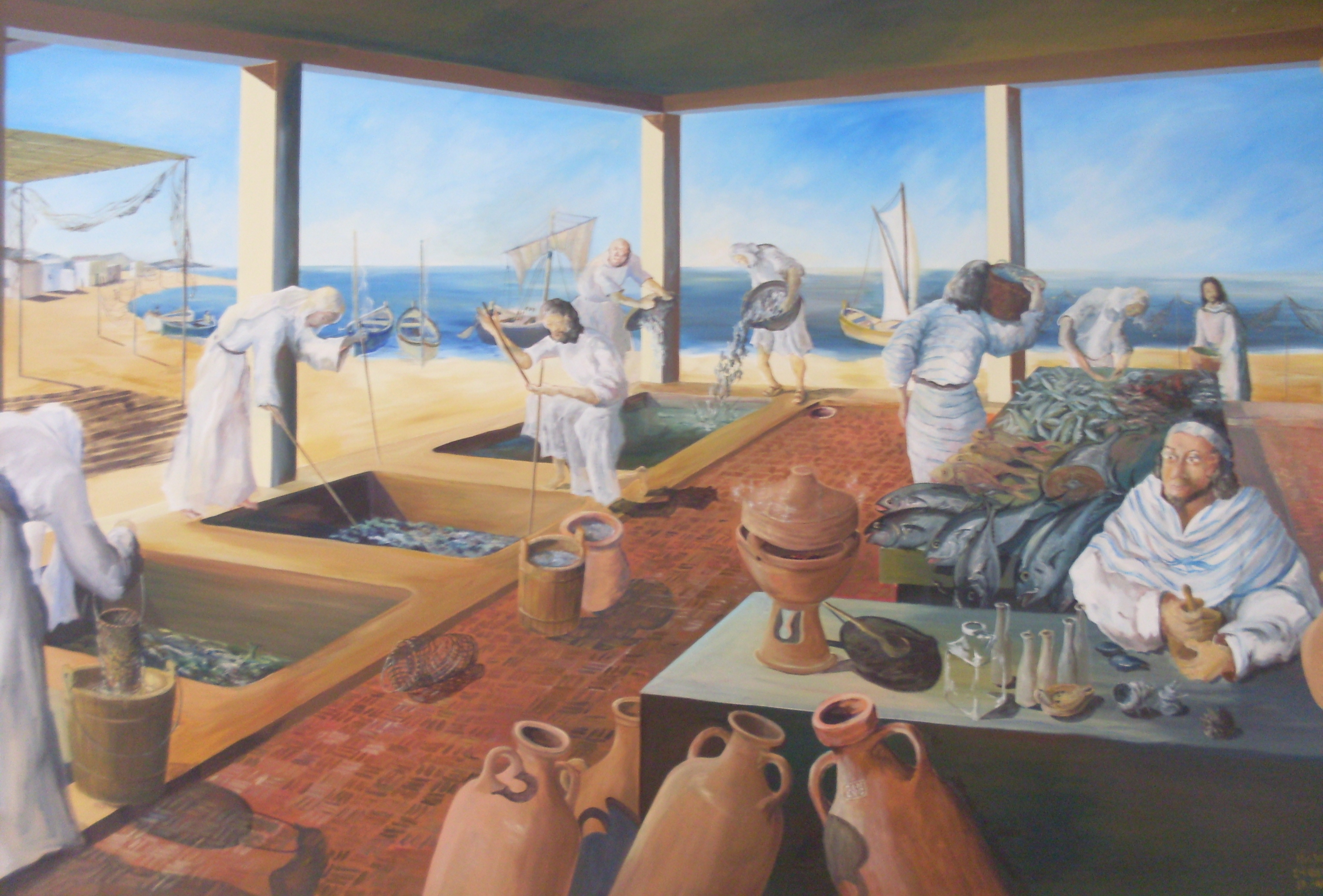
Reconstruction of the Roman fish-salting plant at Neapolis in present day Tunisia

Salted fish, such as kippered herring or dried and salted cod, is fish cured with dry salt and thus preserved for later eating. Drying or salting, either with dry salt or with brine, was the only widely available method of preserving fish until the 19th century. Dried fish and salted fish (or fish both dried and salted) are a staple of diets in the Azores, Caribbean, West Africa, North Africa, South Asia, Southeast Asia, the islands of Hawaii, Southern China, Scandinavia, parts of Canada including Newfoundland, coastal Russia, and in the Arctic. Like other salt-cured meats, it provides preserved animal protein even in the absence of refrigeration.

== Method ==
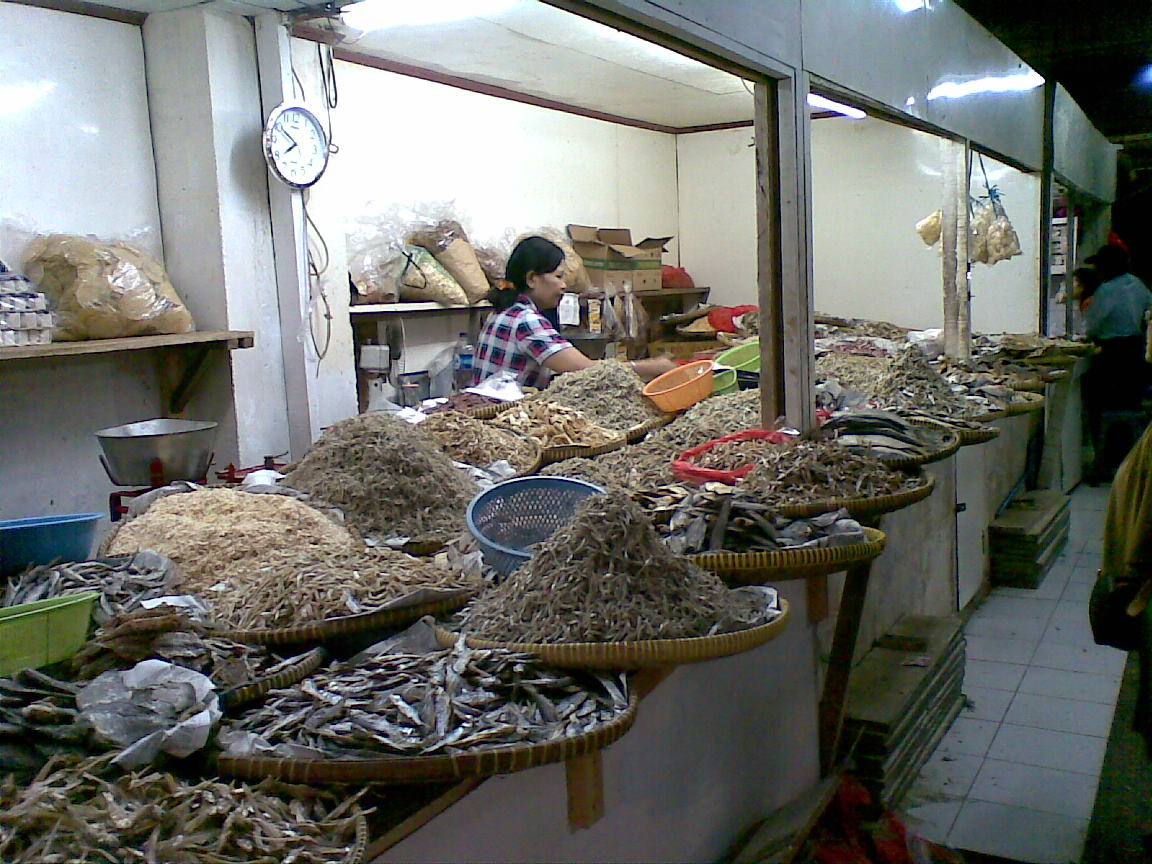
Various salted fish sold in a marketplace in a suburb of Jakarta, Indonesia

Salting is the preservation of food with dry edible salt. It is related to pickling (preparing food with brine, i.e. salty water), and is one of the oldest methods of preserving food. Salt inhibits the growth of microorganisms by drawing water out of microbial cells through osmosis. Concentrations of salt up to 20% are required to kill most species of unwanted bacteria. Smoking, often used in the process of curing meat, adds chemicals to the surface of meat that reduce the concentration of salt required. Salting is used because most bacteria, fungi and other potentially pathogenic organisms cannot survive in a highly salty environment, due to the hypertonic nature of salt. Any living cell in such an environment will become dehydrated through osmosis and die or become temporarily inactivated.

The water activity, a_{w}, in a fish is defined as the ratio of the water vapour pressure in the flesh of the fish to the vapour pressure of pure water at the same temperature and pressure. It ranges between 0 and 1, and is a parameter that measures how available the water is in the flesh of the fish. Available water is necessary for the microbial and enzymatic reactions involved in spoilage. There are a number of techniques that have been or are used to tie up the available water or remove it by reducing the a_{w}. Traditionally, techniques such as drying, salting and smoking have been used, and have been used for thousands of years. In more recent times, freeze-drying, water binding humectants, and fully automated equipment with temperature and humidity control have been added. Often a combination of these techniques is used.

== History ==
The practice of salting fish dates back to ancient times. In classical antiquity, the town of Magdala on the Sea of Galilee, located in present-day Israel, was also known by its Greek name, Taricheae, meaning "place of fish salting." The Greek geographer Strabo even praised the quality of its fish (Geographica 16.2.45).

== Health effects ==
Due to the elevated levels of nitrites, consuming salted fish increases risk of stomach cancer and nasopharyngeal cancer. The International Agency for Research on Cancer classify salted fish (Chinese-style) as a Group 1 carcinogen.

== Gallery ==
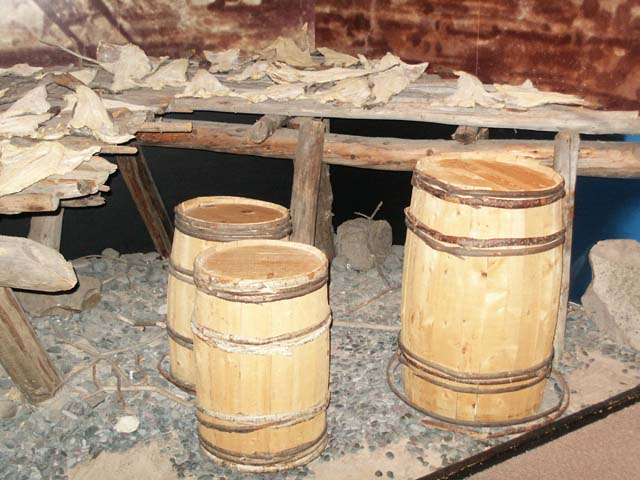
Platforms, called fish flakes, where cod dry in the sun before being packed in salt

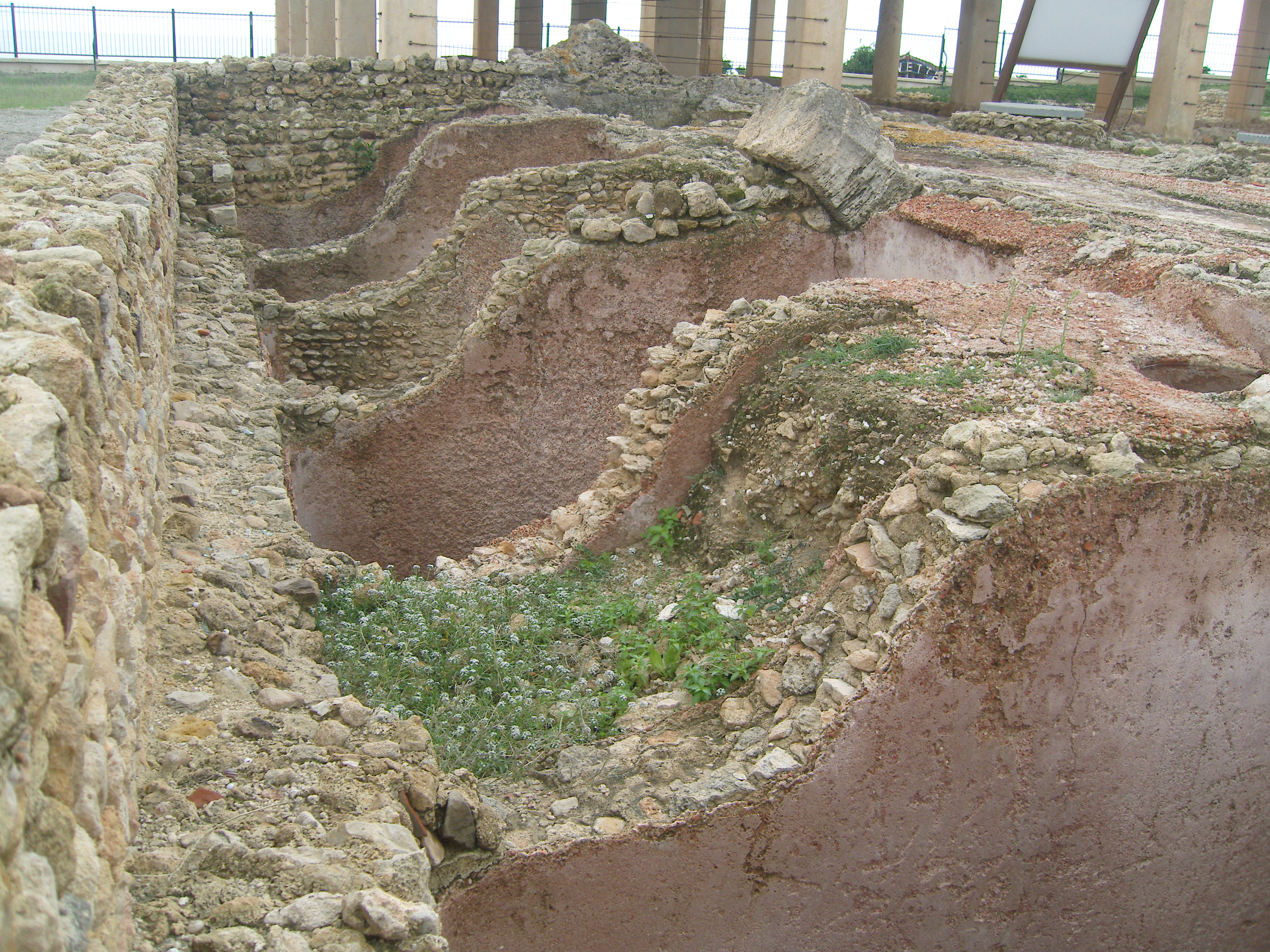
Remains of Roman fish-salting plant at Neapolis

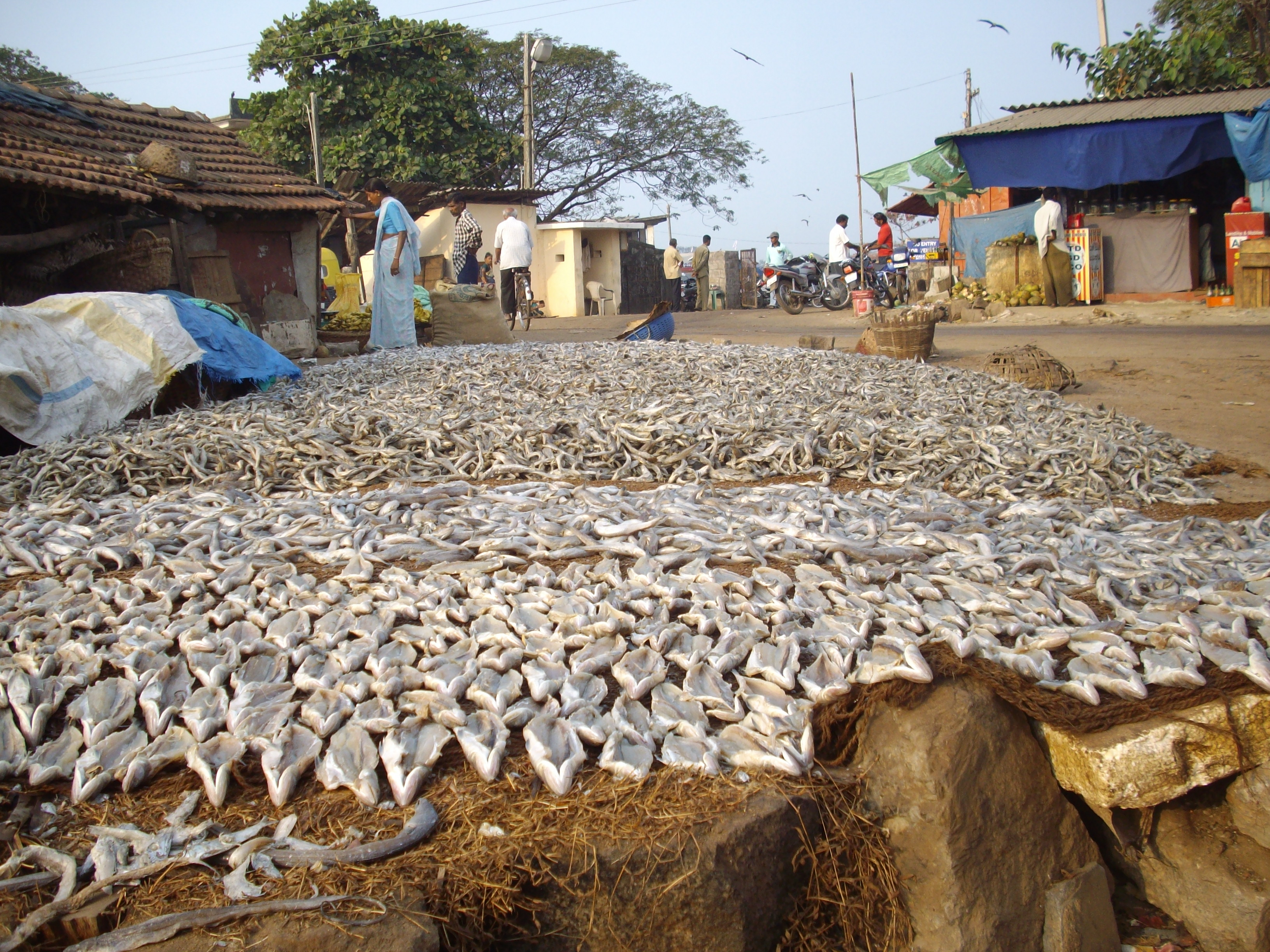
Drying salted fish at Malpe Harbour

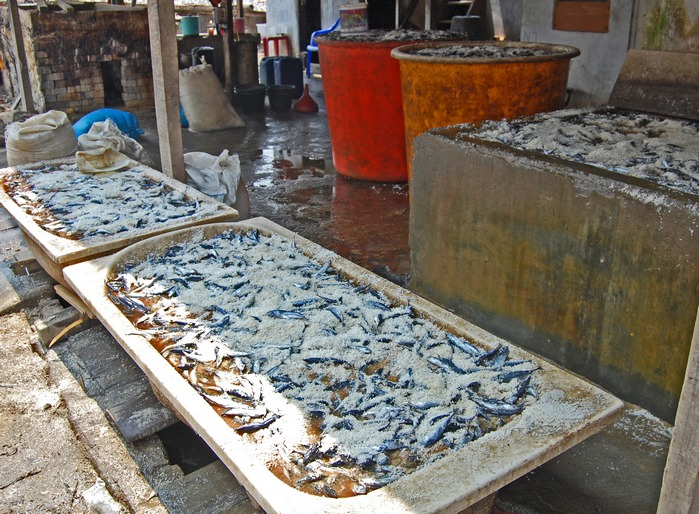
Salt fish dip at Jakarta

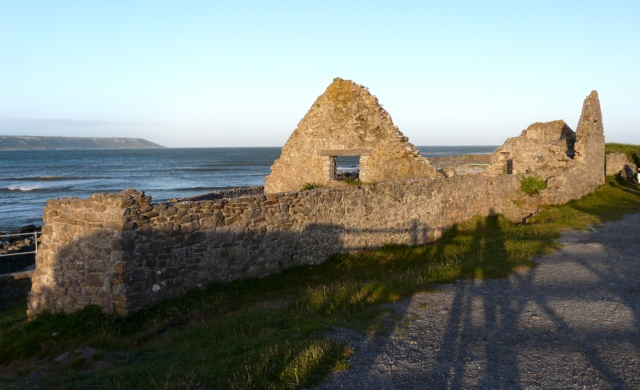
Ruins of the Port Eynon Salt House, where seawater was boiled to extract salt for preserving fish

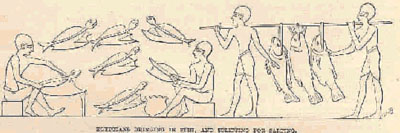
Egyptians bringing in fish and splitting them for salting

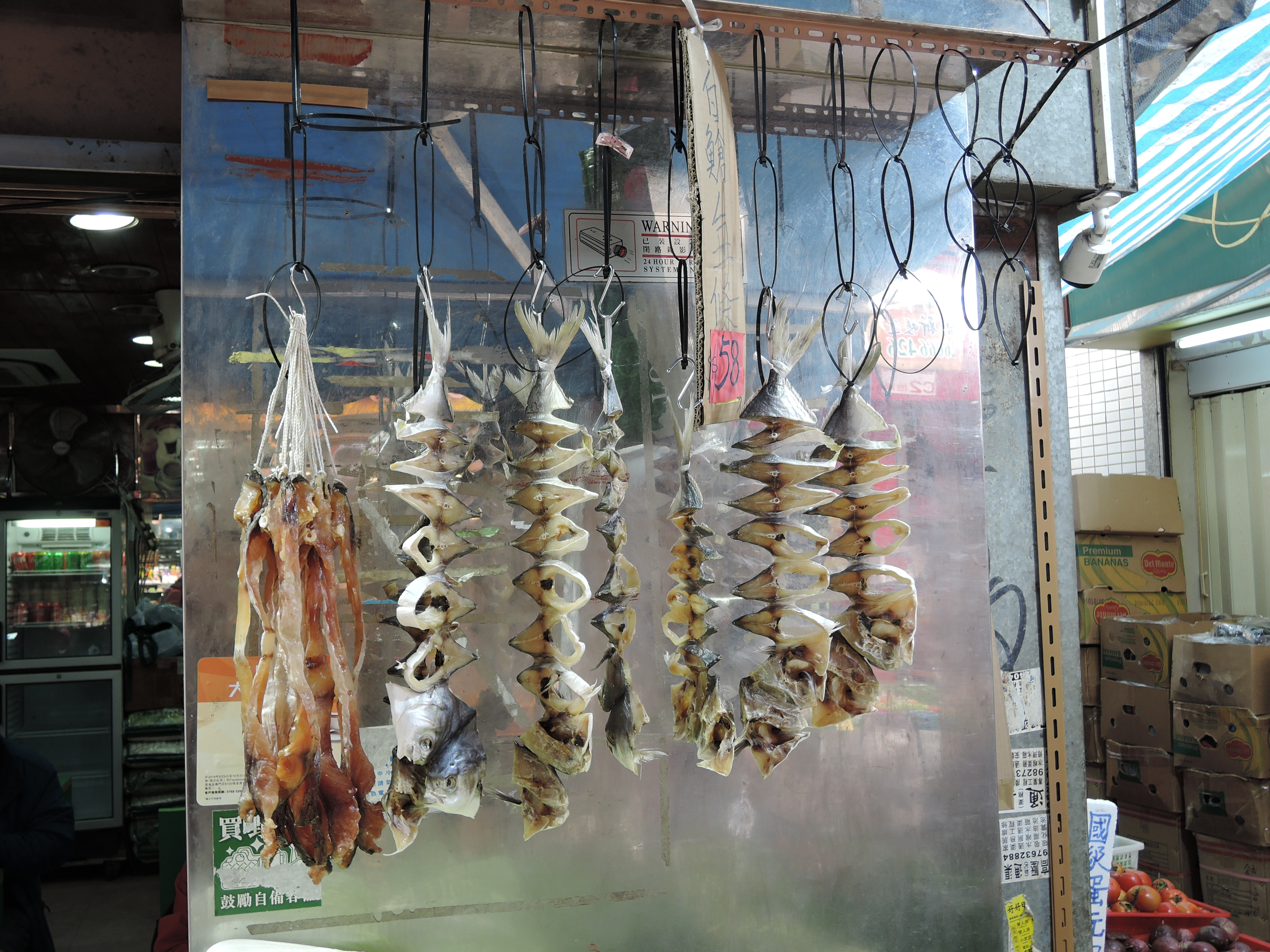
Salted dried butterfish in Chinese food store at Yuen Long, Hong Kong

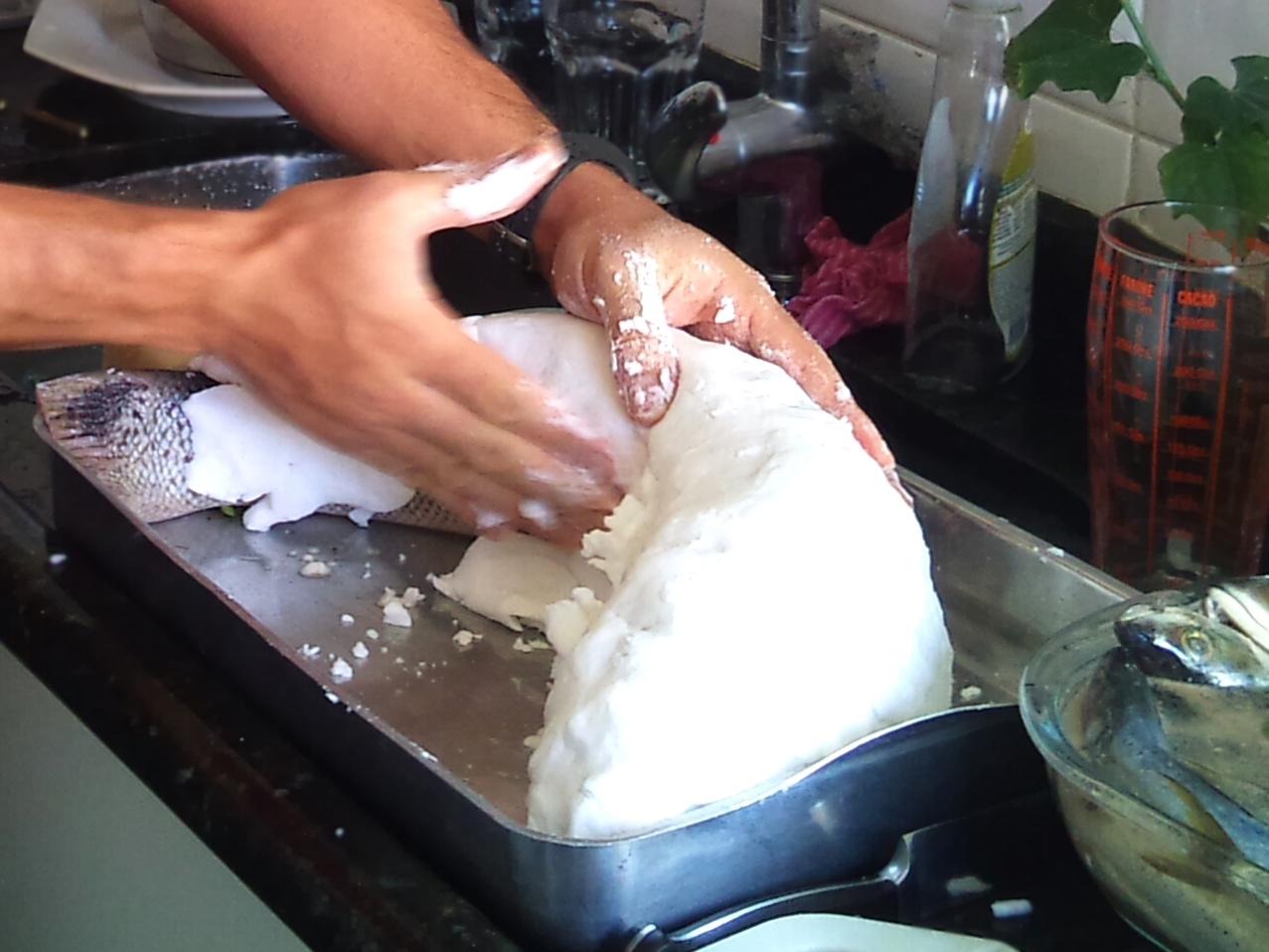
Fish in a salt crust

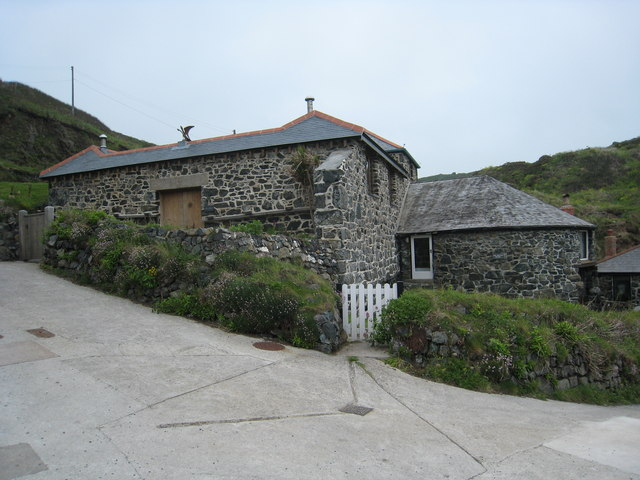
Fish cellars at Church Cove, England, used for pressing salted pilchards into barrels for storage and export to the continent

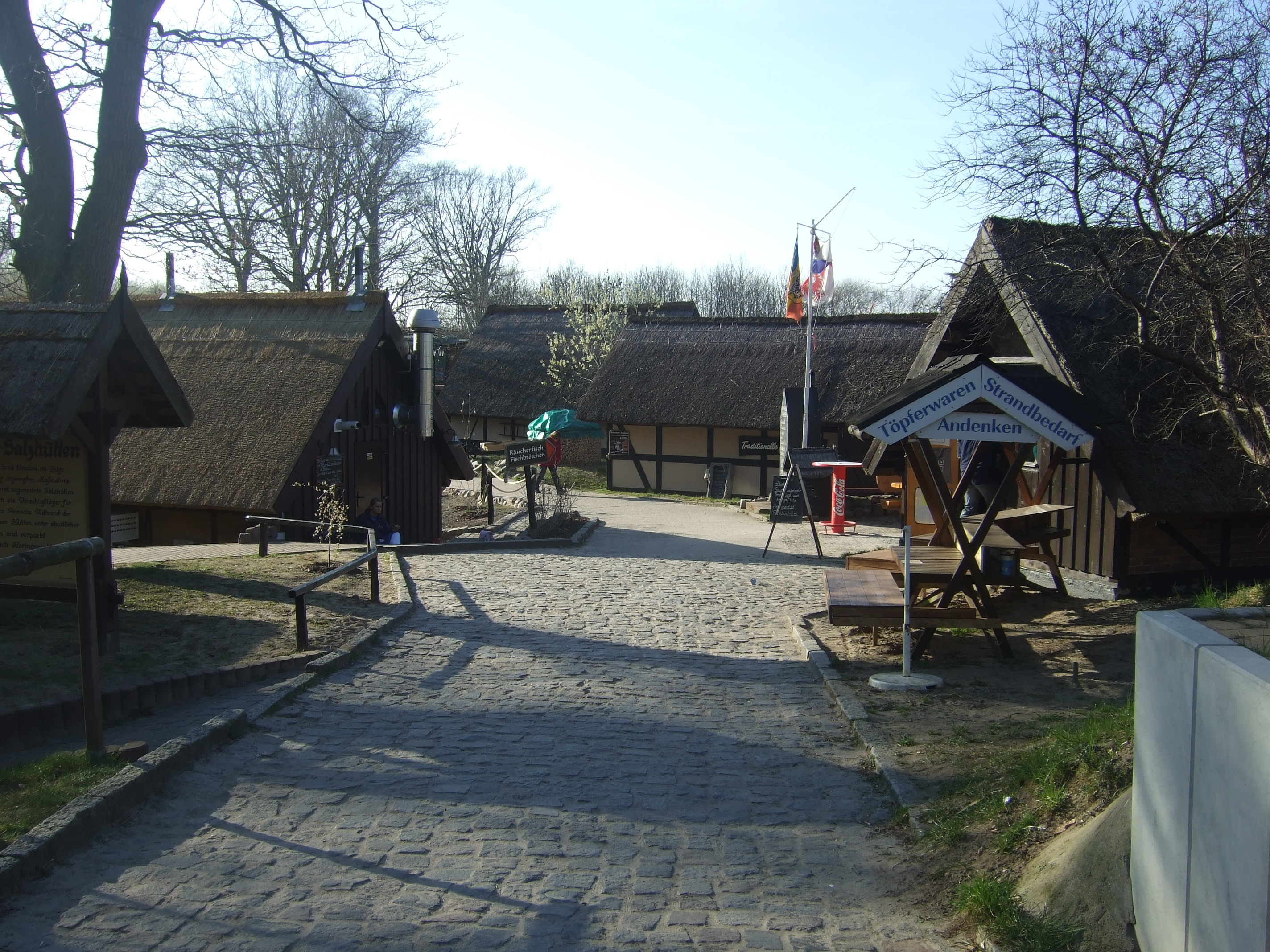
Salt cabin, a small building where fish is salted, in Koserow, Germany

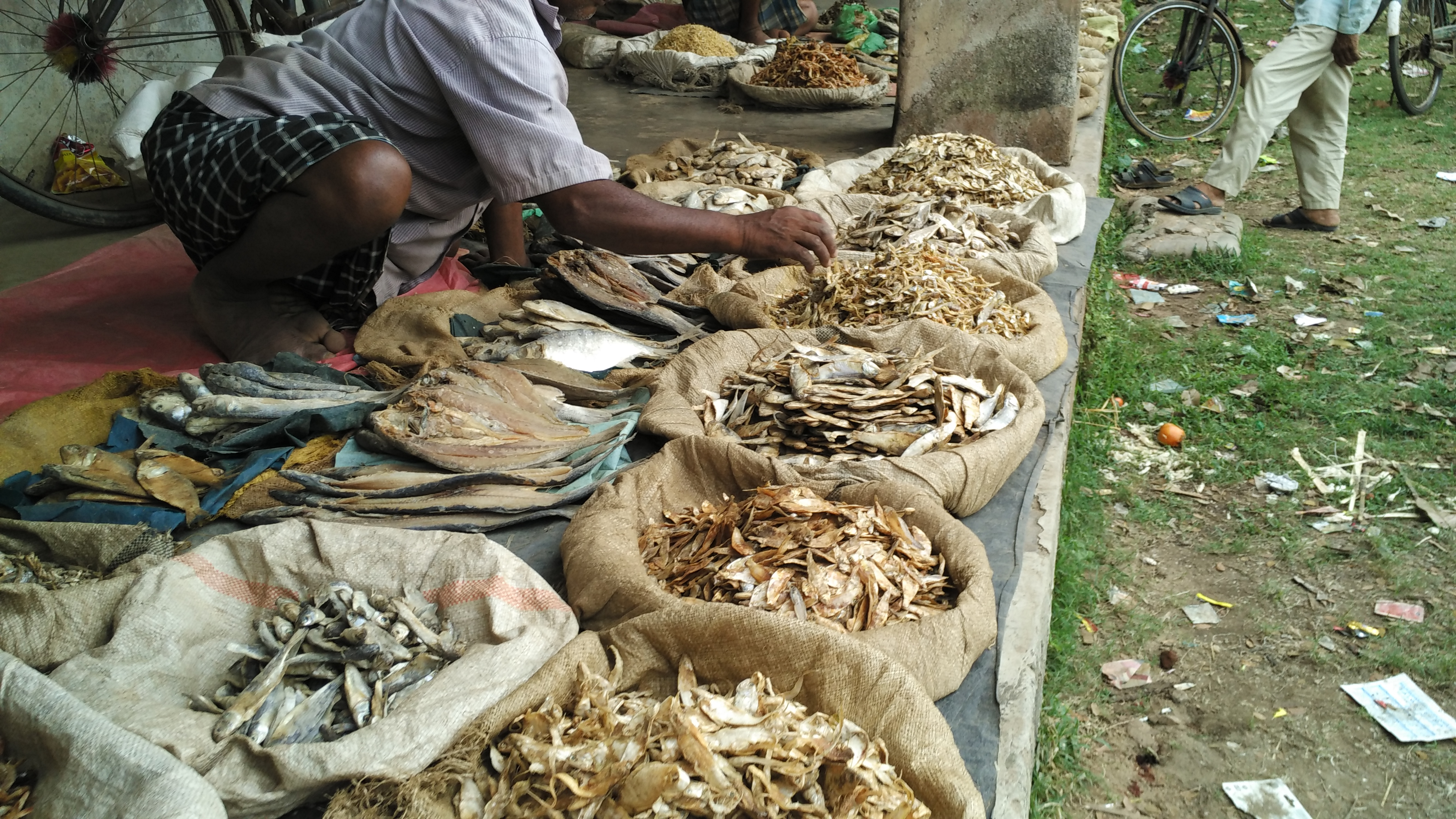
Dried fish in a market in Odisha

== See also ==
- Cantonese salted fish
- Cured fish
- Salted squid
- Dried and salted cod
- Brining
- Gibbing
- Pickling salt
- Spekesild (cured, salted Atlantic herring)
- Surströmming (lightly-salted soured Baltic herring)
