= Saeu-jeot =

Fermented shrimp in Korean cuisine

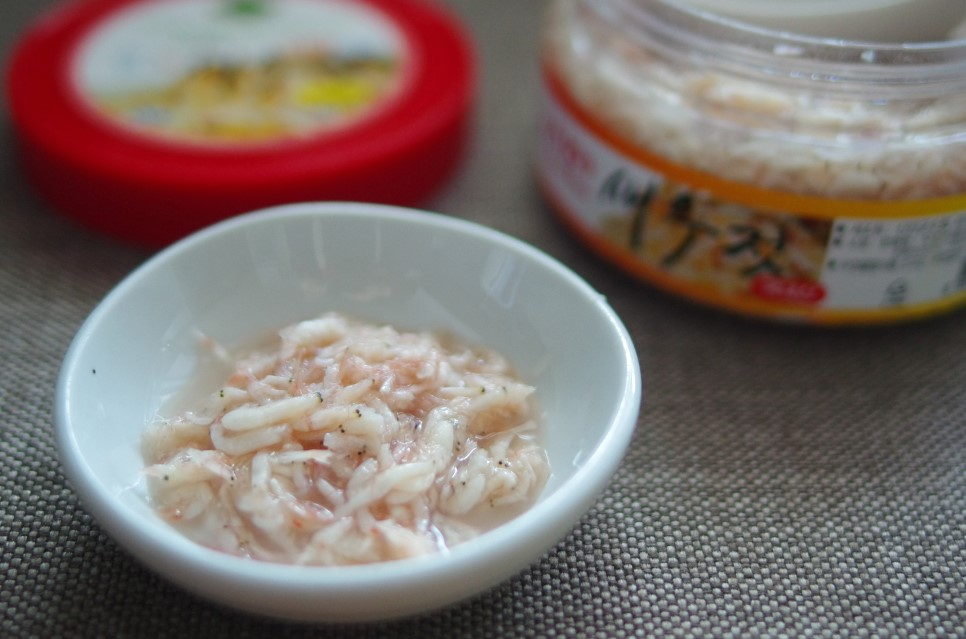
- Alternative names: Salted shrimp
- Type: Jeotgal
- Place of origin: Korea
- Main ingredients: Shrimp

Korean name
- Hangul: 새우젓
- RR: saeujeot
- MR: saeujŏt
- IPA: [sɛ̝.u.dʑʌt̚]

Saeu-jeot (Korean: 새우젓) is a variety of jeotgal, salted and fermented food made with small shrimp in Korean cuisine. It is the most consumed jeotgal along with myeolchi-jeot (멸치젓, salted anchovy jeot) in South Korea. The name consists of the two Korean words saeu (새우, shrimp) and jeot. Saeu-jeot is widely used throughout Korean cuisine but is mostly used as an ingredient in kimchi and dipping pastes. The shrimp used for making saeu-jeot are called jeot-saeu (젓새우) and are smaller and have thinner shells than ordinary shrimp.

The quality of saeu-jeot largely depends on the freshness of the shrimp. In warm weather, fishermen may immediately add salt for preliminary preservation.

== Types ==
The types of saeu-jeot depend on the kind of shrimp used and when they are harvested.

=== In spring ===
Putjeot (풋젓) is made with shrimp harvested from the end of the first month through the fourth month of the Korean calendar (lunisolar). It is called deddeugi jeot (데뜨기젓) or dotddegi jeot (돗떼기젓) in the west coast of the South Korea. Ojeot (오젓) is made with shrimp harvested in May.

=== In summer ===
Yukjeot (육젓, 六젓, six [month] jeot) is made with shrimp harvested in June and is regarded as the highest quality jeot. It is the type most preferred for making kimchi because of its richer flavor and bigger shrimp than other versions. The shrimp in yukjoet have red heads and tails. Chajeot (차젓) is made with shrimp harvested in July.

=== In fall ===
Gonjaeng-ijeot (곤쟁이젓) or jahajeot (자하젓; 紫蝦젓) is made with very small shrimp-like Neomysis awatschensis, one of the opossum shrimp family, which is called gonjaeng-i or jaha (자하; 紫蝦) in Korean. The shrimp used for it is the smallest among all saeu-jeot. They are harvested in August and September in small amounts where freshwater mixes with seawater of the abyss of the Yellow Sea. As it ferments, the jeot changes from transparent to light violet or brown in color and becomes soft in texture. Gonjaeng-ijeot is called gogaemijeot (고개미젓) in Jeolla Province. It is a local specialty of Seosan-gun, Chungcheong Province. Chujeot (추젓) is made with small shrimp harvested in autumn, which are smaller and cleaner than the shrimp in yukjeot.

=== In winter ===
Dongjeot (동젓; 冬젓) is made with shrimp harvested in November. Dongbaekha (동백하젓 冬白蝦) is made with shrimp harvested in February whose bodies are white and clean.

=== Other saeu-jeot ===
Tohajeot (토하젓; 土蝦젓) is made with toha (토하; 土蝦), small shrimp caught only in clean, fresh water of valleys. It is a local specialty of South Jeolla Province. It is also called saengijeot (생이젓).

Jajeot (자젓) is commonly called japjeot (잡젓, literally mixed jeot), which is made with several types of small shrimp without special selection. Daetdaegijeot (댓대기젓) is made with shrimp that have thick, stiff, yellowish shells. It is considered to be the lowest-quality saeu-jeot.

Saeualjeot (새우알젓) is made with the eggs of medium-sized red shrimp harvested in April. It was presented to the royal court as a local product during the late period of the Joseon dynasty and currently is only produced in Okgu-gun, North Jeolla Province.

== See also ==
- Budu – Fish sauce originating from east coast of Peninsular Malaysia
- Cincalok – Malay salted shrimp condiment
- Fish sauce – Condiment made from fish
- Jeotgal – Korean salted seafood category
- Kimchi – Korean side dish of fermented vegetables
- Korean cuisine
- Myeolchi-jeot – Korean salted and fermented anchovies
- Padaek – Lao pickled or fermented fish condiment
- Shrimp paste – Fermented condiment
