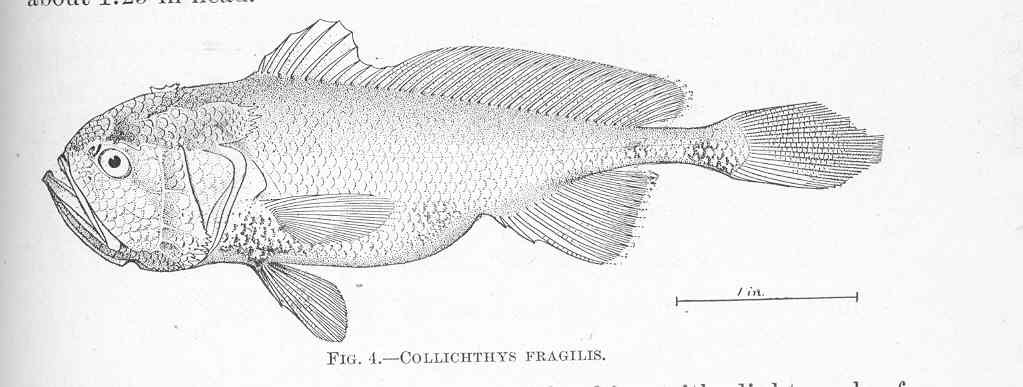
- Collichthys lucidus

Scientific classification
- Kingdom: Animalia
- Phylum: Chordata
- Class: Actinopterygii
- Order: Acanthuriformes
- Family: Sciaenidae
- Genus: Collichthys; Günther, 1860

Type species
- Sciaena lucida Richardson, 1844

Synonyms
- Hemisciaena Bleeker, 1863

= Collichthys =

Genus of fish

Collichthys is a genus of marine ray-finned fish belonging to the family Sciaenidae, the drums and croakers. The fishes in the genus are found in the Western Pacific Ocean off the coasts of China, Japan, the Korean Peninsula and Vietnam.

== Taxonomy ==
Collichthys was first proposed as a genus in 1860 by the German-born British herpetologist and ichthyologist Albert Günther with Sciaena lucida, a species described in 1844 by Sir John Richardson from "China Seas", being designated as the type species, either in 1867 by Günther or by David Starr Jordan and Carl H. Eigenmann in 1889. This genus has been placed in the subfamily Otolithinae by some workers, but the 5th edition of Fishes of the World does not recognise subfamilies within the Sciaenidae which it places in the order Acanthuriformes.

== Etymology ==
Collichthys prefeixes the Greek word for fish, ichthys, with a word Günther did not explain but which is probably derived from kolla, meaning "glue". The type species was used in China to produce isinglass. Both species in this genus have been given the common name bighead croaker.

== Species ==
Collichthys has two recognised species within it:

- Collichthys lucidus (Richardson, 1844)
- Collichthys niveatus Jordan & Starks, 1906

== Characteristics ==
Collichthys croakers are moderately sized with C. lucidus reaching a maximum published total length of 19.8 cm (7.8 in) and C. niveatus reaching 15 cm (5.9 in).

== Distribution and habitat ==
Collichthys croakers are found in the Western Pacific Ocean. C. lucidus occurs in estuarine habitats over sand and mud substrates down to depths of 90 m (300 ft) from Kyushu in Japan south to the South China Sea. C. niveatus has a more restricted range being found in the Yellow Sea and East China Sea in the sublittoral zone at depths down to 80 m (260 ft) over sandy and muddy bottoms.

== Fisheries and conservation ==
Collichthys croakers are important food fishes, especially in China and, although there is a danger of overfishing, the IUCN has classified both species as Least Concern.
