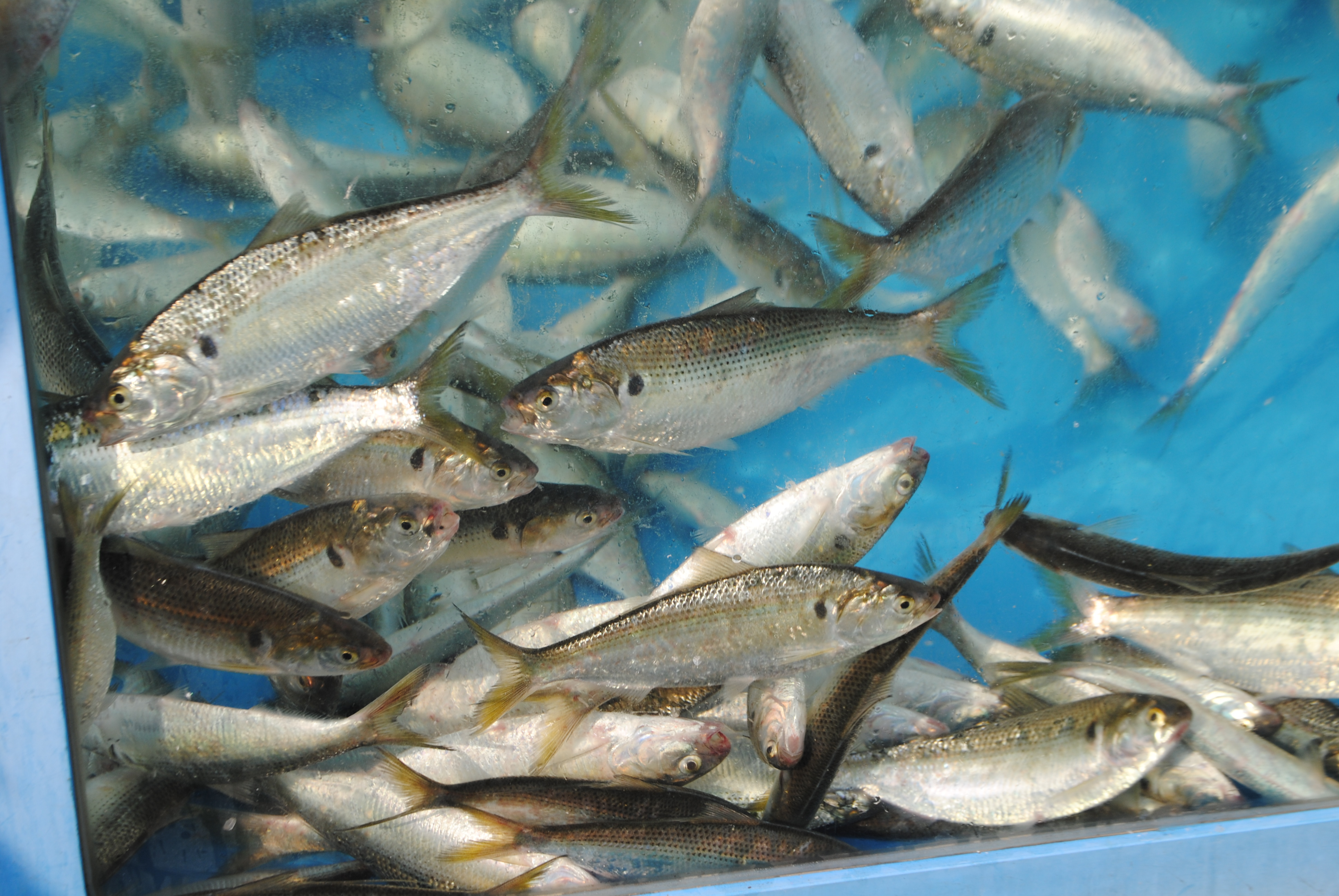

Conservation status
- Least Concern (IUCN 3.1)

Scientific classification
- Kingdom: Animalia
- Phylum: Chordata
- Class: Actinopterygii
- Division: Teleostei
- Order: Clupeiformes
- Family: Dorosomatidae
- Genus: Konosirus; D. S. Jordan & Snyder, 1900
- Species: K. punctatus

Binomial name
- Konosirus punctatus (Temminck & Schlegel, 1846)

= Konosirus =

Genus of fish

Konosirus punctatus is a species of fish in the family Dorosomatidae. It is the only member of the monotypic genus Konosirus. Its common names include dotted gizzard shad and konoshiro gizzard shad. It is native to the northwestern Pacific Ocean, where it occurs along the Asian coastline.

This fish is usually up to 25 centimetres (9.8 in) long, with the maximum recorded length of 32 centimetres (13 in). It has a somewhat compressed body and a slightly projecting snout. There is a dark spot behind the gills, with several lines of dark dots next to it.

This species occurs in the ocean, and it can be found near land in bays. It enters shallow brackish waters to spawn.

This is a food fish of some commercial importance, particularly in Asia.

== As food ==
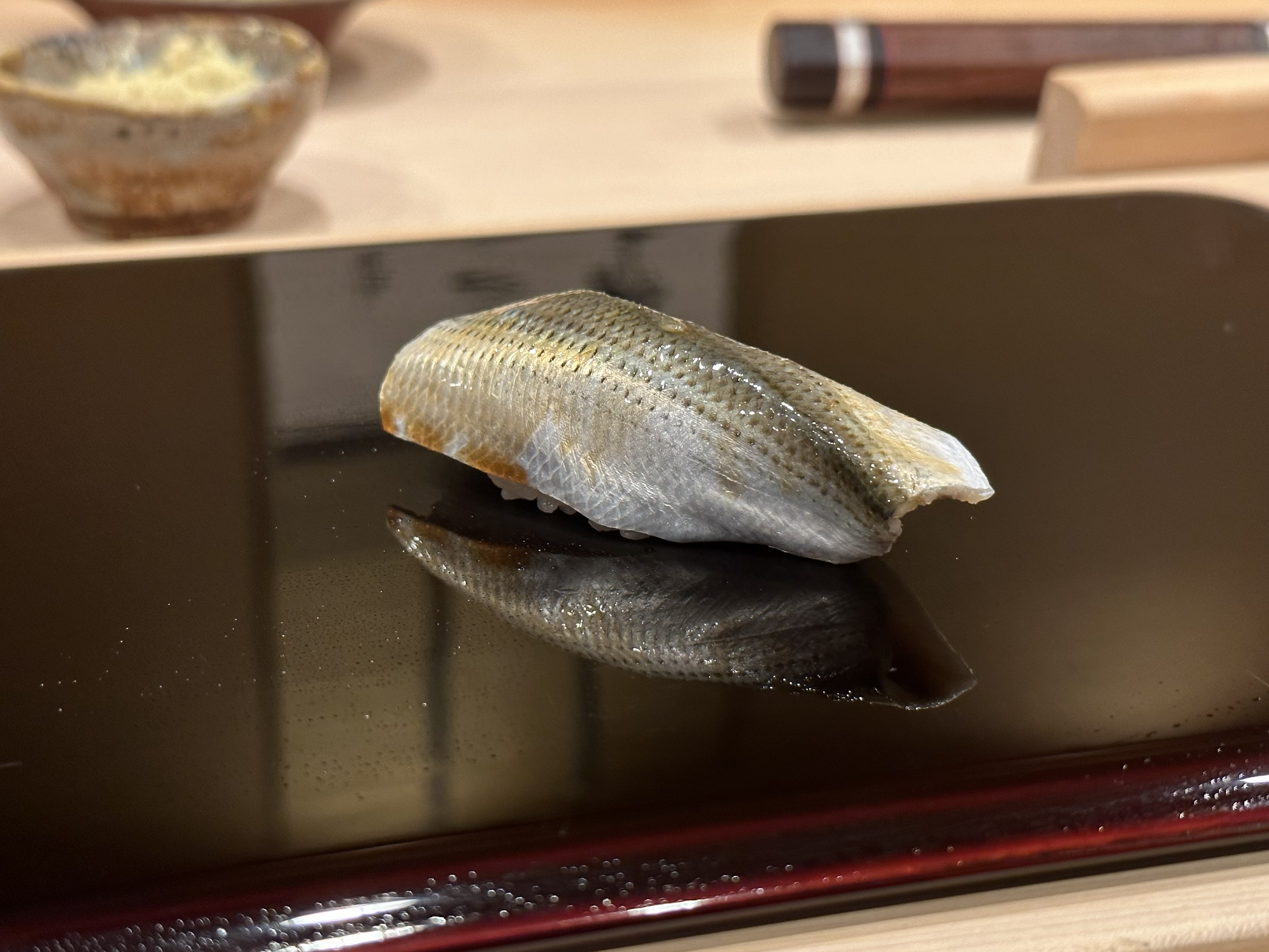
As sushi

Known as "Jeon-eo", 전어, in Korea, these fish are a seasonal specialty (autumn season) and consumed in a wide variety of ways including raw, grilled, dried, etc. There are several "Jeon-eo" regional festivals in fall which attract large crowds. It is known as "Konoshiro" (鮗 or コノシロ) in Japan. Konosirus punctatus is also an important fish consumed in China, Japan, India and Polynesia.
