= Spekesild =

Salt cured herring

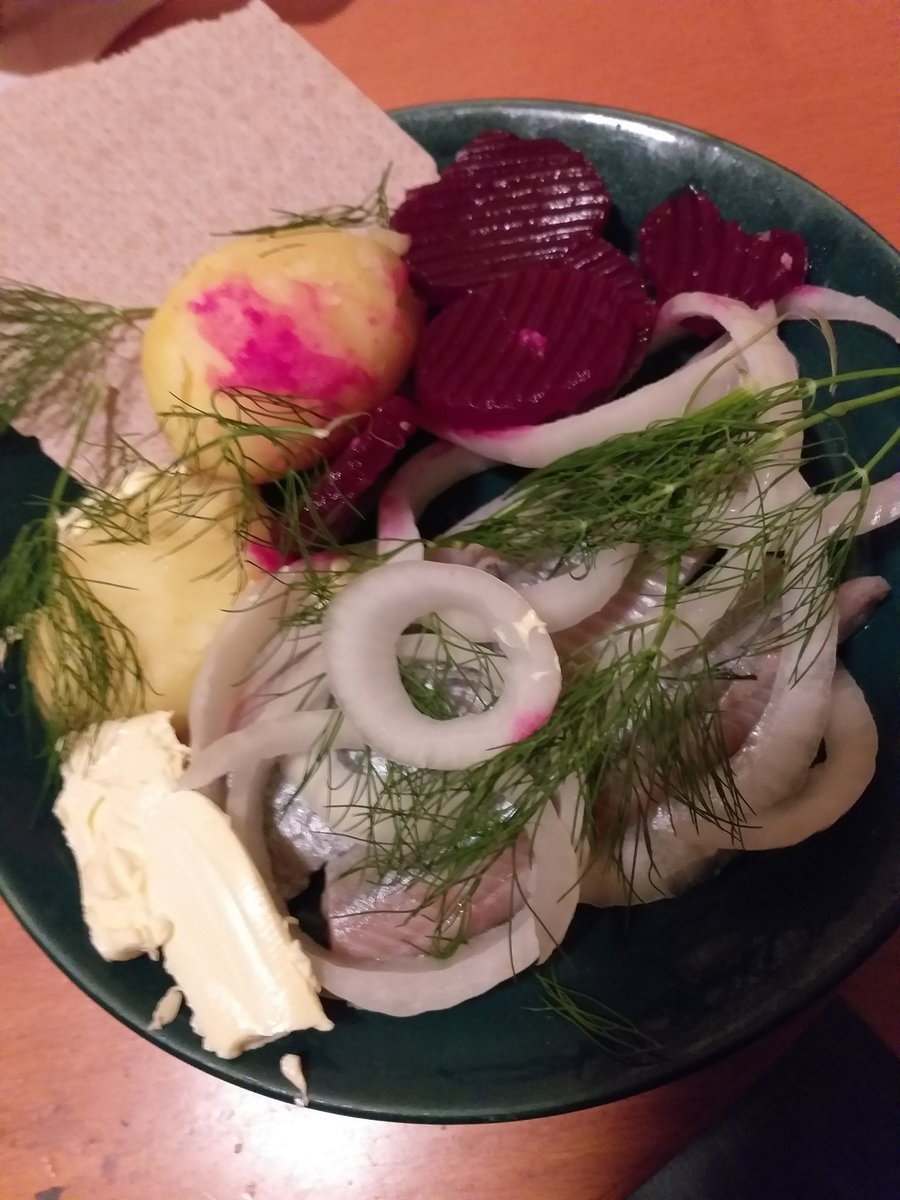
Spekesild (salt cured herring) the Norwegian way, with potatoes, raw onions, dill, pickled beets, butter and flatbrød

Spekesild (Norwegian for "salted herring") is Atlantic herring preserved using salt.

The preservation takes place by the salt extracting water from the herring, and thus poorer growth conditions are created for microbes. Until the 1960s, herring was an important export item for Norway, but the decline in the herring fisheries led to these exports stagnating sharply. In the 1990s, exports picked up somewhat, and Russia, Sweden and Poland are important markets. The salted herring is soaked in freshwater for one and a half to two hours for desalination before eating.

In Norway, spekesild was for hundreds of years considered a poor man's diet that kept hunger away. A traditional Norwegian dish with salted herring (spekesild) is along with boiled potatoes, raw onions, dill, pickled beetroots, butter or crème fraîche and flatbrød.

== See also ==
- Salted fish
