= Korean brining salt =

Coarse salt

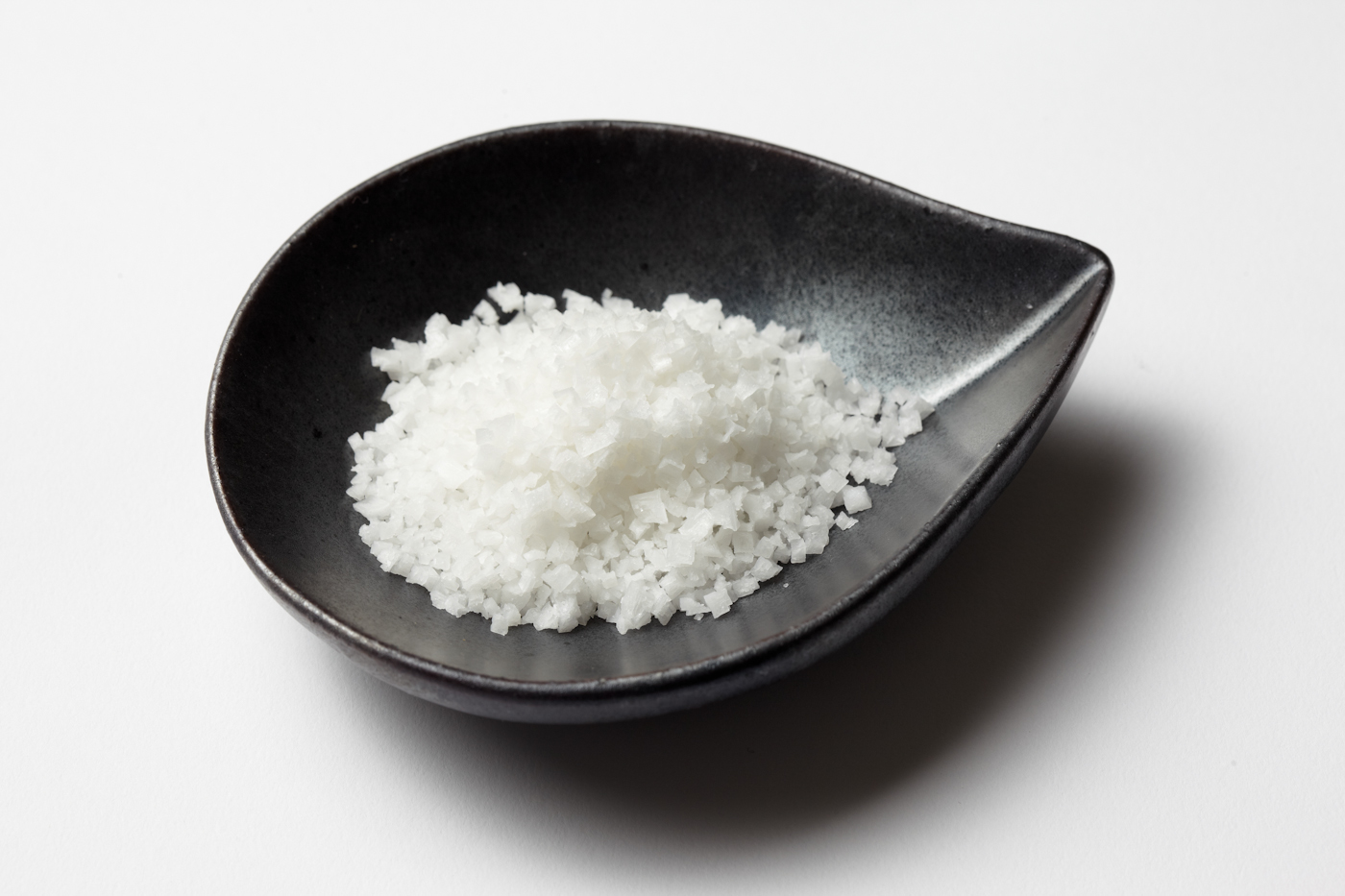
A bowl of Korean sea salt

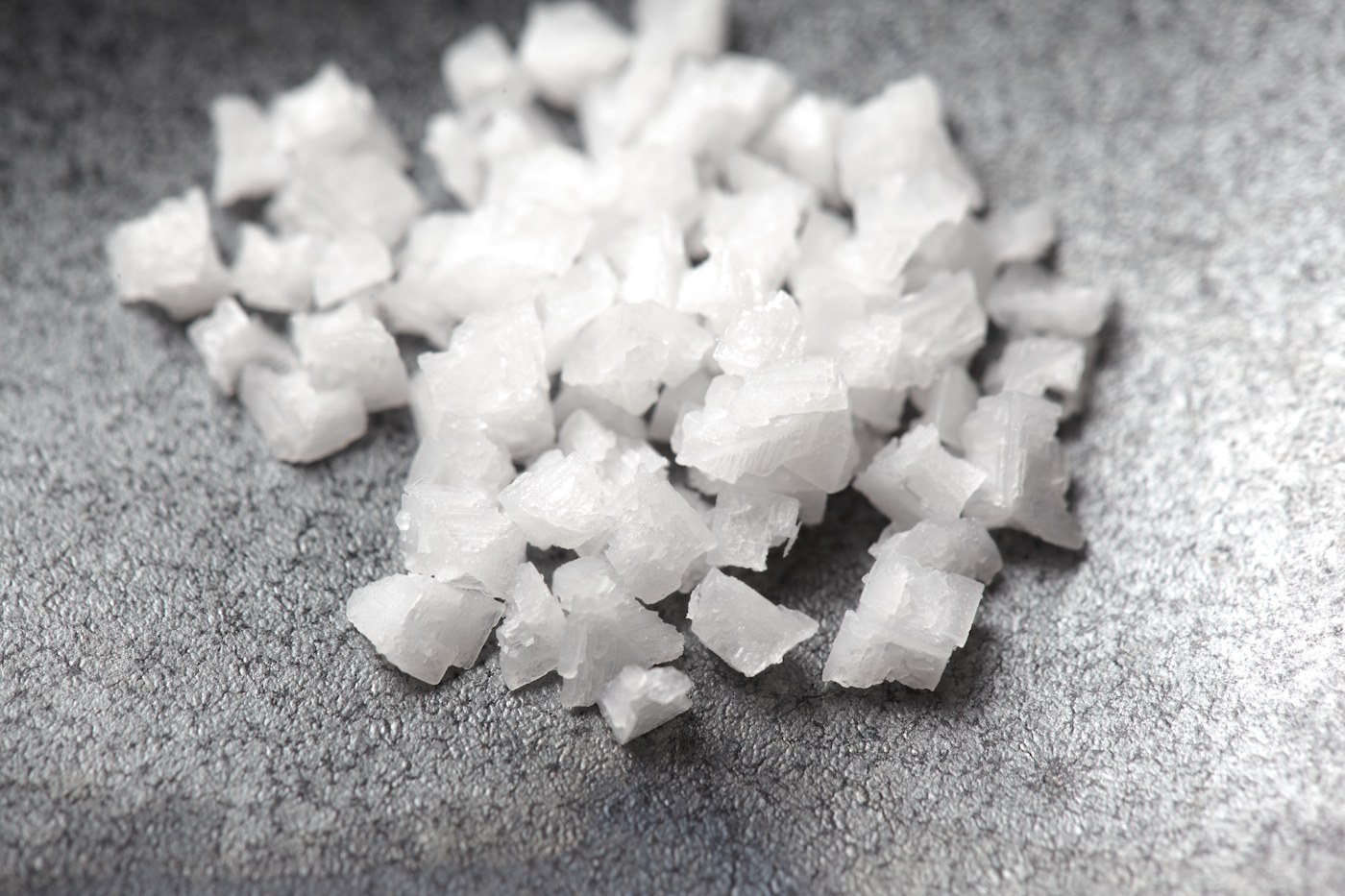
Korean sea salt crystals

Korean brining salt, also called Korean sea salt, is a variety of edible salt with a larger grain size compared to common kitchen salt. It is called gulgeun-sogeum (굵은소금; "coarse salt") or wang-sogeum (왕소금; "king/queen salt") in Korean. The salt is used mainly for salting napa cabbages when making kimchi. Because it is minimally processed, there are microorganisms present in the salt, which serve to help develop flavours in fermented foods.
