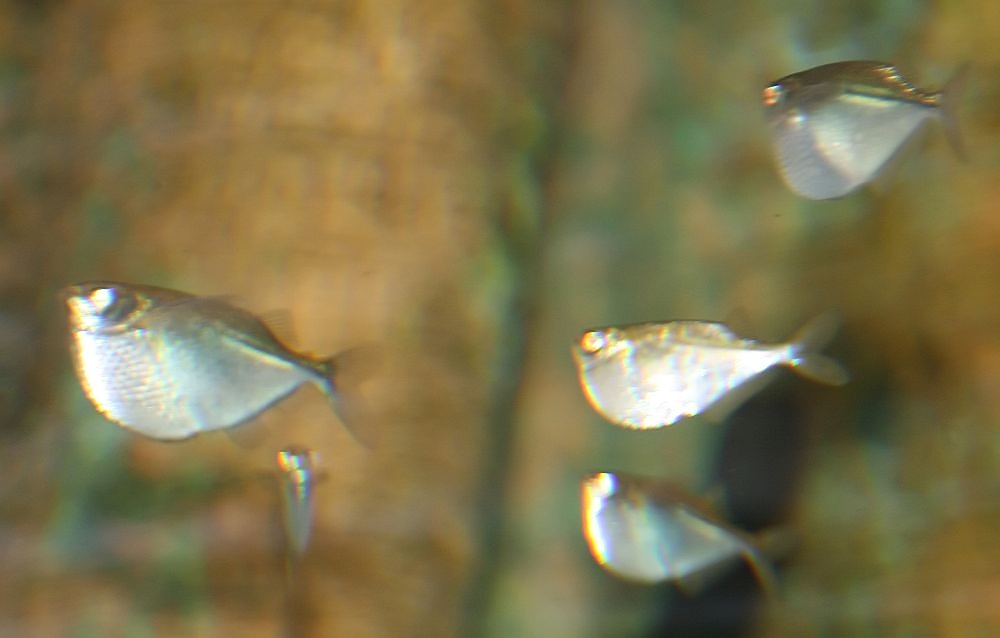

Conservation status
- Least Concern (IUCN 3.1)

Scientific classification
- Kingdom: Animalia
- Phylum: Chordata
- Class: Actinopterygii
- Order: Characiformes
- Family: Gasteropelecidae
- Genus: Thoracocharax
- Species: T. stellatus

Binomial name
- Thoracocharax stellatus (Kner, 1858)
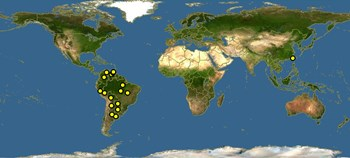

Synonyms
- Gastropelecus stellatus Kner, 1858

= Thoracocharax stellatus =

Species of fish

Thoracocharax stellatus, the silver hatchetfish, spotfin hatchetfish, spotted hatchetfish or platinum hatchetfish, is a species of freshwater ray-finned fish belonging to the family Gasteropelecidae, the freshwater hatchet fishes. This species is found throughout tropical and subtropical South America in the Amazon, Orinoco, Paraguay and Tocantins-Araguaia basins. This species is one of the largest of the hatchetfishes. It is usually found in areas with abundant riparian vegetation.

== Taxonomy ==
Thoracocharax stellatus was first formally described as Gastropelecus stellatus in 1858 by the Austrian ichthyologist Rudolf Kner, with its type locality given as the Rio Cuiabá in Brazil. In 1907, Henry Weed Fowler proposed a new subgenus, Thoracocharax, of the genus Gasteropelecus, and designated G. stellaris as its type species. It was also the only species then classified in the subgenus. Thoracocharax is now considered one of three genera, alongside Gasteroplecus and Carnegiella, which compride the family Gasteropelecidae, the freshwater hatchetfishes. This family is classified in the suborder Characoidei of the order Characiformes.

The genus Thoracocharax is monophyletic, and is sister to Carnegiella and Gasteropelecus. Thoracocharax stellatus has four distinct lineages, suggesting this species may represent a species complex. The four lineages are found in the following rivers:

- Orinoco River (most basal): Venezuela and Colombia
- Paraguay River: Paraguay
- Araguaia River: Brazil
- Amazonas River: Brazil

== Etymology ==
Thoracocharax stellatus is the type species of the genus Thoracocharax. This name is derived from the Greek θώραξ (thṓraks), meaning "chest" or "breast", coupled with the word Charax, type genus of the order Characiformes, which comes from the ancient Greek χάραξ (chárax), meaning a palisade of pointed sticks, in reference to the densely packed sharp teeth of the fish. The species epithet, stellatus, is Latin for "starry" or "studded with stars", a reference to the fish's platinum-coloured shiny appearance.

== Description ==
Thoracocharax stellatus is superficially similar to Thoracocharax securis, but has a prominent dark spot on the dorsal fin. In the wild, adults vary in length between 21 and 55mm, but in captivity can grow up to between 60 and 70mm. Its maximum length is 80mm.

== Distribution and habitat ==
Thoracocharax stellatus is found in subtropical and tropical South America, in the Amazon, Orinoco, Parana and Paraguay river systems. It has been found in Argentina, Bolivia, Brazil, Colombia, Ecuador, Paraguay, Peru, Uruguay and Venezuela. It is a pelagic fish which occurs in open waters in larger rivers.

== Diet ==
In the wild, feeding occurs at sunrise and sunset, and analysis of the stomach contents of 88 specimens indicates that this species is mostly insectivorous (99.6% of stomach contents were insects). Its food consists mostly of ants, beetles, and mayflies. Thoracocharax stellatus appears to be a specialist on terrestrial insects, and feeds by leaping out of the water and taking insects from riparian vegetation.

== Utilisation ==
Thoracocharax stellatus is part of the aquarium trade and has been bred in captivity.
