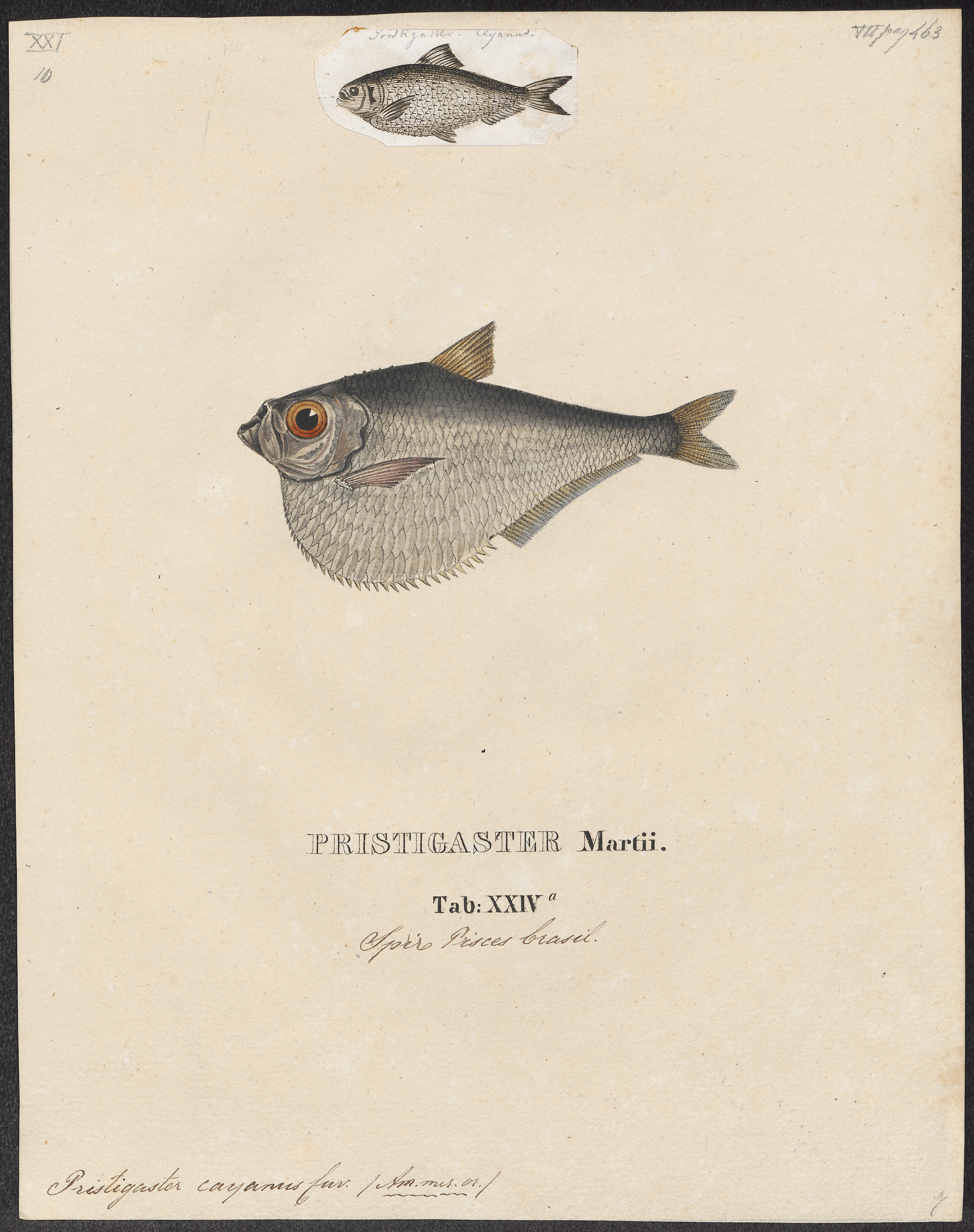
- Pristigaster cayana print from Iconographia Zoologica

Conservation status
- Least Concern (IUCN 3.1)

Scientific classification
- Kingdom: Animalia
- Phylum: Chordata
- Class: Actinopterygii
- Order: Clupeiformes
- Family: Pristigasteridae
- Genus: Pristigaster
- Species: P. cayana

Binomial name
- Pristigaster cayana Cuvier, 1829

Synonyms
- Pristigaster americanus Guérin-Méneville, 1844; Pristigaster argenteus Schinz, 1822; Pristigaster cayanus Cuvier, 1829; Pristigaster lichtensteini Jarocki, 1822; Pristigaster lichtensteinii Jarocki, 1822; Pristigaster martii Agassiz, 1829; Pristigaster phaeton Valenciennes, 1847; Pristigaster triangularis Stark, 1828

= Pristigaster cayana =

Species of fish

Pristigaster cayana, known as the Amazon hatchet herring, is a species of freshwater fish in the Pristigasteridae family of the order Clupeiformes. It occurs in the Amazon River basin.

== Taxonomy ==
Pristigaster cayana was first described by Georges Cuvier in 1829. It is known by the common name Amazon hatchet herring. The holotype was collected from the Amazon River in Brazil and is housed at the Museum national d'histoire naturelle in Paris, France. It is one of two species in the genus Pristigaster, alongside P. whiteheadi, both of which are found in South America.

== Distribution and habitat ==
Pristigaster cayana is found in much of the Amazon River basin, including in Bolivia, Brazil, Colombia, Ecuador, Guyana, Peru, and Venezuela. It lives in rivers within 4 metres (13 ft) of the surface. It is believed to be tolerant of brackish water, as its range appears to extend close to the mouth of the Amazon River where there is increased salinity.

== Description ==
The fish's belly in profile is deep and strongly convex with 30–33 scutes. The anal fin has 45–54 soft rays; neither the anal fin nor the dorsal fin have spines. The anal fin begins behind the base of the dorsal fin; the pectoral fins sit relatively high on the fish's body. In larger individuals, the upper lobe of the caudal fin terminates in a filament. The species grows to a maximum standard length of 14.5 centimetres (5.7 in). Its resemblance to members of the genus Thoracocharax may be a result of mimicry.

== Conservation ==
Pristigaster cayana is assessed as a least concern species on the IUCN Red List. It has a wide range that includes several protected areas; while there is limited data on its population size and trend, it has been observed to be abundant in some localities. There have been no major threats to the population identified.
