= Silver hatchetfish =

Silver hatchetfish may refer to:

- Marine hatchetfishes of the genus Argyropelecus
- The freshwater hatchetfish species Gasteropelecus levis
