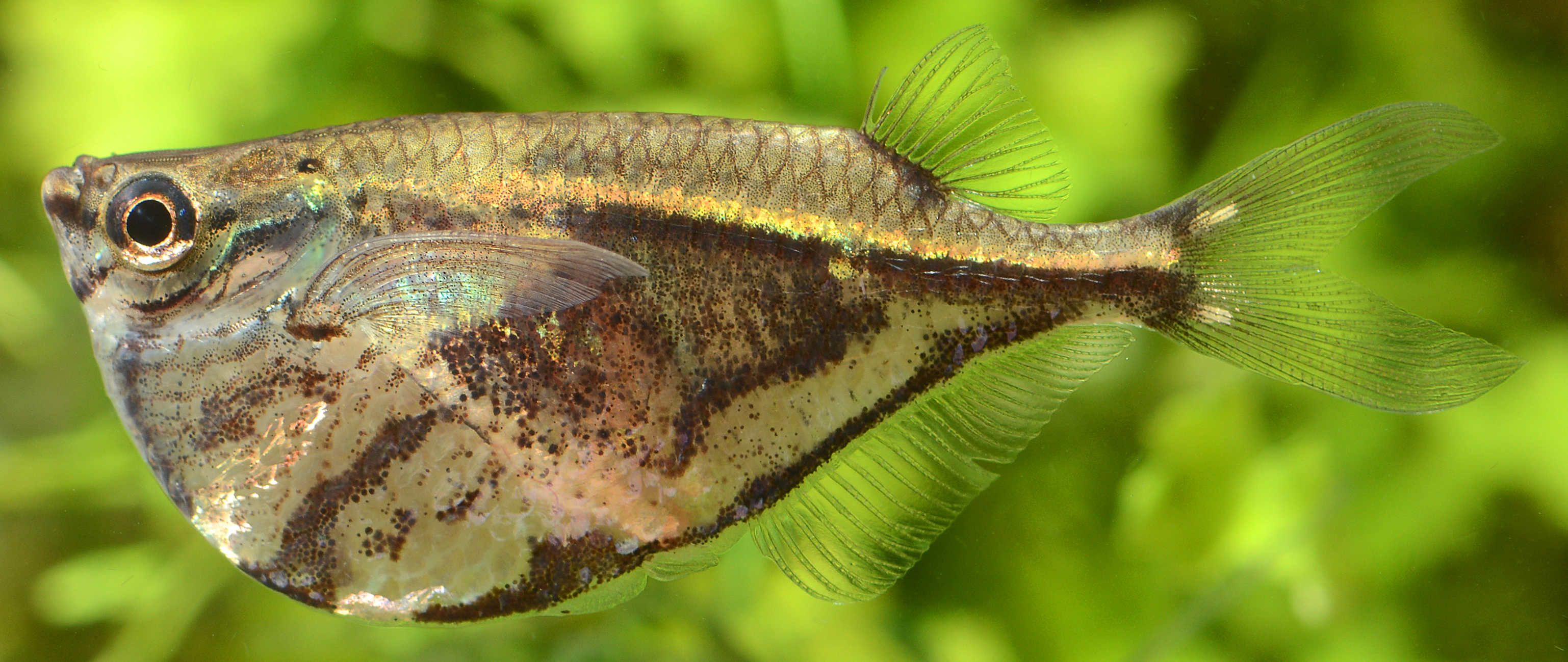
- Carnegiella strigata lateral view

Conservation status
- Least Concern (IUCN 3.1)

Scientific classification
- Kingdom: Animalia
- Phylum: Chordata
- Class: Actinopterygii
- Order: Characiformes
- Family: Gasteropelecidae
- Genus: Carnegiella
- Species: C. strigata

Binomial name
- Carnegiella strigata (Günther, 1864)
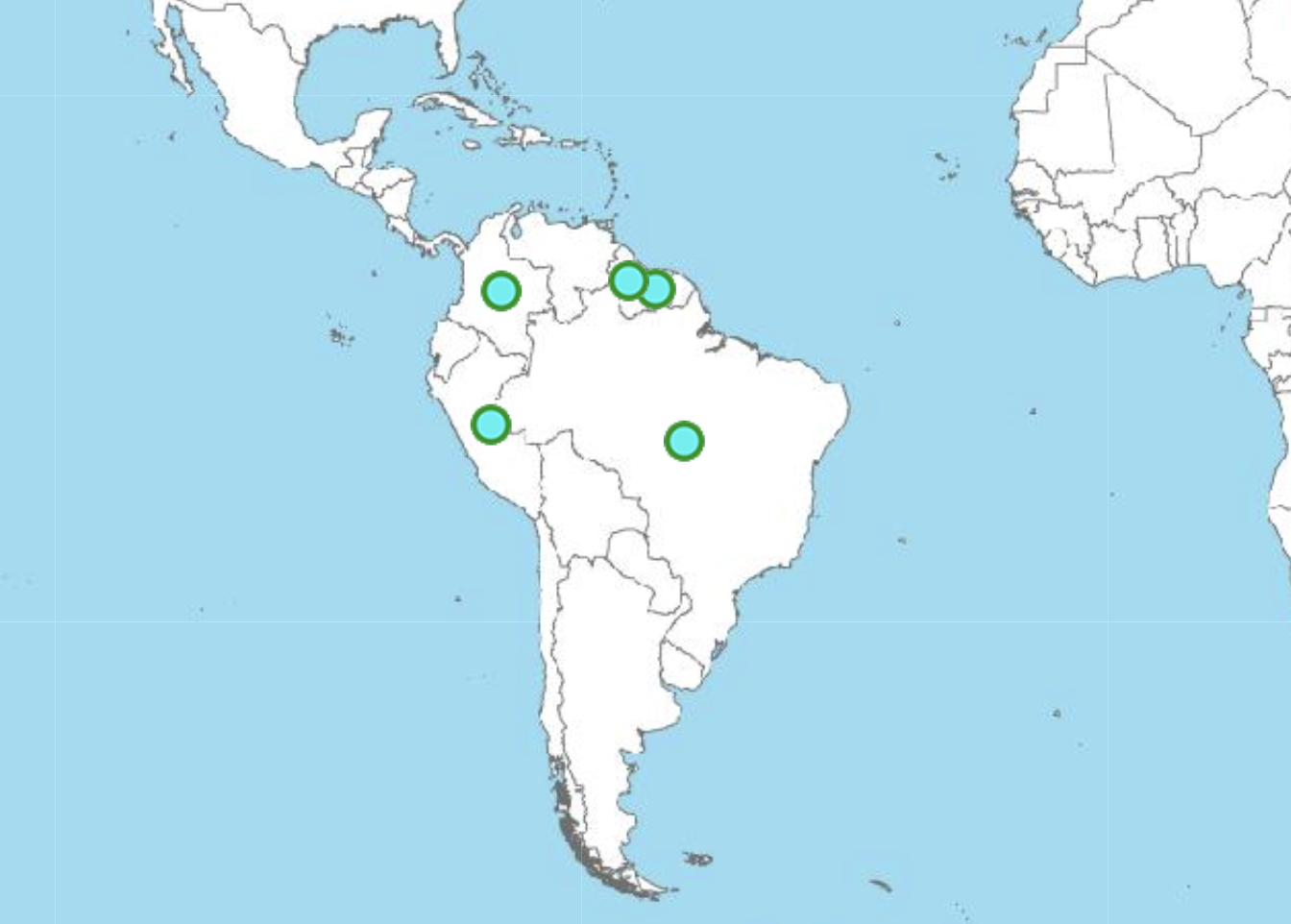
- C. strigata's native distribution

Synonyms
- Gasteropelecus strigatus Günther, 1864; Gastropelecus fasciatus Garman, 1890; Carnegiella strigata vesca Fraser-Brunner, 1950; Carnegiella vesca Fraser-Brunner, 1950; Carnegiella strigata marowini Hoedeman, 1952; Carnegiella strigata surinamensis Hoedeman, 1952

= Marbled hatchetfish =

Species of fish

The marbled hatchetfish (Carnegiella strigata) is a species of freshwater ray-finned fish belonging to the family Gasteropelecidae, the freshwater hatchetfishes. The small deep-bodied fish, in the genera Carnegiella, is from the family Gasteropelecidae which includes both Gasteropelecus and Thoracocharax. This species is found in South America, and in rivers and streams all throughout Northern South America.

== Taxonomy ==
The marbled hatchetfish was first formally described as Gasteropelecus strigatus in 1864 by the German-born British herpetologist and ichthyologist Albert Günther, with no type locality given. In 1909, Carl H. Eigenmann classified G. strigatus in the new monospecific genus Carnegiella. He also designated it as the type species of the new genus. The genus Carnegiella is classified within the family Gasteropelecidae, within the suborder Characoidei of the order Characiformes.

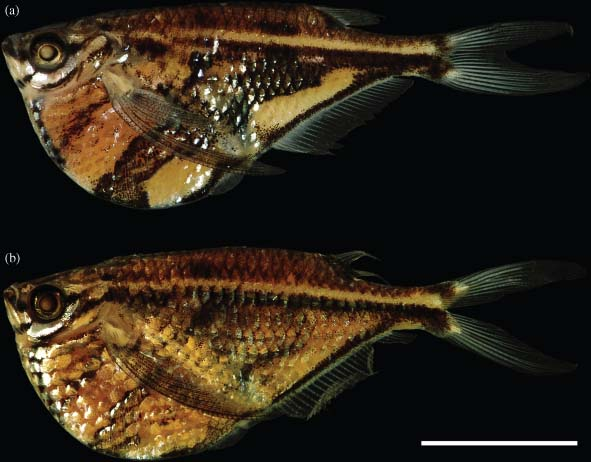
Two distinct morphological types of Carnegiella strigata described by Géry. (1973): (a) intermediate form and (b) strigata form.

== Etymology ==
The marbled hatchetfish is the type species of the genus Carnegiella, a name which adds -ella, a Latin suffix indicating endearment, onto the name "Carnegie". This name honours Margaret Carnegie, the only daughter of the Scottish-American industrialist Andrew Carnegie, who established the Carnegie Museum, which co-sponsored Eigenmenn's expedition to British Guiana in 1908, and which published his report of that expedition. The specific name, strigata, is Latin for "furrowed" or "grooved", an allusion Günther did not explain, but which probably refers to the four dark bands radiating out from the middle of the throat.

== Description ==
The marbled hatchetfish has a maximum standard length of 3.5 cm (1.4 in). This fish has a golden silver coloured triangular body, which has a pale stripe running from the head to the tail. It has a dark brown marbled pattern over its body. The colour pattern, the depth of the body and the fin ray counts are variable in different populations, and this has led to a number of subspecies being described. In 1977, Jacques Géry referred to these subspecies as forms and reduced them to two: the nominate subspecies with "V-shaped" pattern on the body from the Guianas and northern Amazon basin, and C. s. fasciatus which has a "Y-shaped" pattern and is found in most of the Amazon basin. There are intermediate forms in the Orinoco and Rio Negro basins.

== Distribution and habitat ==
The marbled hatchetfish is found in South America, where it occurs in the Amazon and Orinoco drainage systems and the coastal drainages of the Guianas. It has been recorded from Brazil, Bolivia, Peru, Ecuador, Colombia, Venezuela, Guyana, Suriname and French Guiana. This species is apparently only found in blackwater environments. In the Rio Negro drainage, it occurs in habitats which are characterised by dense, frequently overhanging, riverside vegetation, and where the streambed is covered in fallen branches, tree roots and leaf litter. The water in these streams is usually acidic, soft water, and has low conductivity with a brownish stain caused by humic substances released as a result of the decomposition of organic material.

== Biology ==
The marbled hatchetfish is a pelagic fish which lives in groups near the surface. Its diet consists of crustaceans and insects. Females have larger abdomens than males. They lay eggs which fall to the streambed or into vegetatio. At 25 °C (77 °F), the eggs hatch 36 hours later. In the rainy season, these fishes move upstream into tributaries and into the flooded forest to feed and spawn.

== Utilisation ==
The marbled hatchetfish is a popular fish in the aquarium trade. Most fishes in this trade are caught from the wild in Brazil. They are captured for the trade in the Rio Negro of Brazil, but there is no information on the effect of this trade on this subpopulation.

== See also ==
- List of freshwater aquarium fish species
