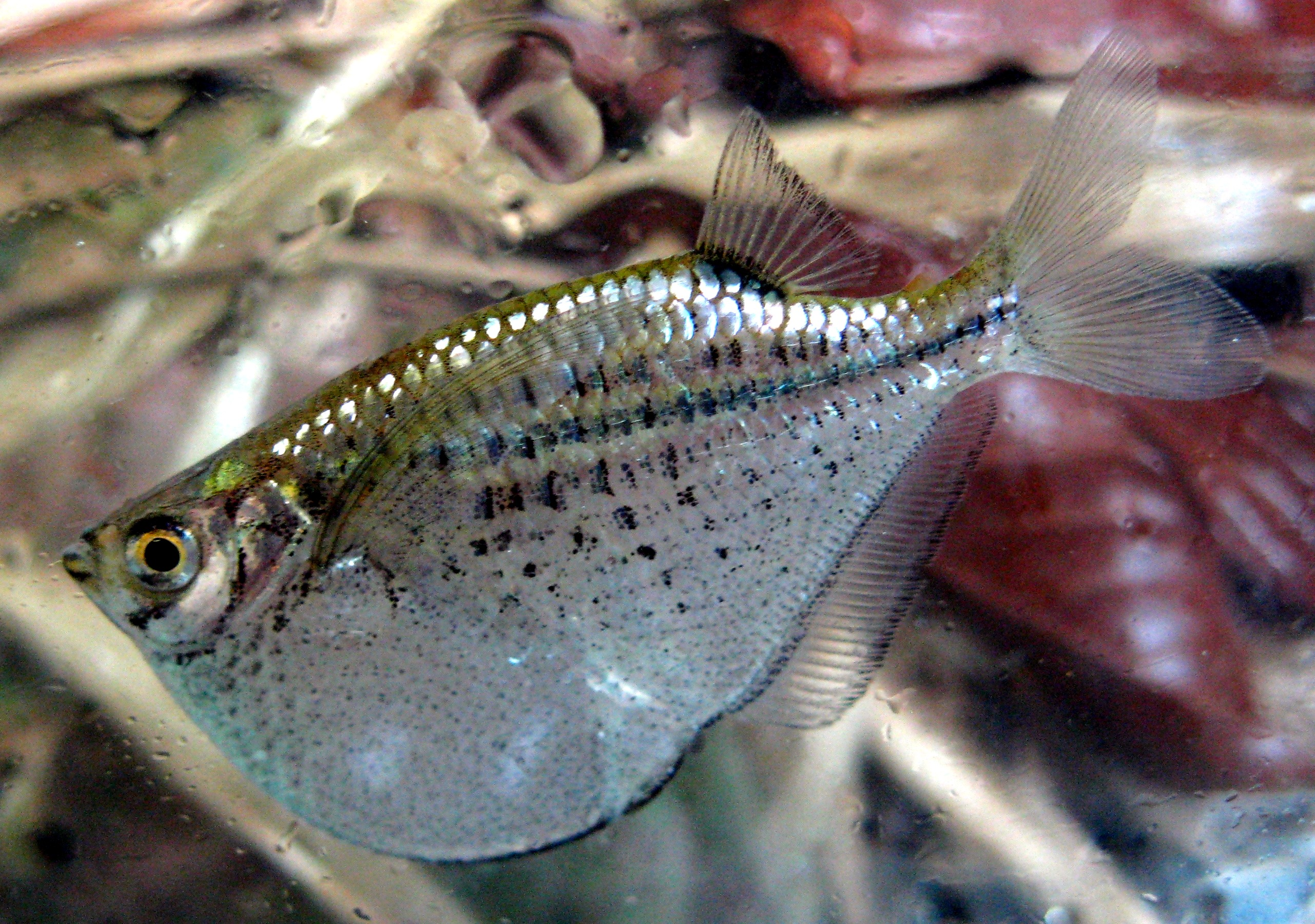

Conservation status
- Least Concern (IUCN 3.1)

Scientific classification
- Kingdom: Animalia
- Phylum: Chordata
- Class: Actinopterygii
- Order: Characiformes
- Family: Gasteropelecidae
- Genus: Gasteropelecus
- Species: G. maculatus

Binomial name
- Gasteropelecus maculatus Steindachner, 1879

Synonyms
- Thoracocharax brevis C. H. Eigenmann, 1912; Thoracocharax magdalenae C. H. Eigenmann, 1912

= Gasteropelecus maculatus =

Species of fish

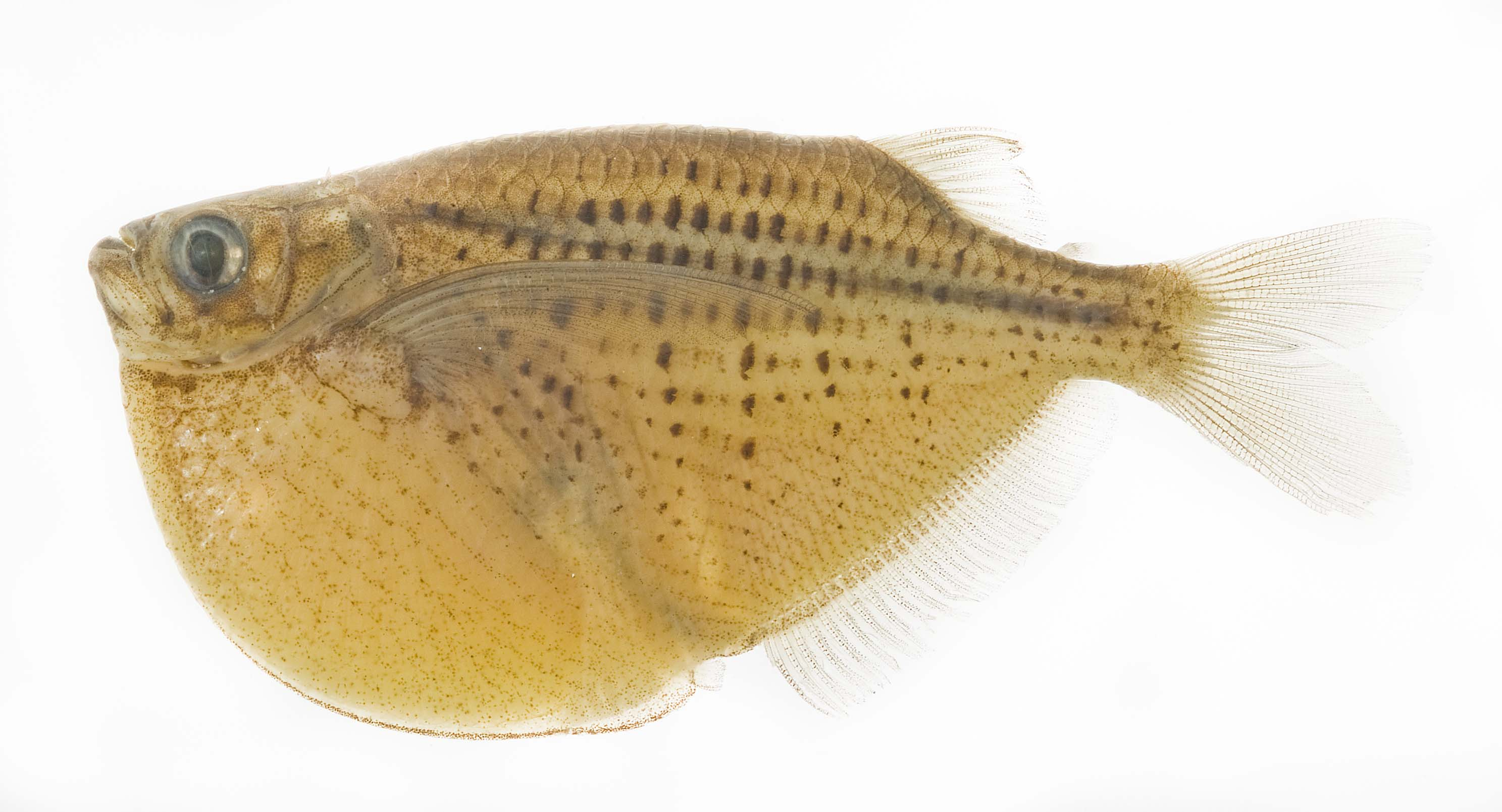
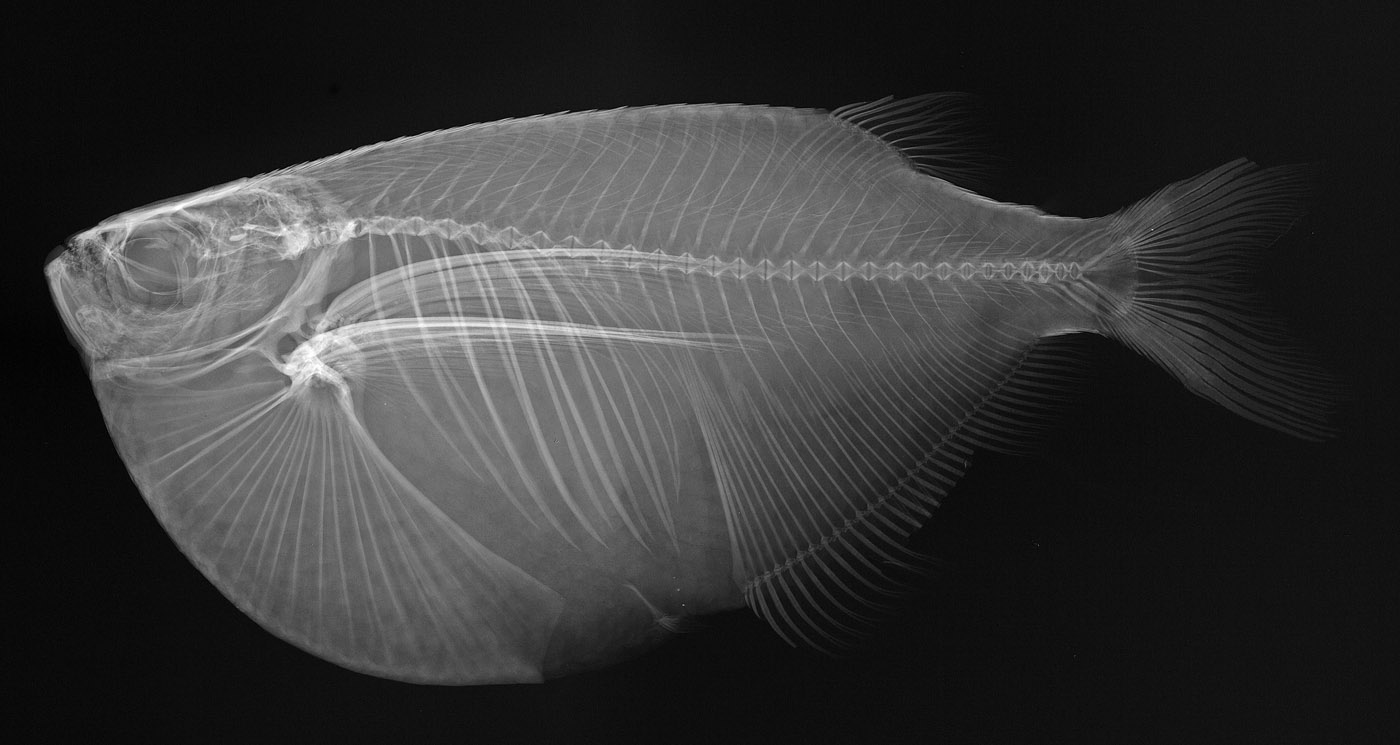
Conventional and X-ray images

Gasteropelecus maculatus, the spotted hatchetfish, is a species of freshwater ray-finned fish belonging to the family Gasteropelecidae, the freshwater hatchetfishes. This fish is found in Central and South America from eastern Panama through western Colombia. It grows up to 6.4 cm and feeds on small crustaceans, larvae and mosquitoes.
