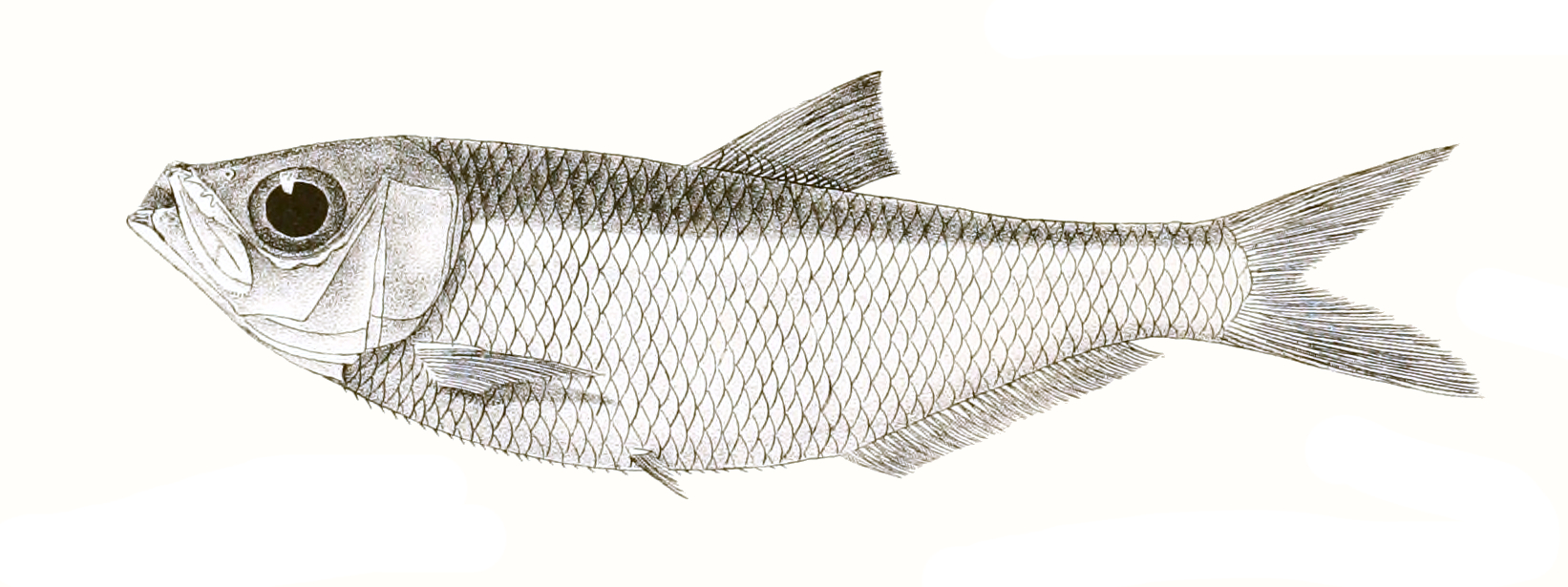

Scientific classification
- Kingdom: Animalia
- Phylum: Chordata
- Class: Actinopterygii
- Order: Clupeiformes
- Family: Pristigasteridae
- Genus: Pellona
- Species: P. ditchela

Binomial name
- Pellona ditchela Valenciennes, 1847

Synonyms
- Pellona hoevenii Bleeker, 1862; Pellona natalensis Gilchrist and Thompson, 1908

= Pellona ditchela =

Indian pellona

Species of ray-finned fish

Pellona ditchela, called the Indian pellona, ditchelee and the toothed shad, is a species of longfin herring native to the coasts, mangrove swamps, and estuaries of the Indian Ocean and the western Pacific, generally in tropical waters. Some individuals can reach 16 cm, with the average closer to 10 cm.

The species is commercially fished, with 10,014 t landed in 1999. It is considered a good bait for tuna fishing.
