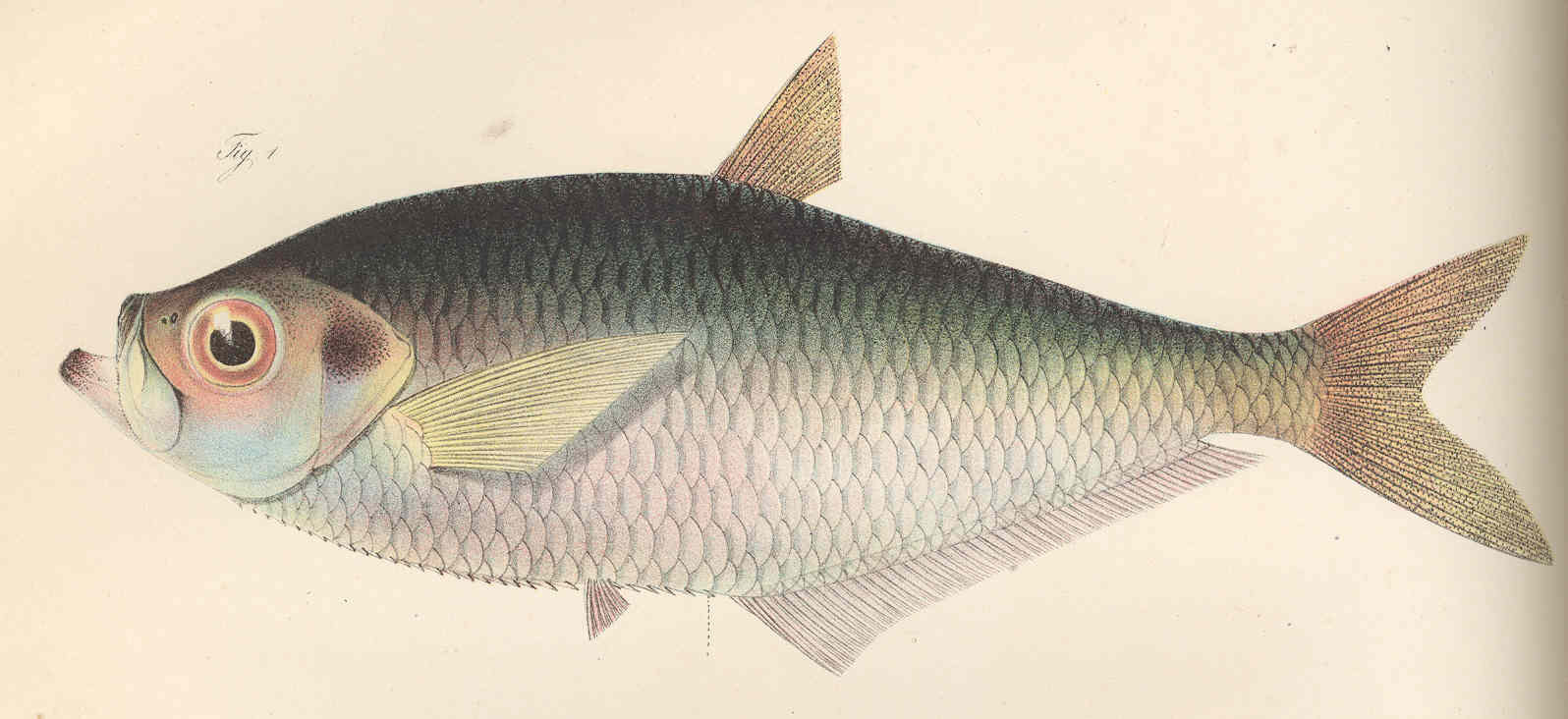

Conservation status
- Least Concern (IUCN 3.1)

Scientific classification
- Kingdom: Animalia
- Phylum: Chordata
- Class: Actinopterygii
- Order: Clupeiformes
- Family: Pristigasteridae
- Genus: Ilisha
- Species: I. africana

Binomial name
- Ilisha africana Bloch, 1795

Synonyms
- Clupea africana Bloch, 1795; Clupanodon africanus (Bloch, 1795); Pellona africana (Bloch, 1795); Pellona iserti Valenciennes, 1847; Pellona gabonica Duméril, 1861; Pristigaster dolloi Boulenger, 1902; Ilisha dolloi (Boulenger, 1902); Ilisha melanota Derscheid, 1924

= Ilisha africana =

West African ilisha

Species of ray-finned fish

Ilisha africana, called the West African ilisha or African ilisha, is a species of longfin herring native to the coasts, lagoons and estuaries of western Africa from Senegal to Angola. It is a marine species that is tolerant of brackish water. The species is commercially fished.

== Taxonomy ==
Ilisha africana was first described by Marcus Elieser Bloch in 1795. It is classified in the family Pristigasteridae (the longfin herrings) in the class Actinopterygii. It has been referred to by several synonyms, such as Clupea africana, Clupanodon africanus, Pellona africana, Pellona iserti, Pellona gabonica, Pristigaster dolloi, Ilisha dolloi, and Ilisha melanota.

== Description ==
Averaging 13–18 centimetres in length, I. africana can reach a size of 30 cm and 144 grams. It has large eyes with an upward-pointing mouth. Its dorsal fin is positioned at or before the body's midpoint, with 14–17 soft rays. The anal fin is distinctively long, with 45–50 soft rays, and the body has an array of scutes.

== Ecology ==
I. africana is found on the west African coast from Mauritania and Senegal in the north to Angola in the south. It is common in most of its range, especially in coastal Republic of the Congo, though less abundant at its northern edges, and can be found year-round. Inhabiting marine neritic and intertidal zones within 25 metres of the surface, it is very tolerant of brackish water and occurs in estuaries to nearly freshwater zones. It preys on shrimps, small fishes, and planktonic crustaceans.

Though there is some evidence that I. africana populations may be in decline in portions of its range, its population is largely stable, and it is assessed as a least concern species on the IUCN Red List.

== Commercial fishing ==
I. africana is commercially fished via seine fishing, gillnetting, and trawling. It is used in fishmeal in addition to being sold fresh and frozen. It is frequently caught inadvertently by shrimp fishers; a 2002 study found that I. africana comprised over 8% of shrimp trawling bycatch in Nigeria.
