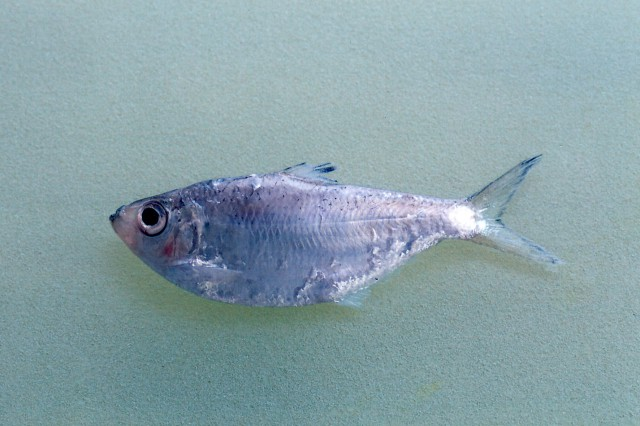

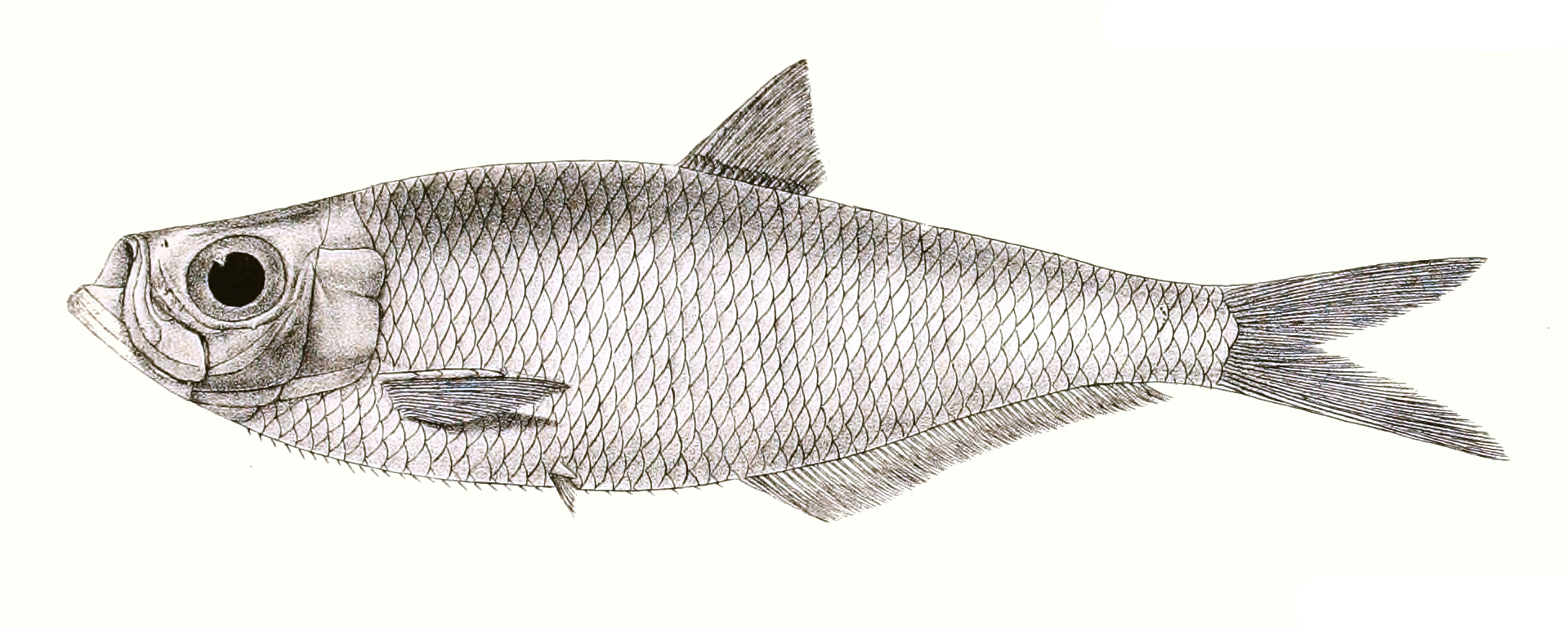

Conservation status
- Least Concern (IUCN 3.1)

Scientific classification
- Kingdom: Animalia
- Phylum: Chordata
- Class: Actinopterygii
- Order: Clupeiformes
- Family: Pristigasteridae
- Genus: Ilisha
- Species: I. megaloptera

Binomial name
- Ilisha megaloptera (Swainson, 1839)

Synonyms
- Clupea megalopterus Swainson, 1838; Pellona megaloptera (Swainson, 1838); Clupanodon motius Hamilton, 1822; Ilisha motius (Hamilton, 1822); Platygaster macropthalma Swainson, 1838; Clupea parva Swainson, 1839; Pellona dussumieri Valenciennes, 1847; Ilisha dussumieri (Valenciennes, 1847); Pellona russellii Bleeker, 1852

= Ilisha megaloptera =

Species of ray-finned fish

Ilisha megaloptera, the bigeye ilisha, is a species of ray-finned fish in the family Pristigasteridae. It occurs in the tropical Indo-Pacific region, in coastal waters, estuaries and the tidal parts of rivers.
