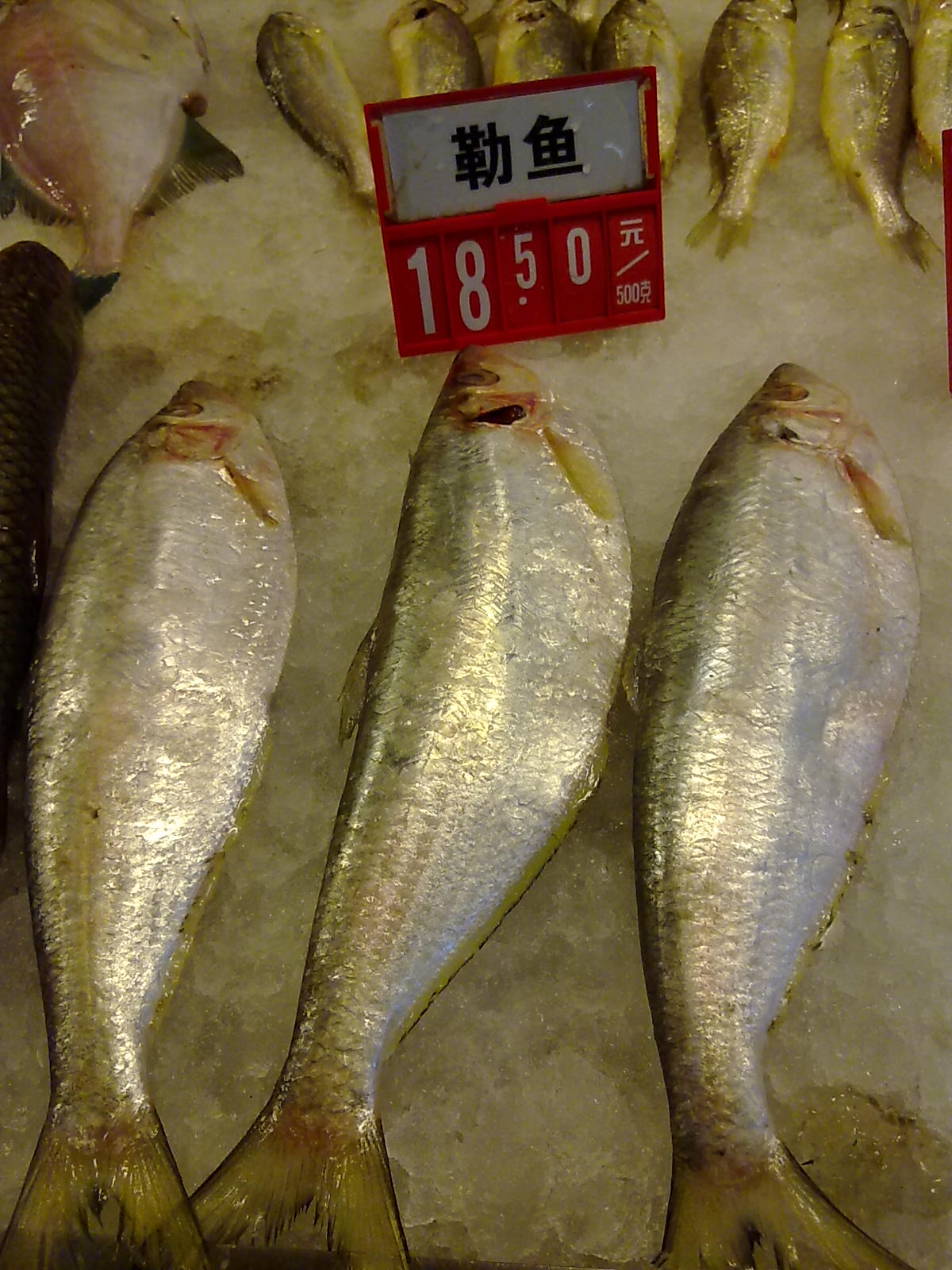
- Ilisha elongata

Scientific classification
- Kingdom: Animalia
- Phylum: Chordata
- Class: Actinopterygii
- Order: Clupeiformes
- Family: Pristigasteridae
- Genus: Ilisha; J. Richardson, 1846

Type species
- Ilisha abnormis J. Richardson, 1846

Species
- See text

Synonyms
- Platygaster Swainson, 1838; Pseudochirocentrodon Miranda Ribeiro, 1920

= Ilisha =

Genus of ray-finned fishes

Ilisha is a genus of ray-finned fishes in the family Pristigasteridae, containing 16 species. It is similar to Pellona but lacks a toothed hypo-maxilla. The genus has a worldwide distribution in tropical and subtropical coastal waters and estuaries. Some species also enter rivers, with I. amazonica and I. novacula being largely – if not entirely – restricted to tropical rivers.

== Fisheries ==
Two Ilisha species are individually reported in the FAO catch statistics: Ilisha elongata off coasts of China and Korea and Ilisha africana off West African coasts. Other species may be reported as simply clupeoids.

== Species ==
There are currently 16 recognized species in this genus:

- Ilisha africana (Bloch, 1795) (West African ilisha)
- Ilisha amazonica (A. Miranda-Ribeiro, 1920) (Amazon ilisha)
- Ilisha compressa J. E. Randall, 1994
- Ilisha elongata (Anonymous (referred to E. T. Bennett), 1830) (Elongate ilisha)
- Ilisha filigera (Valenciennes, 1847) (Coromandel ilisha)
- Ilisha fuerthii (Steindachner, 1875) (Pacific ilisha)
- Ilisha kampeni (M. C. W. Weber & de Beaufort, 1913) (Kampen's ilisha)
- Ilisha lunula Kailola, 1986 (Longtail ilisha)
- Ilisha macrogaster Bleeker, 1866 (Kalimantan ilisha)
- Ilisha megaloptera (Swainson, 1839) (Bigeye ilisha)
- Ilisha melastoma (Bloch & J. G. Schneider, 1801) (Indian ilisha)
- Ilisha novacula (Valenciennes, 1847) (Burmese River ilisha)
- Ilisha obfuscata Wongratana, 1983 (Hidden ilisha)
- Ilisha pristigastroides (Bleeker, 1852) (Javan ilisha)
- Ilisha sirishai Seshagiri Rao, 1975 (Lobejaw ilisha)
- Ilisha striatula Wongratana, 1983 (Banded ilisha)
