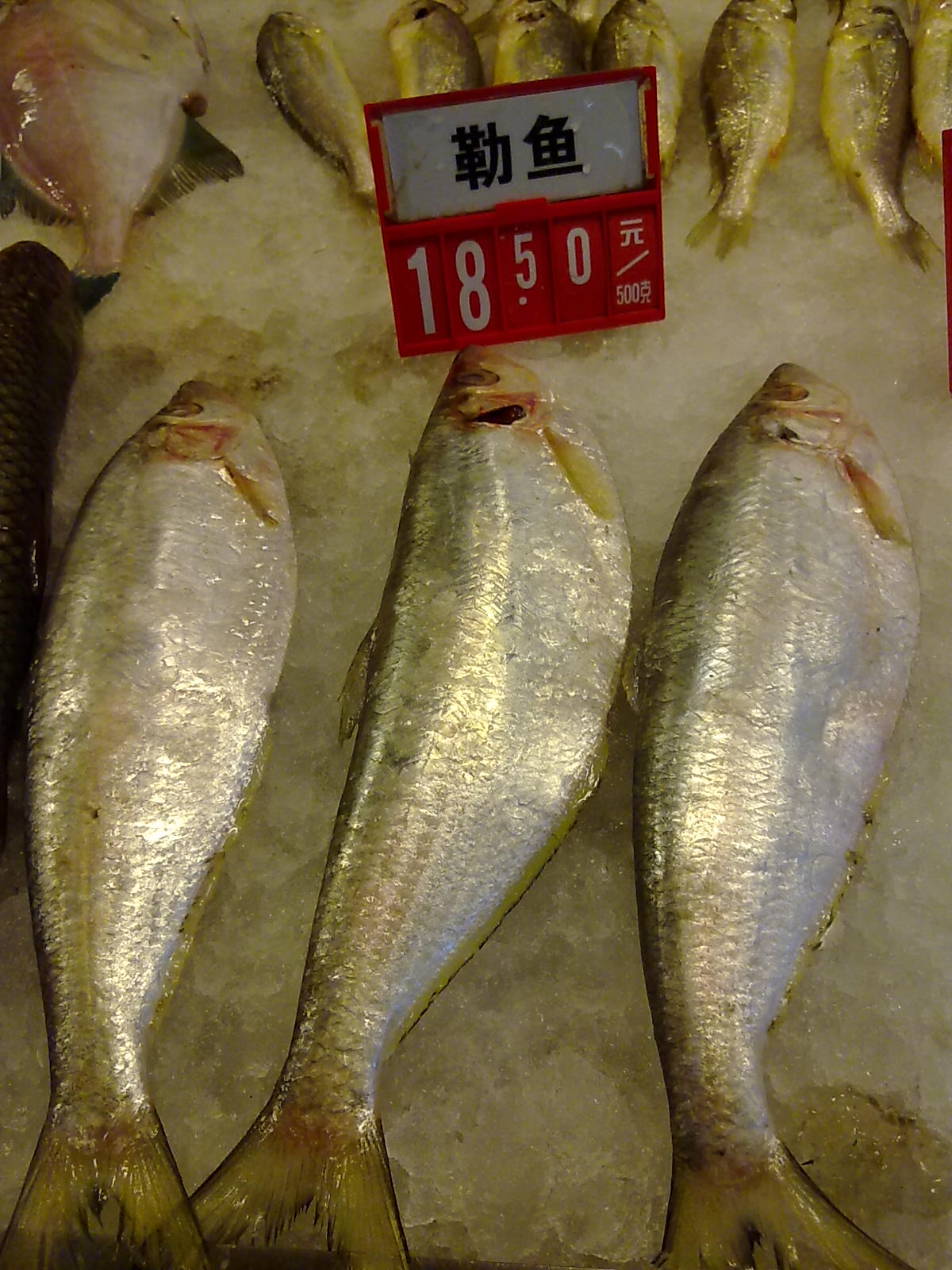
- Elongate ilisha on sale in a Chinese supermarket

Conservation status
- Least Concern (IUCN 3.1)

Scientific classification
- Kingdom: Animalia
- Phylum: Chordata
- Class: Actinopterygii
- Order: Clupeiformes
- Family: Pristigasteridae
- Genus: Ilisha
- Species: I. elongata

Binomial name
- Ilisha elongata Bennett, 1830

Synonyms
- Pellona elongata Bennett, 1830; Ilisha abnormis Richardson, 1846; Ilisha affinis (Gray, 1830)

= Ilisha elongata =

Elongate ilisha

Species of ray-finned fish

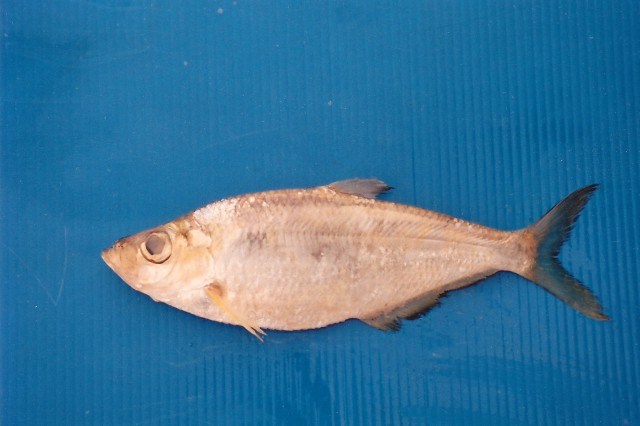
Ilisha elongata

The elongate ilisha (Ilisha elongata), also known as the Chinese herring (simplified Chinese: 勒鱼; traditional Chinese: 勒魚; pinyin: lèyú, or simply 鳓; 鰳; lè) or slender shad (although not a true herring or shad), is a species of longfin herring native to the coastal waters and estuaries of North Indian Ocean and Northwest Pacific. It is a relatively large species, up to 45–60 centimetres (18–24 in) in total length. It is an important fishery species.

== Life history ==
In the northern part of its range, Ilisha elongata matures at age of 2 years and has a lifespan of about 6 years; in the warmer parts of its range, it matures under age 1 year and has a lifespan of about 3 years. It can spawn several batches of eggs.

== Fisheries and use ==
The species is commercially fished. Based on the FAO fishery statistics, the annual catches ranged between 80,400 and 98,700 tonnes in 2000–2009, all of them from the Northwest Pacific (FAO Fishing Area 61) and almost all of them caught by China.
