= Pellona harroweri =

American coastal pellona

Scientific classification
- Domain: Eukaryota
- Kingdom: Animalia
- Phylum: Chordata
- Class: Actinopterygii
- Order: Clupeiformes
- Family: Pristigasteridae
- Genus: Pellona
- Species: P. harroweri

Binomial name
- Pellona harroweri Fowler, 1917

Synonyms
- Ilisha argentata Meek & Hildebrand, 1923; Ilisha harroweri Fowler, 1917; Ilisha narragansetae Fowler, 1911; Neosteus mayrinki Pinto, 1972; Neosteus ternetzi Norman, 1923; Pristigaster vanderbilti Borodin, 1928

Species of ray-finned fish

Pellona harroweri, called the American coastal pellona and the caille, is a species of longfin herring native to the beaches and estuaries of the western Atlantic from Panama to southern Brazil. Some individuals can reach 18 cm, with the average closer to 12 cm. They school in very shallow waters, and are rarely found deeper than 16 m.

The species is considered a forage fish, used for bait for commercial fish and consumed by humans on a subsistence level. They are eaten by the Costero dolphin, and by the La Plata dolphin.
