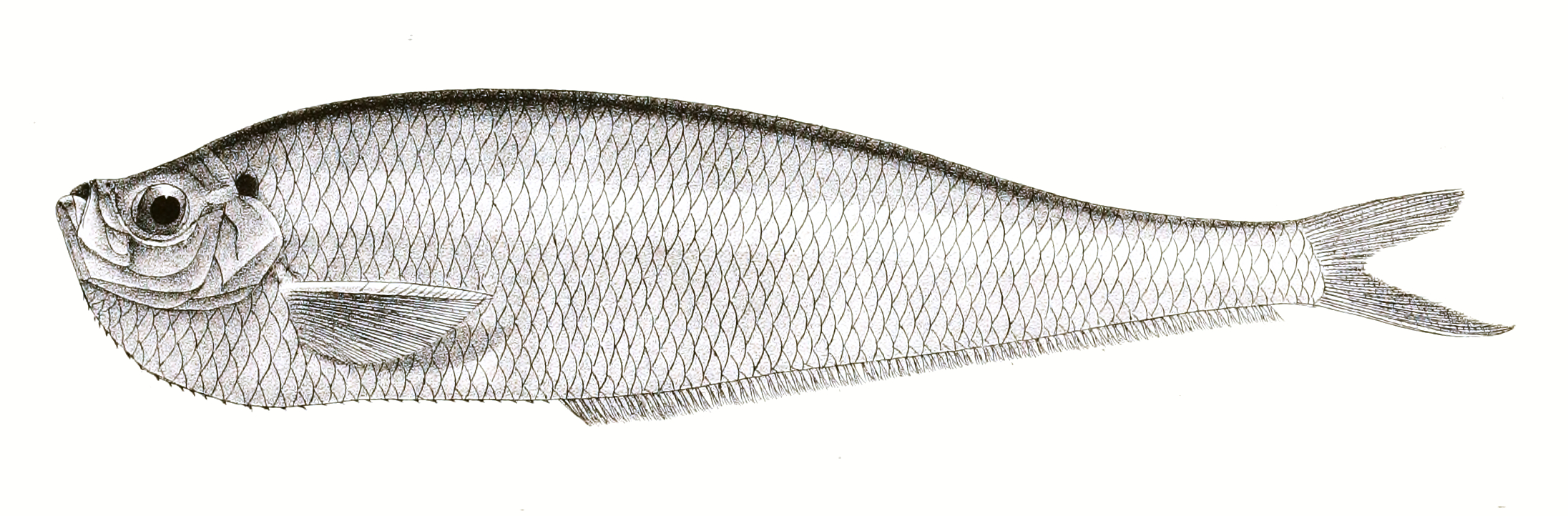

Conservation status
- Least Concern (IUCN 3.1)

Scientific classification
- Kingdom: Animalia
- Phylum: Chordata
- Class: Actinopterygii
- Order: Clupeiformes
- Family: Pristigasteridae
- Genus: Raconda; J. E. Gray, 1831
- Species: R. russeliana

Binomial name
- Raconda russeliana J. E. Gray, 1831

Synonyms
- Apterygia ramcarata J. E. Gray, 1835; Apterygia hamiltoni Valenciennes, 1847

= Raconda =

Genus of ray-finned fishes

Raconda is a monospecific genus of marine ray-finned fish belonging to the family Pristigasteridae, the longfin herrings. The only species in the genus is Raconda russeliana, the raconda, a species found in the eastern Indian Ocean and far western Pacific Ocean.
