= Odontognathus =

Scientific classification
- Kingdom: Animalia
- Phylum: Chordata
- Class: Actinopterygii
- Order: Clupeiformes
- Family: Pristigasteridae
- Genus: Odontognathus; Lacépède, 1800

Type species
- Odontognathus mucronatus Lacépède, 1800

Genus of ray-finned fishes

Odontognathus is a genus of longfin herrings in the family Pristigasteridae. Currently, three species are recognized for this genus, all of which are restricted to tropical waters of the Western Hemisphere.

== Species ==
- Odontognathus compressus Meek & Hildebrand, 1923 (Caribbean longfin herring)
- Odontognathus mucronatus Lacépède, 1800 (Guiana longfin herring)
- Odontognathus panamensis (Steindachner, 1876) (Panama longfin herring)
