= Gasteropelecus levis =

Conservation status
- Least Concern (IUCN 3.1)

Scientific classification
- Kingdom: Animalia
- Phylum: Chordata
- Class: Actinopterygii
- Order: Characiformes
- Family: Gasteropelecidae
- Genus: Gasteropelecus
- Species: G. levis

Binomial name
- Gasteropelecus levis (C. H. Eigenmann, 1909)

Synonyms
- Pterodiscus levis C. H. Eigenmann, 1909

Species of fish

Gasteropelecus levis, the silver hatchetfish, is a species of freshwater ray-finned fish belonging to the family Gasteropelecidae, the freshwater hatchetfishes. It is a relatively small fish that is often kept in aquariums. It is compressed laterally, with black and gold lines running along its side. Adults will grow up to 3.5 cm in the wild and 6 cm in the aquarium.

== See also ==
- List of freshwater aquarium fish species
