= Opisthopterus =

Scientific classification
- Kingdom: Animalia
- Phylum: Chordata
- Class: Actinopterygii
- Division: Teleostei
- Order: Clupeiformes
- Family: Pristigasteridae
- Genus: Opisthopterus; T. N. Gill, 1861

Type species
- Pristigaster tartoor (a synonym of Opisthopterus tardoore Cuvier, 1829) Valenciennes, 1847

Species
- See text

Genus of ray-finned fishes

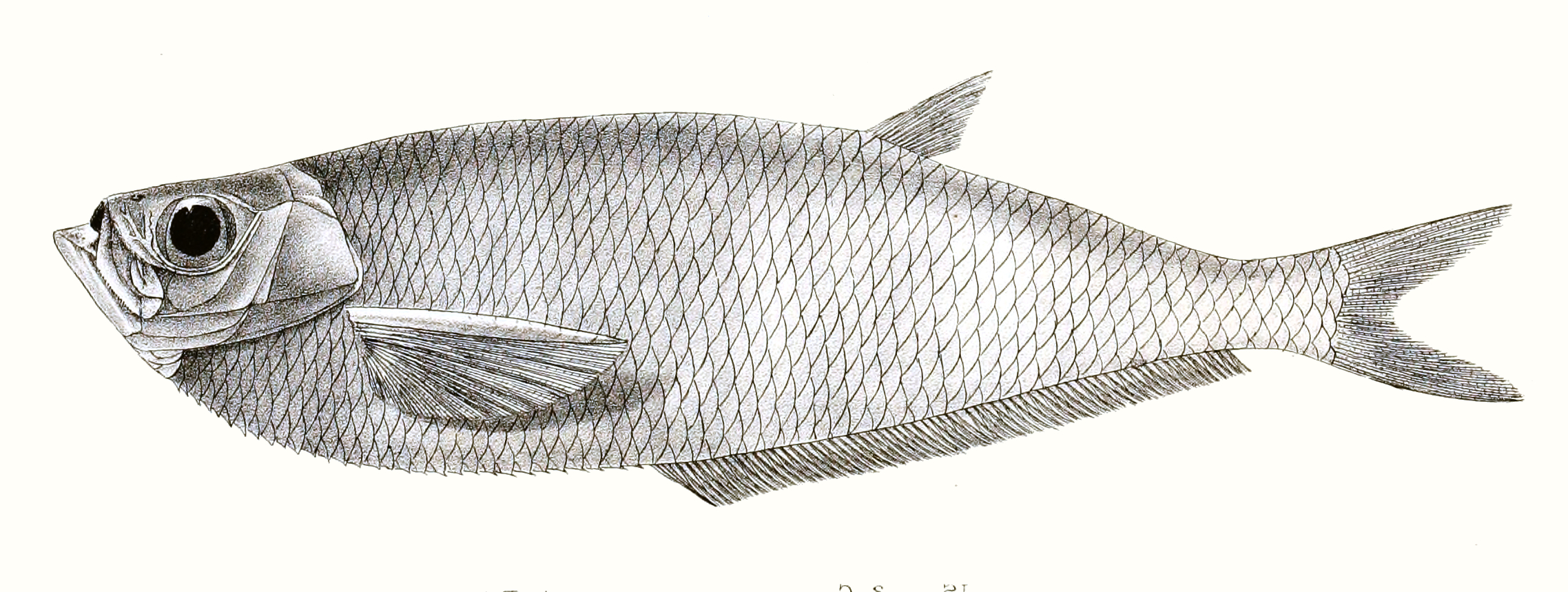
Sketch of the Opisthopterus Tartoor

Opisthopterus is a genus of longfin herring in the family Pristigasteridae. There are currently six species in this genus. They are found in Indo-Pacific.

== Species ==
- Opisthopterus dovii (Günther, 1868) (Dove's longfin herring)
- Opisthopterus effulgens (Regan, 1903) (Vaqueira longfin herring)
- Opisthopterus equatorialis Hildebrand, 1946 (Equatorial longfin herring)
- Opisthopterus macrops (Günther, 1867) (Bigeyed longfin herring)
- Opisthopterus tardoore (Cuvier, 1829) (Tardoore)
- Opisthopterus valenciennesi Bleeker, 1872 (Slender tardoor)
