= Neoopisthopterus =

Scientific classification
- Kingdom: Animalia
- Phylum: Chordata
- Class: Actinopterygii
- Order: Clupeiformes
- Family: Pristigasteridae
- Genus: Neoopisthopterus; Hildebrand, 1948

Type species
- Odontognathus tropicus Hildebrand, 1946

Genus of ray-finned fishes

Neoopisthopterus is a small genus of ray-finned fish in the family Pristigasteridae. There are currently two recognized species in this genus, both of which occur in tropical waters of the Western Hemisphere.

== Species ==
- Neoopisthopterus cubanus Hildebrand, 1948 (Cuban longfin herring)
- Neoopisthopterus tropicus (Hildebrand, 1946) (Tropical longfin herring)
