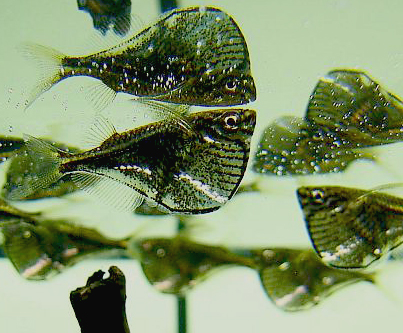

Conservation status
- Least Concern (IUCN 3.1)

Scientific classification
- Kingdom: Animalia
- Phylum: Chordata
- Class: Actinopterygii
- Order: Characiformes
- Family: Gasteropelecidae
- Genus: Carnegiella
- Species: C. marthae

Binomial name
- Carnegiella marthae G. S. Myers, 1927

= Black-winged hatchetfish =

Species of fish

The black-winged hatchetfish (Carnegiella marthae) is a species of freshwater ray-finned fish belonging to the family Gasteropelecidae, the freshwater hatchetfishes. This fish is found in South America.

George Myers named this fish after his first wife, Martha.

== Description ==
Black-winged hatchetfish has a convex body. It has a very deep ventral profile with its anal fin set back. This species has wing-like pectoral fins that often extend to half of the fish's body length. In general, coloration is silver with black patches and stripes, but colors may vary depending on the angle of light. A stripe that is usually gold stretches horizontally from the gill cover the base of the tail. Black-winged hatchetfish can reach up to 2.8 cm (1.1 in) in length.

== Distribution and habitat ==
Black-winged hatchetfish live in the calm streams and pools of the Orinoco and Negro region in South America. They can be found in Brazil and Venezuela.

== Diet ==
Black-winged hatchetfish are omnivorous. They can be fed live as well as flake foods. In the wild, they feed mainly at the surface for insects, but can also eat crustaceans.

== In the aquarium ==
Black-winged hatchetfish are peaceful fish that will do well with many other types of tropical fish, such as smaller species of catfish and tetras. Make sure that there are small floating plants. Cover every hole at the top of the aquarium because in the wild, hatchetfish catch insects by jumping out of the water. Blackwinged hatchetfish inhabit the top of the aquarium.

== See also ==
- Freshwater hatchetfish
