= Carnegiella schereri =

Conservation status
- Least Concern (IUCN 3.1)

Scientific classification
- Kingdom: Animalia
- Phylum: Chordata
- Class: Actinopterygii
- Order: Characiformes
- Family: Gasteropelecidae
- Genus: Carnegiella
- Species: C. schereri

Binomial name
- Carnegiella schereri Fernández-Yépez, 1950

Species of fish

Carnegiella schereri, is a species of freshwater ray-finned fish belonging to the family Gasteropelecidae, the freshwater hatchetfishes. This species is found in the Amazon Basin in Peru and Brazil. It is often sold for home aquariums as silver hatchetfish, dwarf hatchetfish, or Scherer's hatchetfish, and grows to about 2.6 centimeters (1 inch).

It is named in honor of William G. Scherer, an evangelical missionary at Pebas, Peru, who collected the type specimen and shared his collection of fishes from the Peruvian Amazon.
