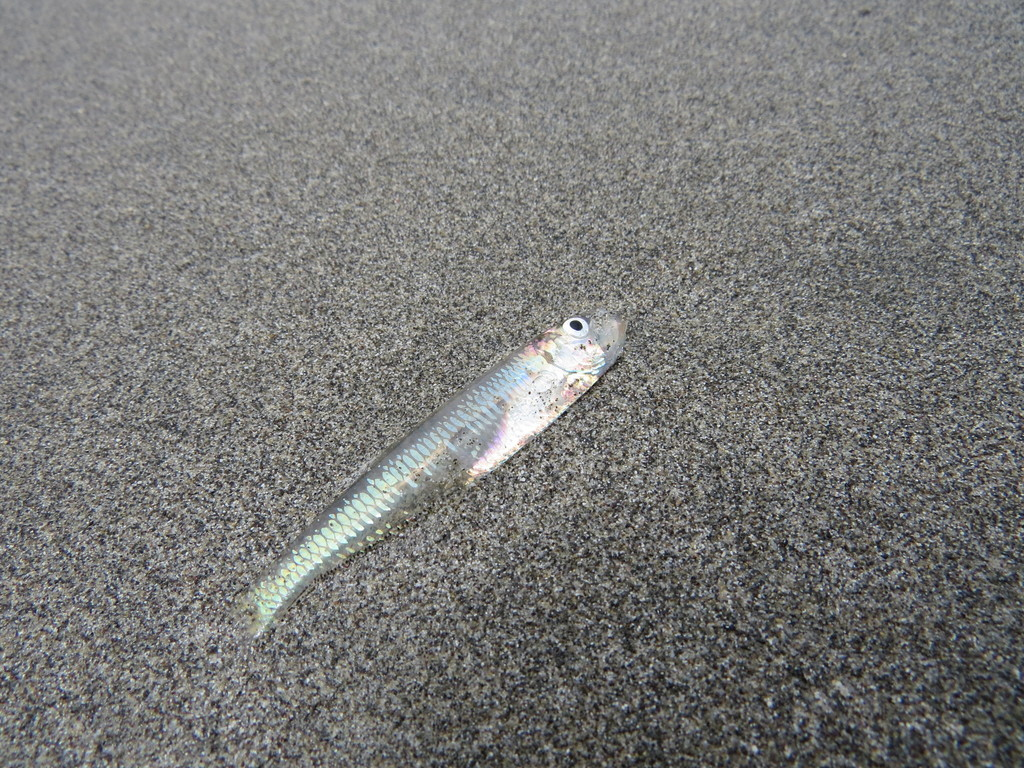

Conservation status
- Least Concern (IUCN 3.1)

Scientific classification
- Kingdom: Animalia
- Phylum: Chordata
- Class: Actinopterygii
- Division: Teleostei
- Order: Clupeiformes
- Family: Pristigasteridae
- Genus: Chirocentrodon; Günther, 1868
- Species: C. bleekerianus

Binomial name
- Chirocentrodon bleekerianus (Poey, 1867)

Synonyms
- Pellona bleekeriana Poey, 1867; Chirocentrodon taeniatus Günther, 1868; Ilisha caribbaea Meek & Hildebrand, 1923; Chirocentrodon cladileokae Tommasi, 1964

= Dogtooth herring =

Species of ray-finned fish

The dogtooth herring (Chirocentrodon bleekerianus) is a species of herring occurring in the Caribbean Sea and the Atlantic Ocean along the coast of northern South America, Central America and the Caribbean islands. The only species in its genus, the dogtooth herring commonly grows to around 3.5 inches (9 cm) in length.
