= Pliosteostoma =

Conservation status
- Least Concern (IUCN 3.1)

Scientific classification
- Kingdom: Animalia
- Phylum: Chordata
- Class: Actinopterygii
- Order: Clupeiformes
- Family: Pristigasteridae
- Genus: Pliosteostoma; Norman, 1923
- Species: P. lutipinnis

Binomial name
- Pliosteostoma lutipinnis (D. S. Jordan & C. H. Gilbert, 1882)

Synonyms
- Pristigaster lutipinnis D. S. Jordan & C. H. Gilbert, 1882; Ophisthopterus lutipinnis (D. S. Jordan & C. H. Gilbert, 1882)

Species of ray-finned fish

Pliosteostoma is a monospecific genus of marine ray-finned fish belonging to the family Pristigasteridae, the longfin herrings. The only species in the genus is Pliosteostoma lutipinnis, the yellowfin herring, a species found along the Pacific coast of Central and South America between Mexico and Ecuador.
