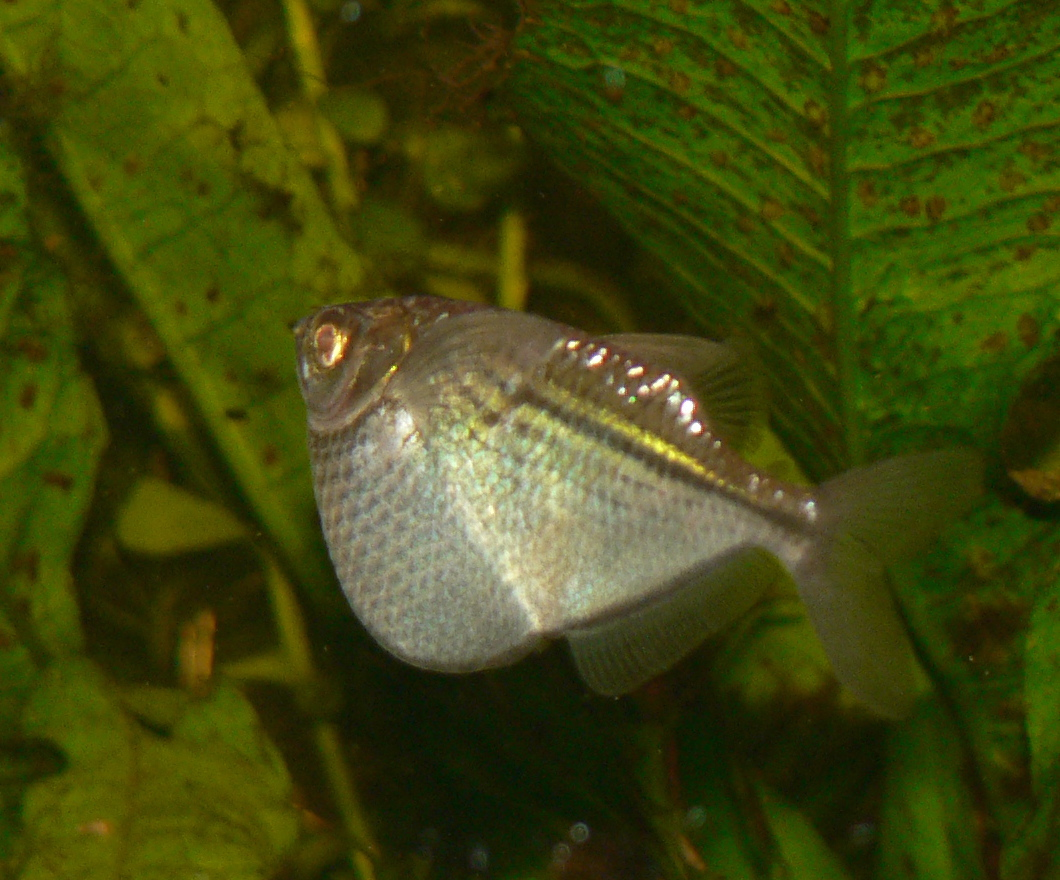
- Gasteropelecus sternicla

Conservation status
- Least Concern (IUCN 3.1)

Scientific classification
- Kingdom: Animalia
- Phylum: Chordata
- Class: Actinopterygii
- Division: Teleostei
- Order: Characiformes
- Family: Gasteropelecidae
- Genus: Gasteropelecus
- Species: G. sternicla

Binomial name
- Gasteropelecus sternicla (Linnaeus, 1758)

Synonyms
- Clupea sternicla Linnaeus, 1758; Salmo gasteropelecus Pallas, 1770; Gasteropelecus argenteus Lacépède, 1803; Gasteropelecus coronatus W. R. Allen, 1942; Gasteropelecus sternicla marowini Hoedeman, 1952; Gasteropelecus sternicla morae Hoedeman, 1952

= Common hatchetfish =

Species of fish

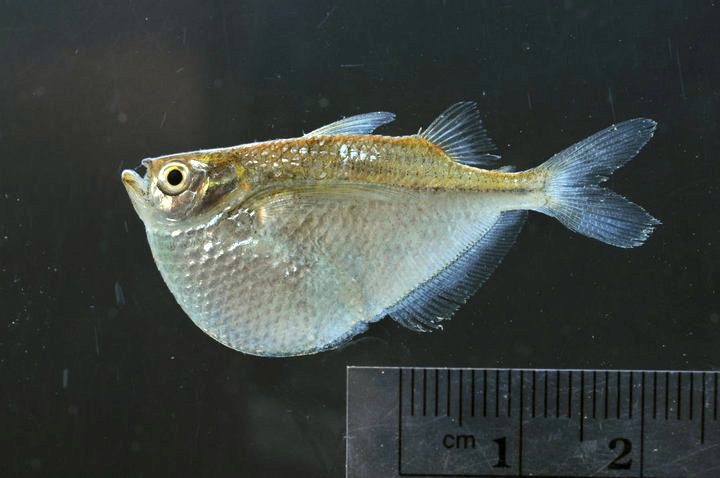
Cuyuni fish (Gasteropelecus sternicula) of Guyana

The common hatchetfish or river hatchetfish (Gasteropelecus sternicla) is a species of freshwater ray-finned fish belonging to the family Gasteropelecidae, the freshwater hatchetfish. This fish occurs in South America where it is found in the drainage basins of the Amazon, Orinoco, Essequibo, Tocantins-Araguaia, Mearim, upper Paraguay river basins, and in the coastal drainages in Guianas. It has been recorded from Bolivia. Brazil, Colombia, Ecuador, French Guiana, Guyana, Peru, Suriname and Trinidad.

== See also ==
- List of freshwater aquarium fish species
