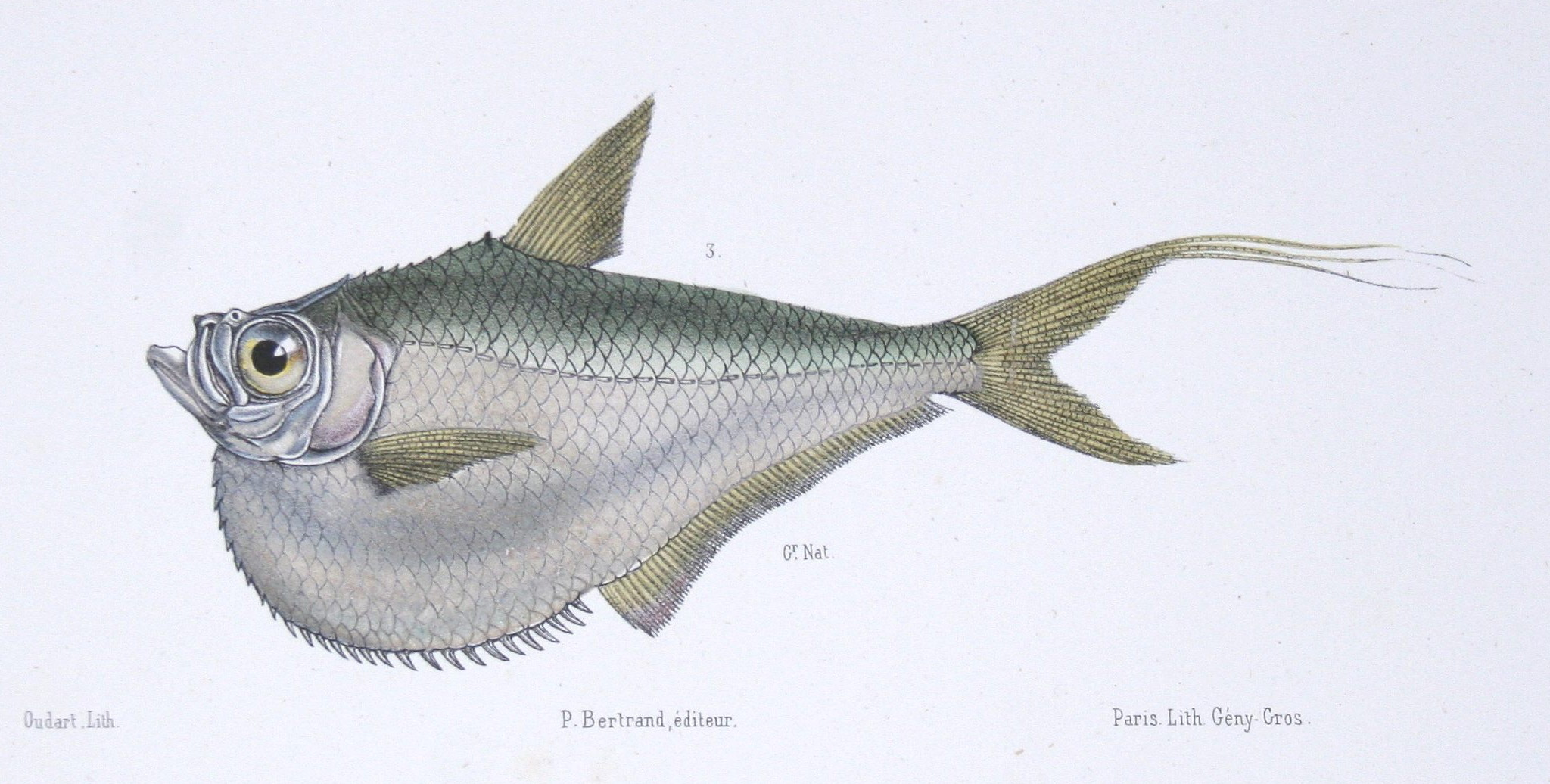
- Pristigaster cayana

Scientific classification
- Kingdom: Animalia
- Phylum: Chordata
- Class: Actinopterygii
- Order: Clupeiformes
- Family: Pristigasteridae
- Genus: Pristigaster; Cuvier, 1816

Type species
- Pristigaster cayanus Cuvier, 1829

= Pristigaster =

Genus of ray-finned fishes

Pristigaster is a small genus of ray-finned fish belonging to the family Pristigasteridae. It contains two species, both restricted to the Amazon Basin in South America.

== Species ==
- Pristigaster cayana Cuvier, 1829 (Amazon hatchet herring)
- Pristigaster whiteheadi Menezes & de Pinna, 2000
