= Carnegiella myersi =

Conservation status
- Least Concern (IUCN 3.1)

Scientific classification
- Kingdom: Animalia
- Phylum: Chordata
- Class: Actinopterygii
- Order: Characiformes
- Family: Gasteropelecidae
- Genus: Carnegiella
- Species: C. myersi

Binomial name
- Carnegiella myersi Fernández-Yépez, 1950

Species of fish

Carnegiella myersi, the pygmy hatchetfish, is a species of freshwater ray-finned fish belonging to the family Gasteropelecidae, the freshwater hatchetfishes. This fish is found in streams of the upper Amazon basin in Bolivia Brazil, Colombia, Ecuador and Peru.

It is named for ichthyologist George S. Myers (1905–1985) of Stanford University, because of his contributions towards expanding the knowledge of South American fishes.

== Size ==
The pygmy hatchetfish grows to about 2.2 centimeters, or 0.9 inches.

== In the aquarium ==
Pygmy hatchetfish are peaceful fish that do well in a community tank.
