= Jean-Marie Derscheid =

Belgian zoologist (1901–1944)

Jean-Marie Derscheid

Jean-Marie Eugène Derscheid (19 May 1901, Sterrebeek – 13 March 1944) was a Belgian zoologist who focused much of his professional interest on Africa. He was a world expert on breeding exotic waterfowl in captivity, authored scientific articles on a wide range of wildlife species, became the initial director of Africa's first national park and gathered an important historical manuscript collection on Rwandan history

Professor Derscheid was European secretary for the International Committee for Bird Protection and was awarded the medal of the Société d’Acclimatation de France. He was a Fellow of the Zoological Society of London and of the U.S. National Audubon Society, a corresponding fellow of the American Ornithologists' Union, an honorable life member of the Wildlife Preservation Society of Australia and member of the Avicultural Society (U.K.).

As a young man, during World War I, he joined the Belgian Army, only to be apprehended in 1918 while attempting to join the fighting near Ypres and imprisoned by the German Army at Hasselt Prison until the Armistice. He was awarded the Croix civique de 1ère classe avec liséré d'or for his service. During World War II, he served in the Belgian Resistance as a leader with the Comet line, which was organized to help Allied soldiers and airmen escape German-occupied Europe and return to Great Britain. He was (again) captured, this time by Nazi Germany's Geheime Feldpolizei (GFP or Secret Field Police) in October 1941, sent to a series of prisons and concentration camps and ultimately executed as a spy on 13 March 1944.

== From aviculture to zoology ==
From a young age on his family estate in Sterrebeek, Derscheid developed an interest in ornithology and aviculture. He built a research station for bird behavior called Armendy Farm that was active in the 1930s. In cooperation with colleagues in France, England, Germany, the United States and Australia he succeeded in assembling one of the best captive breeding bird collections in Europe, specializing in Anatidae and Loriinae (ducks, swans, geese; and the group of small parrots consisting of lories and lorikeets). Derscheid also kept the omnivorous alpine parrots from New Zealand known as keas. There, he researched dietary requirements and incubation, sending specimens to zoos throughout Europe, America, and Australia. He was particularly interested in aspergillosis, a bronchial disease caused by mold that decimated flocks of wild sea ducks as he tried to acclimatize them to the freshwater park environment, but which Derscheid succeeded in curing. Derscheid's techniques were widely adopted and applied, most notably at the nature reserve in Zwin (Belgium), known for its collections of salt-resistant plants and an aviary specializing in wading birds. An obituary of Derscheid states: “His collection at Sterrebeek was known throughout Europe, America and Australasia, and his success with the Anatidae, particularly with the sea-duck, placed him in the forefront of waterfowl experts.” Prior to the outbreak of World War II, Derscheid transferred some of his collection of exotic birds to the late John J. Yealland, who carried them in a cardboard box on one of the last boats to leave Belgium before the German invasion. Later the Curator of Birds at the London Zoo, Yealland also published on Derscheid's bird collections from notes prepared during the latter's imprisonment.

From 1919 to 1922 Derscheid was enrolled in the Science Faculty of the Université libre de Bruxelles, studying under Professor Auguste Lameere and earning a doctorate in Zoology based on his dissertation on the morphology of bird skulls (Morphologie du squelette céphalique des oiseaux). He was awarded the gold medal of the Concours Interuniversitaire (1922–1924) for his thesis on bird classification as well as another on the olfactory organs of fish. His first professional job was as temporary section head at the Royal Museum for Central Africa in Tervuren, Belgium (1924–1926). Most of Derscheid's scientific articles were published during this period, including those on the longfin herring (Ilisha africana), hornbill, okapi, and African wild dog. He continued to publish on a wide range of topics after this period, including articles on the tropicbird, dugong, exotic ducks and the mountain gorilla. He also published on his experiences with the Akeley expedition, including on ethnic groups in the region of the expedition and the new park.

== Conservation efforts in Europe and internationally ==
Early 20th-century European efforts to lobby internationally for environmental conservation laws were delayed by World War I, but Belgian biologist Jean Massart reintroduced Paul Sarasin's proposals at the International Union of Biological Sciences (IUBS) in the 1920s. Professor Michel Siedliecki promoted them in Poland and helped to get the issue onto the agenda of the IUBS meetings of 1925, 1926, 1927 and 1928. In 1927 Siedliecki, Derscheid and P.-G. Van Tienhoven of The Netherlands created the International Office for the Protection of Nature (Centre international de documentation et de correlation pour la protection de la nature) to implement wildlife conservation plans in Europe. Van Tienhoven was the first president, while Jean-Marie Derscheid was named secretary and managed the office until he resigned in 1933. That same year, Derscheid wrote a book about their experiences introducing laws for bird conservation.

== Africa's first national park and the Akeley-Derscheid expedition ==
Through his understanding of the importance of habitat conservation for wildlife in Europe and his professional work on Congo at the museum in Tervuren, Derscheid became an instrumental figure in lobbying for the creation of the first national park in Africa, royally decreed in 1925. He became known to Carl Akeley of the American Museum of Natural History through his cartographic work revising the best available maps of the mountain gorilla habitat in the Virunga Mountains border region of Rwanda, Uganda and Congo. This map documented the loss of forest habitat. Derscheid became a critic of colonial agricultural policy in Rwanda and Burundi, began raising funds and lobbying for the creation of a park to preserve gorilla habitat. He was appointed to accompany Akeley on the 1926-1927 expedition to Kivu, Belgian Congo that first mapped the area in detail and defined the borders of the Albert National Park (now Virunga National Park).

Carl Akeley died on 18 November 1926, only three days after the expedition arrived at Kabara, on the slope of the volcano Mount Mikeno. Derscheid undertook and completed many of the expedition's objectives after Akeley’s death: completing a topographical survey, attempting the first census of the mountain gorilla population in the area, conducting a general scientific survey and making recommendations for research sites. In 1928, he co-authored with Mary Jobe Akeley the final report and plan for the park’s administration to King Albert I of Belgium. She repeatedly refers to the expedition as the Akeley-Derscheid expedition in her book, although the financial backers of the expedition are named in the title. The Parc national Albert's administration was ceremonially inaugurated with a séance d'installation on 19 October 1929. It was placed under the authority of an Administrative Council with twenty-one members, with the Prince Albert de Ligne as president and Derscheid as secretary. A board was also created for which Jean-Marie Derscheid was named director.

From 1 January to 1 May 1930, the president and director undertook a second mission to the park in Congo to prepare for international collaboration and to research other areas of the colony in which new reserves could be established. In November and December 1930, Derscheid traveled to the United States, attending conferences at various institutions to promote the Albert National Park and its opportunities for scientific research as well as to generate financial support. He resigned in December 1933, after administrative conflicts arose over bookkeeping errors, and devoted himself to teaching biology at the Université coloniale at Antwerp, where he had been named Professor on 14 January 1930. Derscheid continued to pursue historical research on Rwanda and Eastern Congo until 1939, corresponding with colonial administrators stationed there and creating a research manuscripts collection.He was working at the university when war broke out again.

== World War II and resistance activities ==
In 1939, Derscheid was mobilized, rejoining his army medical corps unit in the 7th Infantry Division. After taking part in operations at Albert Canal, a defensive line, he was evacuated to France. There his unit was demobilized and in August 1940 he returned to Sterrebeek, where he found his family estate occupied by German soldiers, who treated the remains of his exotic duck collection as game.

Derscheid then contacted the resistance and established ties with a secret army unit, U.C.-L.-55, associated with the university in Antwerp, the reconnaissance services SRA (Service de Renseignements de l’Armée) and with the London authorities by the autumn of 1941. He directed a radio communications service with England using secret codes based on the Swahili and Lingala languages. He became a leader in the escape service known as the Comet line, a network of clandestine cells that assisted Allied soldiers and downed airmen to escape from German-occupied Belgium to unoccupied areas in France, Spain (Gibraltar) and Portugal. He participated with several such cells such as ABC, LLL, Portemine and organized Benoît. Several of the soldiers and airmen that he assisted in this way are documented in the Belgian Centre for Historical Research and Documentation on War and Contemporary Society archives (CEGES/SOMA), including Bernard "Bobby" Conville, Clifford L. Hallet, Roger Jules Jacques Verhulst and Allan Gillespie Cowan. However, along with others at the university, he came under suspicion and the Nazi secret police tried to force him to give himself up by imprisoning his wife, Jeanne Brasseur Derscheid (twice) and his parents as hostages at Saint-Gilles prison.

On 8 October 1941 he taught his last class; on the night of the 17th the GFP secret police arrested him in Brussels. He was extradited to Germany in January 1942 for what became thirty months in various prisons and concentration camps. A Japanese colleague, ornithologist Hatchisuka Masauji (who had accompanied him on one of his trips to Congo), used his influence with Emperor Hirohito to persuade the Germans to spare Derscheid's life. When the Nazi government recognized that it was losing the war, Jean-Marie Derscheid was decapitated on 13 March 1944 in Brandenburg-Görden Prison under the orders of Heinrich Himmler. Posthumously, he was granted the Political Prisoner Cross 1940-1945 and named Lieutenant in the S.R.A. He was recognized in citations by the President of the United States and from King George VI for the exceptional merit of his service.
