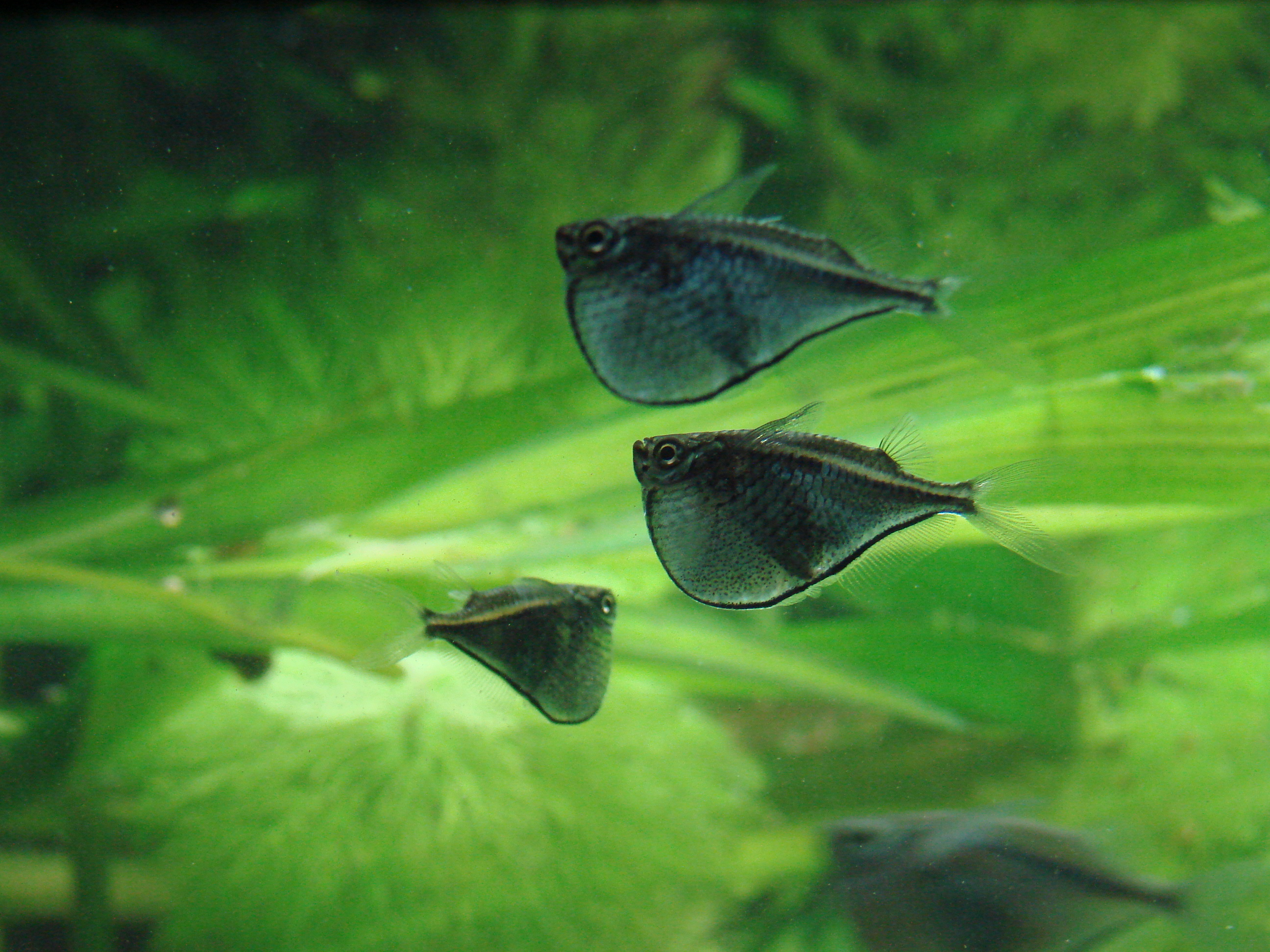

Conservation status
- Least Concern (IUCN 3.1)

Scientific classification
- Kingdom: Animalia
- Phylum: Chordata
- Class: Actinopterygii
- Division: Teleostei
- Order: Characiformes
- Family: Gasteropelecidae
- Genus: Thoracocharax
- Species: T. securis

Binomial name
- Thoracocharax securis (De Filippi, 1853)

Synonyms
- Gasteropelecus securis De Filippi, 1853; Gasteropelecus pectorosus Garman, 1890

= Thoracocharax securis =

Species of fish

Thoracocharax securis, the giant hatchetfish, is a species of freshwater ray-finned fish belonging to the family Gasteropelecidae, the freshwater hatchetfishes. This fish is found in the Amazon River Basin. Adults will grow up to 6.8 cm in the wild and 9 cm in the aquarium. It is a rarely seen species in the aquarium hobby. It is known to glide up to 2.74 m (9 ft 0 in) out of the water.
