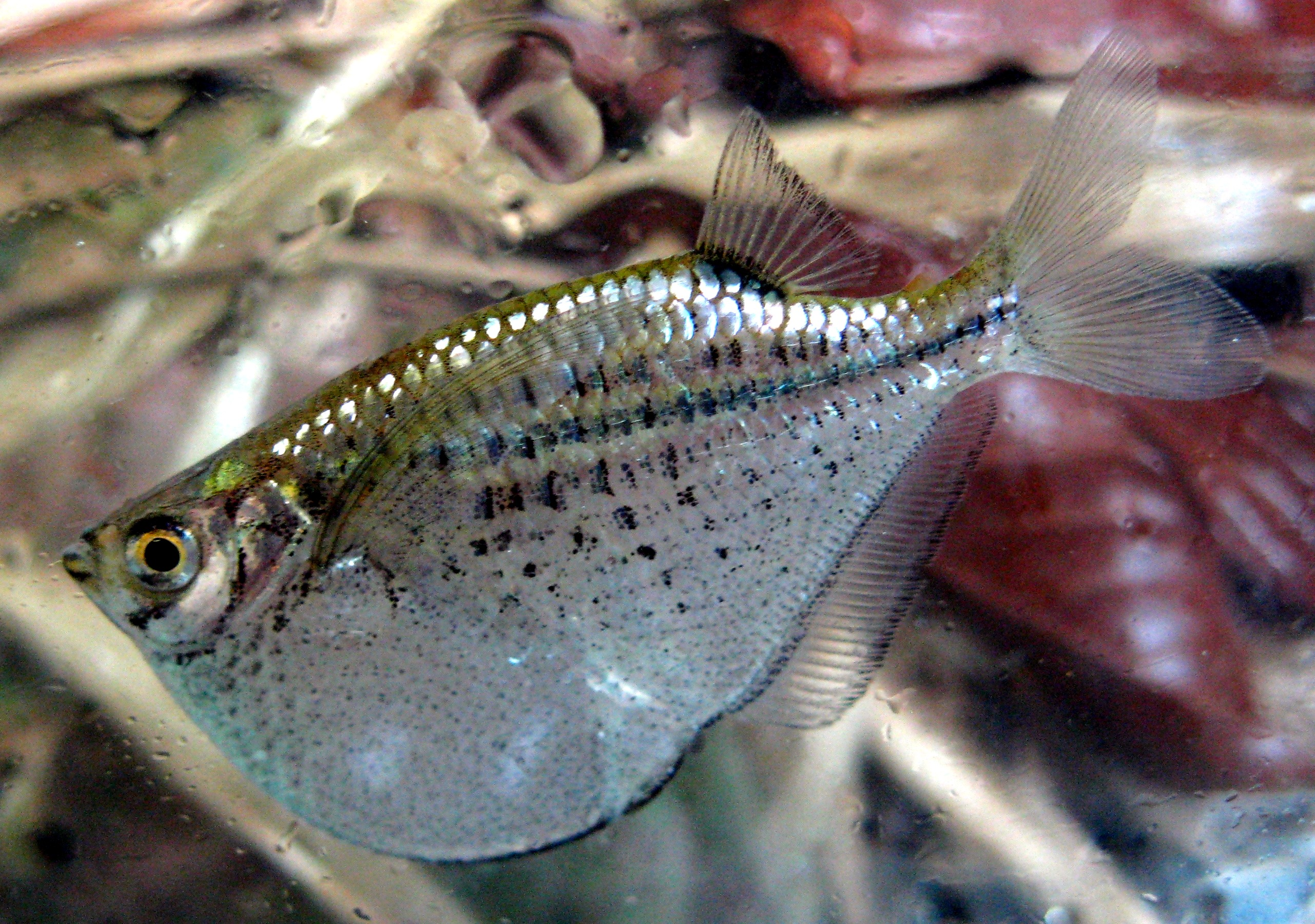
- Gasteropelecus maculatus

Scientific classification
- Kingdom: Animalia
- Phylum: Chordata
- Class: Actinopterygii
- Order: Characiformes
- Family: Gasteropelecidae
- Genus: Gasteropelecus; Scopoli, 1777

Type species
- Clupea sternicla Linnaeus, 1758

Synonyms
- Gastropelecys Agassiz, 1846; Pterodiscus C. H. Eigenmann, 1909

= Gasteropelecus =

Genus of fishes

Gasteropelecus is a genus of freshwater ray-finned fishes belonging to the family Gasteropelecidae, the freshwater hatchetfishes. The fishes in this genus are found in Central and South America.

== Species ==
Gasteropelecus contains the following valid species:

- Gasteropelecus levis (C. H. Eigenmann, 1909) (Silver hatchetfish)
- Gasteropelecus maculatus Steindachner, 1879 (Spotted hatchetfish)
- Gasteropelecus sternicla (Linnaeus, 1758) (River hatchetfish)
