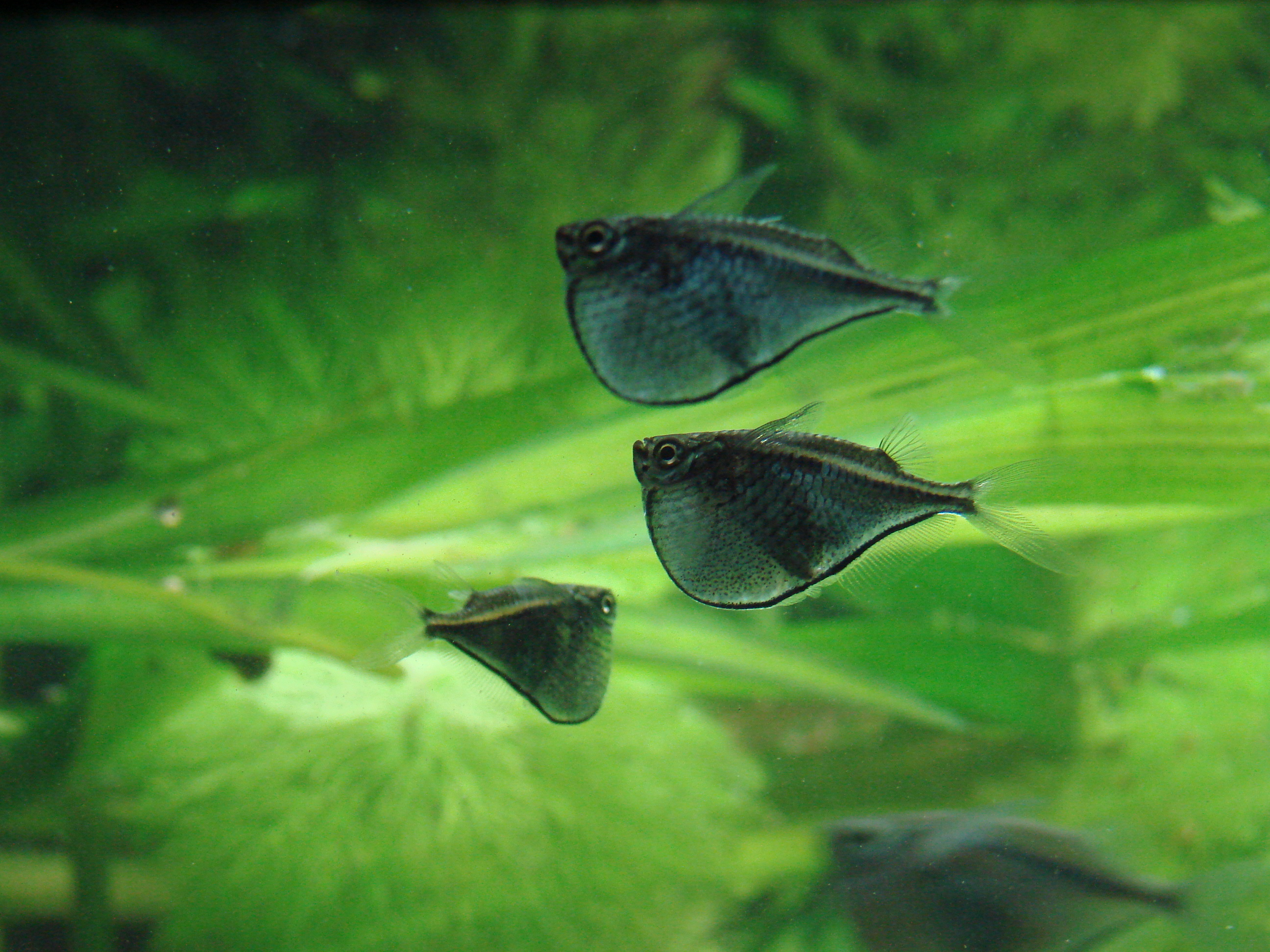
- Thoracocharax securis

Scientific classification
- Kingdom: Animalia
- Phylum: Chordata
- Class: Actinopterygii
- Order: Characiformes
- Family: Gasteropelecidae
- Genus: Thoracocharax; Fowler, 1907

Type species
- Gastropelecus stellatus Kner, 1858

= Thoracocharax =

Genus of fishes

Thoracocharax is a genus of freshwater ray-finned fishes belonging to the family Gasteropelecidae, the freshwater hatchetfishes. These fishes are found in the Amazon, Orinoco and Paraná basins in South America. These fish live just under the surface of the water.

== Species ==
Thoracocharax contains the following species:

- Thoracocharax securis (De Filippi, 1853) (Giant hatchetfish)
- Thoracocharax stellatus (Kner, 1858) (Spotfin hatchetfish)
