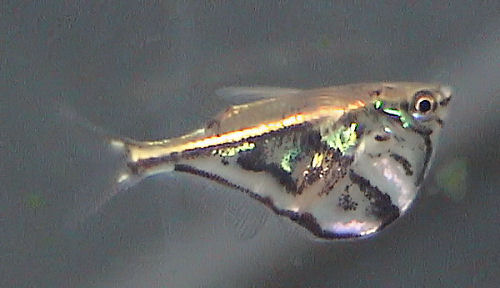
- Carnegiella strigata

Scientific classification
- Kingdom: Animalia
- Phylum: Chordata
- Class: Actinopterygii
- Order: Characiformes
- Family: Gasteropelecidae
- Genus: Carnegiella; C. H. Eigenmann, 1909

Type species
- Gasteropelecus strigatus Günther, 1864

= Carnegiella =

Genus of fishes

Carnegiella is a genus of freshwater ray-finned fishes belonging to the family Gasteropelecidae, the freshwater hatchetfishes. The fishes in this genus are found in the Amazon and Orinoco basins in South America. This genus contains some popular aquarium fishes.

== Species ==
Carnegiella contains the following valid species:

- Carnegiella marthae G. S. Myers, 1927 (Blackwing hatchetfish)
- Carnegiella myersi Fernández-Yépez, 1950 (Pygmy hatchetfish)
- Carnegiella schereri Fernández-Yépez, 1950 (Dwarf hatchetfish)
- Carnegiella strigata (Günther, 1864) (Marbled hatchetfish)
