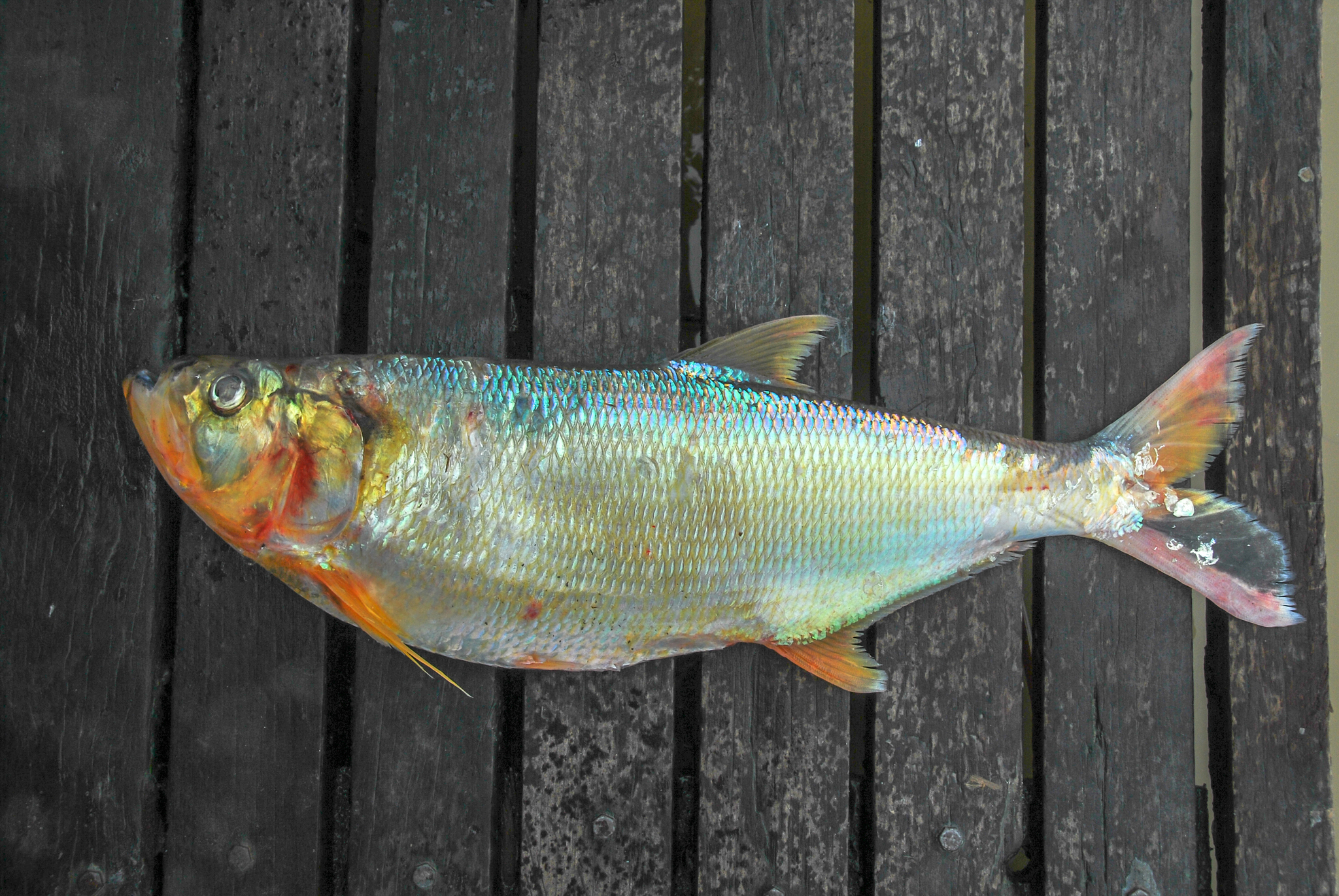
- Pellona castelnaeana

Scientific classification
- Kingdom: Animalia
- Phylum: Chordata
- Class: Actinopterygii
- Order: Clupeiformes
- Family: Pristigasteridae
- Genus: Pellona; Valenciennes, 1847

Type species
- Pellona orbignyana (a synonym of Pellona flavipinnis (Valenciennes, 1837)) Valenciennes, 1847

Species
- See text

= Pellona =

Genus of ray-finned fishes

Pellona is a genus of ray-finned fishes in the family Pristigasteridae. The genus contains six species. Three of these are restricted to freshwater habitats in tropical and subtropical South America, while P. dayi and P. ditchela are found in coastal waters of the Indo-Pacific, and P. harroweri is found in coastal Atlantic waters from Panama to Brazil.

== Species ==
Species	Common name	Image
Pellona altamazonica Cope, 1872		
Pellona castelnaeana Valenciennes, 1847	Amazon pellona	
Pellona dayi Wongratana, 1983	Day's pellona	
Pellona ditchela Valenciennes, 1847	Indian pellona	
Pellona flavipinnis (Valenciennes, 1837)	Yellowfin river pellona	
Pellona harroweri (Fowler, 1917)	American coastal pellona	
