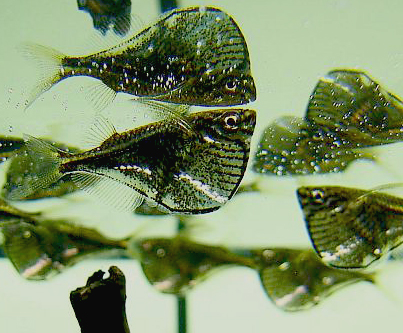
- Blackwinged hatchetfish (Carnegiella marthae)

Scientific classification
- Kingdom: Animalia
- Phylum: Chordata
- Class: Actinopterygii
- (unranked): Otophysi
- Order: Characiformes
- Suborder: Characoidei
- Family: Gasteropelecidae; Bleeker, 1859

Genera
- See text

= Gasteropelecidae =

Freshwater hatchetfish

Family of fishes

The freshwater hatchetfish are a family, Gasteropelecidae, of ray-finned fish from South and Central America. The common hatchetfish is the most popular member among fish keeping hobbyists. The family includes three genera: Carnegiella (four species), Gasteropelecus (three species), and Thoracocharax (two species).

== Distribution and habitat ==
Freshwater hatchetfish originate from Panama and South America (though they are absent from Chile). They tend to be an upper-level fish, often swimming directly below the surface of the water, biding their time patiently.

== Size ==
When fully grown, freshwater hatchetfish typically range in size from 1 to 2.5 inches (2.5 to 6.4 cm). One exception is the giant hatchetfish (Thoracocharax securis), which can grow up to 3.5 inches (8.9 cm). The smallest species are the pygmy hatchetfish (Carnegiella myersi), which only grows to about 0.9 inches (2.3 cm), and the dwarf hatchetfish (Carnegiella schereri), which grows to about 1 inch (2.5 cm).

== Flight ==
The most obvious trait of the freshwater hatchetfish is their enormously enlarged sternal region. This is accompanied by large pectoral fins and "extraordinarily powerful" associated muscles which account for up to one-quarter of their total body weight. "Quick beats of the pectoral fins" allow hatchetfish to "lift themselves half out of the water and glide along the surface ... Some species can even leave the water for short stretches." Because of this ability to fly and tendency to jump, aquaria used to keep hatchetfish should have a tightly sealed cover to prevent these fish from escaping.

== Genera ==
The genera in this family are:

- Carnegiella C. H. Eigenmann, 1909
- Gasteropelecus Scopoli, 1777
- Thoracocharax Fowler, 1907
