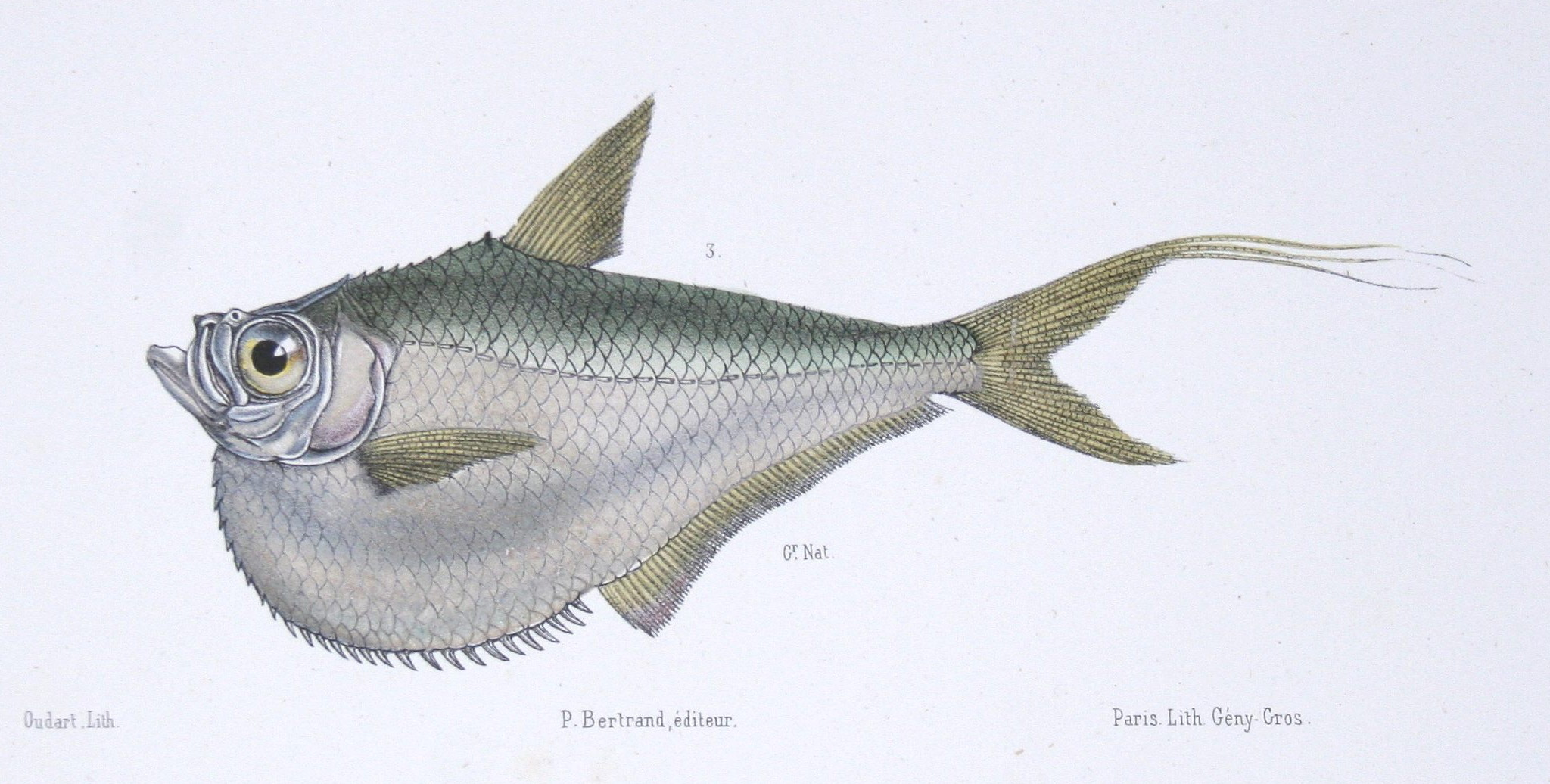
- Pristigaster cayana

Scientific classification
- Kingdom: Animalia
- Phylum: Chordata
- Class: Actinopterygii
- Division: Teleostei
- Order: Clupeiformes
- Suborder: Clupeoidei
- Family: Pristigasteridae; Bleeker, 1872

Genera
- See text

= Pristigasteridae =

Family of ray-finned fishes

Pristigasteridae is a family of ray-finned fish related to the herrings, including the genera Ilisha, Pellona, and Pristigaster. One common name for the taxon is longfin herring. The taxonomic classification of this family is in doubt; it was traditionally divided into two subfamilies, Pelloninae and Pristigasterinae, but molecular data indicates these families are not monophyletic.

Pristigasteridae are mostly coastal and schooling fishes of tropical and subtropical seas. Their usual length is 20–25 centimetres (7.9–9.8 in), but some Pellona can reach 55 cm (22 in).

== Genera ==
Pristigasteridae contains the following genera:

- Chirocentrodon Günther, 1868
- Ilisha Richardson, 1846
- Neoopisthopterus Hildebrand, 1948
- Odontognathus Lacépède, 1800
- Opisthopterus Gill, 1861
- Pellona Valenciennes, 1847
- Pliosteostoma Norman, 1923
- Pristigaster Cuvier, 1816
- Raconda J. E. Gray, 1831
