= Alaska pollock as food =

Eating species of cod globally

Alaska pollock (Gadus chalcogrammus), a species of cod (Gadus) found in the North Pacific Ocean, is used as food globally. Compared with common pollock, Alaska pollock is milder in taste, whiter in color, and lower in oil content.

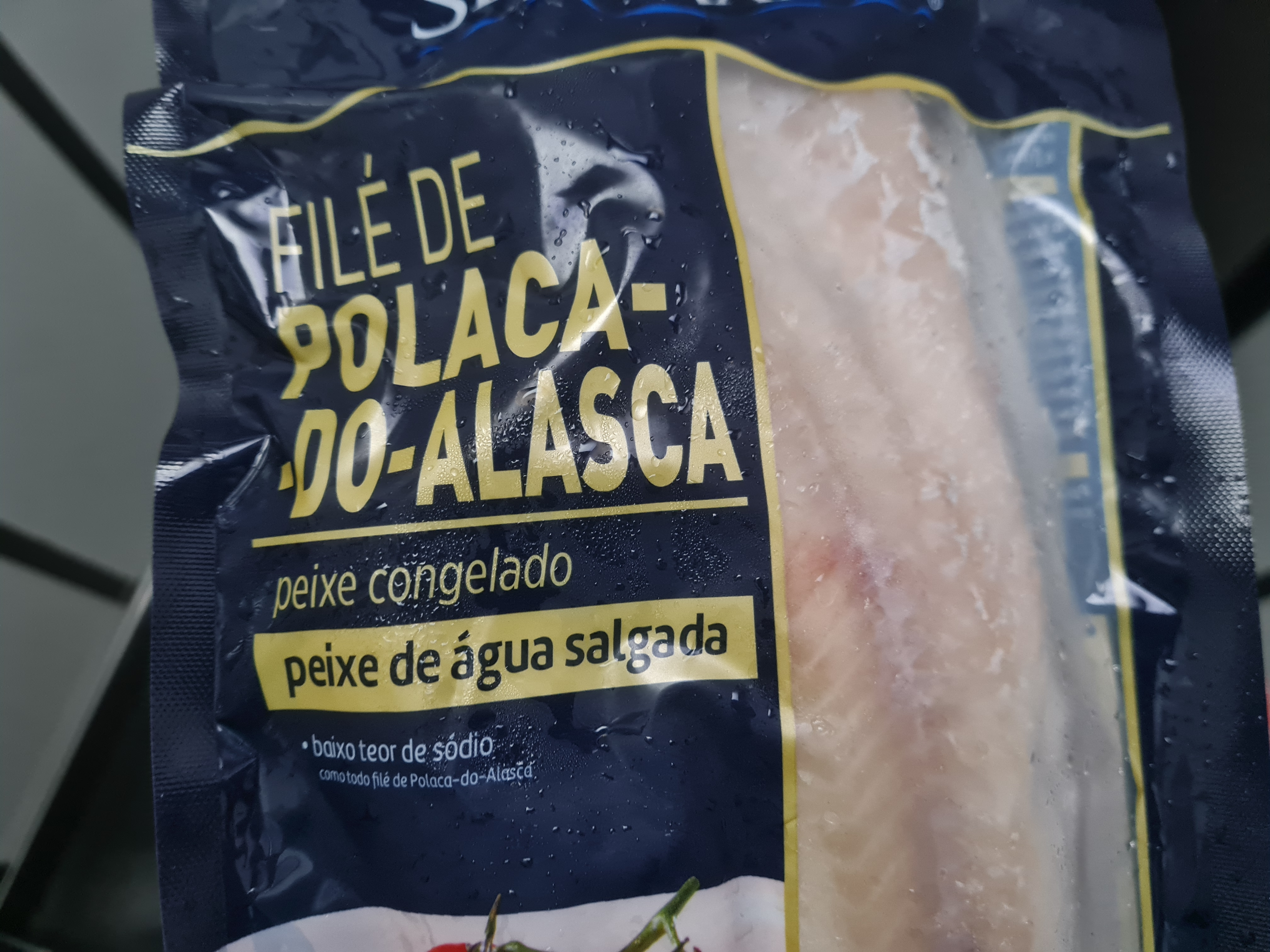
Alaska pollock frozen fillets sold in a market in São Paulo, Brazil

Alaska pollock fillets are commonly packaged into block molds that are deep frozen and used throughout Europe and North America as raw material for high quality breaded and battered fish products. Portions cut from frozen Alaska pollock fillet blocks are the most common choice for fast food restaurant fish sandwiches, for example in the McDonald's Filet-O-Fish.

Alaska pollock is also a common raw material used in the manufacture of surimi (fish paste). Alaska pollock is widely regarded as one of the best proteins for the manufacture of high quality surimi because of the high gel strength of its flesh.

== History ==
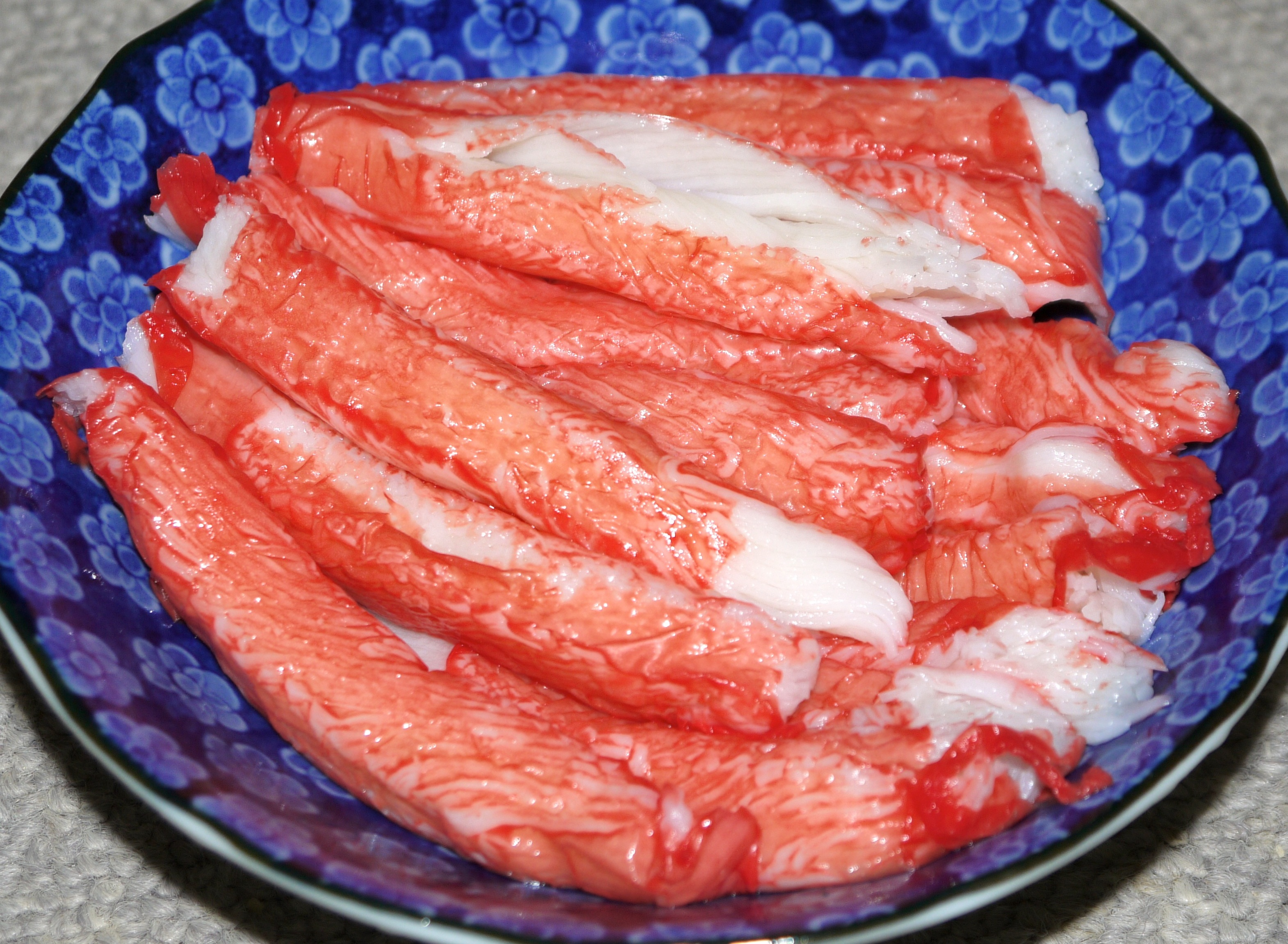
Imitation crab meat was invented in the 1970s, and today is often made from pulverized Alaska pollock

Pollock has been consumed in Korea since the Joseon era (1392–1897). One of its earliest mentions is in the 1652 Diary of the Royal Secretariat, which states that "the management administration should be strictly interrogated for bringing in pollock roe instead of cod roe."

In 1940, Alaska pollock was the most commonly caught fish in Korea, with more than 270,000 tonnes brought in from the Sea of Japan. However, the consumption of Alaska pollock in South Korea dropped to an estimated 260,000 tonnes per year by 2016. Much of it is imported from Russia due to changes in sea water temperatures.

Alaska Pollock is a sizeable resource of fish and makes up 32% of the total US landings and 58% of Alaska's. Pollock is the target of many of the world's fisheries and represents about 5% of the world's harvest. In the United States water's alone over 1.5 million mt have been caught, giving an estimated value of 600- 900 million dollars in profit, between the years 1992–1996.

== Processing ==
Alaska pollock fillets are layered into a block mold and deep-frozen for distribution. For high-quality products, high-grade fillets are frozen only once between catch and consumer. For lower quality, low-cost breaded and battered fish sticks, double-frozen or minced trim pieces are used instead.

== Use in fast food ==
Alaska pollock is commonly used in the fast food industry; in products such as McDonald's Filet-O-Fish sandwich Arby's Classic Fish sandwich, Long John Silver's Baja Fish Taco, and Birds Eye's Fish Fingers in Crispy Batter. Trident Seafoods and Chuck Bundrant were instrumental in popularizing the fish in the US in the 1980s; prior to then it had been most popularly consumed in Asia.

== Nutrition ==
Serving Size	100g
=== Calories ===	87 kcal
=== Protein ===	19 g
=== Fat ===	1 g
=== Carbohydrate ===	0.0 g
Cholesterol	74 mg
Calcium	13 mg
Iron	0.3 mg
Potassium	364 mg
Sodium	166 mg

== In Korea ==
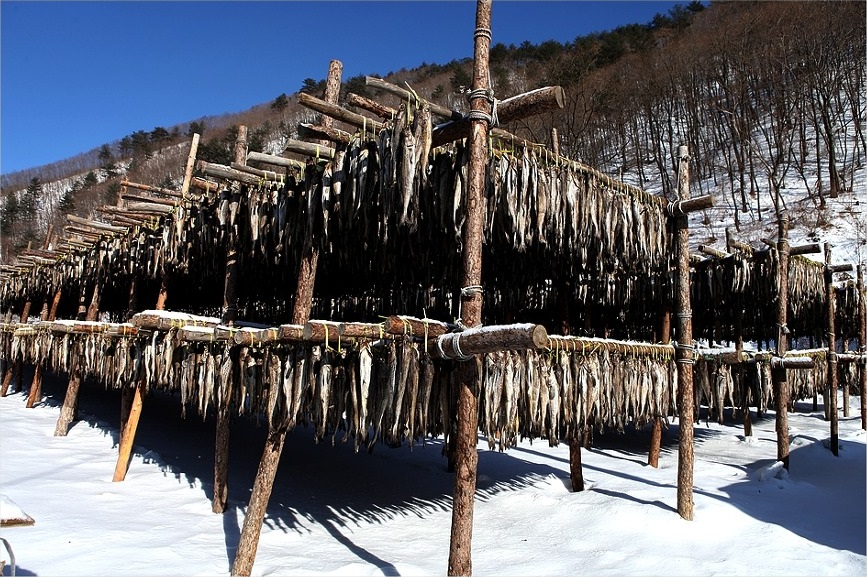
Making hwangtae, drying Alaska pollock during winter with repeated freeze-thaw cycles

Alaska pollock is considered the national fish of Korea. Its Korean name, myeongtae (Korean: 명태; Hanja: 明太), has also spread to some neighbouring countries: It is called mintay (минтай) in Russia, and the roe is referred to as mentai-ko (明太子) in Japan, although the Japanese name for the fish itself is suketōdara (介党鱈).

In Korea, myeongtae has more than 30 alternative names, including:

- saengtae (생태) – fresh Alaska pollock
- dongtae (동태) – frozen Alaska pollock
- bugeo (북어) – dried Alaska pollock
- hwangtae (황태) – "yellow" Alaska pollock
- nogari (노가리) – dried young Alaska pollock
- kodari (코다리) – "nosed" young Alaska pollock

Every part of a myeongtae, including the intestines and the roe, is used in Korean cuisine.

- changnan (창난) – Alaska pollock intestines
- myeongnan (명난) – Alaska pollock roe

=== Saengtae ===
Saengtae (생태), which is fresh Alaska pollock, is most often boiled with radish in a kelp-anchovy broth to create a clear soup, saengtae-tang. Another common preparation is myeongtae-jeon; pan-fried Alaska pollock patty. Saengseon-gaseu, the fish cutlet, is often made with filleted myeongtae. Fresh myeongtae can also be served raw as hoe, which is usually marinated and sometimes used as a topping for cold noodles.

Fermented products such as sikhae and jeotgal can subsequently be made with saengtae. Production of myeongtae-sikhae involves a fermentation process using the entire fish along with malt and rice, while changnan (창난) (the intestines) and myeongnan (명난) (the roe) are salted to make jeotgal, called changnan-jeot and myeongnan-jeot respectively.

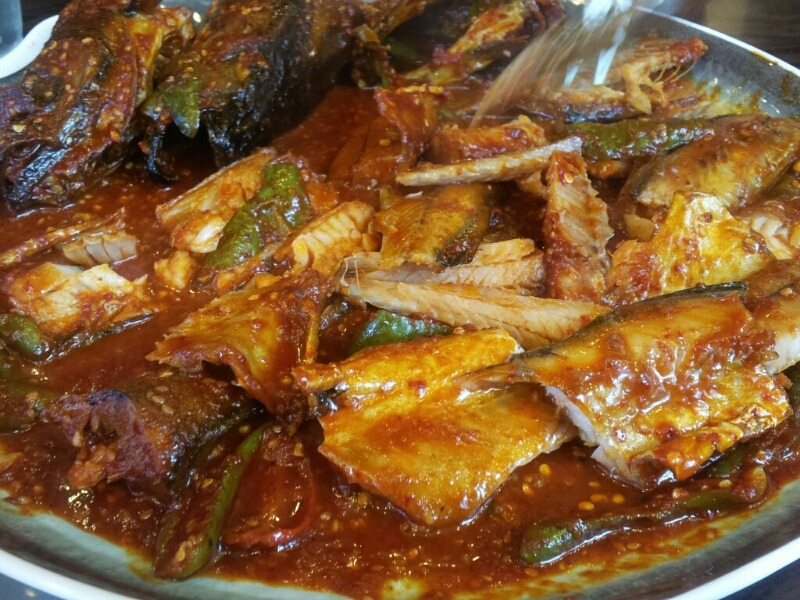
Myeongtae-jorim (simmered Alaska pollock)

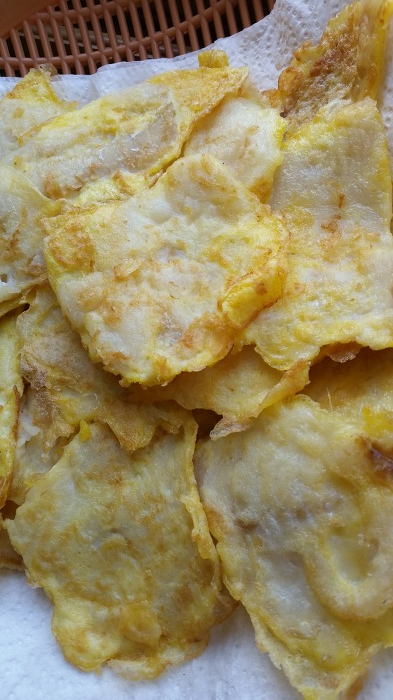
Myeongtae-jeon (pan-fried Alaska pollock)

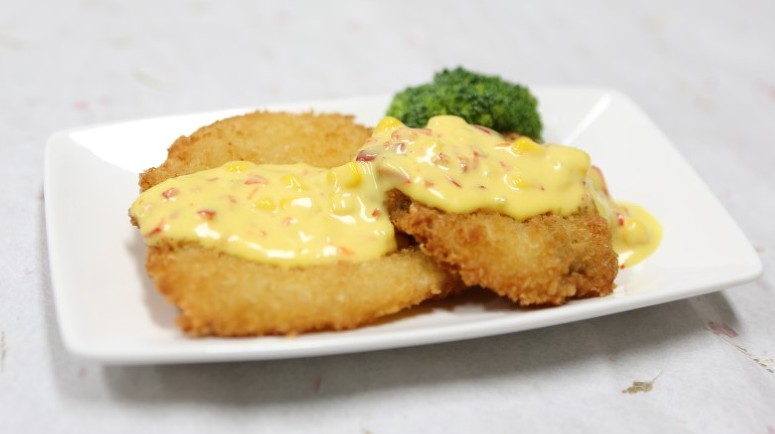
Saengseon-gaseu (Alaska pollock cutlet)

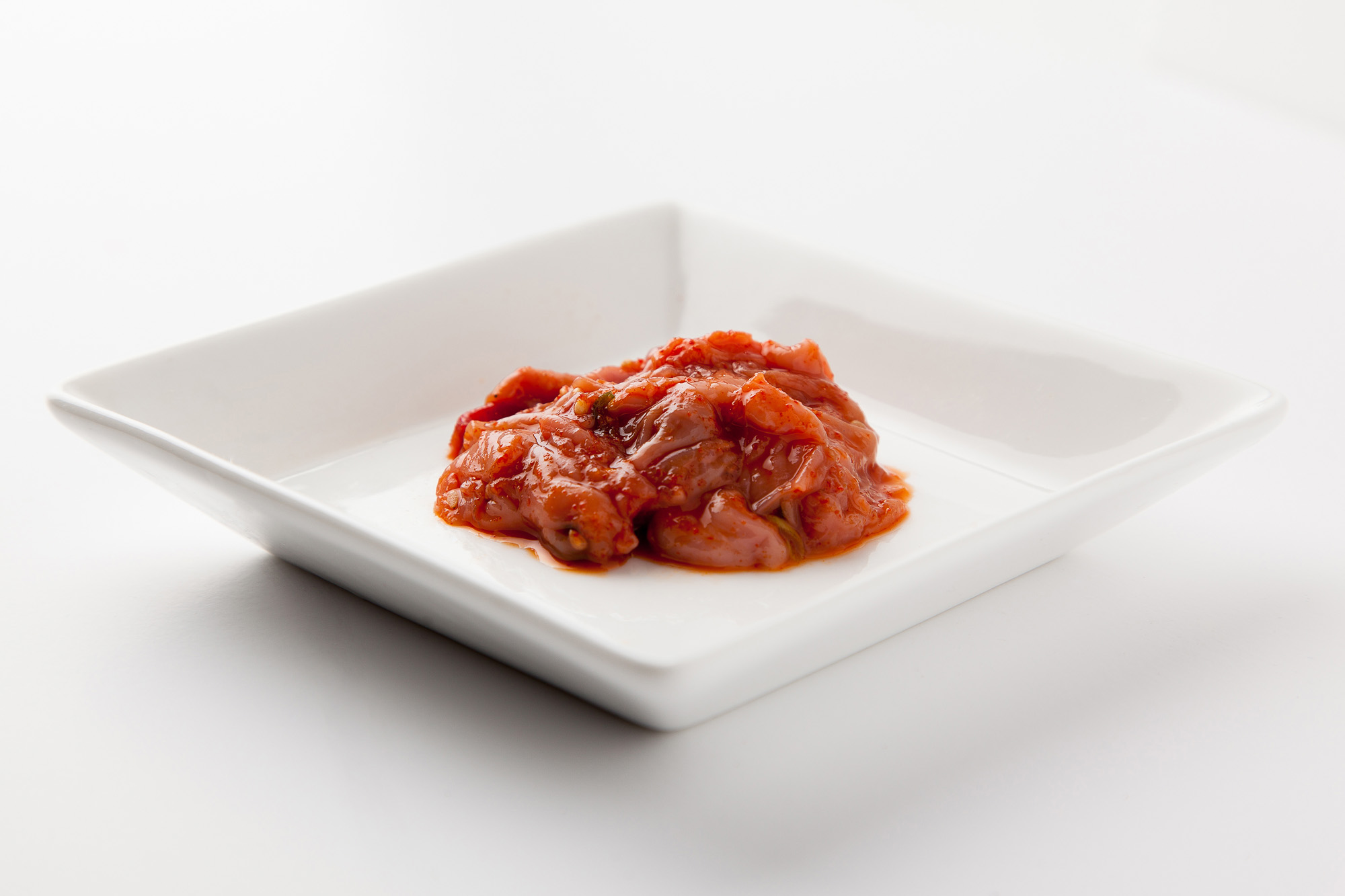
Changnan-jeot (salted Alaska pollock intestines)

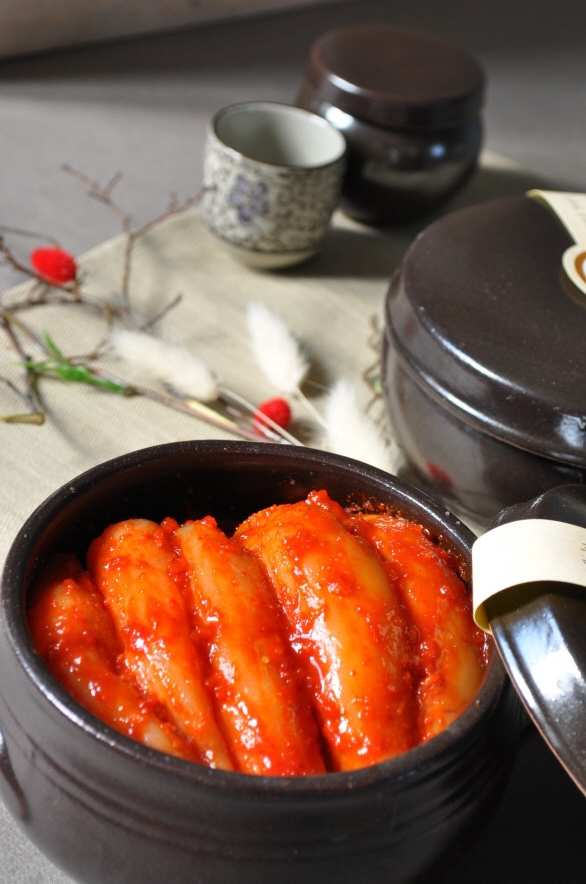
Myeongnan-jeot (salted Alaska pollock roe)

=== Dongtae ===
Dongtae (동태), which is frozen Alaska pollock, is typically eaten in a spicy stew, dongtae-jigae. It can also gutted and stuffed with vegetables to make a sundae, called dongtae-sundae.

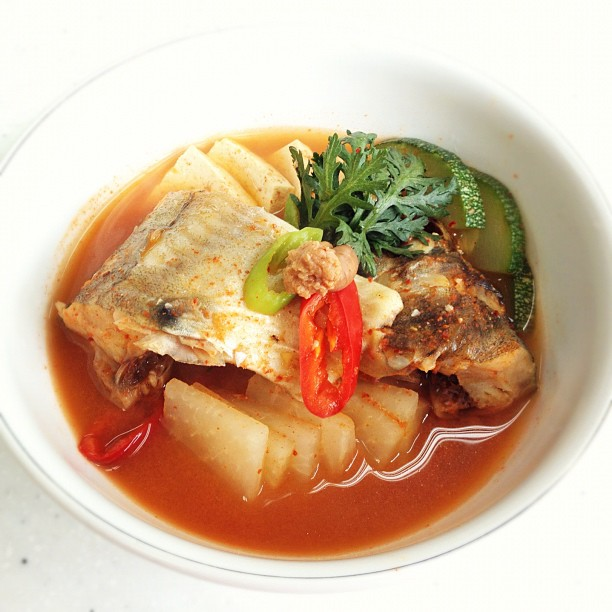
Dongtae-jjigae (frozen Alaska pollock stew)

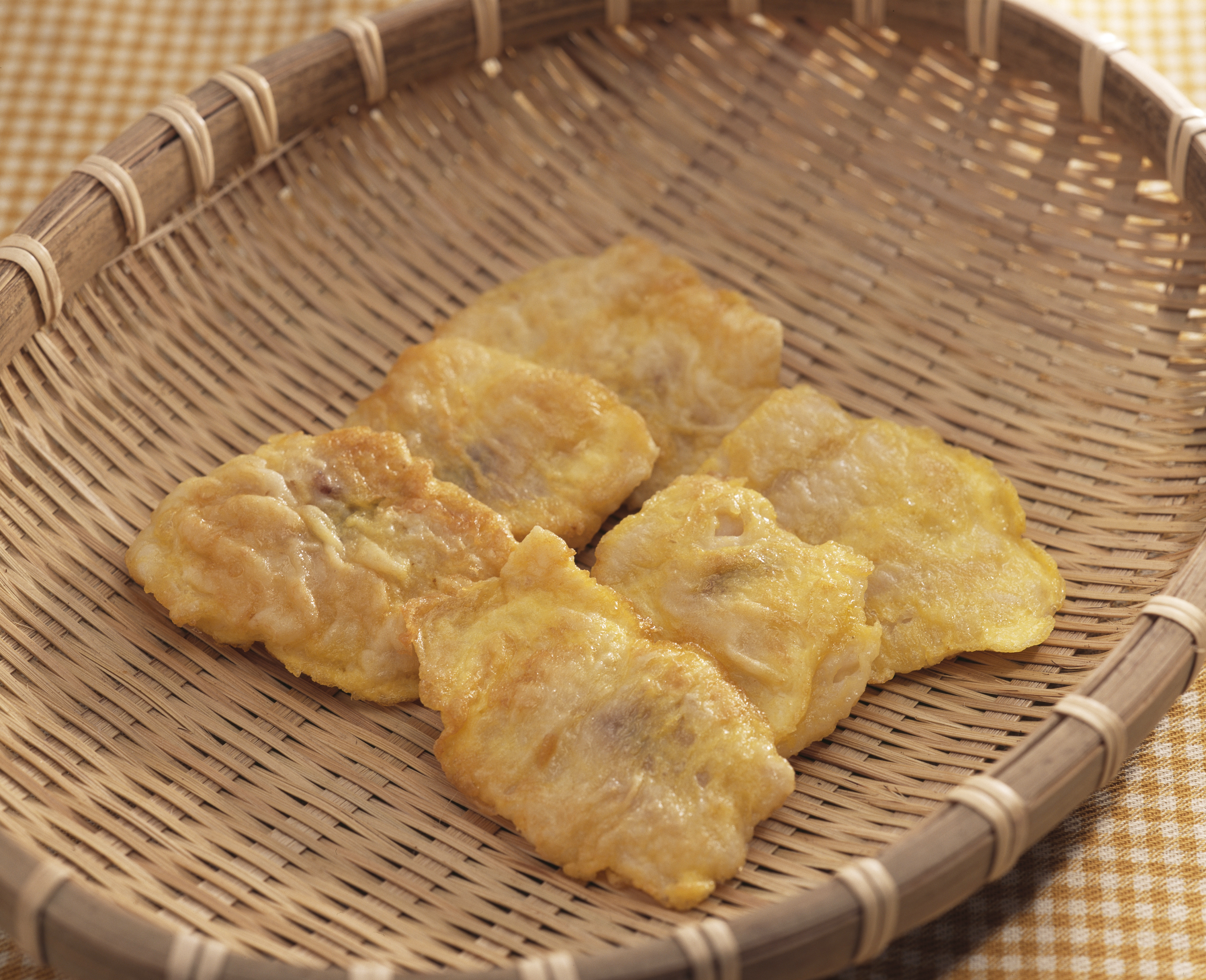
Dongtae-jeon (pan-fried frozen Alaska pollock)

=== Bugeo ===
Bugeo (북어), which is dried Alaska pollock, is often boiled in tteumul (water from the final rinsing of rice) to make a clear soup, bugeo-guk. Dried Alaska pollock head, referred to as bugeo-daegari, is a common broth ingredient in Korean cuisine. Other dishes made from bugeo include bugeo-jeok (skewered), bugeo-jangajji (pickled), bugeo-jeon (pan-fried), and bugeo-jorim (simmered). A dish called bugeo-bopuragi, literally "bugeo lint", is made by grating well-dried Alaska pollock into "lint" and seasoning it.

Bugeo can be thinly sliced, seasoned and dried to make fish jerky, called bugeo-po, which can be eaten plain or used as an ingredient in other side dishes.

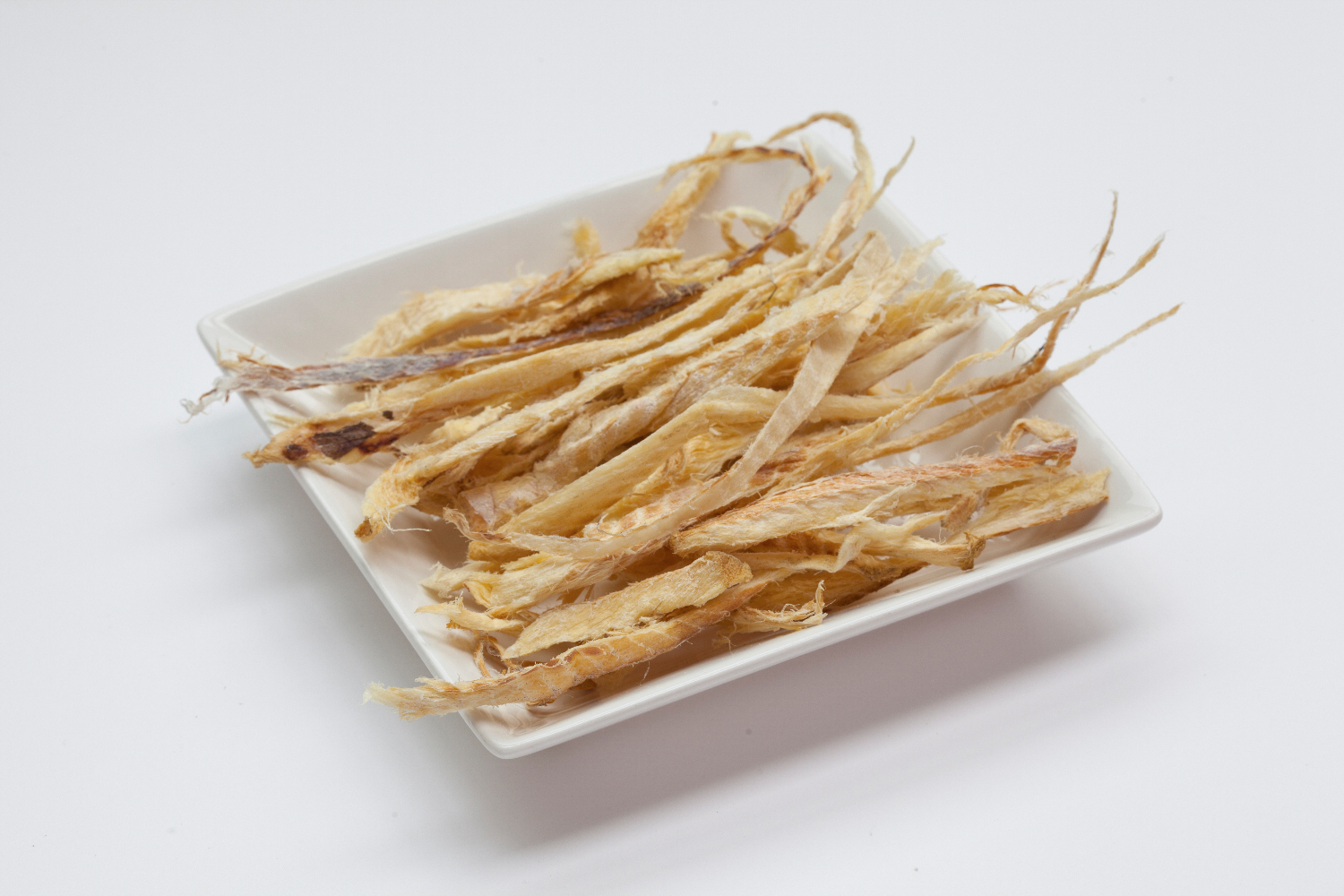
Bugeo-po (Alaska pollock jerky)

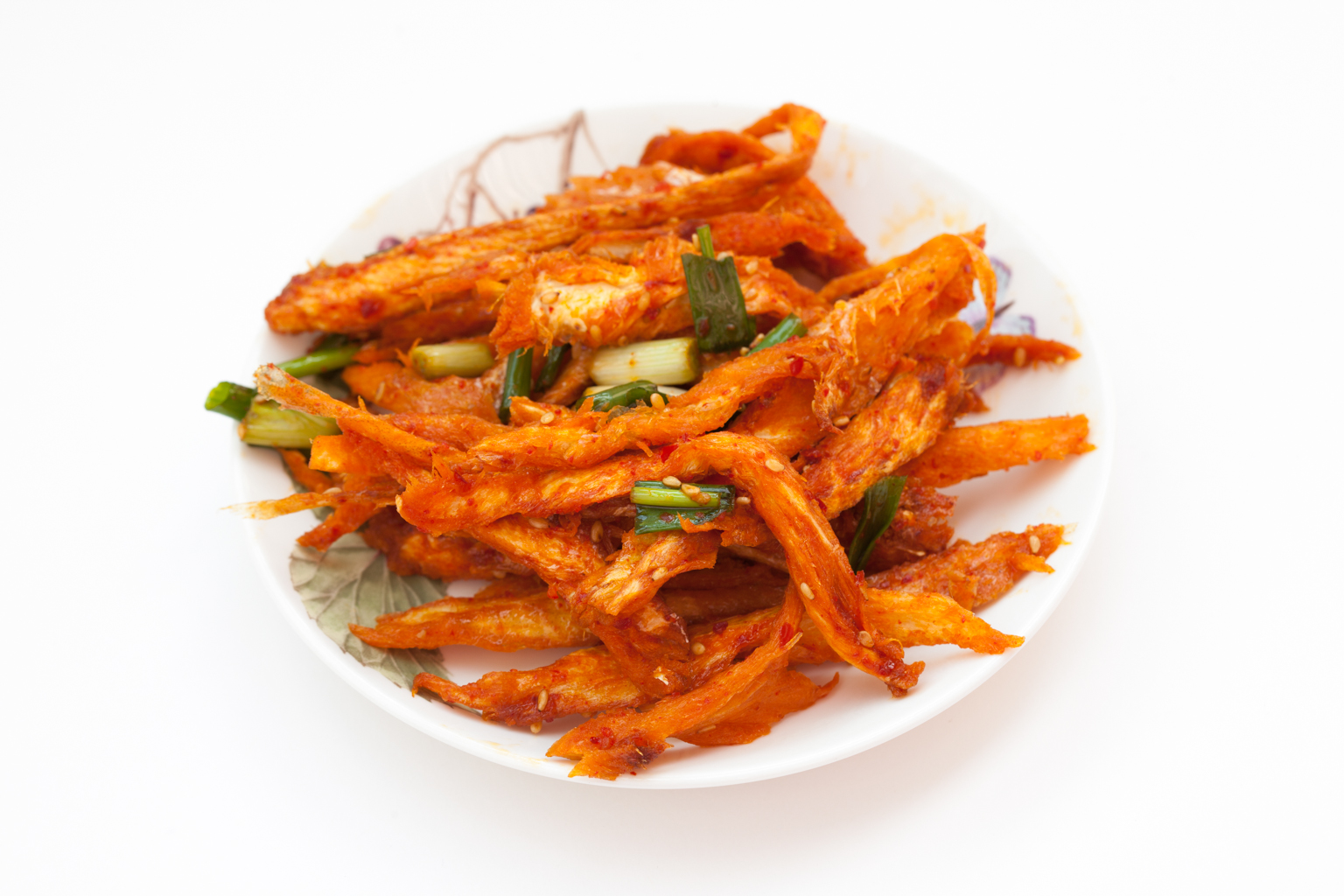
Bugeo-po-jorim (simmered Alaska pollock jerkey)

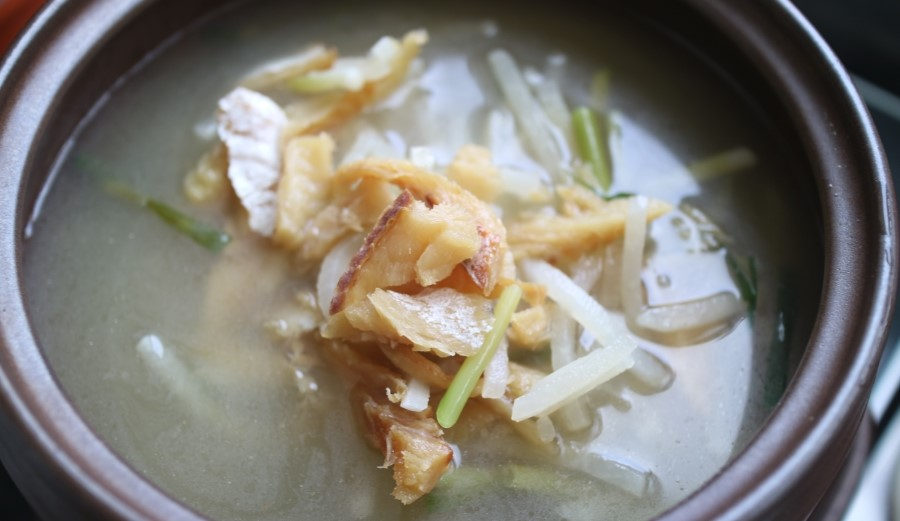
Bugeo-guk (dried Alaska pollock soup)

=== Hwangtae ===
Hwangtae (황태), which is yellow Alaska pollock, is made by drying the fish during winter and allowing it to undergo natural freeze-thaw cycles. It is often boiled into a soup called hwangtae-haejang-guk (hangover soup). Rehydrated hwangtae can be grilled (usually with a gochujang-based marinade) as hwangtae-gui, simmered hwangtae-jjim or jorim, or added to hwangtae-juk (rice porridge). Jerky made from yellow Alaska pollock is called hwangtae-po.

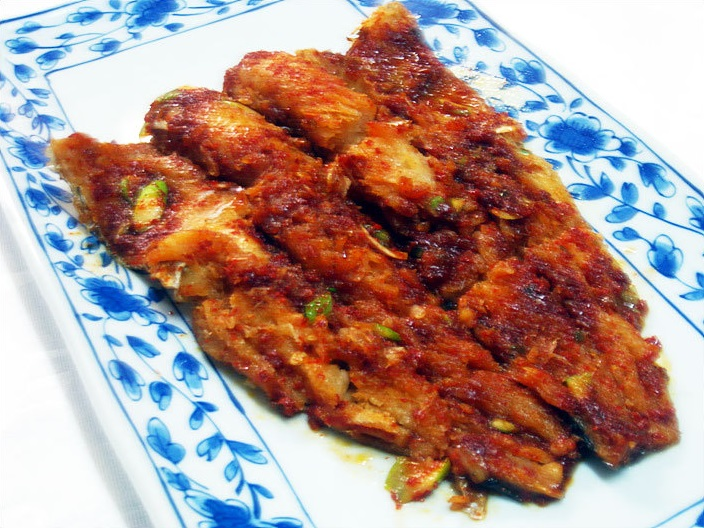
Hwangtae-gui (grilled yellow-dried Alaska pollock)

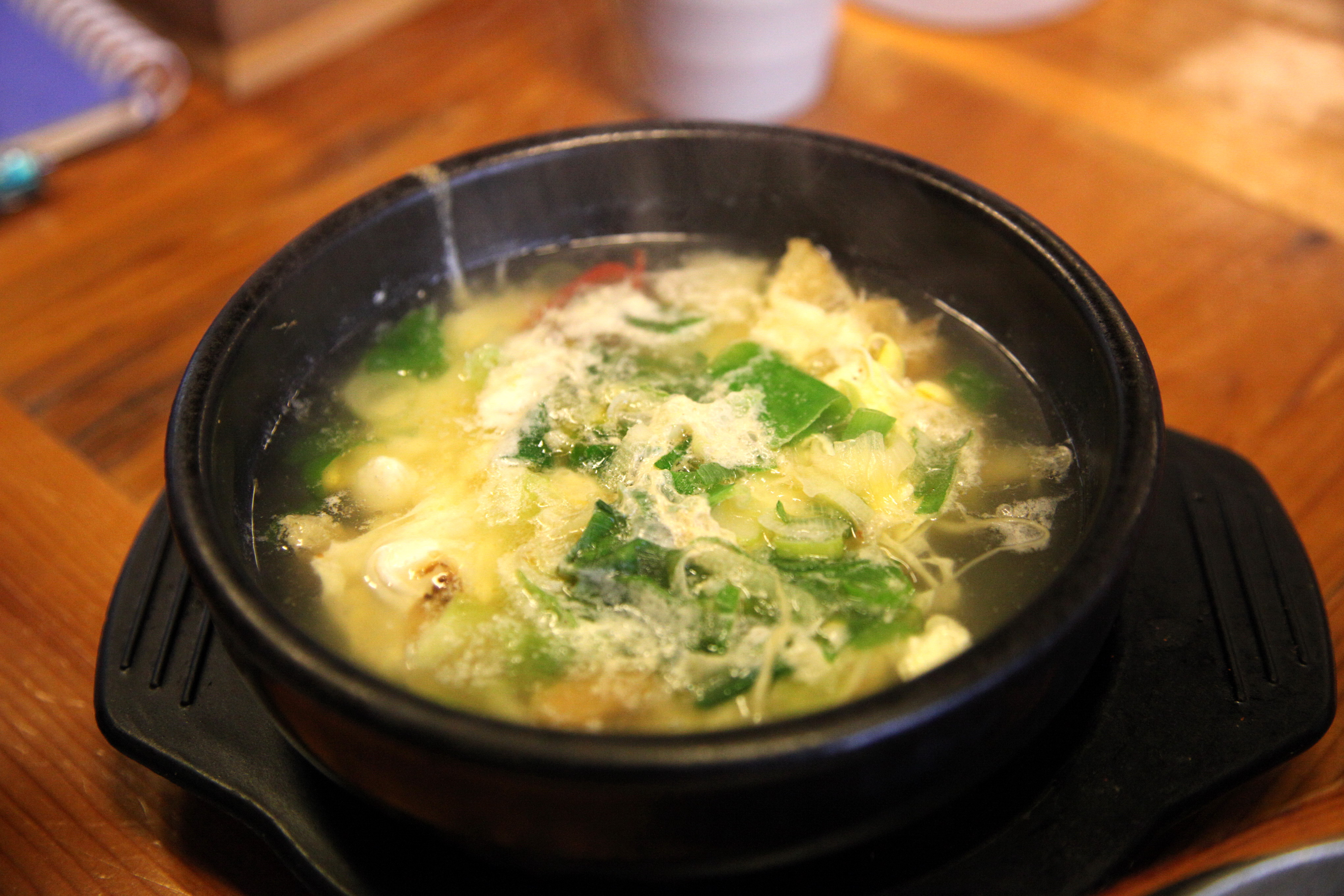
Hwangtae-haejang-guk (yellow-dried Alaska pollock hangover soup)

=== Nogari ===
Nogari (노가리), which is dried young Alaska pollock, is often served with a variety of dipping sauces as anju.

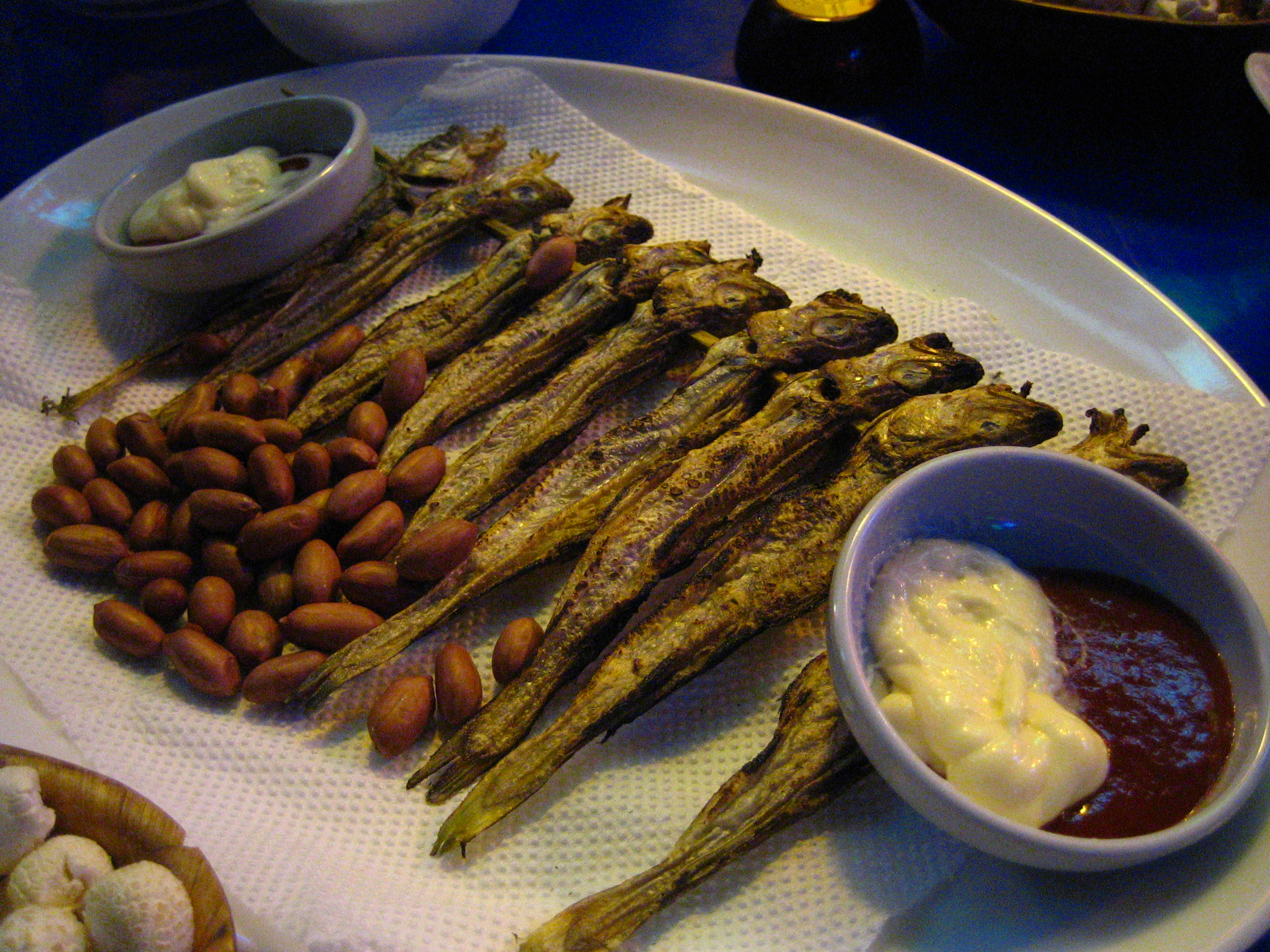
Nogari served as anju

=== Kodari ===
Kodari (코다리), which is the "nosed" variant, is made by gutting young Alaska pollock and half-drying them on ropes that are tied through their noses. It is often simmered with radish to make kodari-jorim.

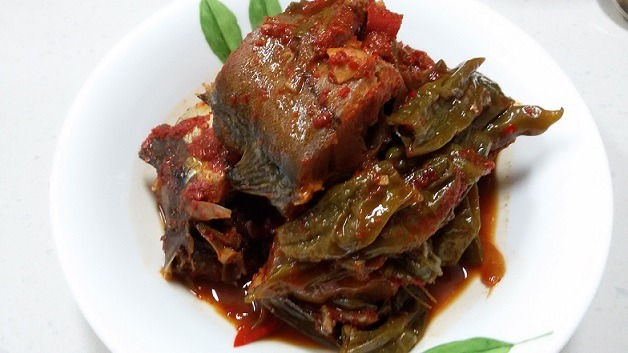
Kodari-jorim (simmered 'nosed' Alaska pollock)

== Roe ==
Alaska pollock roe, generally referred to simply as pollock roe, is a popular culinary ingredient in Japan, Korea, and Russia. In Korea, the roe is traditionally called myeongnan (명란) and the salted roe is called myeongnan-jeot (명란젓). The roe was introduced to Japan after World War II, and is called mentaiko (明太子) in Japanese. The milder, less spicy version is called tarako (鱈子) in Japanese. In Russia, Alaska pollock roe is sold as a canned product suspended in oil, which gives it a soft paste-like consistency.
