= Pollock roe =

Eggs of the pollock fish

Alaska pollock roe
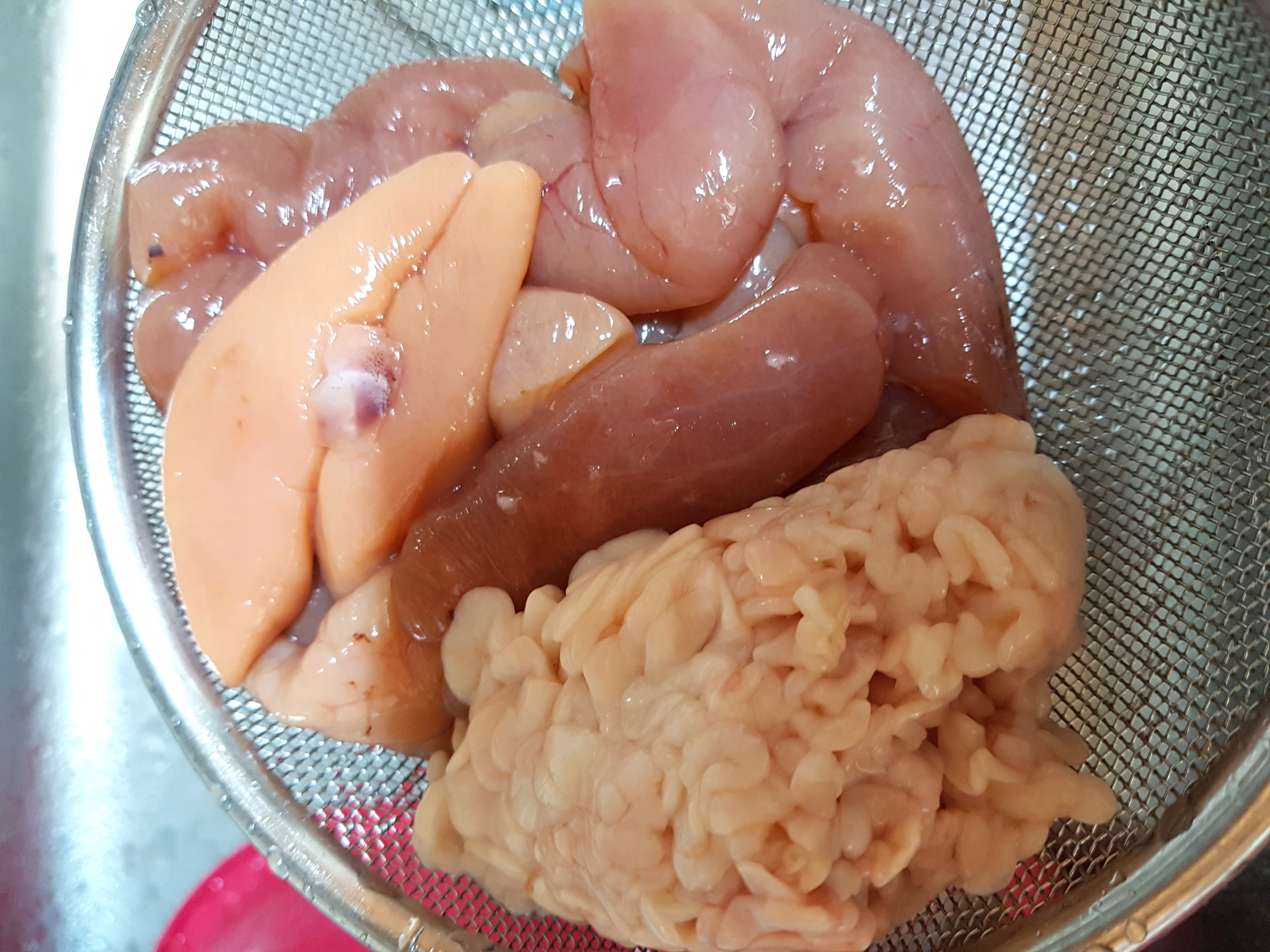
- Alaska pollack's liver (left), roe (top), and milt (bottom)

Korean name
- Hangul: 명란
- Hanja: 明卵
- Literal meaning: Alaska pollock roe
Transcriptions
- Revised Romanization: myeongnan
- McCune–Reischauer: myŏngnan

Japanese name
- Kanji: 鱈子
- Kana: たらこ
Transcriptions
- Revised Hepburn: tarako

Alternative Japanese name
- Kanji: 明太子
- Kana: めんたいこ
Transcriptions
- Revised Hepburn: mentaiko

Russian name
- Russian: икра минтая
- Romanization: ikra mintaya

Pollock roe, also pollack roe (also known as tarako or mentaiko in Japanese and myeongnan in Korean), is the roe of Alaska pollock (Gadus chalcogrammus) which, despite its name, is a species of cod. Salted pollock roe is a popular culinary ingredient in Korean, Japanese and Russian cuisines.

== Names ==
The purely Korean name for pollock, myeongtae can be written with Hanja 明太 (명태), which can be read as mentai in Japanese. But while the Japanese borrowed this name from Korean and called it mentaiko, the term does not retain the original meaning of plain raw roe, but specifically refers to chili pepper-added cured roe, while salt-cured only types are called tarako.

=== Korean ===
As aforementioned, Alaska pollock in Korean is myeongtae (Korean: 명태; Hanja: 明太), hence pollock roe is myeongnan (명란; 明卵), a contracted form of the compound with +ran or +nan (란; 卵) meaning "egg (roe)".

The salted roe dish is called myeongnan-jeot (명란젓), being considered a type of jeot (젓) or jeotgal, which is a category of salted seafood.

=== Japanese ===
In Japanese, (salted) pollock roe is called tarako (鱈子), though it literally means 'cod roe', (Note: i.e., tara (鱈; 'cod's') ko (子; 'child'), however, since pollock bears the name suketōdara (介党鱈) it is linguistically understood to be subtype of the tara or 'cod', so this is not exactly a misnomer in the Japanese language.) while true cod roe is distinguished by calling it hontarako. The pollock roe, also known as momijiko, are usually salted and dyed red. (Note: Whereas hontarako is usually sold raw, to be made into nitsuke (simmered or braise) or made into the soy sauce preserved tsukudani.)

Pollock roe cured with red chili pepper are 明太子 (mentaiko); to put it another way, mentaiko refers to chili-laced versions of tarako, generally speaking, even if not qualified as karashi-mentaiko with the prefix meaning 'chili'. (Note: That is to say, the sources treat mentaiko and karashi-mentaiko are synonyms, and thus interchangeable. Note that 'chili' is more formally tōgarashi = tō 'foreign, Chinese' + karashi 'mustard'.)

=== Russian ===
In Russian, pollock roe is called ikra mintaya (икра минтая). This name is also used to refer to salted roe. The Russian word ikra (икра) means "roe" and mintaya (минтая) is the singular genitive form of mintay (минтай), which means Alaska pollock. This word is derived from its Korean cognate, myeongtae (명태).

== History ==
=== Korea ===
Koreans have been enjoying pollock roe since the Joseon era (1392–1897). One of the earliest mentions are from Diary of the Royal Secretariat, where a 1652 entry stated: "The management administration should be strictly interrogated for bringing in pollock roe instead of cod roe." Recipe for salted pollock roe is found in a 19th-century cookbook, Siuijeonseo.

=== Japan ===
A 1696 Japanese book records the use of Alaska pollock's roe in Hokurikudō.

The dish mentaiko originates from Korea, but after years of modification, most of the pollock roe consumed in Japan is Japanese mentaiko. Toshio Kawahara (川原 俊夫, Kawahara Toshio), who was born in the city of Busan, Korea during the Japanese occupation, founded the oldest mentaiko company in Japan called "Aji no Mentaiko Fukuya" (ja:ふくや) after World War II. He made several modifications to myeongnan-jeot to adapt to Japanese tastes and introduced it to Japan as "Karashi mentaiko" (ja:辛子明太子), its popular name is "mentaiko". The milder, less spicy version is called tarako (鱈子) in Japan.

== Consumption ==
Myeongnan-jeot
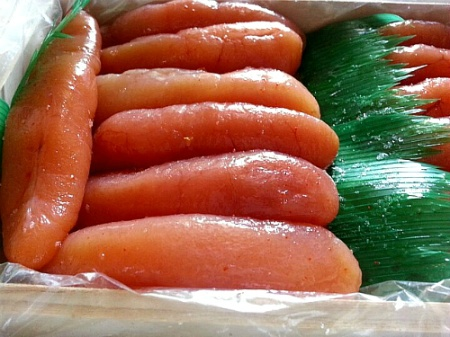
- Alternative names: Myeongnan; Myeongnan-jeot; Tarako; Mentaiko; Ikra mintaya
- Type: Jeotgal
- Course: Banchan
- Place of origin: Korea
- Associated cuisine: Korean cuisine Japanese cuisine Russian cuisine
- Main ingredients: Roe of Alaska pollock

Salted Alaska pollock roe

Korean name
- Hangul: 명란젓
- Hanja: 明卵젓
- Literal meaning: Alaska pollock roe jeotgal
Transcriptions
- Revised Romanization: myeongnanjeot
- McCune–Reischauer: myŏngnanjŏt

Japanese name
- Kanji: 鱈子/（辛子）明太子
- Kana: たらこ/（からし）めんたいこ
Transcriptions
- Revised Hepburn: tarako / (karashi-)mentaiko

Russian name
- Russian: икра минтая
- Romanization: ikra mintaya

=== Korea ===
Traditionally, myeongnan-jeot was made before dongji (winter solstice). Intact skeins of Alaska pollock roe are washed carefully with salt water, then salted in a sokuri (bamboo basket). The ratio of salt to roe ranges from less than 5:100 to more than 15:100. After 2–3 days, salted and drained roe is marinated for at least a day with fine gochutgaru (chilli powder) and finely minced garlic. Myeongnan-jeot is usually served with sesame seeds or some drops of sesame oil.

Myeongnan-jeot, whether raw, dried, and/or cooked, is a common banchan (side dish) and anju (food served with alcoholic beverages). It is also used in a variety of dishes, such as gyeran-jjim (steamed egg), bokkeum-bap (fried rice), and recently in Korean-style Italian pasta dishes which is affected by Japan's Mentaiko pasta.

Myeongnan-jeot is a specialty of South Hamgyong Province of North Korea, and Gangwon Province and Busan of South Korea.

Traditionally, Korean myeongran-jeot was a heavily salted fermented seafood product, primarily consumed in small portions as a side dish with rice. Its use in pasta, sandwiches, and various other modern dishes was influenced in part by Japanese mentaiko cuisine, which was subsequently introduced to Korea. For example, mentaiko spaghetti was invented in Tokyo in 1967.

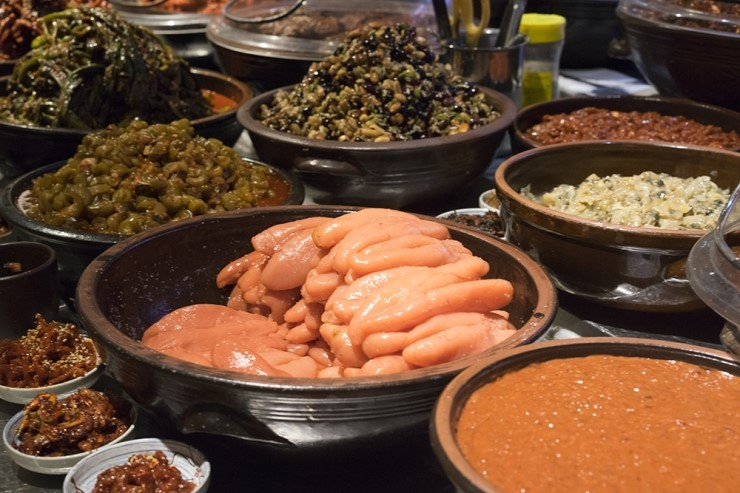
Myeongnan-jeot sold in a market

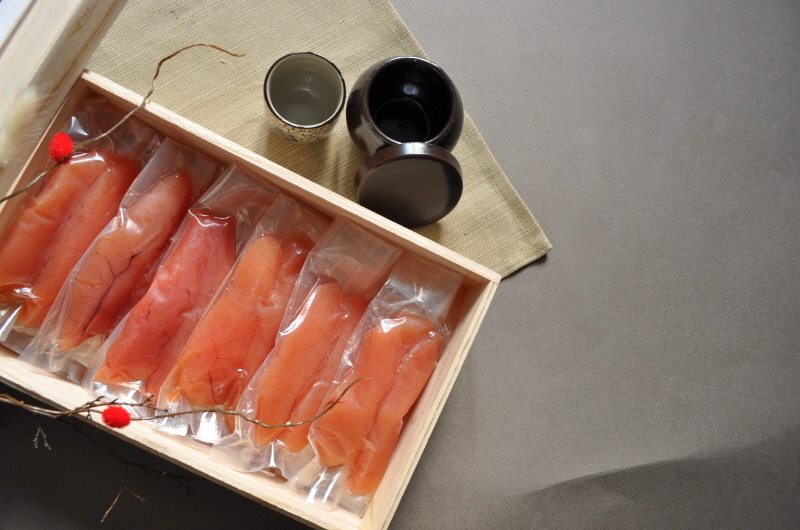
Vacuum-packed myeongnan-jeot

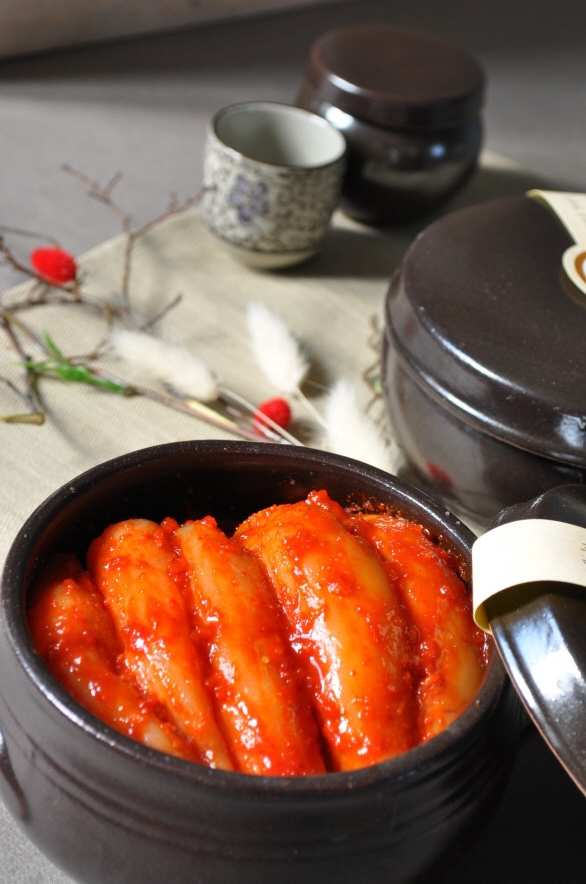
Heavily seasoned myeongnan-jeot

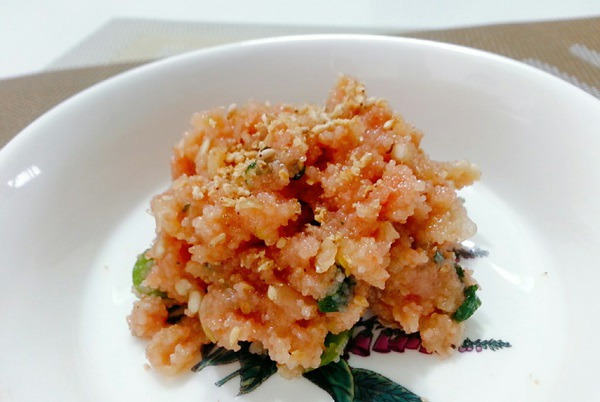
Myeongnan-jeot-muchim (salted pollock roe salad)

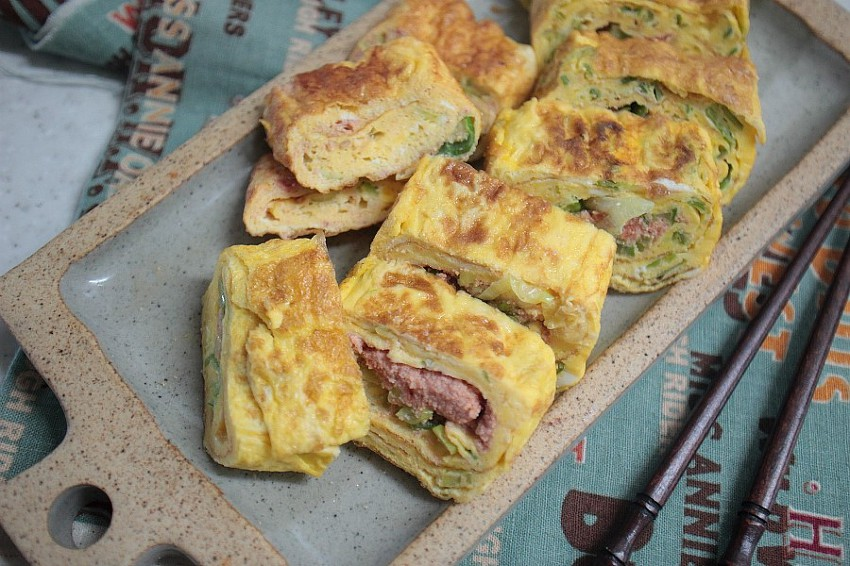
Myeongnan-jeot-gyeran-mari (rolled omelette with salted pollock roe)

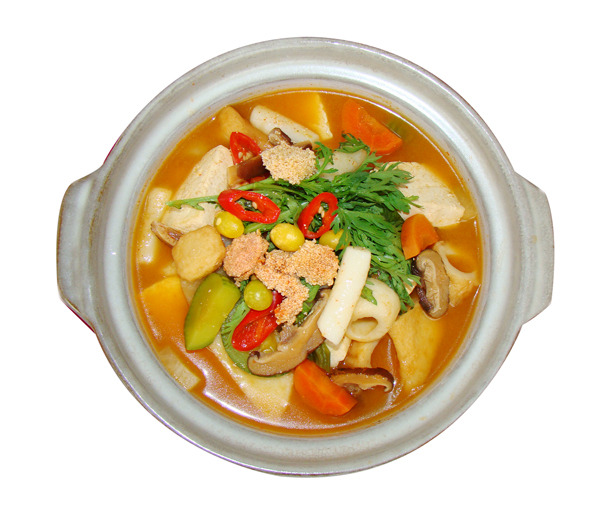
Myeongnnan-jeot in jjigae (stew)

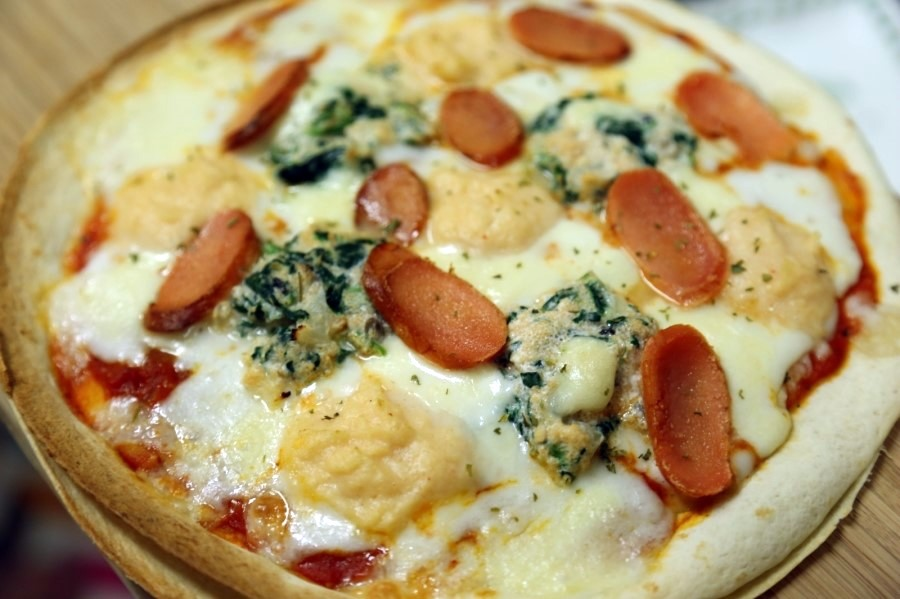
Myeongnan-jeot pizza

=== Japan ===
Mentaiko, adapted from Korean myeongnan-jeot, hence the name mentai (derived from the Korean myeongtae, 명태, 明太, meaning pollack) + ko (Korean 알, 子, meaning baby/roe), is common in Japan. It is made in a variety of flavors and colors and is available at airports and main train stations. It is usually eaten with onigiri, but is also enjoyed by itself with sake. A common variety is spicy mentaiko (辛子明太子, karashi mentaiko). It is a product of the Hakata ward of Fukuoka City. The milder version is called tarako (鱈子).

Recently in Japan, mentaiko pasta which is first invented in Tokyo in 1967, has become common. Mentaiko is mixed with butter or mayonnaise and used as a sauce for spaghetti. Thin strips of nori (海苔) and shiso leaves are often sprinkled on top.

Pollock roe is dipped in a seasoning liquid. This method was invented in the grocery store "Fukuya(ふくや)" and became common in Japan.

Mentaiko is a popular ingredient in Japanese cuisine, commonly served as a side dish and used in a wide variety of dishes. It is often eaten on its own with rice or used as a filling or topping for onigiri (rice balls), and is incorporated into numerous Japanese dishes, including tamagoyaki (Japanese rolled omelette), dashimaki tamago, chazuke, ochazuke, pasta, spaghetti, udon, fried rice, potato salad, baked potatoes, grilled dishes, and Japanese-style bread. It is also used in dishes such as mentaiko French bread, mentaiko cream pasta, and iwashi mentaiko (sardines stuffed with mentaiko). Its distinctive savory, salty, and mildly spicy flavor makes it a versatile ingredient in both traditional and modern Japanese cooking.

Mentaiko was nominated as Japan's number one side dish in the Japanese weekly magazine, Shūkan Bunshun.

Tarako is served in a number of ways: plain (usually for breakfast), as a filling for onigiri, and as a pasta sauce (usually with nori). Traditionally, tarako was dyed bright red, but recent concerns about the safety of food coloring have all but eliminated that custom. In Kyūshū, tarako is commonly served with red chili pepper flakes.

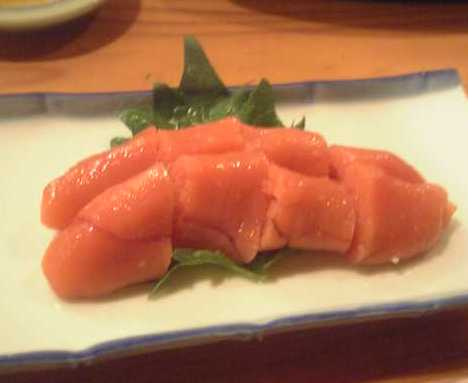
Tarako

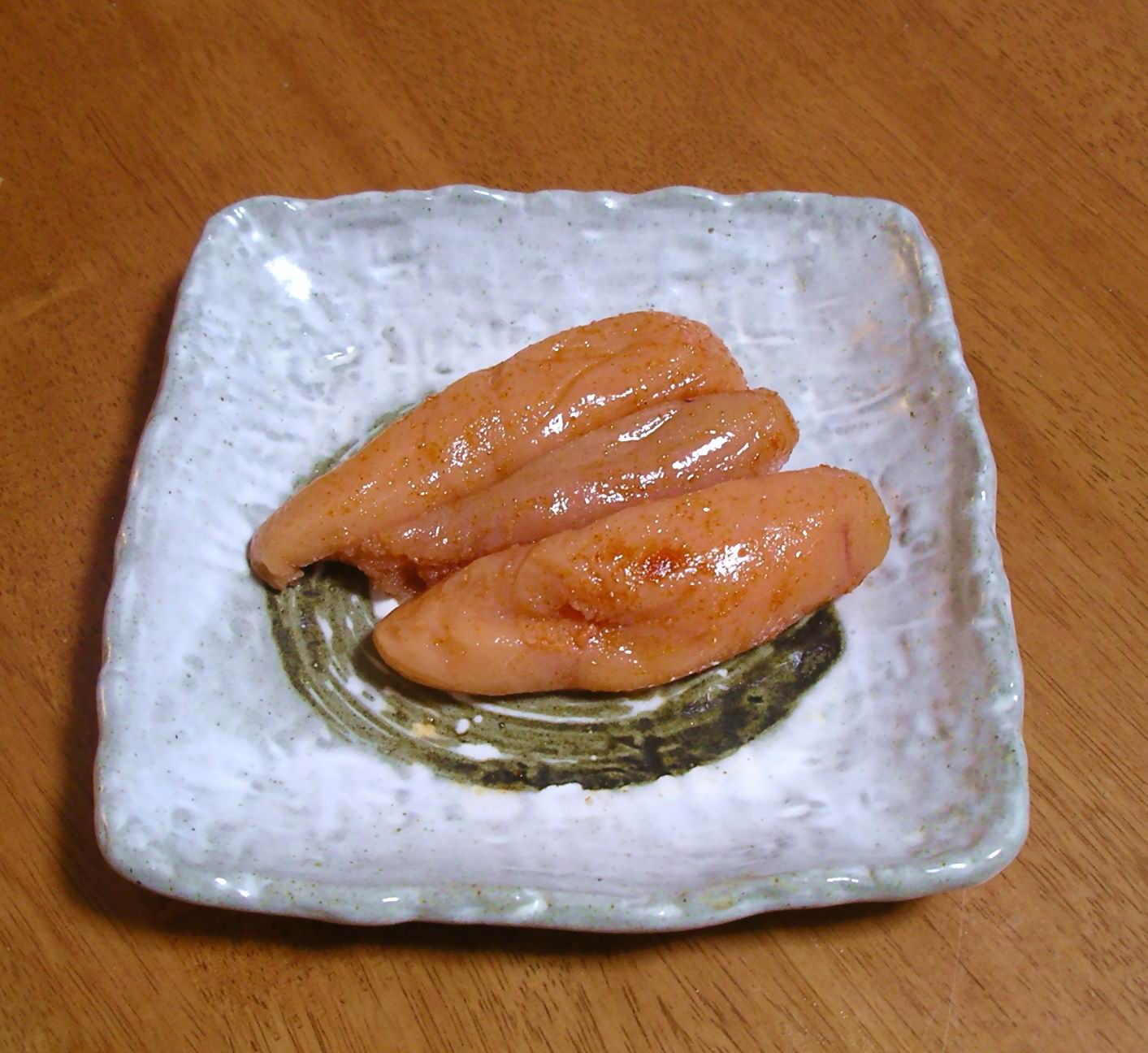
Mentaiko

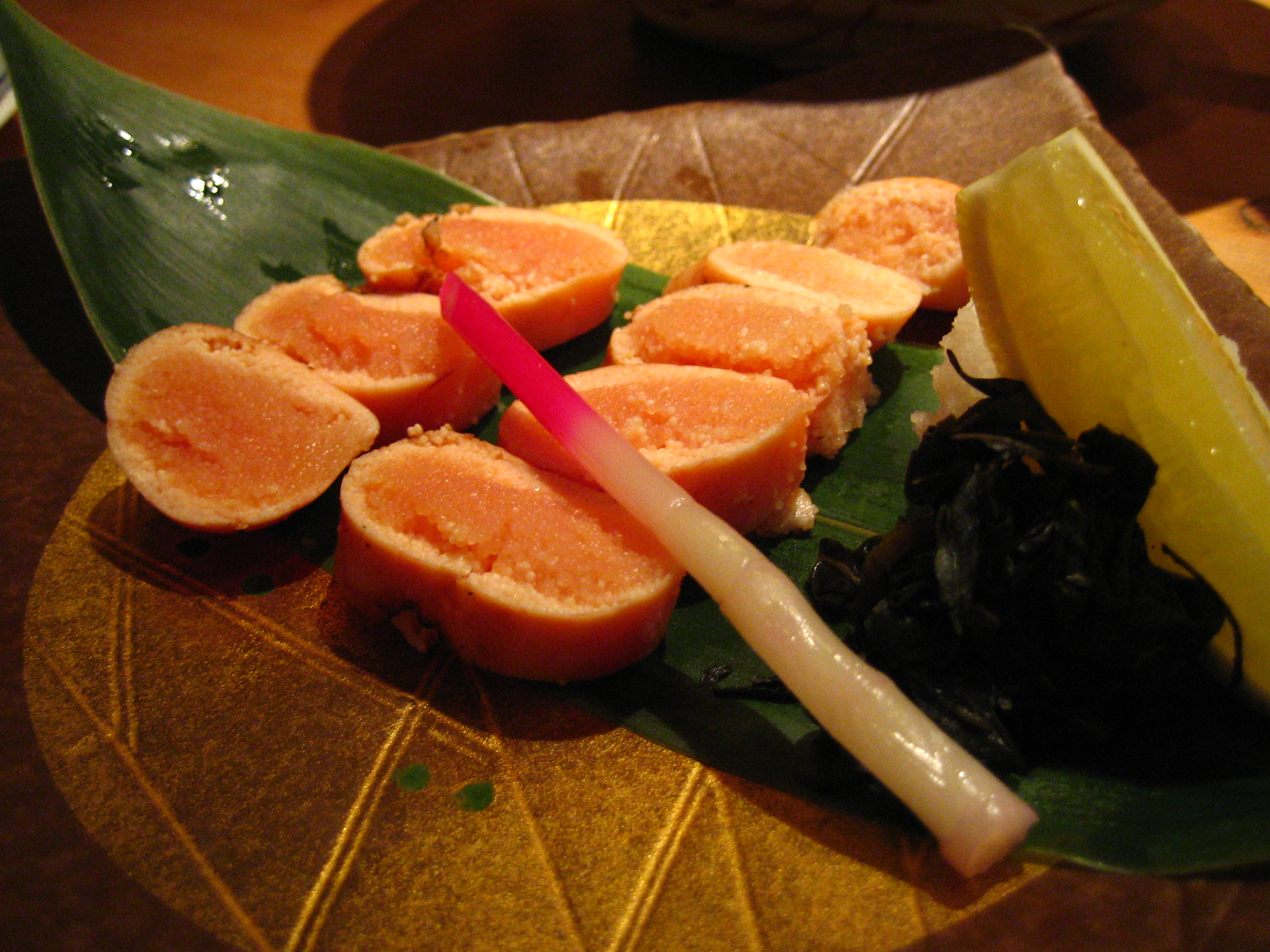
Baked mentaiko

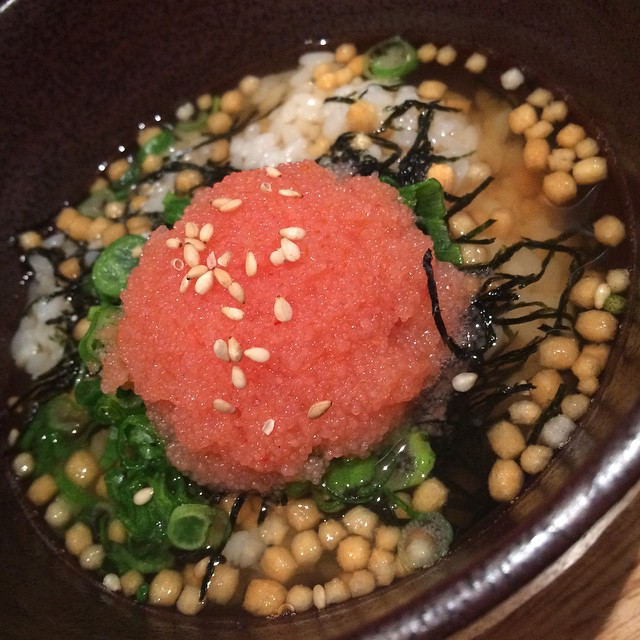
Mentaiko-chazuke

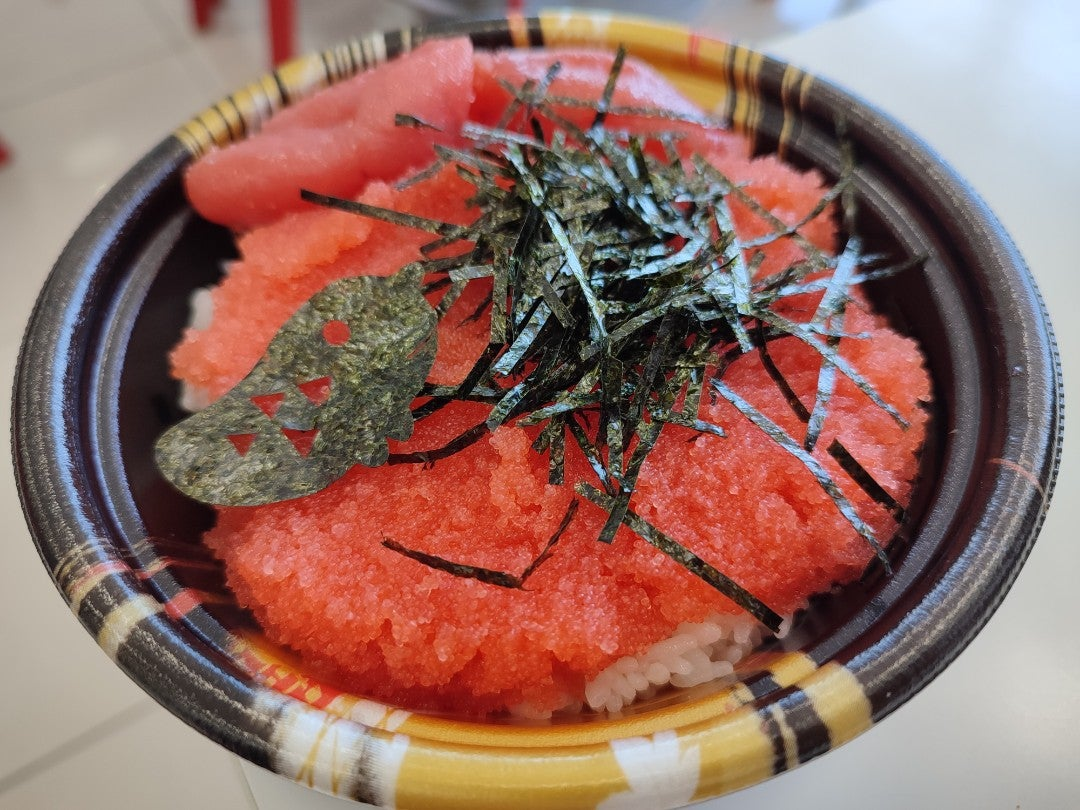
Mentaiko over rice, with nori strips

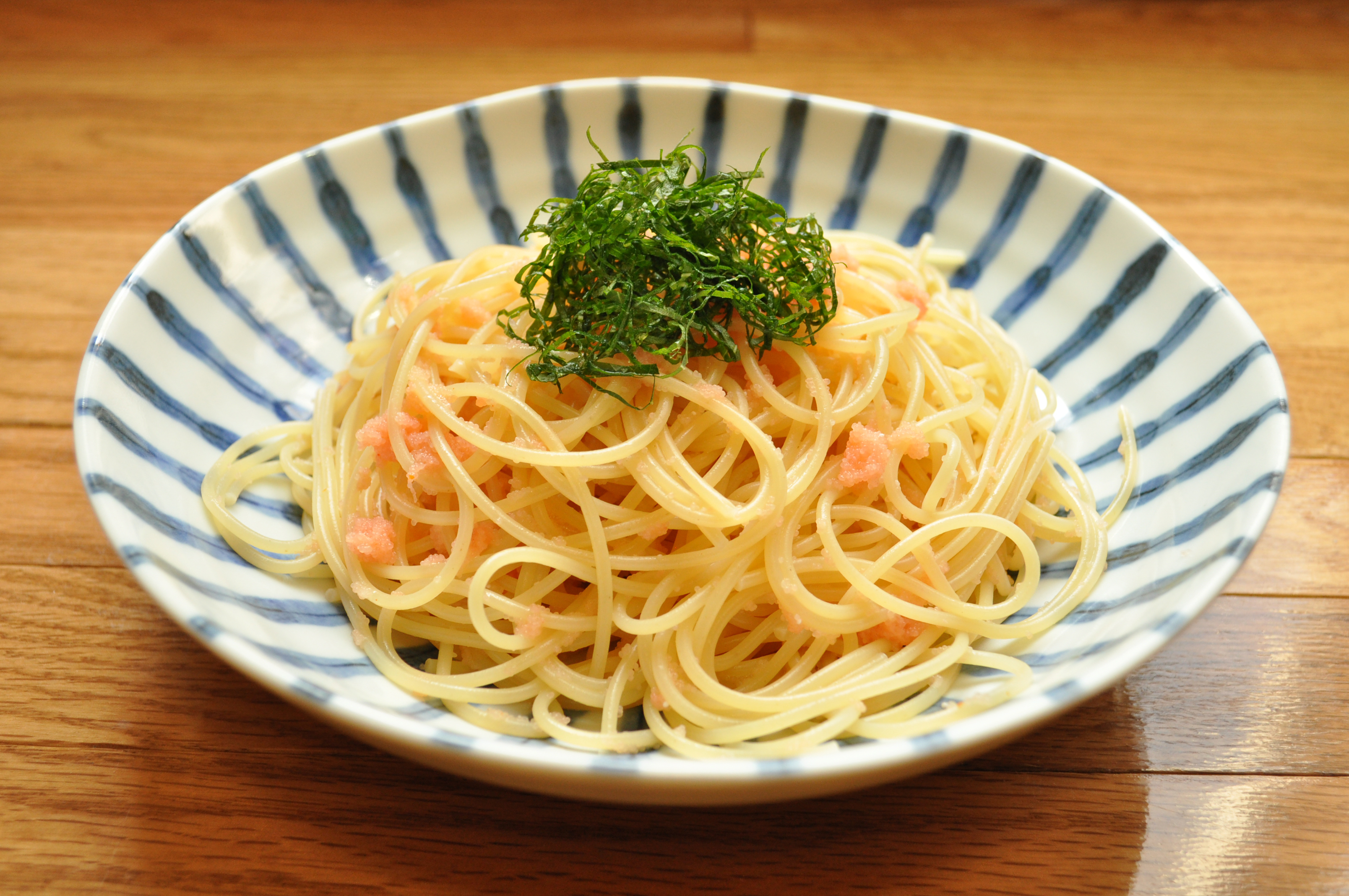
Tarako spaghetti

=== Russia ===
In Russia, pollock roe is consumed as a sandwich spread. The product, resembling liquid paste due to the small size of eggs and oil added, is sold as canned food.

As mentioned above, in Russian, the word for pollock roe is the same as for the caviar: "ikra". The same goes to a dish, known to the French as "caviar d'aubergine": "кабачковая икра", although it's a spread made of eggplants.

To make the pollock roe taste in a caviar-like way, one should make a butterbrot first e.g. to apply butter to the bread before adding the canned pollock roe. This will smoothen the excessive saltiness of the canned roe.

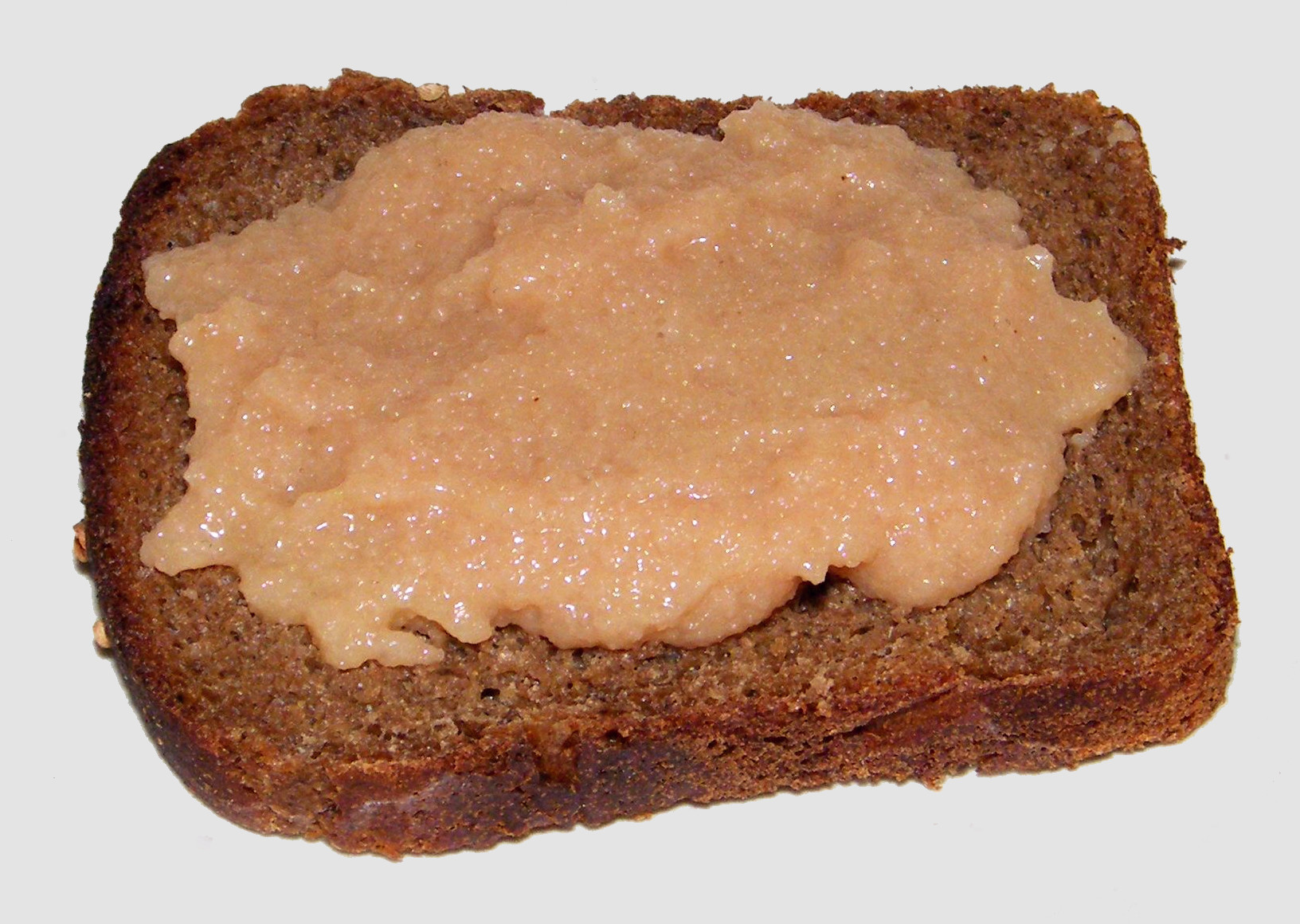
An open sandwich with canned roe

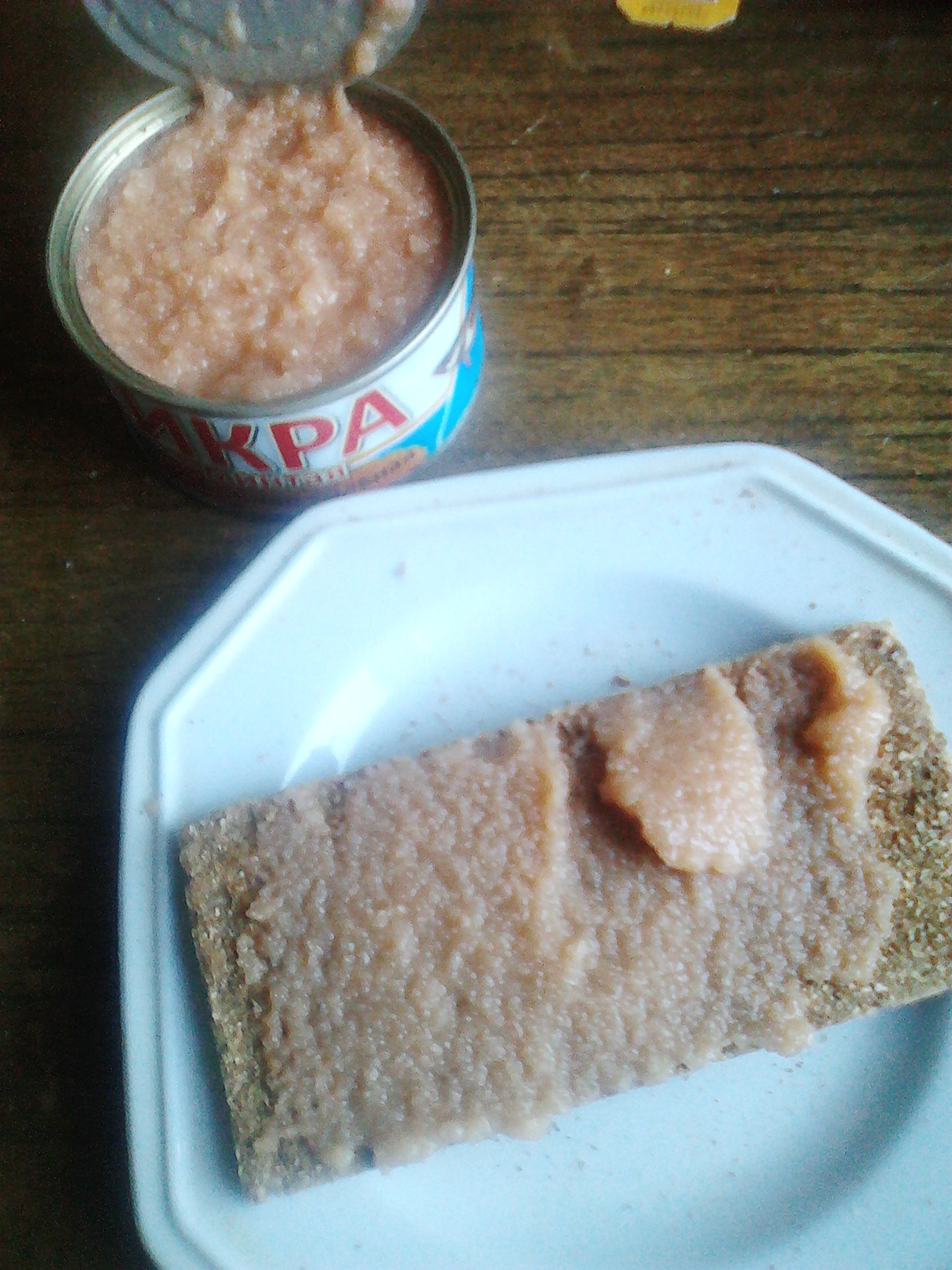
A piece of similar bread with less roe used since Ikra mintaya (canned roe) is rather salty.

== See also ==
- Alaska pollock as food
- Jeotgal
- Masago
- Tobiko
- Taramasalata
