= Dongaseu =

Korean pork dish

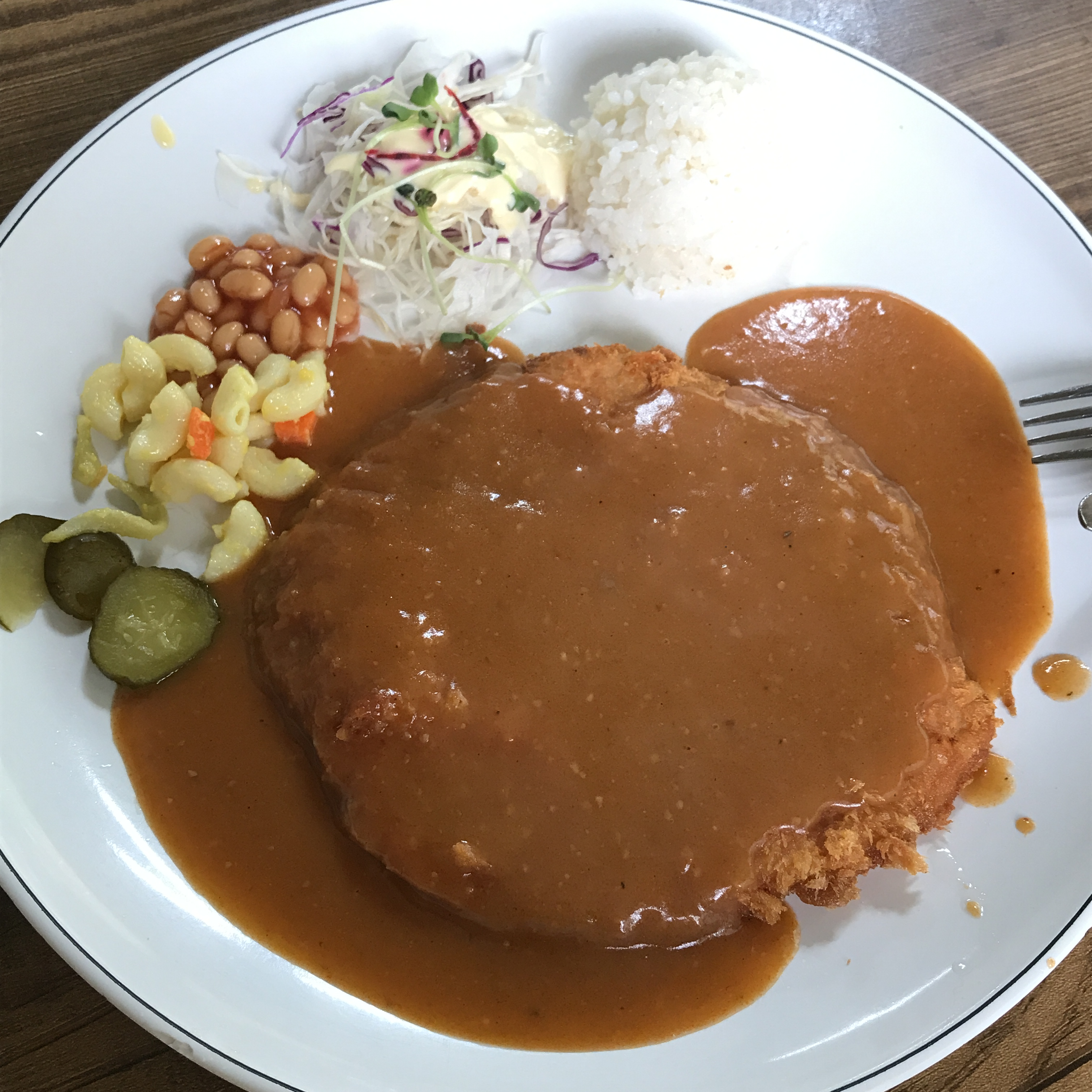
- Dongaseu (bottom)

Korean name
- Hangul: 돈가스; 돈까스
- RR: dongaseu; donkkaseu
- MR: ton'gasŭ; tonkkasŭ
- IPA: [tonk͈as͈ɯ]

Dongaseu (Korean: 돈가스) or donkkaseu (돈까스) is a Korean pork cutlet that originated from the tonkatsu (Japanese pork cutlet), a dish belonging to the yōshoku (Japanese-style Western cuisine) style. It was introduced to Korea from Japan between the 1920s and 1930s.

Today in Korea, it is often called gyeongyangsik dongaseu (경양식 돈가스), which translates to "light Western-style pork cutlet". It consists of a breaded, deep-fried pork cutlet. Typically it is served with sauce poured over the top, with white rice and a vegetable based banchan side dish.

== History ==
The dish was introduced to Korea around 1930s during the period of Japanese rule, but the thick, Japanese-style tonkatsu failed to gain popularity. Dongaseu became popular in the 1960s, with the spread of gyeongyangsik—light western food—restaurants. The dish, although called by the Japanese-derived name dongaseu, followed Western pork cutlet recipes such as those of the Austrian Schnitzel—thinned by pounding before being breaded and deep-fried. It was not sliced, and served with bread. Western-style appetizer soup was served before the dish. Dongaseu developed into two distinct varieties. In 1977, gyeongyangsik-style dongaseu with thin meat became a popular menu in gisa sikdang—drivers' restaurant, similar to transport café—with the addition of chili peppers and kimchi as an accompaniment. As gyeongyangsik restaurants nearly disappeared, this style of dongaseu is now commonly served in drivers' restaurants and bunsik-jip (snack restaurants). A second style of dongaseu, with thicker meat and served sliced following the Japanese method, was made popular in 1983 by a restaurant called Myeongdong Dongaseu. This style of dongaseu is now commonly served in authentic Japanese restaurants.

== Preparation and serving ==
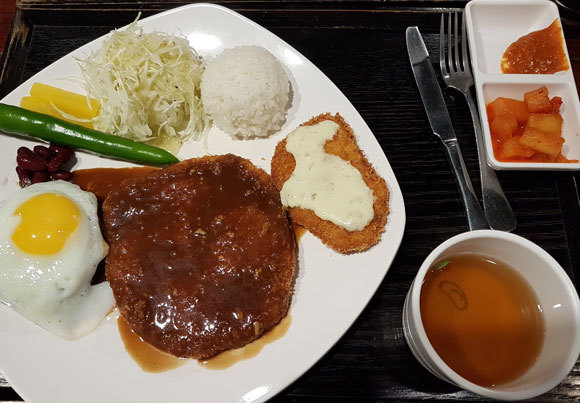
Dongaseu served with chili peppers, ssamjang, and kimchi

Korean dongaseu is different from Japanese tonkatsu in that it is thinner and often served unsliced, thus eaten with a knife and fork, not chopsticks, and is served with demi-glace on top of the fried meat (or in case of fish cutlet, tartar sauce on the fried fish). Common accompaniments include shredded cabbage sprinkled with ketchup-mayonnaise mixture, baked beans, macaroni salad, sweet corn, and danmuji (yellow pickled radish). Green chili peppers and doenjang (soybean paste) or ssamjang (wrap sauce) for dipping the chili peppers, baechu-kimchi (cabbage kimchi) or kkakdugi (radish kimchi), and rice with Korean or Japanese style soup can be served with the dongaseu plate. Alternatively, bread can replace rice, in which case Western-style soup is served before the main plate as an appetizer.

== Variations ==
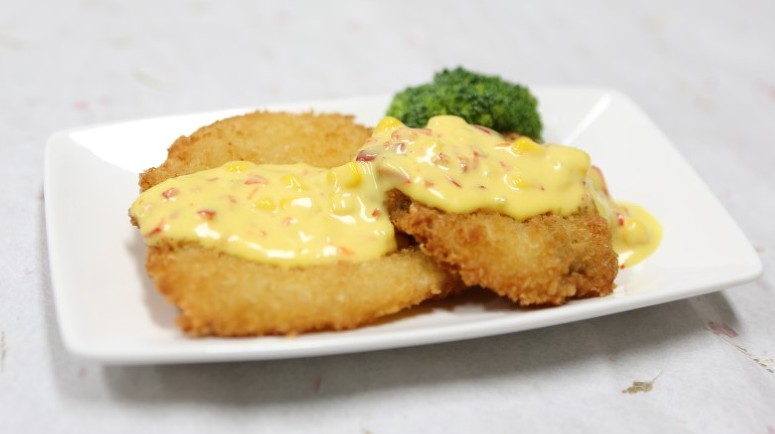
Saengseongaseu (fish cutlet)

- saengseongaseu (생선가스), a fish cutlet similar to dongaseu, is served with tartar sauce, instead of demi-glace.

== See also ==
- List of pork dishes
