= Toro (sushi) =

Fish product

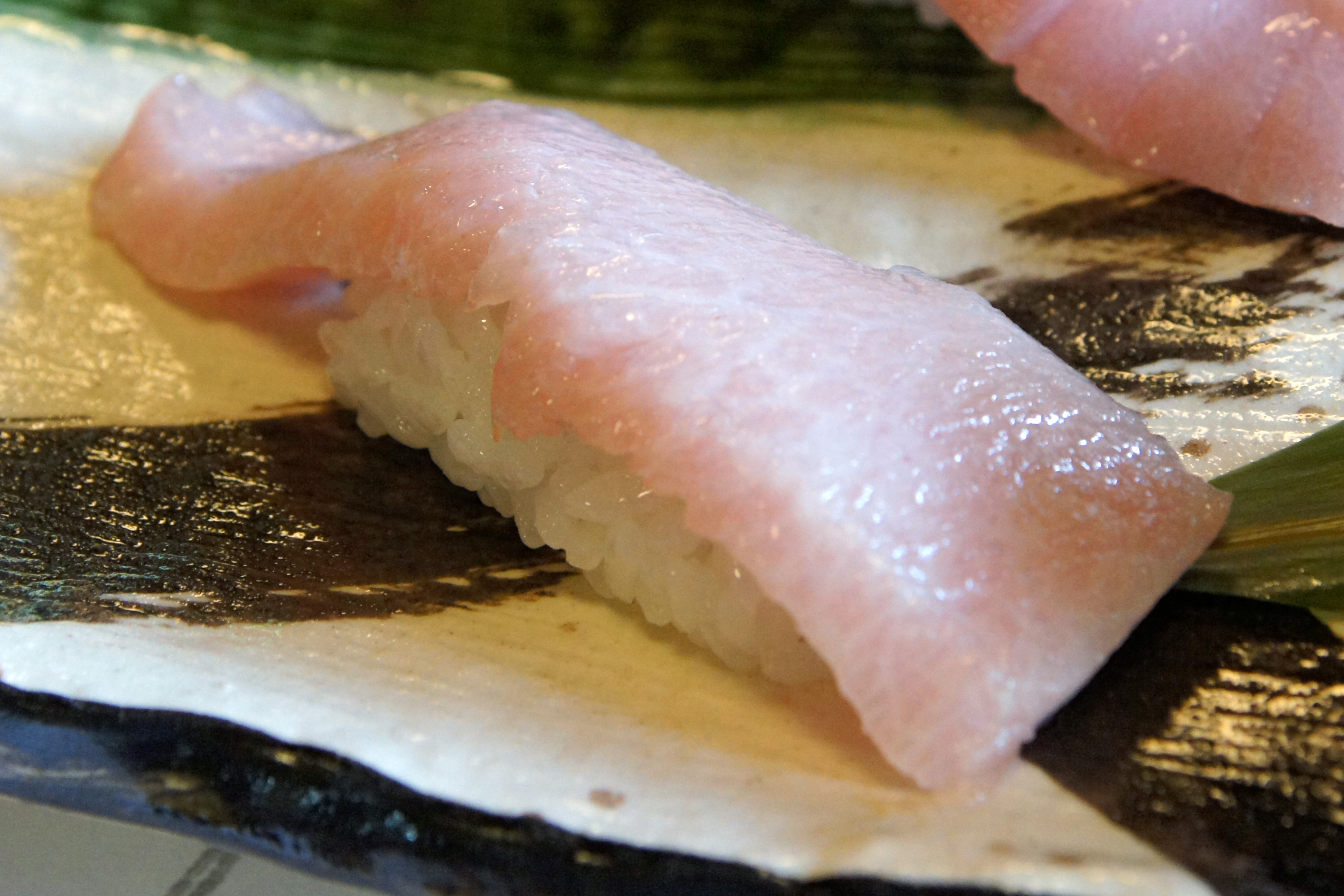
- Alternative names: fatty tuna
- Type: Fish
- Place of origin: Japan
- Region or state: Japan
- Associated cuisine: Toro sushi, Toro sashimi
- Created by: a customer at the Yoshino Sushi Honten
- Main ingredients: Toro

Toro (Japanese: トロ; ideophonic word for "melting") is the fatty meat of tuna served as sushi or sashimi. Toro, often abbreviated form of toro-keru, is one of two categories of Japanese tuna, otherwise known as maguro (マグロ or 鮪). The maguro counterpart, zuke (漬け), refers to raw lean tuna and is often marinated in soy sauce, mirin, and/or sake. Toro is usually cut from the belly or outer layers of the Pacific bluefin tuna (the other fish known for similar meat is bigeye tuna). The etymology of the name comes from the fact that the meat has a creamy texture. According to the Sushi: The Complete Guide (liberal translation of 鮓・鮨・すし-すしの事典) by Masuo Yosino, a customer at the Yoshino Sushi Honten named it as toro melts in your mouth.

== Toro popularity over time ==
Before the 19th century in the Edo period, tuna was transported from distant locations since these fish were not caught within proximity of Edo. The setback with tuna transportation during this period was that the meat often blackened due to oxygen exposure and lack of proper refrigeration. It wasn't until 1832, when fishermen amassed tuna in large quantities near Edo and a sushi shop owner received this abundance of tuna in Bakurocho, which led to tuna's rise in popularity as a part of sushi. It was originally marinated in soy sauce without the fatty components, and this was the introduction of tuna in sushi. Some Japanese historians attribute this method to Hanaya Yohei, restaurant manager and chef who invented Tokyo-style sushi during this period, who is believed to have utilized tuna's increasing popularity and incorporated it in nigirizushi. Because the fatty meat spoiled more quickly making it unsuitable for sushi and sashimi, it was instead used in dishes such as negima nabe (ねぎま鍋; hot pot with tuna and spring onions) which was sold very cheaply. It was of such low value that it was even called neko matagi (猫またぎ; lit. "cat step over") because it was said not even a cat would eat it.

This preference for the lean meat of tuna continued into the Shōwa era when freezing technology advanced, allowing the fatty meat to be transported long distances. In 1905, Japan adopted engine powered boats which allowed for fishermen to expand their fishing range in the ocean and thus enabled tuna to become a more prominent meat in Japanese menus. During World War II, toro was rationed during food shortages since it was easily accessible and an inexpensive source of red meat. Throughout post-war Japan, the Japanese diet included toro, as well as other fatty meats. In the 1960s, the demand for bluefin tuna increased as refrigeration technology became more accessible, allowing sufficient preservation. Due to this, tuna fisheries changed their target species from yellowfin tuna and albacore tuna to bluefin tuna instead.

As a result from the tuna's popularity, overfishing became a detrimental factor to the tuna population, requiring Japan to trade with the United States 1970s. North Atlantic bluefin tuna were discovered near Canada and New England, which the United States used to exchange for Japan's technology and electronics. As a Western-style diet began to spread, fattier meats became preferred due to their texture and flavor, which consumers associated with high energy density. In the late 20th century, fattier meats of all kinds are popularized which produced a correlation between higher wealth and an increased consumption of fattier meats. During this same time period from 1950 to the late 1980s, the fishing industry sky rocketed.

A shift in the image of tuna in the American eye began in 1983 when New York food critic Mimi Sheraton reviewed the Japanese restaurant Takezushi where she praised the "fatty tuna" that was served. This review along with the rise of a popular mini series at the time Shogun created an American willingness to explore and try Japanese cuisine. This can be an attributing factor to how even though in the 1990s, Japan's bluefin tuna imports stalled out, the western bluefin tuna market continued to hit new record highs. As of 1992, 700,000 tons of tuna (both lean and fatty) were consumed a year in Japan.

== Types of toro ==
Toro is subdivided into two grades. Grades are based on the location of the cut, and the cuts fat content. Generally, the more fat content a cut of tuna has, the more valuable it is. Fat content will vary based on the location the tuna was caught and the time of year in which the tuna was caught.

- Ōtoro (大トロ; "big toro") – very fatty cut from the tuna's underbelly area just behind the head, and the tuna's upper belly; tender and rich; around 40% fat; expensive and usually served on special occasions.
- Chūtoro (中トロ; "medium toro") – less fatty cut made from the areas closer to the tail; the fat content in the case of bigeye reaches 25%.
- Shimofuri (霜降り; "marbling") - Rarest cut of toro made within the belly and the collar area; the meat is marbled and has thin lines of fat; uncommonly served in common Japanese restaurants.
  - Akami (赤み; "Redness") - Found between the Chūtoro and Ōtoro; lean meat and easily identifiable by how Akami cuts are more red than other cuts due to the high muscle (lean) content; most common in American restaurants; lowest price cut of tuna; the muscle meat that is what propels the tuna; has a fat content of 14%.
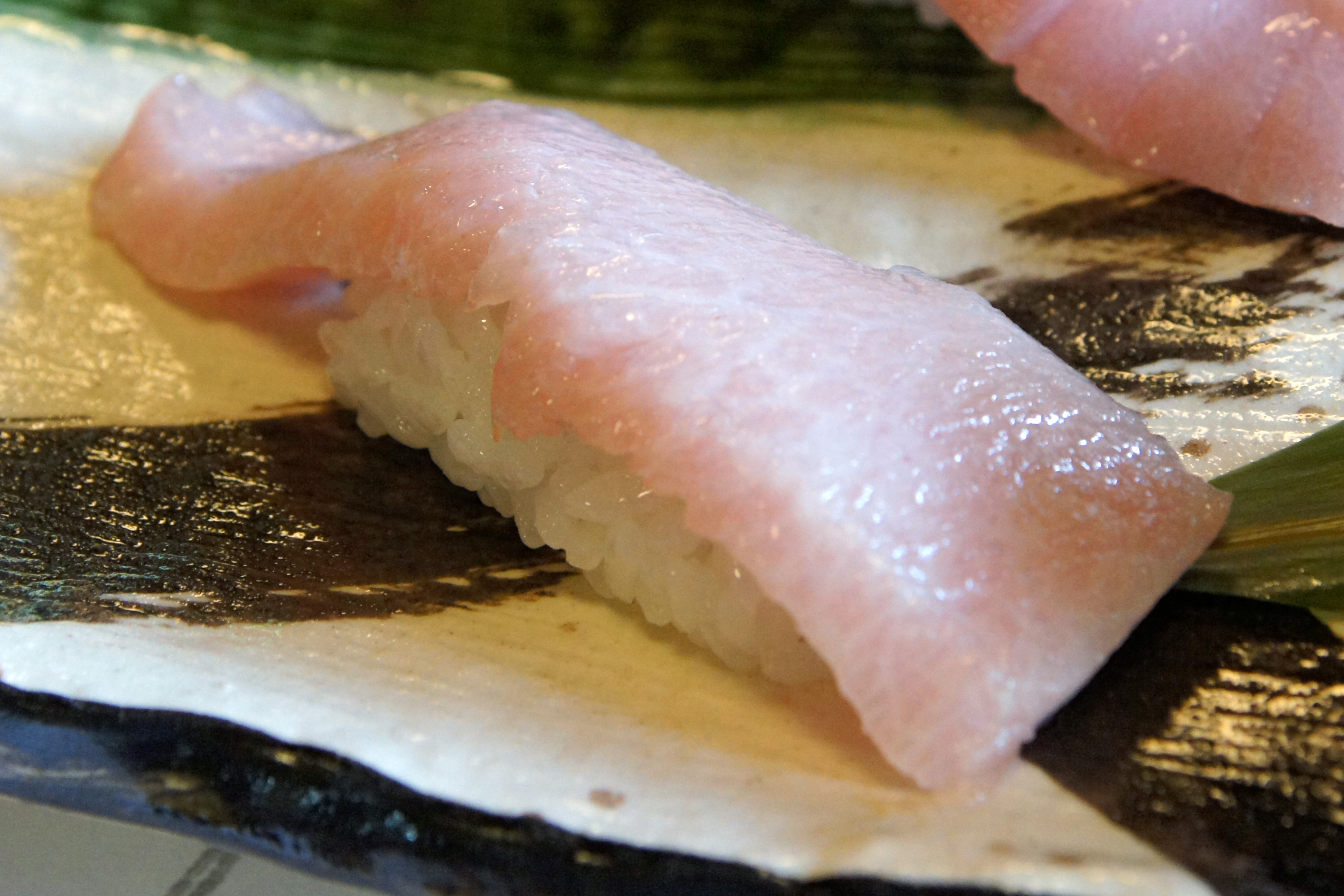
Ōtoro (very fatty toro)

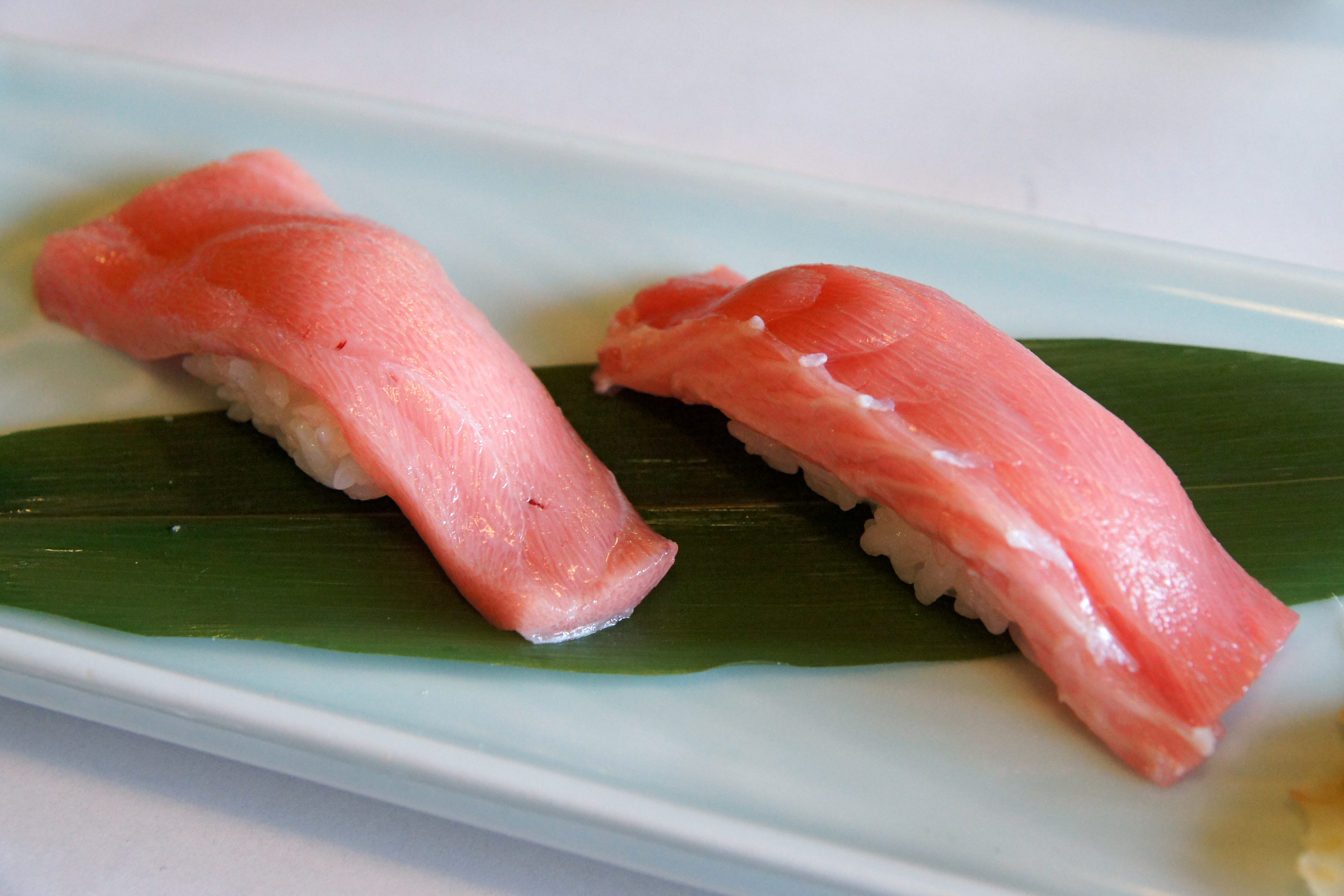
Chūtoro (medium fatty toro)

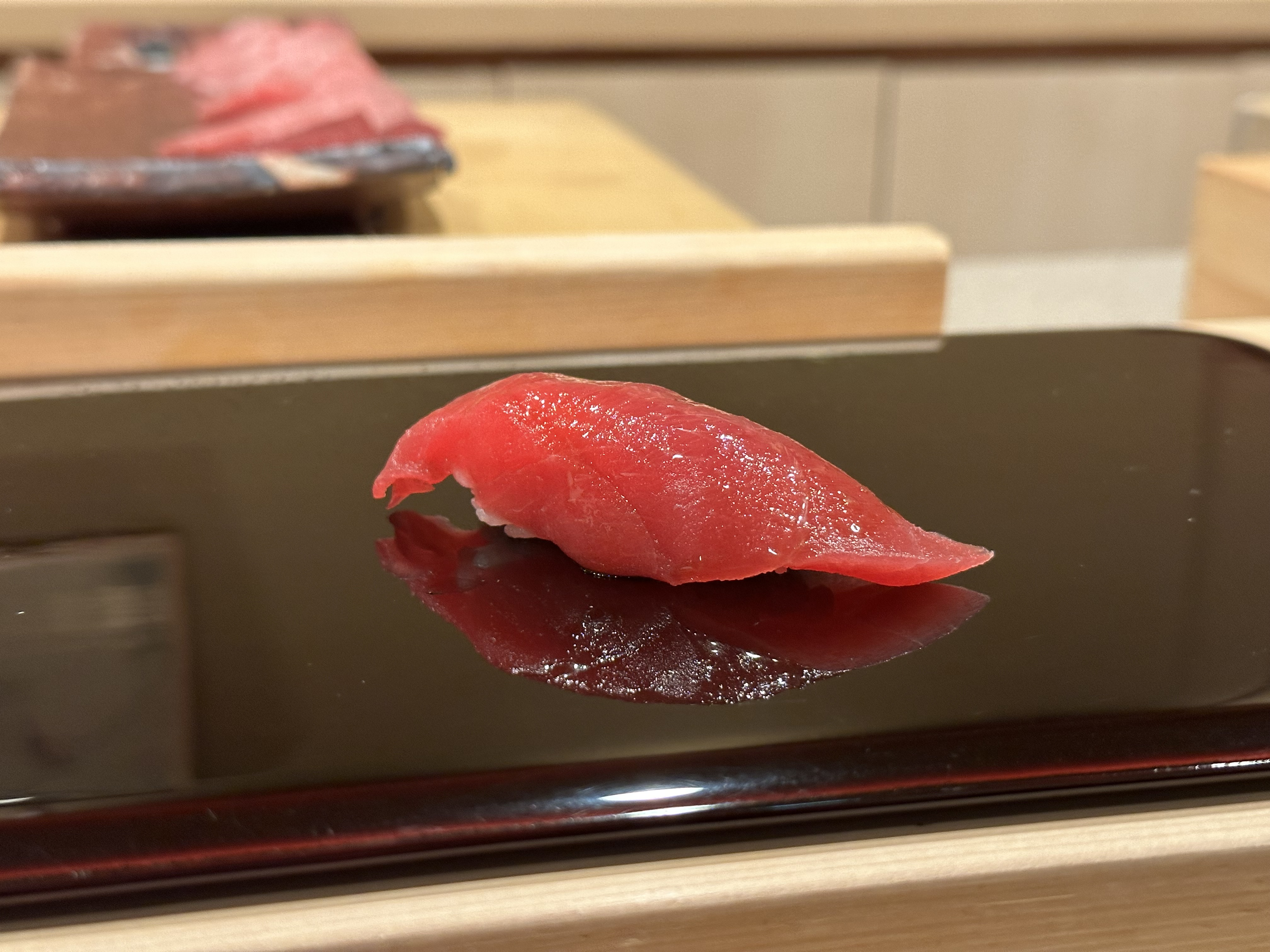
Akami (lean tuna)

The meat from the inner layers of the fish, called akami (赤身), is more reddish and has less fat (with 14% fat in bigeye).

== Production of toro ==
Toro from wild tuna is a seasonal product: winter tuna is considered to be better, summer one is less fatty.

Except for the tuna fish, other fatty fish can be called "toro". For instance:

1. the fatty part of skipjack tuna sashi.
2. In Hokkaido, the local rice bowl is called "Nama Gyudon”, which uses raw beef.
3. A pork which called "Pork buri"

There is no exact boundary for "toro" to define the type of the meat. It is used as the sales strategy, using the image of toro is luxury. This is evident in its boom in the US during the 1970s as well. In 1972, the Harvard club in New York City opened a sushi bar which further promotes toro as an item and symbol of luxury not only in Japan but in the US as well. Toro was also viewed as a symbol of wealth in the US due to the price of the quality of seafood. Most tuna caught on the eastern coast of the US with the intention to be consumed as sushi are shipped to Japan first where they will then be purchased by a Tsukiji sushi exporter that can validate the cuts before they get shipped elsewhere for consumption. Nowadays the tuna are bought by the Toyosu Fish Market in Japan as opposed to Tsukiji however the practice is the same. Due to these practices, the price for the highest grade toro jumps high and is primarily consumed by guests looking to enjoy the best cuts of tuna while also expressing their wealth. Except for tuna, other fatty fishes can be called toro too.

Since toro has increased in price in the modern age, some cooks cut down on the expense with a more affordable substitute that consists of fish trimmings marinated in vegetable oil or margarine.

Negitoro is a Japanese dish composed of toro and green onion and is commonly made as sushi rolls and as a rice bowl topping.

== General and cited references ==
- Van Kampen-Lewis, Stephen (August 2008). An analytical approach to likely sources of distribution for a hypothetical tuna farm based in Hawaii (M.B.A. thesis). University of Hawaii at Manoa.
- Ashenden, Geoffrey P.; Kitson, Graham W. (1987). The Japan tuna market. Pacific Islands Development Program.
- Bergin, A.; Haward, M.G. (1996). Japan's Tuna Fishing Industry: A Setting Sun Or New Dawn? (in Malay). Nova Science Publishers. ISBN 978-1-56072-241-0.
- Shoji, Tosuke (March 1972). Study on the Economic Effect of the Investment for Modernistic Equipment in Japanese Far Sea Tuna Industries (PDF). National Marine Fisheries Service.
