= Bakurochō =

Bakurochō (馬喰町) may refer to:

- Nihonbashi Bakurochō
- Bakurochō Station
