= 2007 Chuo mayoral election =

Chūō, Tokyo held a mayoral election on April 15, 2007 as part of the 2007 unified elections. Incumbent mayor Yada Yoshihide, was re-elected.

== Candidates ==
- Yada Yoshihide, long-time mayor of Chūō backed by the Liberal Democratic Party and Komeito.
- Satou Tatsuo, representative for the Tsukiji fish market and backed by the Japanese Communist Party.

== Results ==
Mayoral election 2007: Chūō City
Party	Candidate	Votes	%	±%
LDP, Komeito	Yada Yoshihide	28,458		
JCP	Satou Tatsuo	9,990		
Turnout		40,152	46.70%	
