= Chūō, Tokyo =

Special ward in Tokyo, Japan

Chūō 中央区
- Special ward
- Chūō City
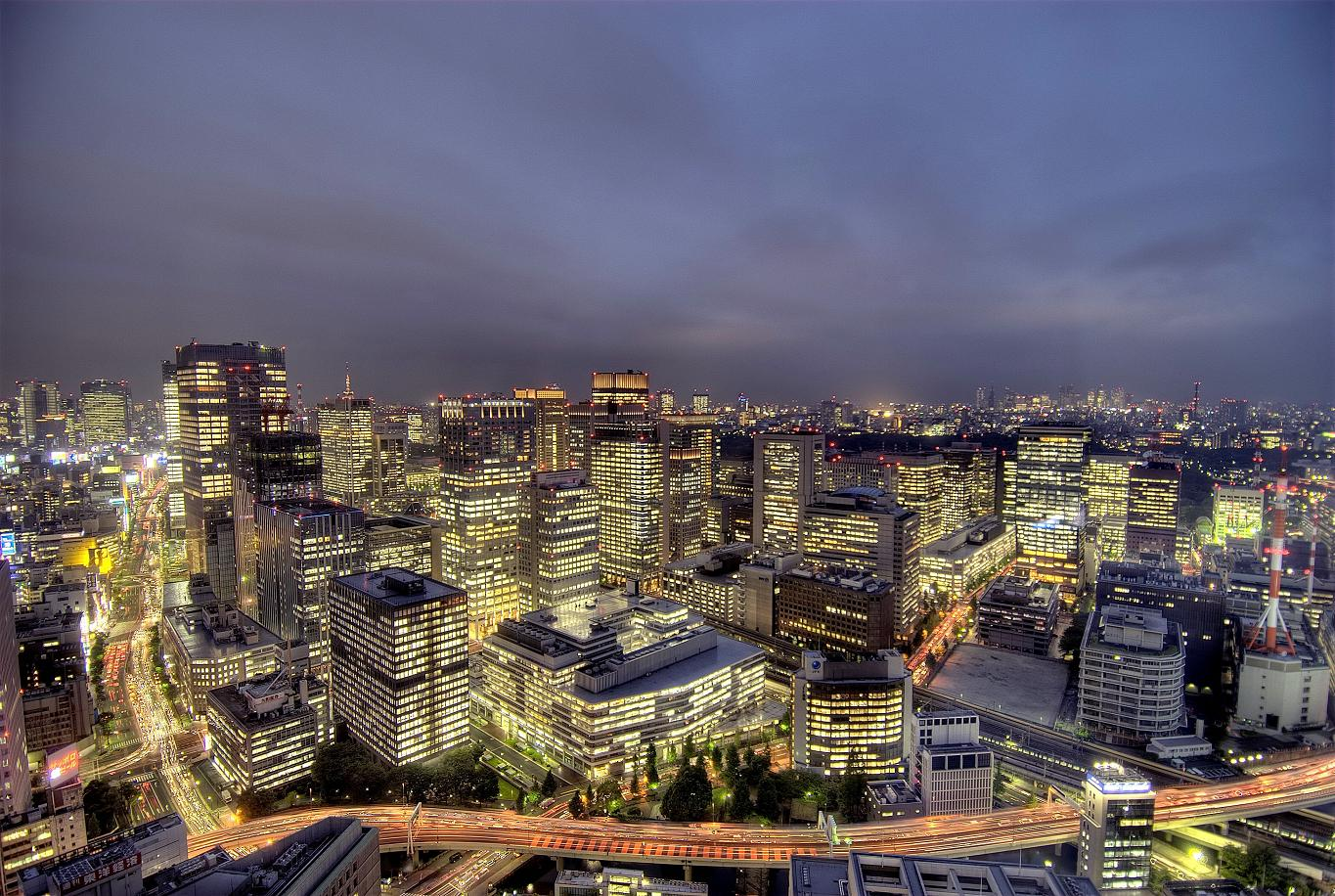
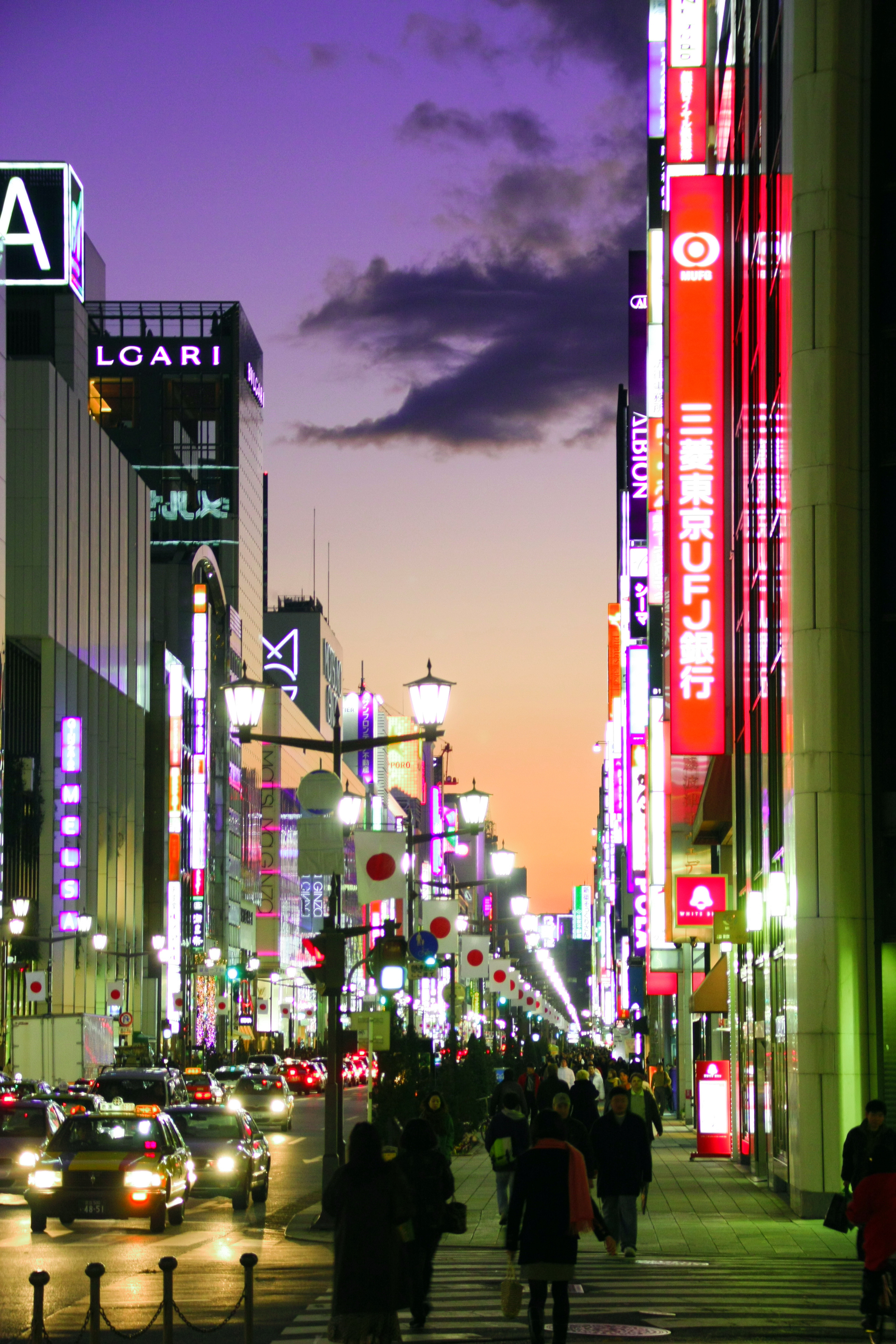
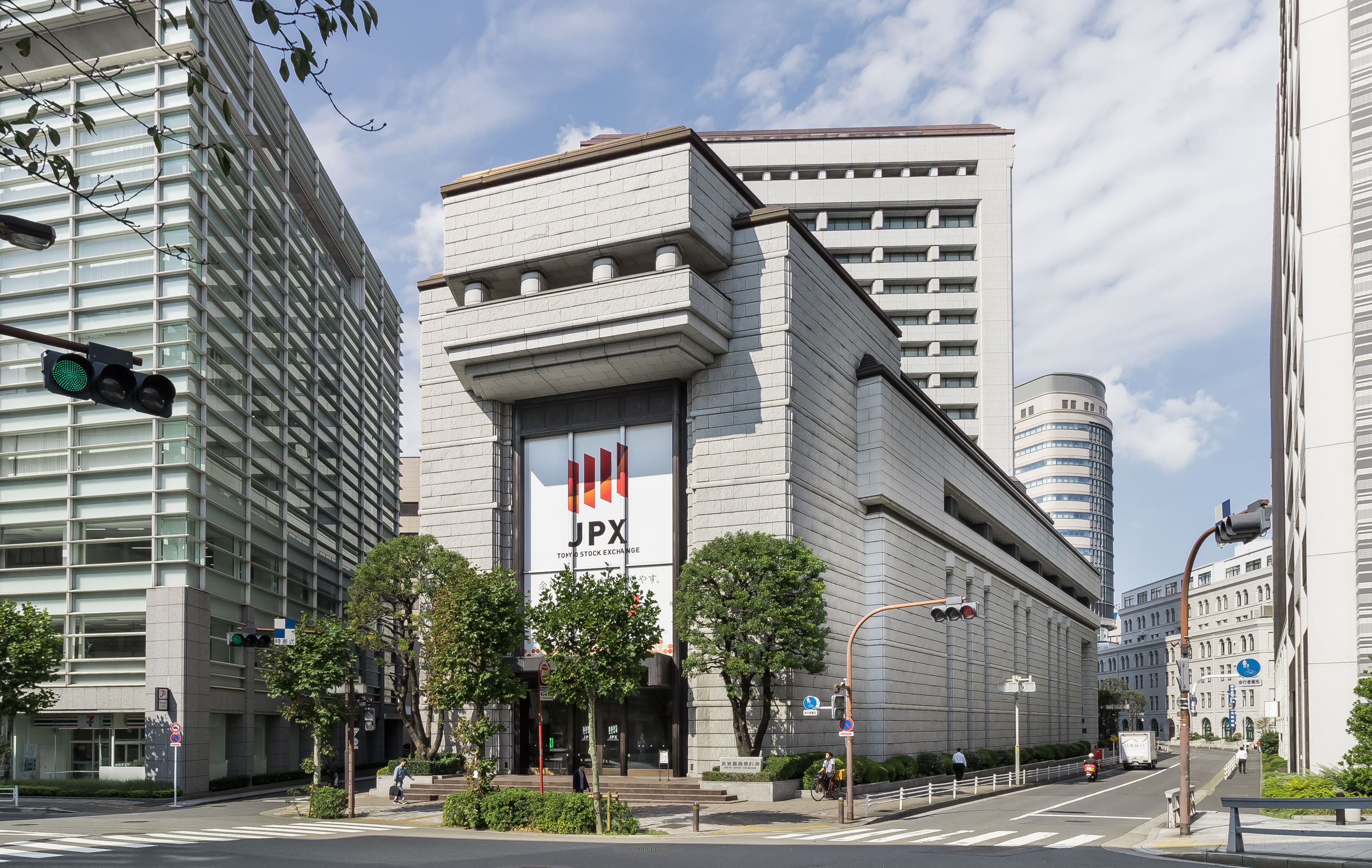
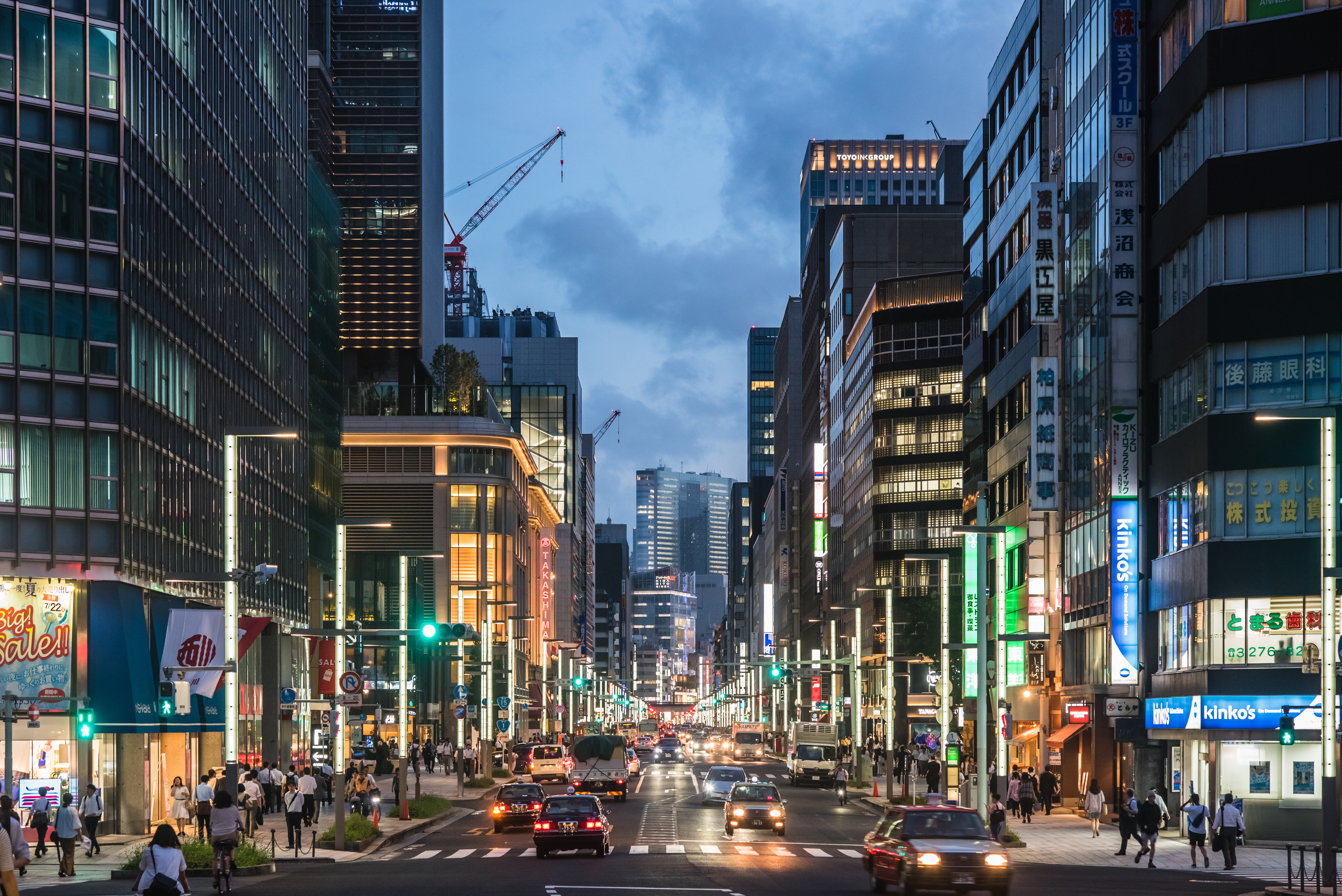
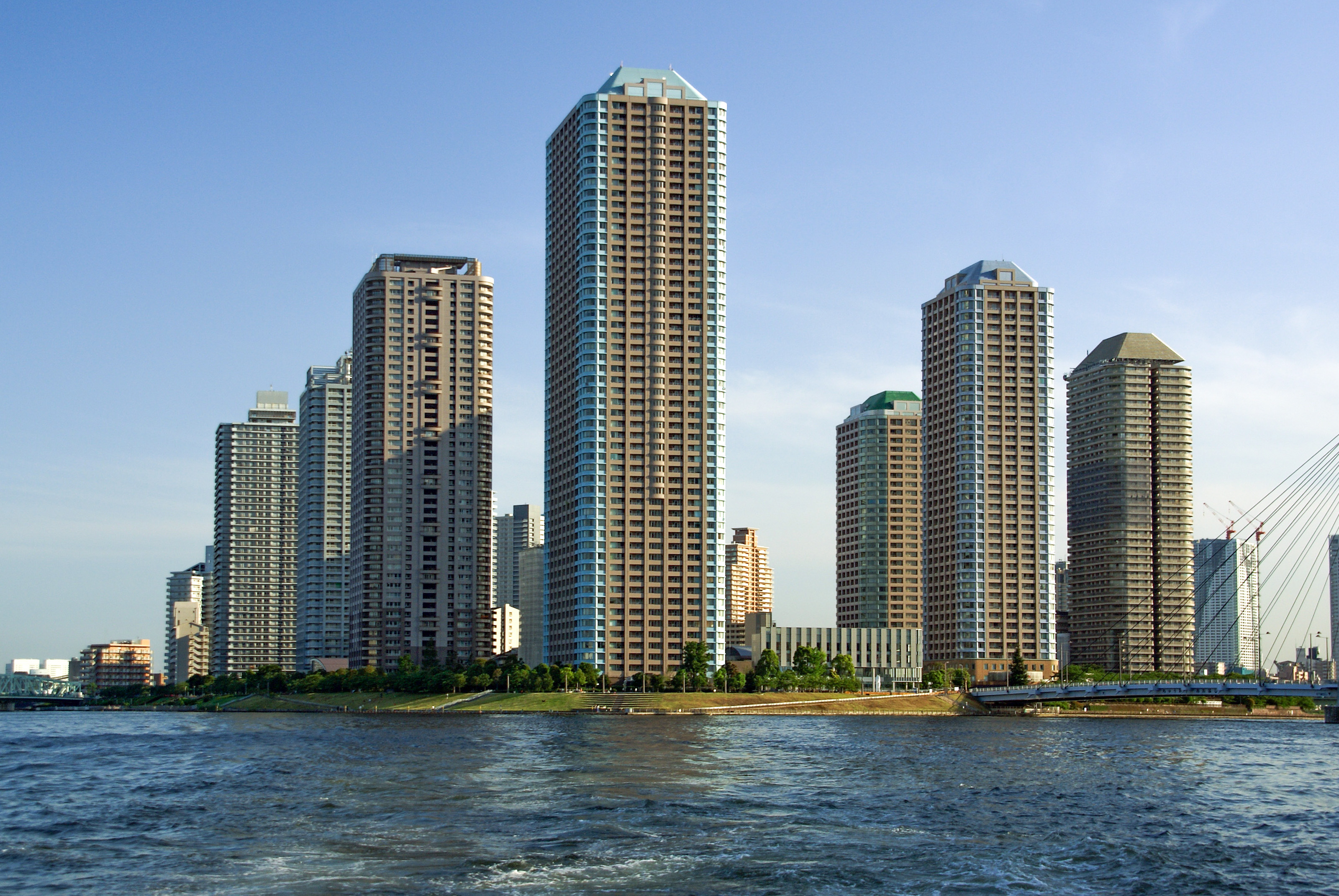
- Nihonbashi and Yaesu in 2008 Ginza Tokyo Stock Exchange Nihonbashi Condominiums by the Sumida River

- Flag Emblem

- Location of Chūō in Tokyo Metropolis

- Location in Japan
- Coordinates: 35°40′N 139°46′E
- Country: Japan
- Region: Kantō
- Prefecture: Tokyo Metropolis

Government
  - Mayor: Taito Yamamoto

Area
  - Total: 10.21 km^{2} (3.94 sq mi)

Population (October 1, 2020)
  - Total: 169,179
  - Density: 16,569/km^{2} (42,910/sq mi)
- Time zone: UTC+09:00 (JST)
- City hall address: Tsukiji 1-1-1 Chuo-ku, Tokyo; 104-8404
- Website: www.city.chuo.lg.jp
- Symbols
- Flower: Azalea
- Tree: Willow

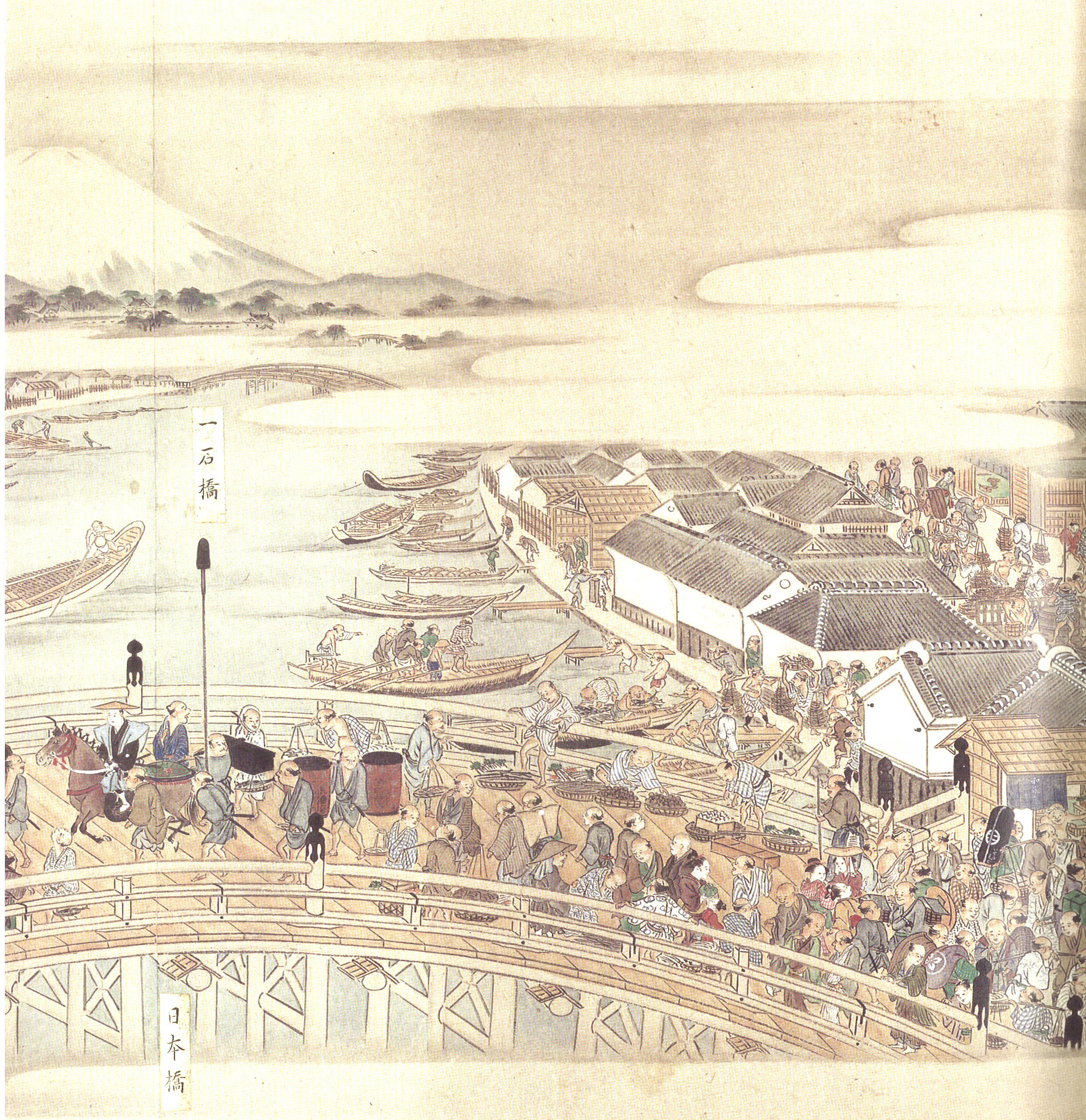
Nihonbashi in the Edo period

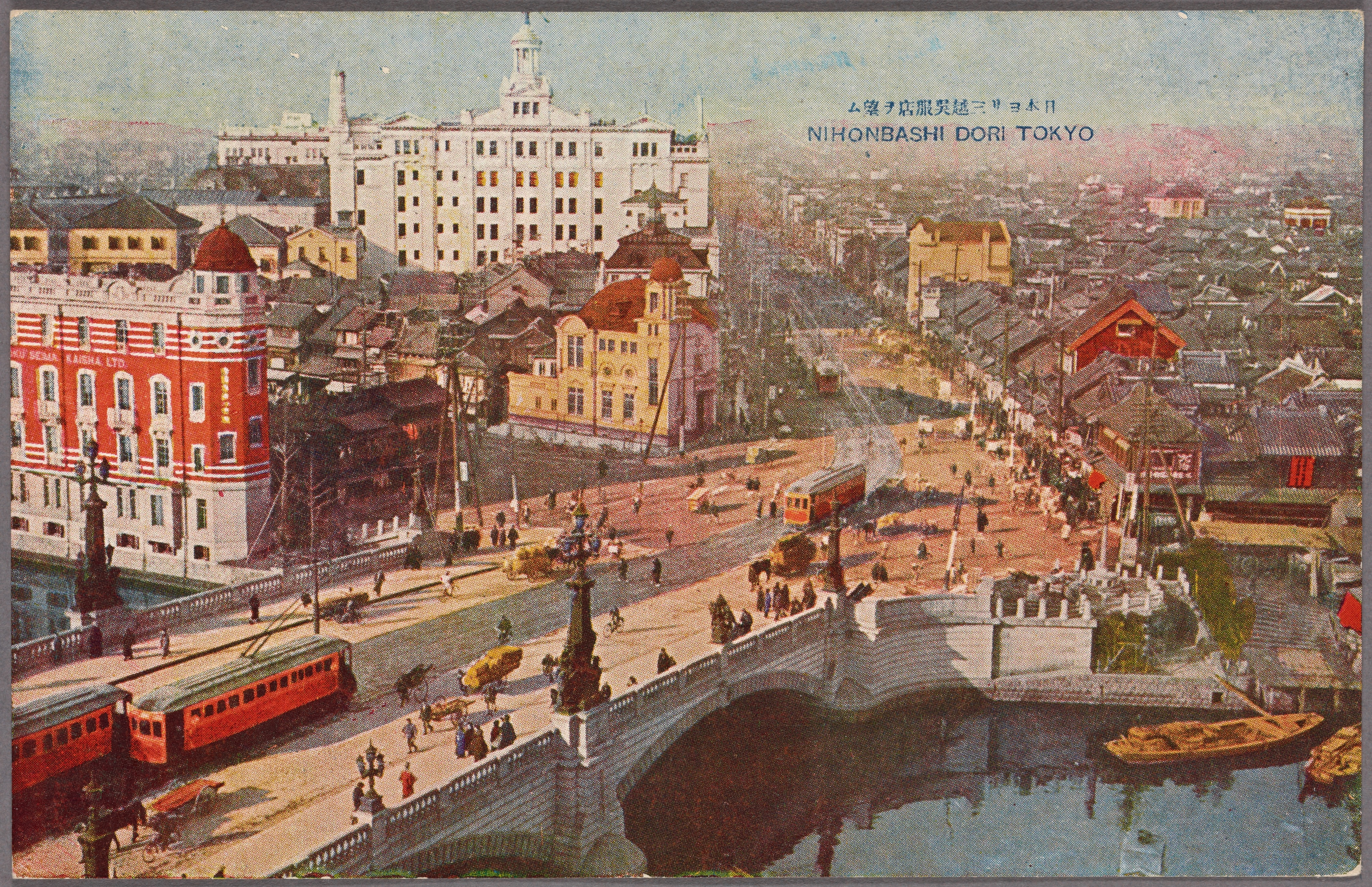
Nihonbashi in 1922

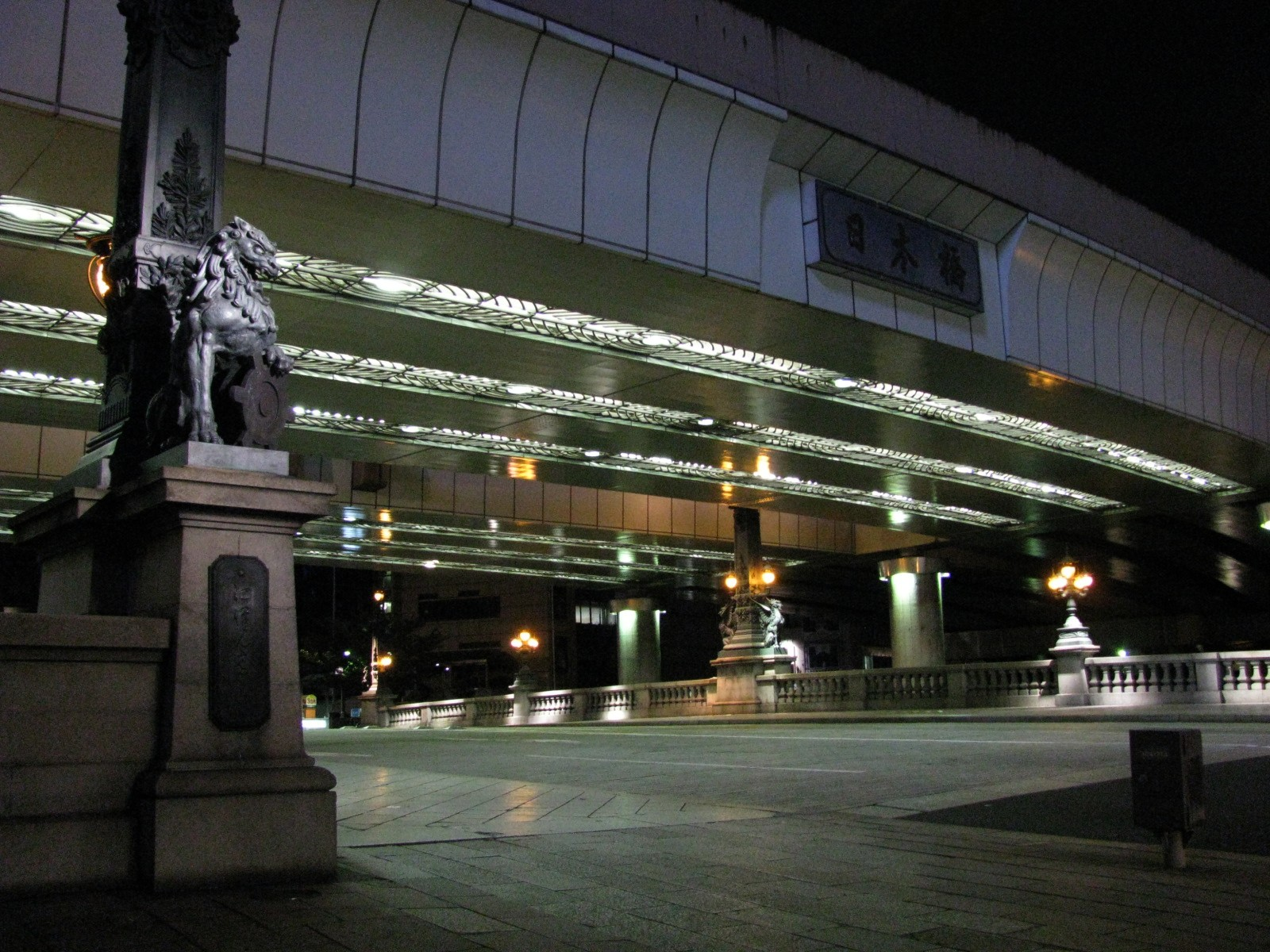
Night in Nihonbashi

Chūō (中央区, Chūō-ku; Japanese pronunciation: [c̟͡ɕɨ̀ɨ́.ó̞ò̞(.kɯ̈̀), -ó̞ó̞, c̟͡ɕɨ́ɨ́-]) is a special ward in the Tokyo Metropolis in Japan. The ward refers to itself in English as Chūō City. It was formed in 1947 as a merger of Kyōbashi and Nihonbashi wards following Tokyo City's transformation into Tokyo Metropolis.

Chūō-ku, as a combination of Kyōbashi and Nihonbashi, is the core of Shitamachi, the original downtown center of Edo-Tokyo. The name Chūō literally means "Central Ward," and it has historically been Tokyo’s main commercial center. However, since the end of World War II, Shinjuku and Shibuya in the west have risen to challenge that position. This is reflected in the fact that Chūō is located entirely outside the Yamanote Line loop, which is now regarded as the inner core of central Tokyo.

Among most known districts in Chūō are the Nihonbashi business district, the Ginza shopping district, and the Tsukiji market district.

As of October 1, 2020, the ward has a resident population of 169,179, and a population density of 16,569 persons per km^{2}. The total area is 10.21 km^{2}. However, because of the concentration of businesses, offices and retail space, the daytime population swells to an estimated 650,000.

== Geography ==
Chūō is in the central area of Tokyo, surrounded by the five special wards of Chiyoda, Minato, Taitō, Sumida, and Kōtō.

Administratively, Chūō is divided into the three zones of Nihonbashi, Kyōbashi and Tsukishima. Nihonbashi and Kyōbashi are predominantly commercial areas on the east side of Tokyo Station, and incorporate the famous districts of Ginza and Tsukiji. Tsukishima is a separate island in Tokyo Bay dominated by condominium towers.

Until World War II, the area was crisscrossed by small rivers and canals, used by small boats which were the primary vehicles of commerce at the time. After the war, many of these waterways were filled in to make way for new roads, buildings and expressways. However, the former waterways are the basis for many of the neighborhood divisions in the ward. The Sumida River forms the eastern boundary of the ward.

Chūō is physically the second-smallest ward in Tokyo, with a total area of just 10.15 km^{2}; only Taitō is smaller.

== History ==
- 1612: Shōgun Tokugawa Ieyasu, planning to establish Edo as the de facto capital of Japan, begins work on a new commercial district surrounding the eastern end of the Tōkaidō, the main road connecting Tokyo and the Kansai region. During the Edo period this area is known as Edomachi—the town center of Edo. Much of the area (particularly Ginza and Tsukiji) was loose sand piled at the delta of the Sumida River before being filled in by the shogunate.
- 1657: After a fire consumes much of the city, the area is re-planned with more canals to accommodate more maritime commerce.
- 1869: A foreigners' settlement is established in Tsukiji. It continues until about 1899.
- 1872: A fire consumes much of the Ginza area. In its aftermath, the governor of Tokyo re-plans Ginza to be a modern European-style commercial district between Shinbashi (the city's main railway terminal at the time) to the south and Nihonbashi (the main business and financial district) to the north.
- 1878: Under a new local organization statute, the wards of Nihonbashi and Kyōbashi are established under the government of Tokyo City, covering the area now occupied by Chūō.
- 1945: Following Japan's defeat in World War II, several buildings are taken over by SCAP to serve as supply centers for the occupation forces. These include the Hattori Watch Company, the Matsuya department store and the Toshiba Building. The buildings are returned to Japanese civilian control by 1951.
- 1947: Chūō Ward is founded on March 15 under the new Local Autonomy Law, merging the former Nihonbashi and Kyōbashi wards.

== Districts and neighborhoods ==
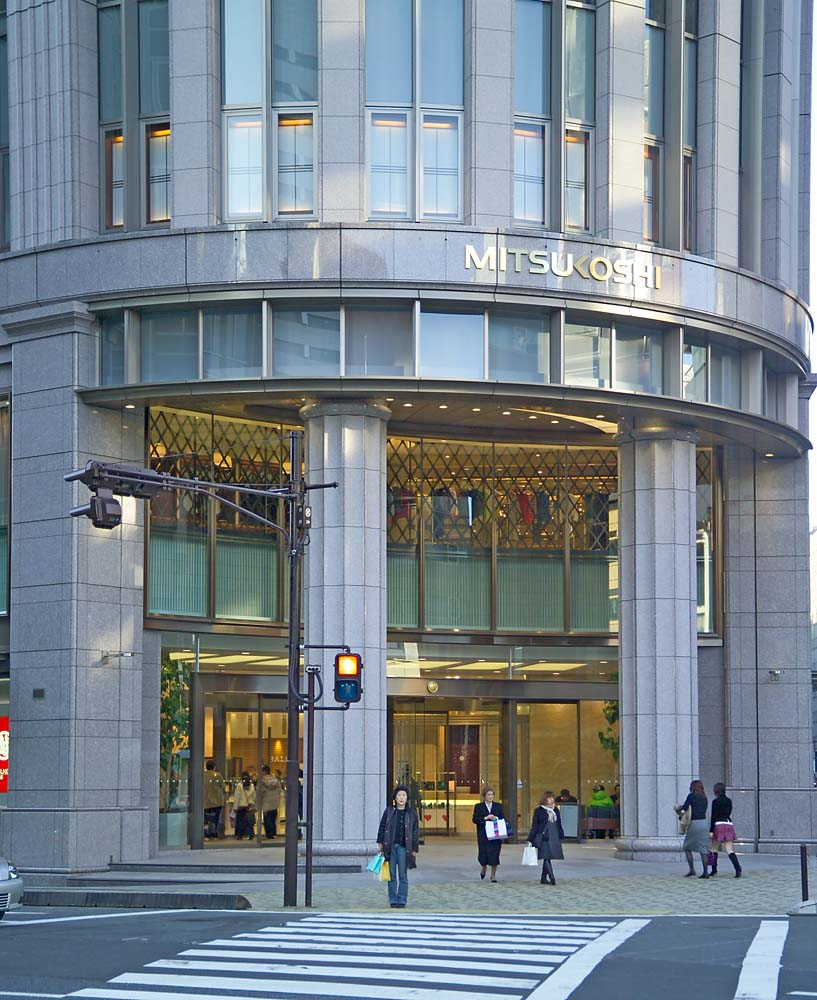
Mitsukoshi Department Store

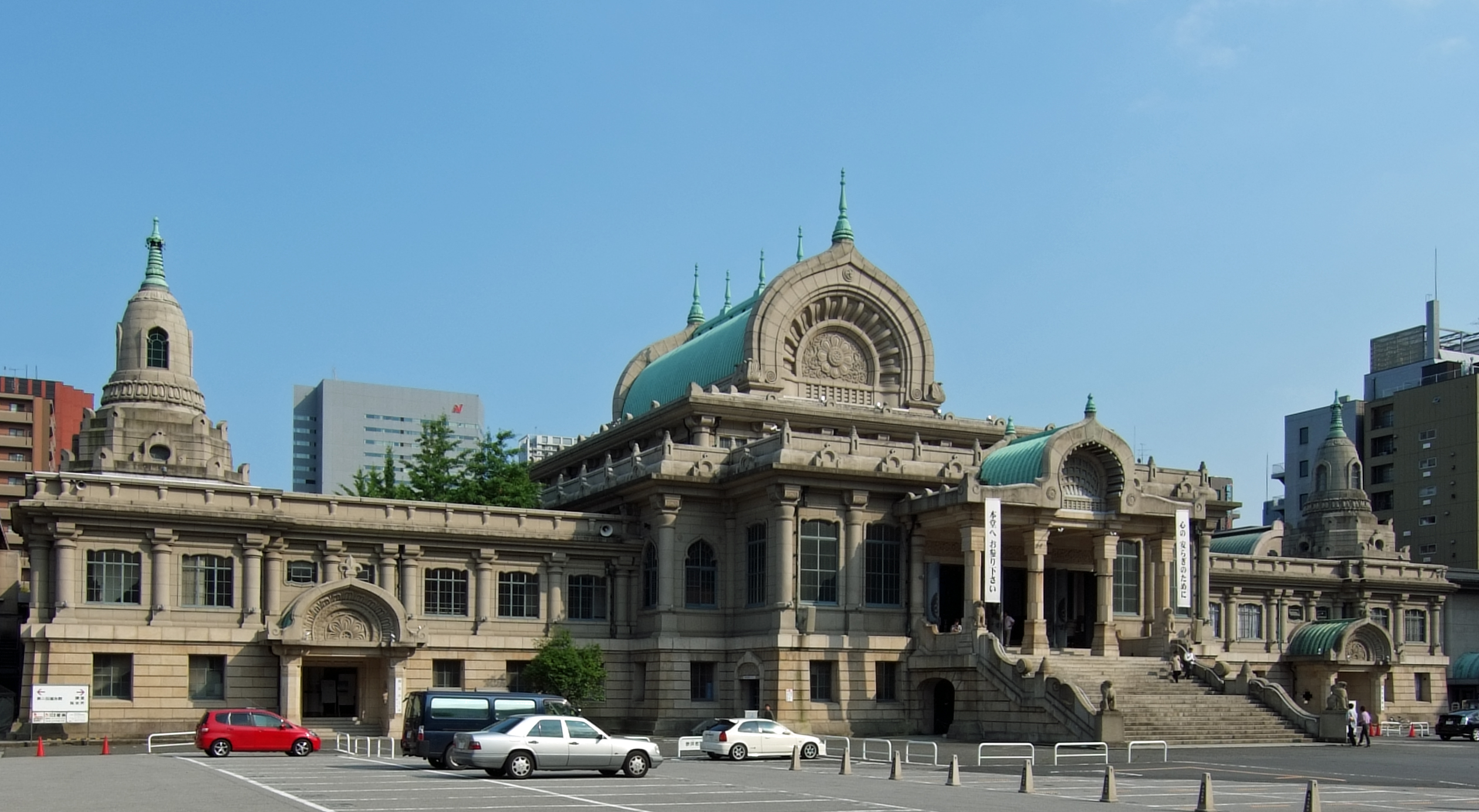
Tsukiji Hongwanji

=== Nihonbashi area (日本橋地区) ===
- Bakurochō (馬喰町)
- Hakozakicho (箱崎町): Location of Tokyo City Air Terminal (T-CAT)
- Hamacho (浜町)
  - Arashio stable (荒汐部屋): Stable of professional sumo wrestlers
- Higashi-Nihonbashi (東日本橋)
- Hisamatsucho (久松町)
- Honcho (本町)
- Hongokucho (本石町): Location of Bank of Japan (日本銀行).
- Horidomecho (堀留町)
- Kabutocho (兜町): The securities district. Location of Tokyo Stock Exchange.
- Kakigaracho (蛎殻町)
  - Suitengu Shrine (水天宮): A Shinto shrine at which women pray for conception and safe birth.
- Kayabacho (茅場町)
- Koamicho
- Kobunacho
- Kodenmacho (小伝馬町)
- Muromachi (室町): Location of Mitsukoshi (三越) department stores.
- Nakasu
- Nihonbashi (日本橋): Traditional commercial center. Also home to the Takashimaya (高島屋) department stores, and the "zero milestone" from which highway distances to Tokyo are measured.
- Ningyocho (人形町)
- Odenmacho (大伝馬町)
- Tomizawacho (富沢町)
- Yokoyamacho (横山町)

=== Kyōbashi area (京橋地区) ===
- Akashicho (明石町): Home to St. Luke's Hospital and Nursing School and the adjacent Garden Tower skyscraper.
- Ginza (銀座): Tokyo's most expensive shopping district, housing large stores such as Matsuya (松屋), Matsuzakaya (松坂屋), Mitsukoshi (三越), Wako (和光), and Printemps (プランタン), as well as the famous Kabuki-za (歌舞伎座) theater. At night, Ginza is ablaze with neon lights. Exclusive bars abound.
  - Shinbashi Enbujō (新橋演舞場): A famous theater
- Hamarikyu-teien (浜離宮庭園): Location of Hama-rikyū Gardens (浜離宮恩賜庭園). A spacious public park, formerly the property of daimyō of Kōshū, and later under the administration of the Imperial Household Agency
- Hatchobori (八丁堀): During the Edo period, the location of the police barracks
- Irifune (入船)
- Kyōbashi (京橋)
- Minato (harbor) (湊)
- Shinkawa (新川)
  - Eitai Bridge (永代橋): A bridge across the Sumida River (隅田川)
- Shintomi (新富)
- Tsukiji (築地): Location of Chūō City Office. Widely viewed as one of the best sushi (寿司) destinations in the world because of its huge wholesale fish market, which supplies restaurants and stores across eastern Japan. Also home to the Jōdo Shinshū temple of Tsukiji Hongan-ji (築地本願寺).
- Yaesu (八重洲): District on the east side of Tokyo Station (東京駅). The Yaesu side of Tokyo Station is the terminal for the Shinkansen (新幹線) "bullet train" lines.

=== Tsukishima area (月島地区) ===
- Harumi (晴海): the Harumi passenger terminal is here
- Kachidoki (勝どき): The location of a bridge of the same name over the Sumida River
- Toyomicho (豊海町)
- Tsukishima (月島); Famous for many Monjayaki restaurants
- Tsukuda (佃)
  - Sumiyoshi Shrine (住吉神社): A Shinto shrine with a history dating back to 1590

== Demographics ==
Per Japanese census data, the population has doubled since 2000 after decades of continuous rapid decline.

Historical population
Year	Pop.	±%
1908	235,103	—
1920	269,812	+14.8%
1930	239,533	−11.2%
1940	244,046	+1.9%
1945	76,220	−68.8%
1950	161,925	+112.4%
1960	161,299	−0.4%
1970	103,850	−35.6%
1980	82,700	−20.4%
1990	68,041	−17.7%
2000	72,526	+6.6%
2010	122,762	+69.3%
2020	169,179	+37.8%
2025	184,132	+8.8%
Source: Censuses (Note: For populations prior to 1950, the combined data for the two former wards of Nihonbashi-ku and Kyōbashi-ku within Tokyo City are calculated.)

== Economy ==
Ricoh is headquartered in the Ricoh Building in Chūō. The company moved its headquarters to the 25-story building in the Ginza area in Chūō from Minato, Tokyo in 2006. In the building the headquarters occupies the same space as its sales offices. Sumitomo Corporation is headquartered in the Harumi Island Triton Square Office Tower Y in Chūō. Daiichi Sankyo, a global pharmaceutical company is also headquartered in the ward, in the Daiichi Sankyo Building. Oji Paper Holdings and Hokuetsu Corporation, two pulp and paper manufacturing companies have their headquarters in Ginza and Nihonbashihongoku, respectively. J. Front Retailing has its headquarters in Yaesu. Asahi Shimbun, Mitsui E&S, and Nihon Ad Systems have their headquarters in Tsukiji. Ajinomoto, Mitsui Fudosan, Shinsei Bank, Nomura Group and Meidi-Ya are also headquartered in the ward. Shimizu Corporation and Sumitomo Mitsui Construction, two construction companies are headquartered in the ward, the former in Kyōbashi and the latter in Tsukuda district. Orion Breweries and Takeda Pharmaceutical Company have their Tokyo-area offices in Chūō. Toray Industries, Denka and Kureha Corporation, three global chemical companies; Astellas Pharma, a global pharmaceutical company; KOSÉ, a personal care and cosmetics company; Nisshinbo Holdings, a diversified manufacturing company; and Akebono Brake Industry, an automobile component manufacturer have their headquarters in the Nihonbashi area of the ward. Sumitomo Chemical is also headquartered in the ward, in the Kyōbashi area. MODEC, a global supplier and operator of offshore floating platforms, T. Hasegawa, a flavors and fragrances company, and Nissan Chemical Corporation, have their corporate headquarters in the Nihonbashi district.

=== Foreign operations ===
IBM has its Japan headquarters in Chūō.

=== Former economic operations ===
Dai-ichi Kikaku Senden Co., Ltd. opened in Chūō in Ginza, Chūō in December 1951. In January 1958 the company relocated to a new headquarters in Ginza. The company moved to another headquarters in Ginza in September 1961 and its name changed to Dai-ichi Kikaku Co. Ltd. In November 1974, after growth, the company moved to another headquarters in Ginza. In November 1981 Dai-ichi Kikaku moved its head office to a facility in Ginza and a facility in Uchisaiwaichō, Chiyoda. The headquarters of Asatsu moved to Ginza in July 1995. Asatsu and Dai-ichi Kikaku merged into Asatsu-DK on January 1, 1999.

In the late 1990s GeoCities Japan was headquartered in the Nihonbashi Hakozaki Building in Nihonbashi.

Tokyopop maintained its Japanese headquarters in Mid-Tower of the Tokyo Towers.

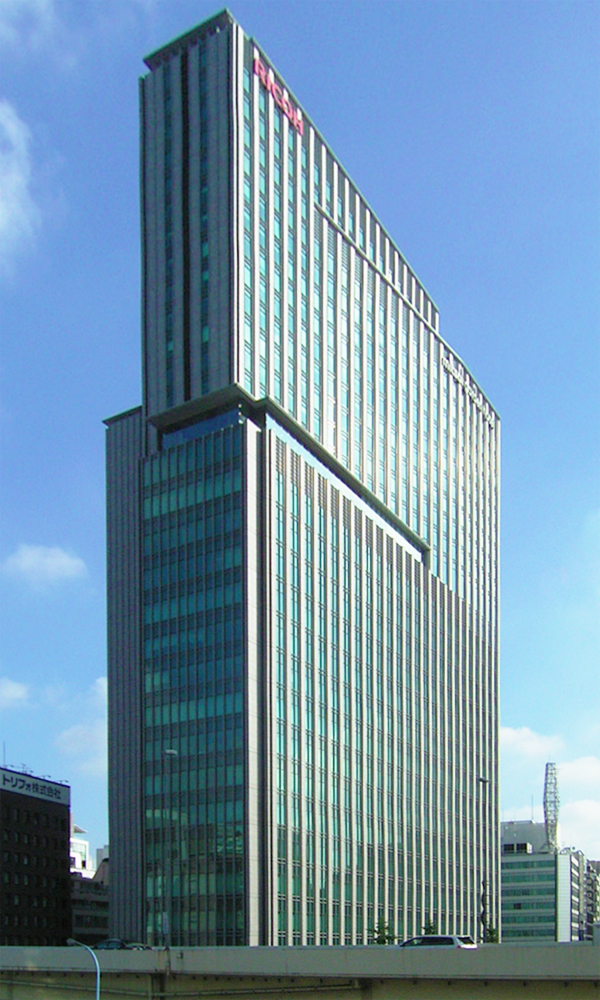
Ricoh Building

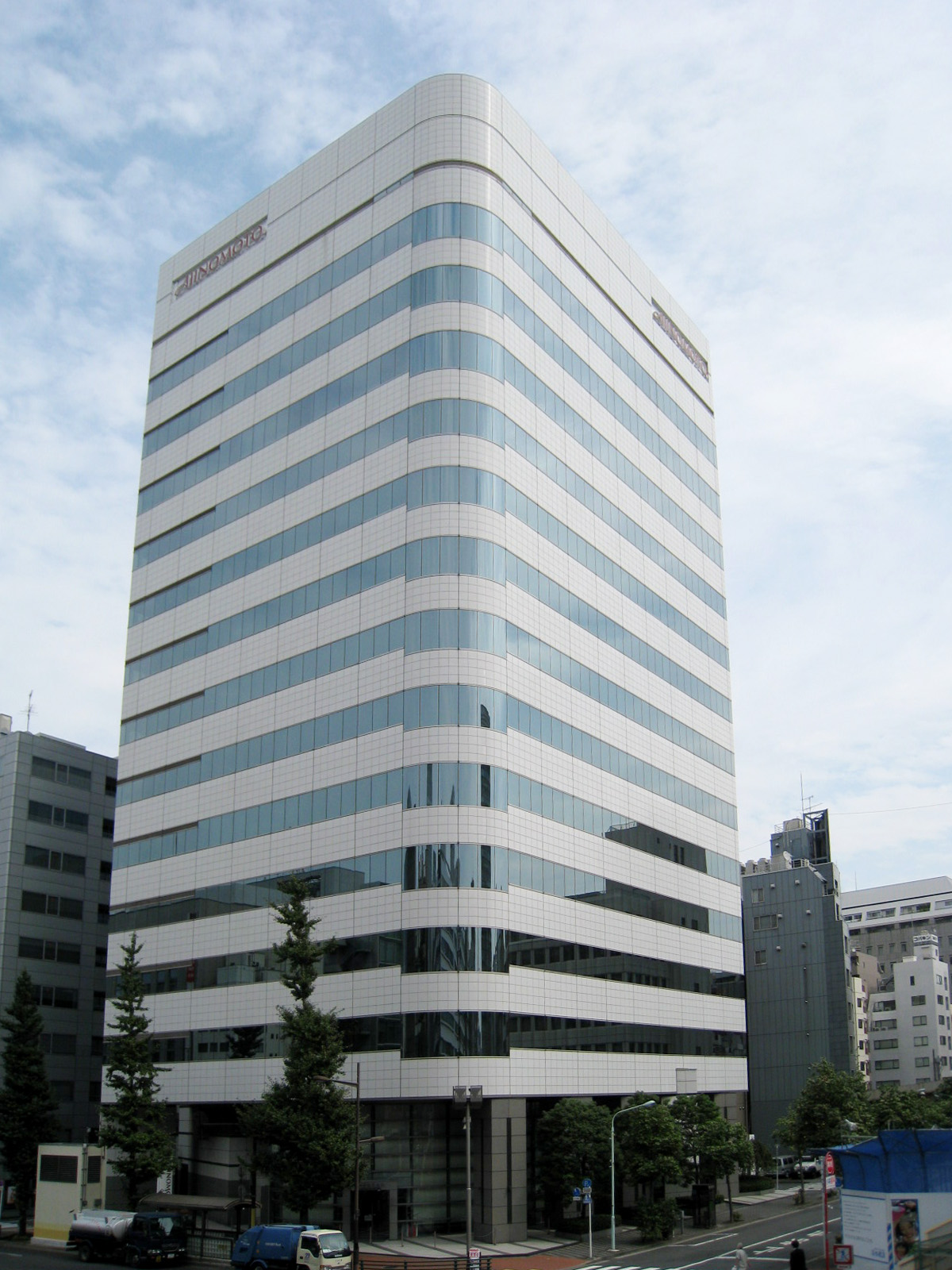
Ajinomoto headquarters

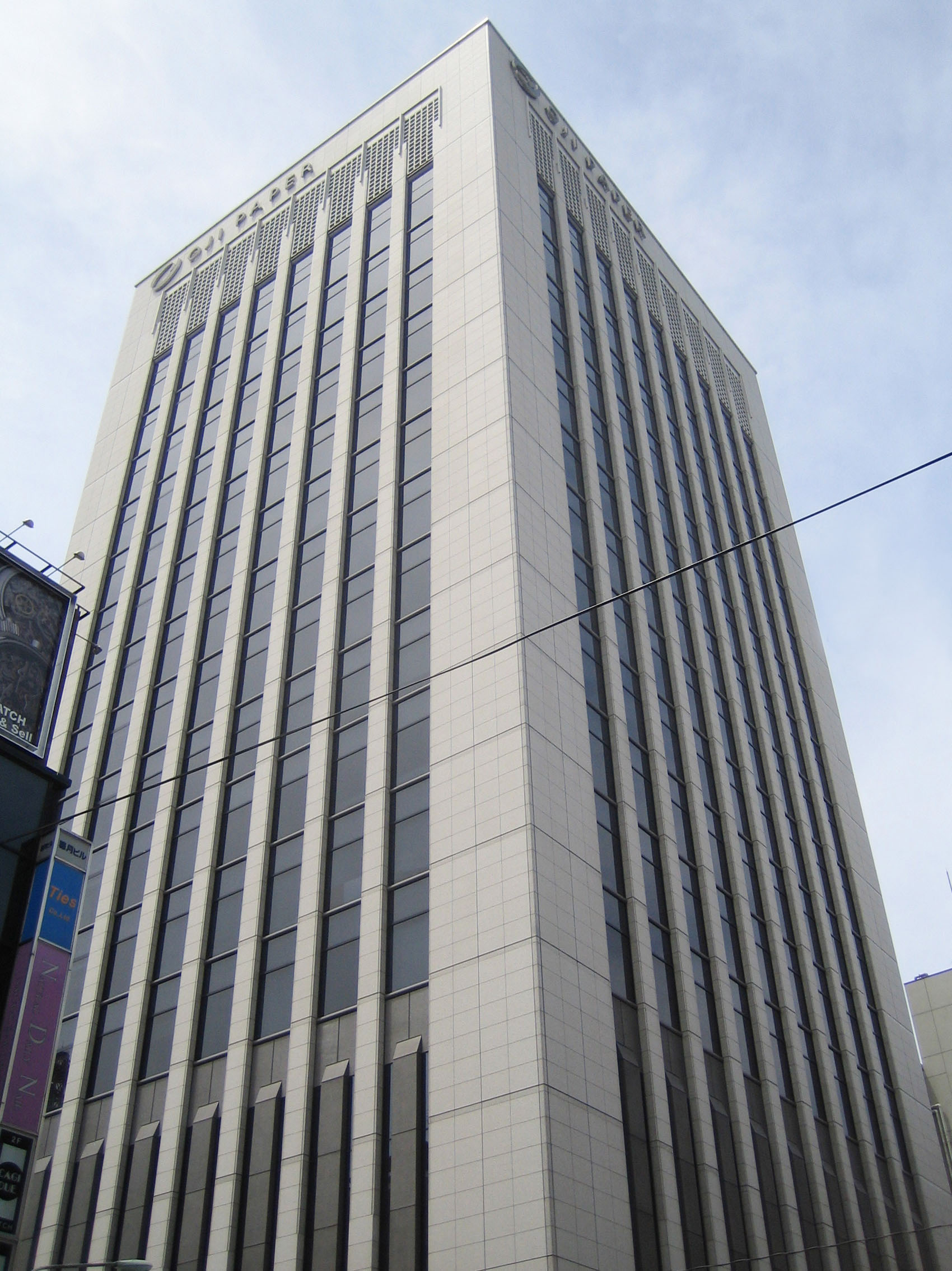
Oji Paper Holdings headquarters

== Politics and government ==
Chuo is run by a city assembly of 30 elected members. The current mayor is Yoshihide Yada, an independent backed Liberal Democratic Party and Komeito.

=== Elections ===
- 2007 Chuo mayoral election

== Transportation ==
=== Rail ===
At Tokyo Station, six Shinkansen, seven ordinary railway, and one subway line serve Chūō. In addition, three Toei subway lines stop at various stations throughout the ward.

=== Highway ===
Shuto Expressway

- No. 1 Ueno Route (Edobashi JCT – Iriya)
- No. 6 Mukojima Route (Edobashi JCT – Horikiri JCT)
- No. 9 Fukagawa Route (Hakozaki JCT – Tatsumi JCT)
- C1 Inner Loop (Edobashi–Takaracho–Kyōbashi–Ginza–Shiodome–Hamazakibashi–Shiba Park–Tanimachi–Kasumigaseki–Daikanmachi–Edobashi)

== Education ==
=== Colleges and universities ===
- Shizenkan University
- St. Luke's International University
- Waseda University Nihonbashi Campus

=== Primary and secondary education ===
Public elementary and junior high schools in Chūō are operated by the Chūō City Board of Education (中央区教育委員会). Public high schools are operated by the Tokyo Metropolitan Government Board of Education.

There is one prefectural high school in Chuo Ward, Harumi Sogo High School.

Public junior high schools include:

- Ginza Junior High School (銀座中学校)
- Harumi Junior High School (晴海中学校)
- Nihonbashi Junior High School (日本橋中学校)
- Tsukuda Junior High School (佃中学校)

Public elementary schools include:

- Akashi Elementary School (明石小学校) - Akashicho
  - Its previous building opened in 1926. The Architectural Institute of Japan advocated for retaining the building, but the board of education chose to raze the building and build a new one.
- Arima Elementary School (有馬小学校) - Nihonbashi Kakigaracho
- Chuo Elementary School - Minato
  - Formed on April 1, 1993 (Heisei 5) by the merger of Kyoka Elementary School (京華小学校) and Teppozu Elementary School (鉄砲洲小学校).
- Hisamatsu Elementary School (久松小学校) - Nihonbashi Hisamatsucho
- Joto Elementary School (城東小学校) - Yaesu
- Kyōbashi Tsukiji Elementary School (京橋築地小学校) - Tsukiji
- Meisho Elementary School (明正小学校) - Shinkawa
- Nihonbashi Elementary School (日本橋小学校) - Nihonbashi Ningyocho
- Sakamoto Elementary School (阪本小学校) - Nihonbashi Kabutocho
- Taimei Elementary School - Ginza
- Tokiwa Elementary School (常盤小学校) - Nihonbashi Hongokucho
- Toyomi Elementary School (豊海小学校) - Toyomicho
- Tsukishima Daiichi (No. 1) Elementary School (島第一小学校)
- Tsukishima Daini (No. 2) Elementary School (島第二小学校) - Kachidoki
- Tsukishima Daisan (No. 3) Elementary School (島第三小学校) - Harumi
- Tsukudajima Elementary School (佃島小学校)

== See also ==
- Hakozakicho, Tokyo
