= History of sushi =

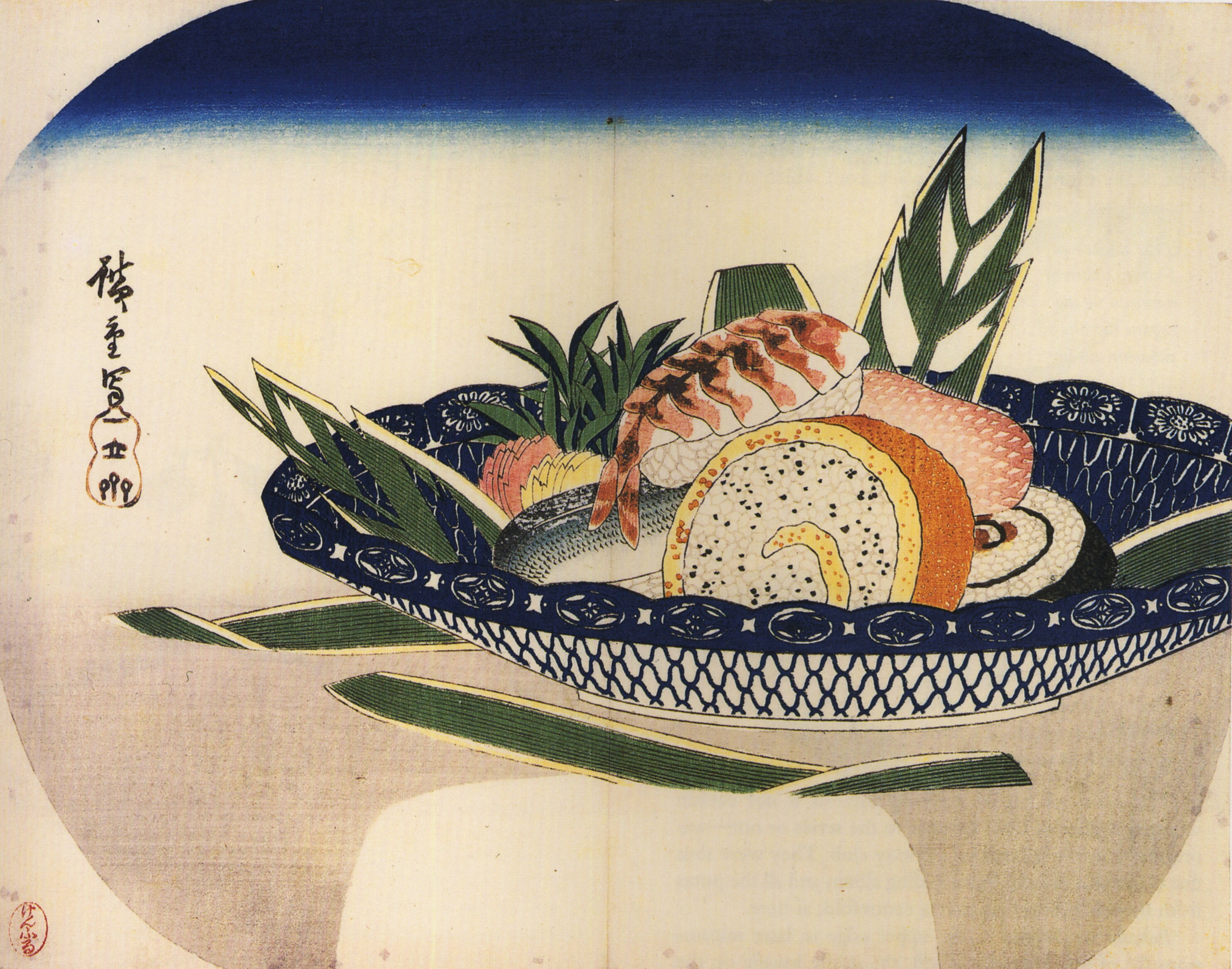
Bowl of Sushi by Hiroshige (1797–1858). Makizushi with rice rolled in tamagoyaki (front) and nigirizushi with shrimp (back).

The history of sushi (すし, 寿司, 鮨; pronounced [sɯɕiꜜ] or [sɯꜜɕi]) began with paddy fields, where fish was fermented with vinegar, salt and rice, after which the rice was discarded. The earliest form of the dish, today referred to as narezushi, was created in Southeast Asia from where it spread to surrounding countries. Narezushi spread to Japan around the Yayoi period (early Neolithic–early Iron Age). In the Muromachi period (1336–1573), people began to eat the rice as well as the fish. During the Edo period (1603–1867), vinegar rather than fermented rice began to be used. The dish has become a form of food strongly associated with Japanese culture.

The inventor of modern sushi is believed to be Hanaya Yohei, who invented nigiri-sushi during the Edo period in 1824, this is a type of sushi most known today, in which seafood is placed on hand-pressed vinegared rice. It was the fast food of the chōnin class in the Edo period.

== Early history ==
The earliest form of sushi, a dish today known as narezushi, originated in Southeast Asia as a method of preserving freshwater fish. It likely developed in the Mekong River basin—modern-day Laos, Cambodia, and Thailand—and the Irrawaddy River basin in present-day Myanmar.

Narezushi was first documented in ancient China around the 4th century, when the Han Chinese migrated south and adopted the dish from the Baiyue, the original non-Han inhabitants of southern China, who were culturally related to modern Southeast Asians.

The technique involved lacto-fermenting fish with salt and rice to prevent spoilage. In Japan, narezushi spread with the introduction of wet-field rice cultivation during the Yayoi period.

The word for narezushi appears in Chinese records from the 2nd century CE as the character sa (鮓), meaning pickled fish with salt and rice.

== History ==
=== Sushi in Japan ===
In the Yōrō Code (養老律令, Yōrō-ritsuryō) of 718, the characters for "鮨" and "鮓" are written as a tribute to the Japanese imperial court, and although there are various theories as to what exactly this food was, it is possible that it referred to narezushi.

Until the early 19th century, sushi slowly changed and the Japanese cuisine changed as well. The Japanese started eating three meals a day, rice was boiled instead of steamed, and of large importance was the development of rice vinegar.

During the Muromachi period (1336–1573), the Japanese invented a style of sushi called namanare or namanari (生成、なまなれ、なまなり), which means "partially fermented". The fermentation period of namanare was shorter than that of the earlier narezushi, and the rice used for fermentation was also eaten with the fish. In other words, with the invention of namanare, sushi changed from a preserved fish food to a food where fish and rice are eaten together. After the appearance of namanare, sake and sake lees were used to shorten fermentation, and vinegar was used in the Edo period.

During the Edo period (1603–1867), a third type of sushi, haya-zushi (早寿司、早ずし, "fast sushi"), was developed. Haya-zushi differed from earlier sushi in that instead of lactic fermentation of rice, vinegar, a fermented food, was mixed with rice to give it a sour taste so that it could be eaten at the same time as the fish. Previously, sushi had evolved with a focus on shortening the fermentation period, but with the invention of haya-zushi, which is simply mixed with vinegar, the fermentation process was eliminated and sushi became a fast food. Many types of sushi known in the world today, such as chirashizushi (散らし寿司, "scattered sushi"), inarizushi (稲荷寿司, "Inari sushi"), makizushi (巻寿司, "rolled sushi"), and nigirizushi (握り寿司, "hand-pressed sushi"), were invented during this period, and they are a type of haya-zushi. Each region utilizes local flavors to produce a variety of sushi that has been passed down for many generations. A 1689 cookbook describes haya-zushi, and a 1728 cookbook describes pouring vinegar over hako-zushi (箱ずし, "box sushi") (square sushi made by filling a wooden frame with rice).

Today's style of nigirizushi (握り寿司), consisting of an oblong mound of rice with a slice of fish draped over it, became popular in Edo (contemporary Tokyo) in the 1820s or 1830s. One common story of the origin of nigirizushi origins is of the chef Hanaya Yohei (1799–1858), who invented or perfected the technique in 1824 at his shop in Ryōgoku. The nigirizushi of this period was somewhat different from modern nigirizushi. The sushi rice of this period was about three times the size of today's nigirizushi. The amount of vinegar used was half that of today's sushi, and the type of vinegar developed during this period, called aka-su (赤酢, "red vinegar"), was made by fermenting sake lees. They also used slightly more salt than in modern times instead of sugar. Seafood served over rice was prepared in a variety of ways. This red vinegar was developed by Nakano Matazaemon (中野 又佐衛門), who is the founder of Mizkan, a company that still develops and sells vinegar and other seasonings today.

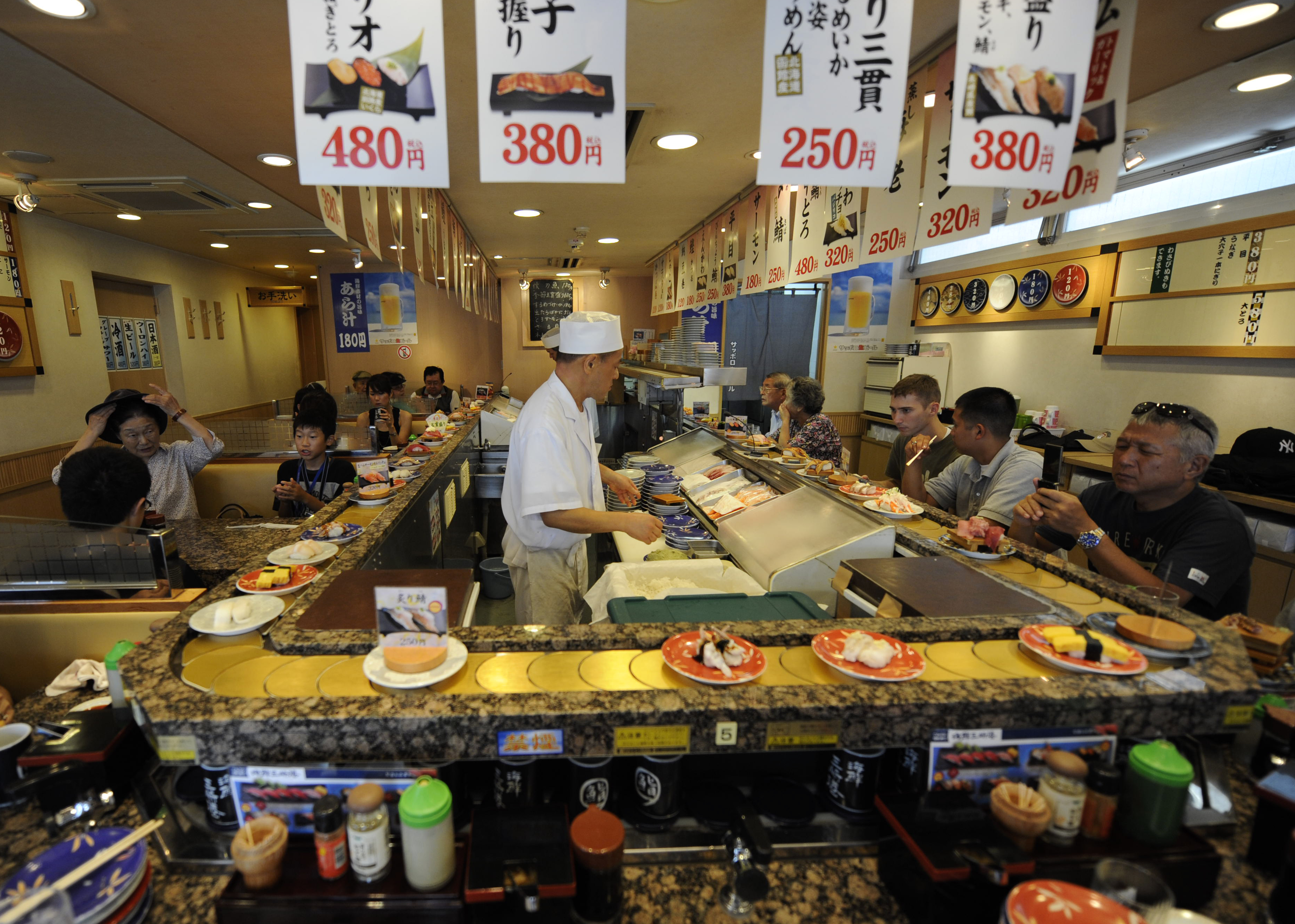
Conveyor belt sushi restaurant in Kamakura

In 1958, Yoshiaki Shiraishi opened the first conveyor belt sushi restaurant (回転寿司, kaiten-zushi) named "Genroku Zushi" in Higashi-Osaka. In conveyor belt sushi restaurants, conveyor belts installed along tables and counters in the restaurant transport plates of sushi to customers. Generally, the bill is based on the number of plates, with different colored plates representing the price of the sushi.

When Genroku Sushi opened a restaurant at the Japan World Exposition, Osaka, 1970, it won an award at the expo, and conveyor belt sushi restaurants became known throughout Japan. In 1973, an automatic tea dispenser was developed, which is now used in conveyor belt sushi restaurants today. When the patent for conveyor belt sushi restaurants expired, a chain of conveyor belt sushi restaurants was established, spreading conveyor belt sushi throughout Japan and further popularizing and lowering the price of sushi. By 2021, the conveyor belt sushi market had grown to 700 billion yen and spread outside Japan.

Raw salmon flesh may contain marine parasites, such as Anisakis nematodes, that cause anisakiasis. Before the availability of refrigeration, Japan did not consume raw salmon because of this health risk. Salmon and salmon roe have only recently come into use in making sashimi and sushi in the late 1980s. The introduction was from parasite-free Norwegian salmon belonging from Norwegian fishing companies who had an oversupply of farmed fish and were looking for a country to sell it off to. A deal resulted with Japanese company Nichirei for 5000 tons of salmon which started salmon sushi consumption in Japan.

==== Funazushi ====
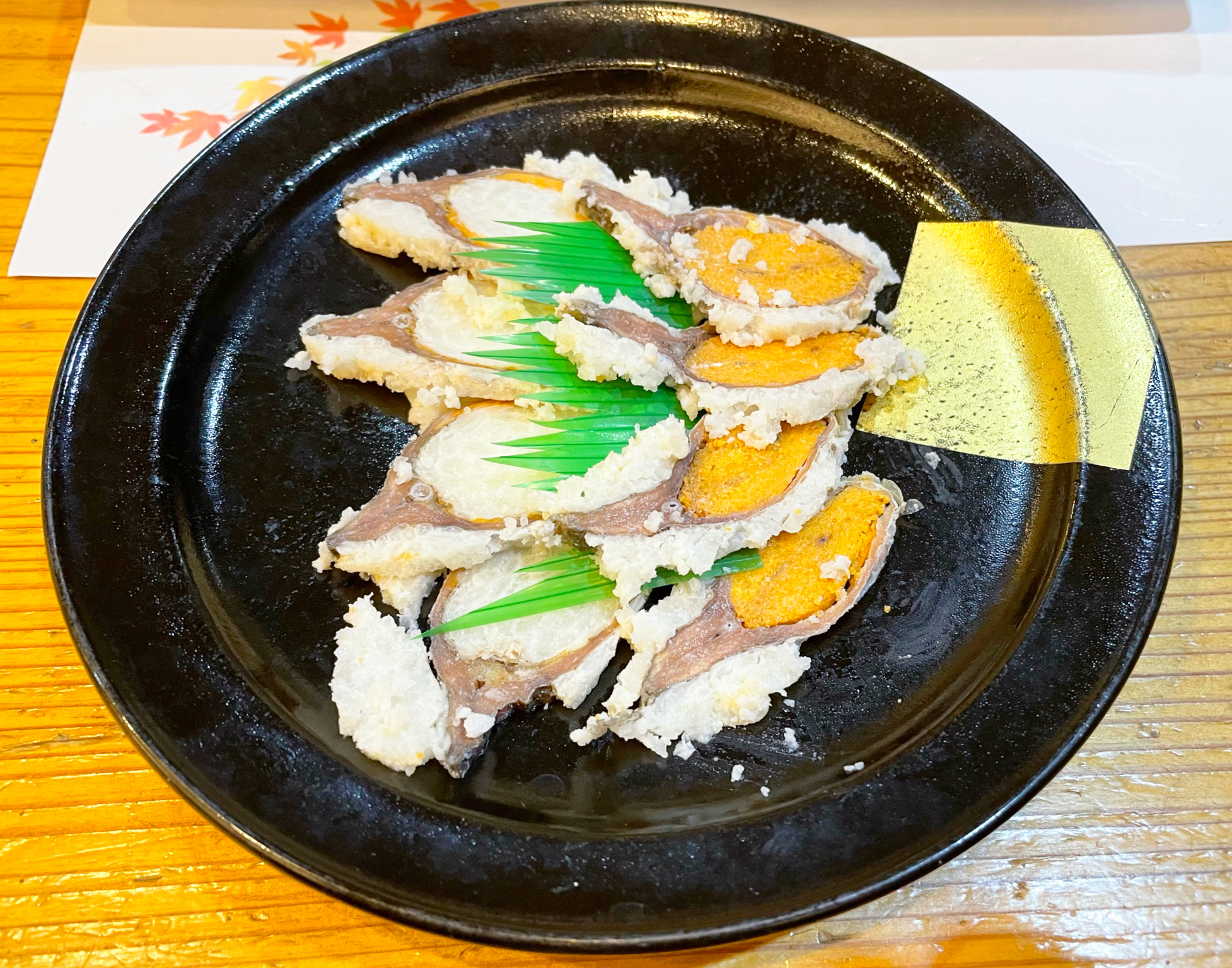
Funazushi

Funazushi is a rare type of narezushi prepared near Lake Biwa, Shiga Prefecture. Eighteen generations of the Kitamura family have been preparing the dish at Kitashina since 1619.

Fresh funa are scaled and gutted through their gills or throat keeping the body (and always the roe) of the fish intact. The fish are then packed with salt and aged for a year before being repacked annually in fermented rice for up to four years. The resulting fermented dish may be served sliced thin or used as an ingredient in other dishes.

Authentic funazushi is made from a wild subspecies of goldfish called nigorobuna (a wild type of Carassius auratus) endemic to the lake. It is technically misleading to say that "crucian carp" is used, as though any funa-type carp in the genus may be substituted, especially since the true crucian carp is a distinct species altogether (C. carassius) and is not indigenous to Lake Biwa.

==== Makizushi ====
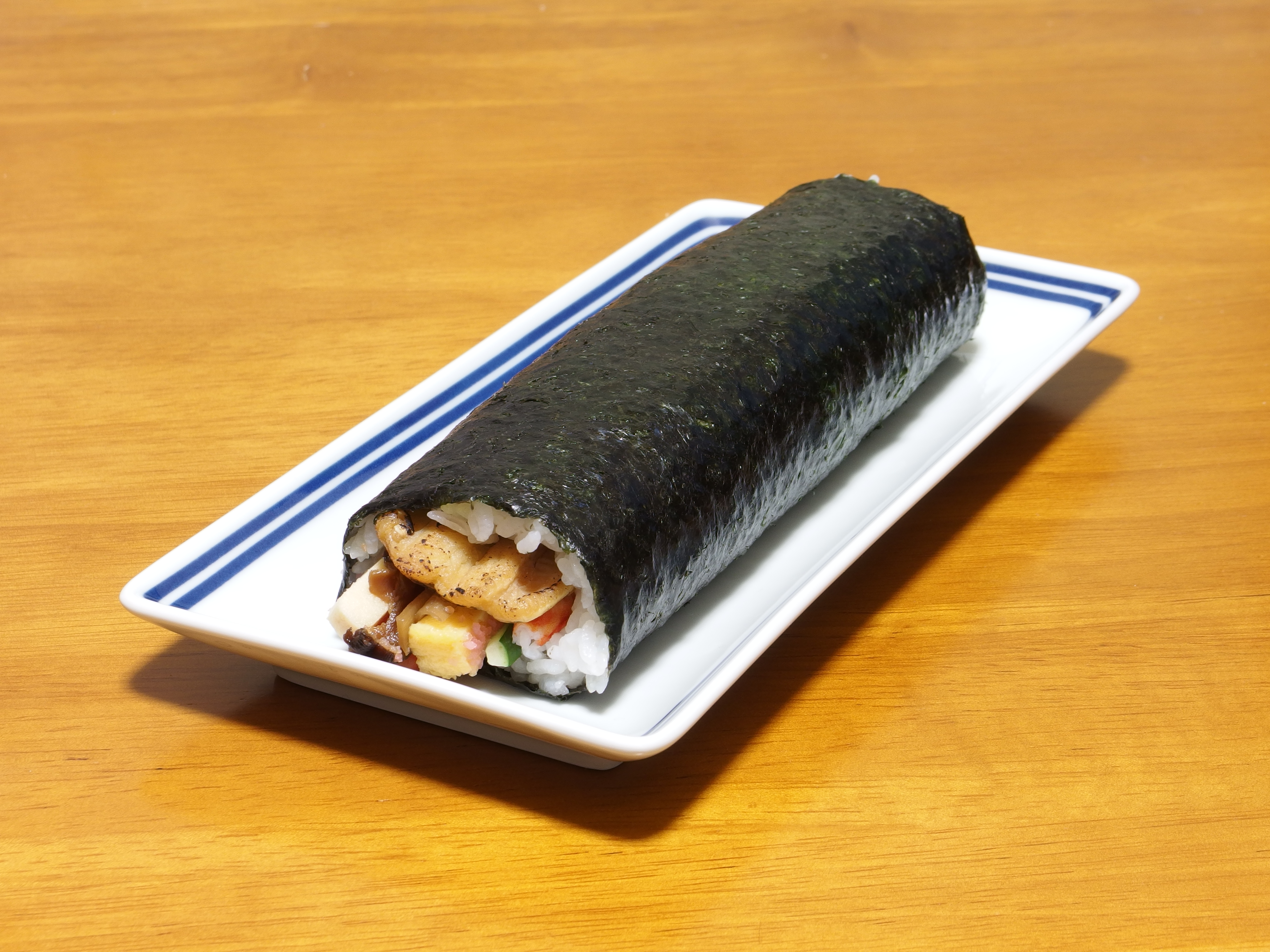
Futo-maki (太巻き) or Eho-maki (恵方巻き)

After the invention of the sheet form of nori seaweed around 1750, makizushi or norimaki, rice and various ingredients rolled with nori appeared. The term makizushi was first used in the book Ryōri Sankaikyō (料理山海郷), published in 1749. However, this dish did not resemble the current-day makizushi, but was instead seafood rolled with bamboo mat (makisu). Current-day makizushi first appeared in the book Shinsen Kondate buruishū (新撰献立部類集), published in 1776, which describes how makizushi is made: "Place a sheet of asakusa-nori, pufferfish or paper on the makisu and spread the cooked rice then arrange fishes on it. Roll the makisu tightly from one side". In 1778, a food shop guide book Shichijyūgonichi (七十五日; 1778) listed a shop whose most famous dish was "norimaki-zushi". A later book Meihan Burui (名飯部類; 1802) describes the process of making makizushi: "Spread asakusa-nori on the board, place the sushi rice on it. Ingredients are sea bream, abalone, shiitake, mitsuba and shiso. Roll them firmly".

== Sushi and Western culture ==
The Oxford English Dictionary notes the earliest written mention of sushi in an 1893 book, Japanese Interiors, where it mentions that "Domestics served us with tea and sushi or rice sandwiches". However, there is also mention of sushi in a Japanese-English dictionary from 1873, and an 1879 article on Japanese cookery in the journal Notes and Queries. Additionally, the 1879 best-selling book A Tour Around the World by General Grant by James Dabney McCabe describes former president Ulysses S. Grant dining on the "shashimi" [sic] version of sushi during his visit to Japan.

=== United States ===
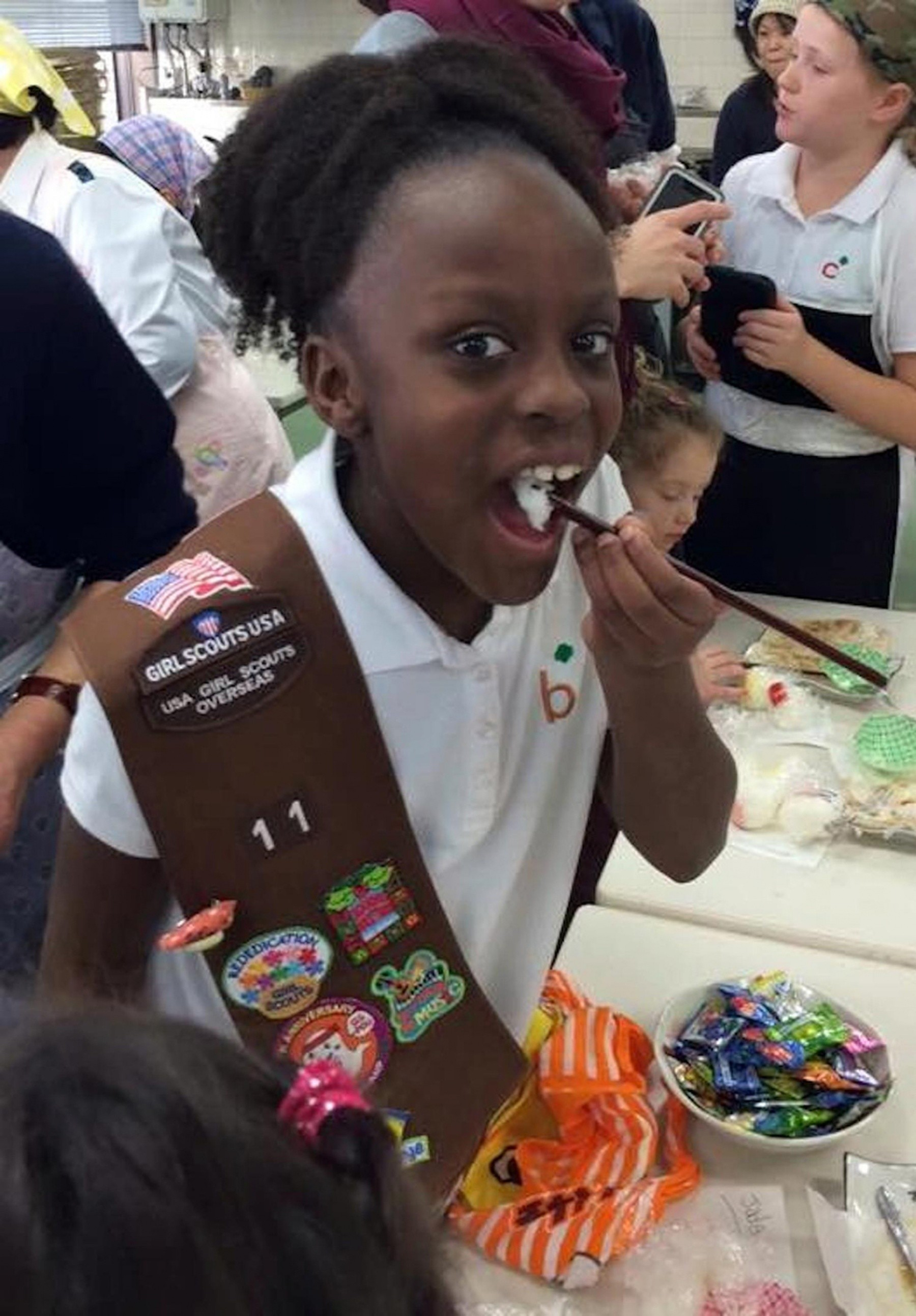
A Girl Scout eating sushi.

Sushi was already being served in the United States by the early 1900s, following an influx of Japanese immigration after the Meiji Restoration. The first sushi shop in the U.S. reportedly opened in 1906 in the Little Tokyo neighborhood of Los Angeles. H.D. Miller, food historian of Lipscomb University has written that a wave of Japanophilia in American high society resulted in the serving of sushi at social functions. Popularity of Japanese food peaked around 1905 when it was being served at Japanese-themed social gatherings across the United States, including in midwestern cities such as Minneapolis, Minnesota, St. Louis, Missouri and Bismarck, North Dakota. According to Miller, the earliest published mention of sushi eaten by an American, in America, was an 18 August 1904 article in the Los Angeles Herald about a luncheon served in Santa Monica by the socialite Fern Dell Higgins.

Several years later, a wave of anti-Japanese nativism sentiments and restrictions on Japanese immigration, starting with the Gentlemen's Agreement of 1907, caused a subsequent decline in the acceptance of Japanese cuisine. After the outbreak of World War II, Japanese-American restaurants on the West Coast were generally forced to close and sell off their businesses due to internment orders on their proprietors. One restaurant that reopened after the war to serve sushi was Matsuno Sushi (Matsu-no-sushi) in Little Tokyo, Los Angeles. This restaurant had been in business at least since 1938 or 1939, and by 1949, it was back serving sushi (featuring local bluefin tuna) for lunch. But the maki and inari they served was not shaped by hand by trained chefs, but molded in cookie-cutters.

The Kawafuku restaurant in Little Tokyo has been credited with being the "first true sushi bar" in the United States, that is to say, the first to serve sushi from a trained sushi chef in the country. Some sources accept the claim made by a man named Noritoshi Kanai that he was the person instrumental in persuading Kawafuku's owner to start the sushi section. Kanai has also claimed to be the person who coined the term "sushi bar". Kanai headed the Tokyo-based arm of Mutual Trading, an importer of Japanese food ingredients that served Kawafuku and other restaurants. The first sushi chef in America according to this account was Shigeo Saito, and some sources paint the chef as the principal figure who brought real sushi to the U.S.

Articles that gave positive views of tourism to Japan and Japanese cuisine began appearing in the media in the United States in the 1950s, paving the way to the public accepting different kinds of Japanese cuisine.

Though the true origin is disputed, many believe the California roll was invented in Los Angeles by substituting a slice of avocado for the seasonal toro (fatty tuna) in a traditional maki roll.

=== United Kingdom ===
A report of sushi being consumed in Britain occurred when the then Crown Prince Akihito (born 1933) visited Queen Elizabeth II at the time of her coronation in May 1953.

=== Canada ===
Although sushi was first served in Canada with the first arrivals of Japanese immigrants during the 19th century, it was not until changes to immigration rules in the 1960s that it started becoming widely available. Vancouver in particular went from 3 sushi outlets in 1976 to more than 600 in 2014, a larger number per capita than in Canada's largest city Toronto. Although the true origin is disputed, it's widely believed that Chef Hidekazu invented the California roll (originally called "Tojo-maki") in Vancouver, by inverting the roll and putting rice on the outside to make it more accessible to Western tastes, and adding non-traditional ingredients like avocado. The B.C. roll was also invented in Vancouver by Hidekazu in 1974 using barbecued salmon.

=== Australia ===
Australia is a major source of rice used in sushi, in particular Leeton, New South Wales, which is the headquarters of SunRice.

Sushi is believed to have been introduced into Australia between the early 1970s and the 1980s. The first known sushi conveyor belt in Australia appeared in Queensland in 1993, when Sushi Train opened its first restaurant.

A uniquely Australian style of sushi emerged in the late 1990s, when takeaway sushi stores opened in Melbourne and Sydney. These stores served uncut sushi rolls, now known as hand rolls, and used ingredients such as cooked chicken, canned tuna and beef. Distinctive rolls such as the salmon avocado and teriyaki chicken avocado can be found throughout Australia. This style of roll is now becoming known worldwide, with the opening of the first Australian-style sushi store in New York in 2023, and the first in the UK in 2024.

=== New Zealand ===
When David Bowie played in Auckland in 1983 as part of the Serious Moonlight Tour, it was rumoured his contract rider stated that sushi be on the menu, which at the time was rare and exotic in New Zealand, and typically served only in high-end city restaurants.

St Pierre's, a nationwide food franchise, officially began serving sushi in 1993, after originally being established as a seafood delicatessen in Wellington in 1984.

== See also ==
- Burong isda
- Pla ra
- Japanese cuisine
- Chinese cuisine
- Food history
