= Shinkawa, Chūō, Tokyo =

Shinkawa 新川
- Urban area
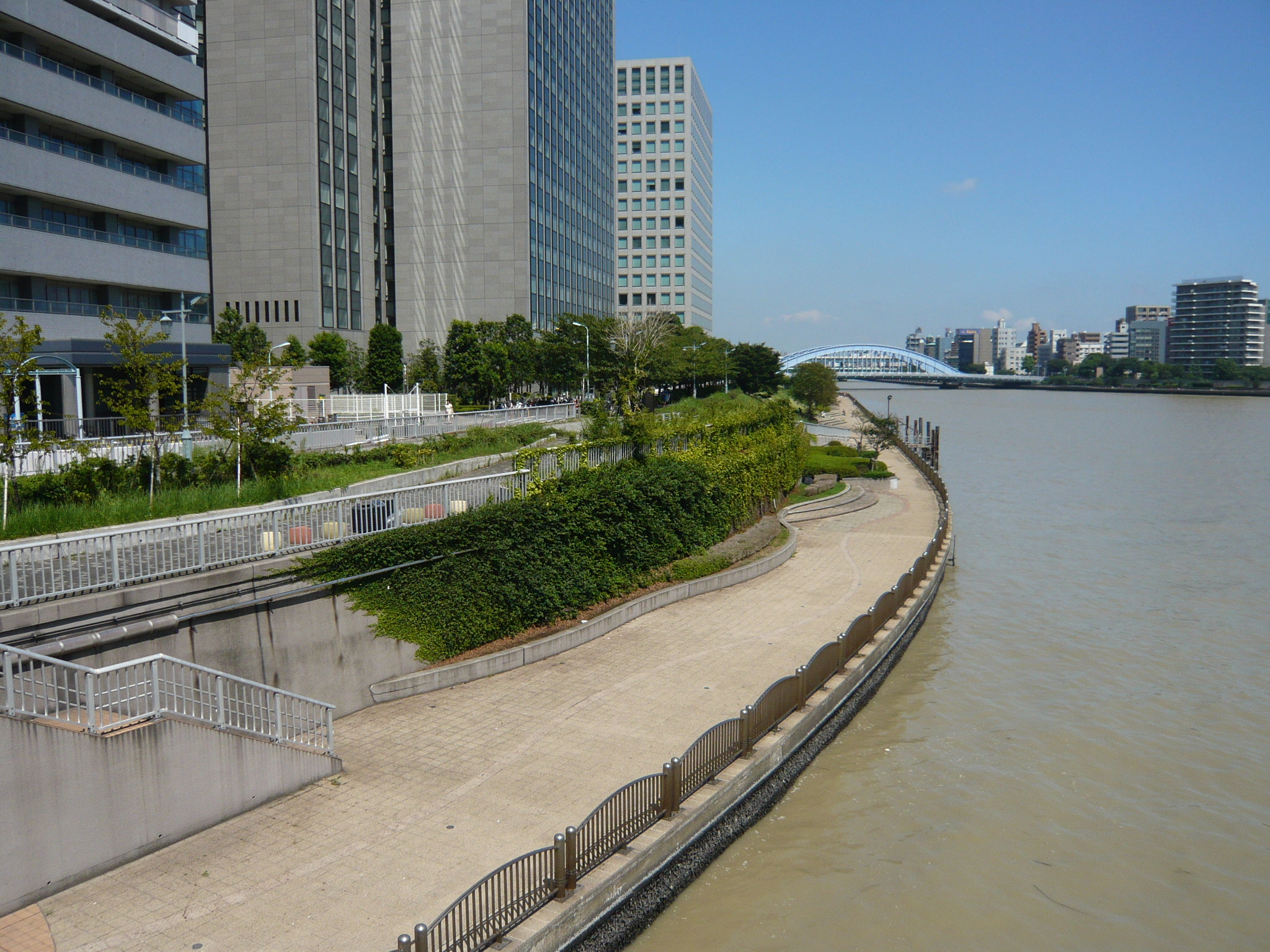
- The Sumida River Terrace at Shinkawa Park

- Location within Special wards of Tokyo Location within Japan
- Coordinates: 35°40′37.18″N 139°46′57.45″E
- Country: Japan
- City: Tokyo
- Ward: Chūō

Population (2019-09-01)
  - Total: 9,116
- Time zone: UTC+09:00 (JST)
- Postal Code: 104-0033.

Shinkawa (新川) is an area in Chūō, Tokyo located in the Kyōbashi area that was formerly Kyōbashi Ward. The current administrative names are Shinkawa 1-chome and Shinkawa 2-chome. The area is surrounded by the Sumida River, Nihonbashi River, and Kamejima River. The area was historically called Reiganjima.

== Overview ==
This area was originally an island in the Sumida River facing the mouth of the Hatchobori River, a branch of the Hirakawa River (formerly the Kanda River), and was called Edo Nakajima. Tokugawa Ieyasu reclaimed the island during Edo construction. Reiganjima was excavated from the Kamejima River side south of Reigan Bridge to the south of Eitai Bridge, and this later came to be known as "Shinkawa". The northern side of the Shinbori moat was called Hakozakijima (now Nihonbashi Hakozakicho), and the southern side was called Reiganjima. Further south, there was a small U-shaped moat surrounding the Fukui Domain residence, which was called "Echizenbori". The name Reiganjima comes from Reiganji Temple, which was once located in the northeast of Hatchobori, but the temple was moved to Fukagawa after the Great Fire of Meireki, and town houses were built on the site.

The Shinbori canal, which connects to Hatchobori, was a key maritime route in Japan during the Edo period, and continues to the Dosanbori canal and Iidabori canal further west. The Echizen canal was lined with boat crew houses, and the southern end of Reiganjima was home to a boat watch station. Many shipwrights lived in this area, which connects to Kiba, and many sake wholesalers gathered on the riverside.

In the Meiji era, water transportation in Tokyo City increased rapidly, and in order to accommodate this, the Iida-bori was reconnected with the Kanda-gawa River, and the Hatcho-bori and Shin-bori were renamed the Nihonbashi-gawa River. The former residence of the Fukui clan was sold to Meiji government notables and businessmen such as Nabeshima Naohiro, Fukushima Takanori (a samurai of the Tsuruga clan), Kawai Shogin, and Hashimoto Zenshiro. In addition, Nippon Yusen, a company run by the Mitsubishi Zaibatsu, was established on the south side of Sannohashi, and Tōkai Kisen, a company run by Shibusawa Eiichi, was established further south. The Reiganjima steamship terminal was established, and sea routes to the Bōsō Peninsula, the Izu Peninsula, Oshima, Hachijō-jima, and other areas flourished.

After the Great Kanto Earthquake of 1923, the site of the mansion was developed as a small park for the earthquake reconstruction, called Echizenbori Park (now called Echizenbori Children's Park), and the name Echizenbori was preserved. In 1948, Shinkawa was filled in as part of the war damage cleanup, and only the place name remained. A guide board by Tokyo's Chuo Ward has been installed at the former mouth of the river on the Sumida River side.

It is now a relatively quiet area with a mixture of office buildings and residential areas such as apartment buildings. Currently, the former Nippon Yusen building is a rental apartment building after Mitsubishi Warehouse, and the former Tokyo headquarters twin buildings of Sumitomo Warehouse stand on the former Tokyo Bay Kisen building. The embankment of the Sumida River has also been developed as Shinkawa Park by Chuo Ward.

Although it belongs to the Kyobashi area, it has had close ties with Nihonbashi Hakozakicho and the Fukagawa area across the Sumida River throughout history. Most of Shinkawa is a parishioner area of Tomioka Hachiman Shrine, and it participates in the Fukagawa Festival, one of the three major festivals of Edo. Only a part of the Minami-Takahashi neighborhood is in the parishioner district of Teppozu Inari Shrine, and in places where the parishioner district is set up in a way that divides the neighborhood association, people participate in both annual festivals.

The postal code is 104-0033.

== Gallery ==
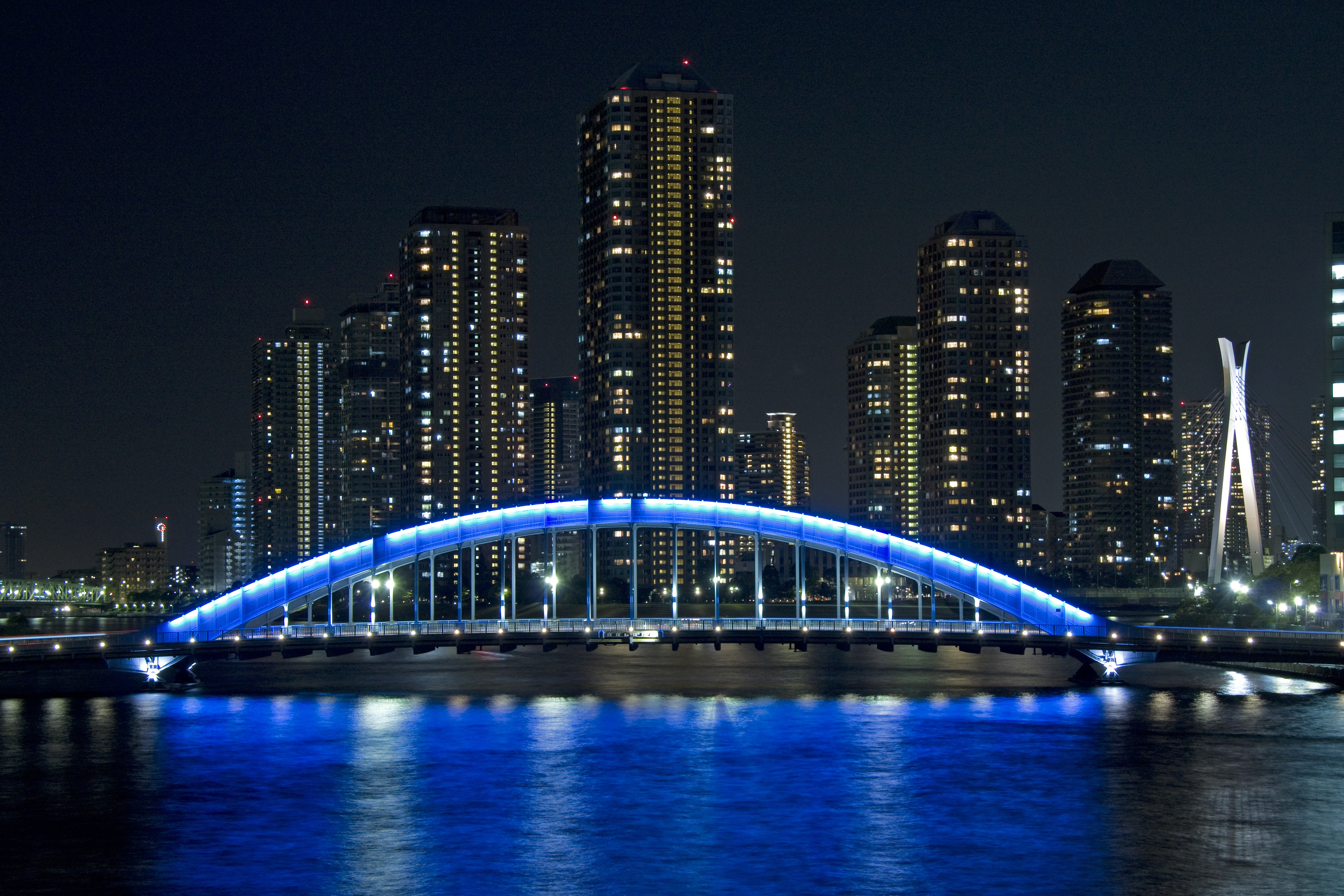
Illuminated Eitai Bridge（November, 2008）

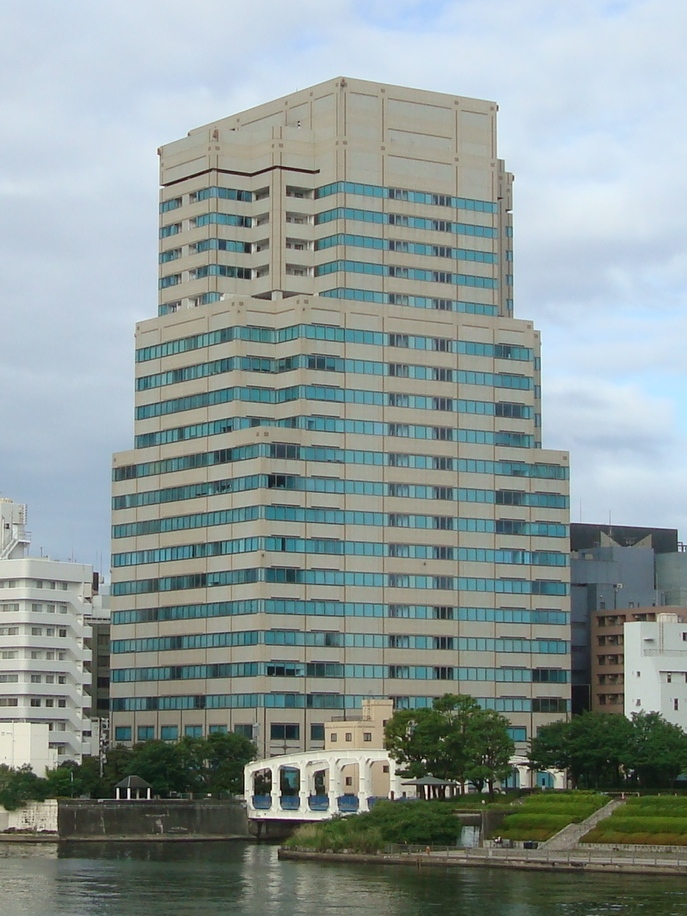
Kayabacho Tower, formerly the headquarters of Yamaichi Securities
