= Ningyocho =

District in Chuo, Tokyo

Ningyōchō 人形町
- District
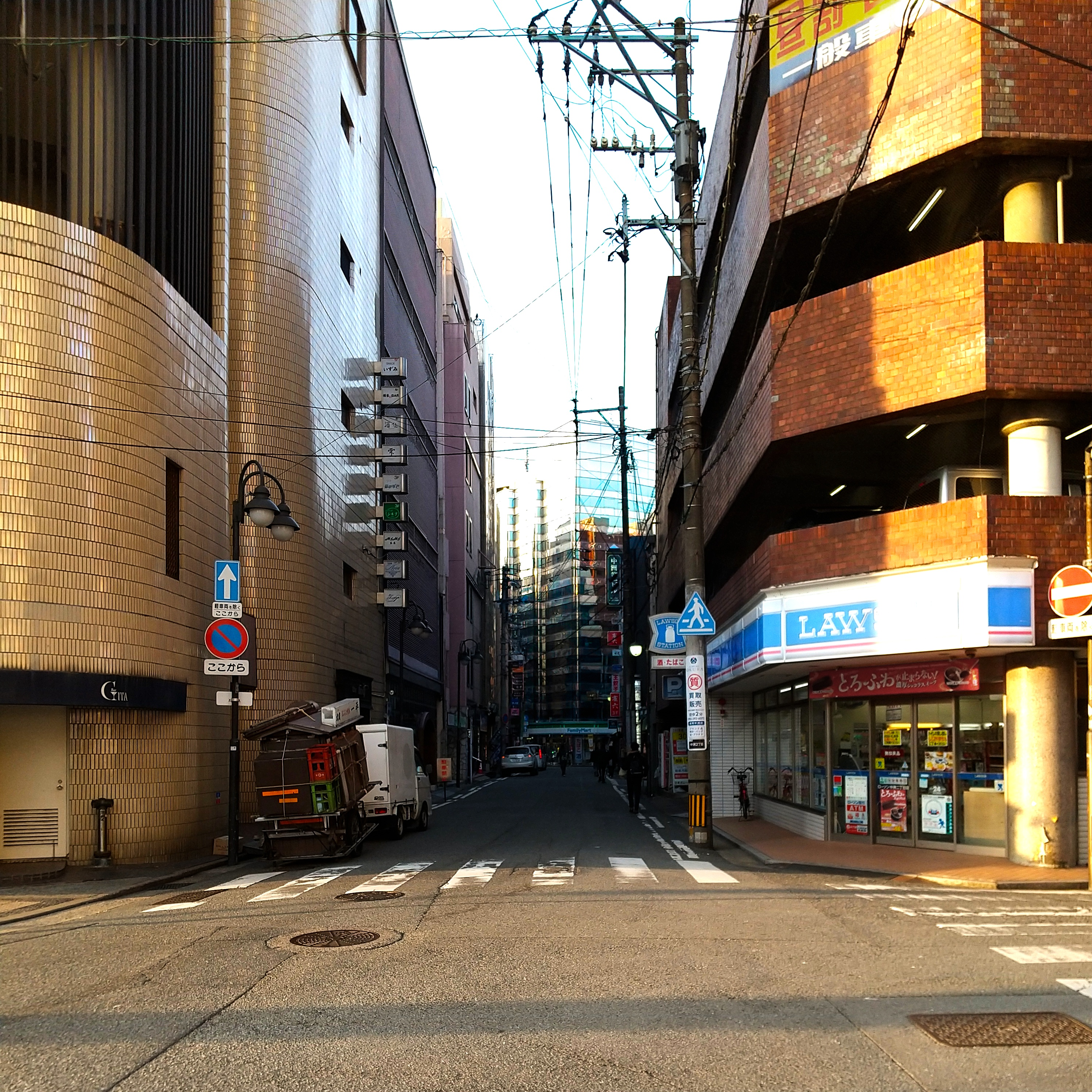
- Looking north from Shinbashi Dōri
- Interactive map of Ningyōchō
- Coordinates: 35.684776°N 139.782371°E
- Country: Japan
- Prefecture: Tokyo
- Special ward: Chūō

Population (August 2026)
  - Total: 5,700
- Time zone: UTC+9 (Japan Standard Time)
- Postal code: 103-0027

Ningyōchō (Japanese: 人形町), or more formally Nihonbashi Ningyōchō (Japanese: 日本橋人形町) is a district located in the centre of Nihonbashi, Chuo Ward, Tokyo, Japan.

== History ==
In 1590, when Tokugawa Ieyasu arrived in Edo, the area that would become Chuo Ward, and Nihonbashi, was largely undeveloped marshlands. Through reclaiming efforts, the area was developed into a downtown east of Edo Castle.

Urban development progressed in the downtown, and the rapid population growth of Edo increased the demand for laborers and craftsmen. Ieyasu enacted a system of tax exemptions for land rent in the area, to encourage the opening of shops and trade. This resulted in an influx of merchants from other regions of Japan, and a commercial district developed around Nihonbashi.

The region developed more as an entertainment district in the mid-1600s, with the growth of the Saruwaka Theatre (猿若座) and the Murayama Theatre (村山座), two of the 'three great kabuki theatres of Edo'. These were built around present day Ningyōchō 3-chōme, and nearby Horidome-chō.

Puppet (in Japanese, ningyō or 人形) shows became a common scene in Ningyōchō, with shows being cheap and popular entertainment for ordinary people. Puppeteers, along with puppet-makers, repairers, and traders came to live in the area (around modern-day Ningyōchō 2-chōme). The town officially took the name Ningyōchō in 1933 during redevelopment efforts after the 1923 Great Kanto Earthquake.

== Geography ==
Ningyōchō is bordered by seven other districts of Nihonbashi: (clockwise, from the north) Tomizawachō, Hisamatsuchō, Hamachō, Nakasu, Hakozakichō, Kakigarachō, and Koamichō.

The local train station Ningyocho Station serves both the Tokyo Metro and the Toei Subway, on the Hibiya Line and the Toei Asakusa Line respectively.

== See also ==
- Oyakodon - A Tokyo specialty dish originating in Ningyōchō.
