= T. Hasegawa =

Japanese flavours and fragrances company

T. Hasegawa Co., Ltd.
- Native name: 長谷川香料株式会社
- Type: Public (K.K)
- Traded as: TYO: 4958
- ISIN: JP3768500005
- Industry: Chemicals
- Founded: May 9, 1903; 123 years ago as Hasegawa Totaro Shoten
- Founder: Totaro Hasegawa
- Headquarters: Chuo-ku, Tokyo 103-8431, Japan
- Area served: Worldwide
- Key people: Tokujiro Hasegawa (Chairman and CEO); Takao Umino (President and COO)
- Products: Flavors; Fragrances; Aromatic chemicals; Food additives
- Revenue: ▲JPY 49.7 billion (FY 2018) (US$ 450 million)
- Net income: ▲JPY 4.1 billion (FY 2018) (US$ 37 million)
- Number of employees: 1,590 (consolidated, as of September 30, 2018)
- Website: Official website

T. Hasegawa Co., Ltd. (長谷川香料株式会社, Hasegawa Kōryō Kabushiki-gaisha) is a major producer of flavors and fragrances headquartered in Japan. As of 2021, it is one of world's top ten flavor and fragrances companies.

== History ==
T. Hasegawa was established in 1903 as Hasegawa Totaro Shoten in Tokyo, Japan, by Totaro Hasegawa. In 1941, Shozo Hasegawa succeeded his father at the company. In 1961, T. Hasegawa Co., Ltd. was founded with Shozo Hasegawa as president and took over all business of Hasegawa Totaro Shoten. The new company established headquarters in the prestigious Nihon-bashi district of Tokyo.

The strong demand for Hasegawa products resulted in establishing Hasegawa's first overseas production facilities in Lawndale, California, in 1978 and the formation of T. Hasegawa USA. In 1989, this production facility moved to the city of Cerritos, California, where it is located to this day. On December 18, 1998, Tokujiro Hasegawa, a grandson of Totaro Hasegawa, was appointed President. Shozo Hasegawa was designated as Chairman of the Board, and Mr. Ryoshiro Hayashi as vice chairman.

In March 2000, T. Hasegawa was listed on the Tokyo 2nd stock market, and by March 2001 T. Hasegawa was moved to the Tokyo 1st stock market.
