= Hongokucho =

District in Chūō, Tokyo, Japan

Hongokuchō 本石町
- Neighborhood in Chūō
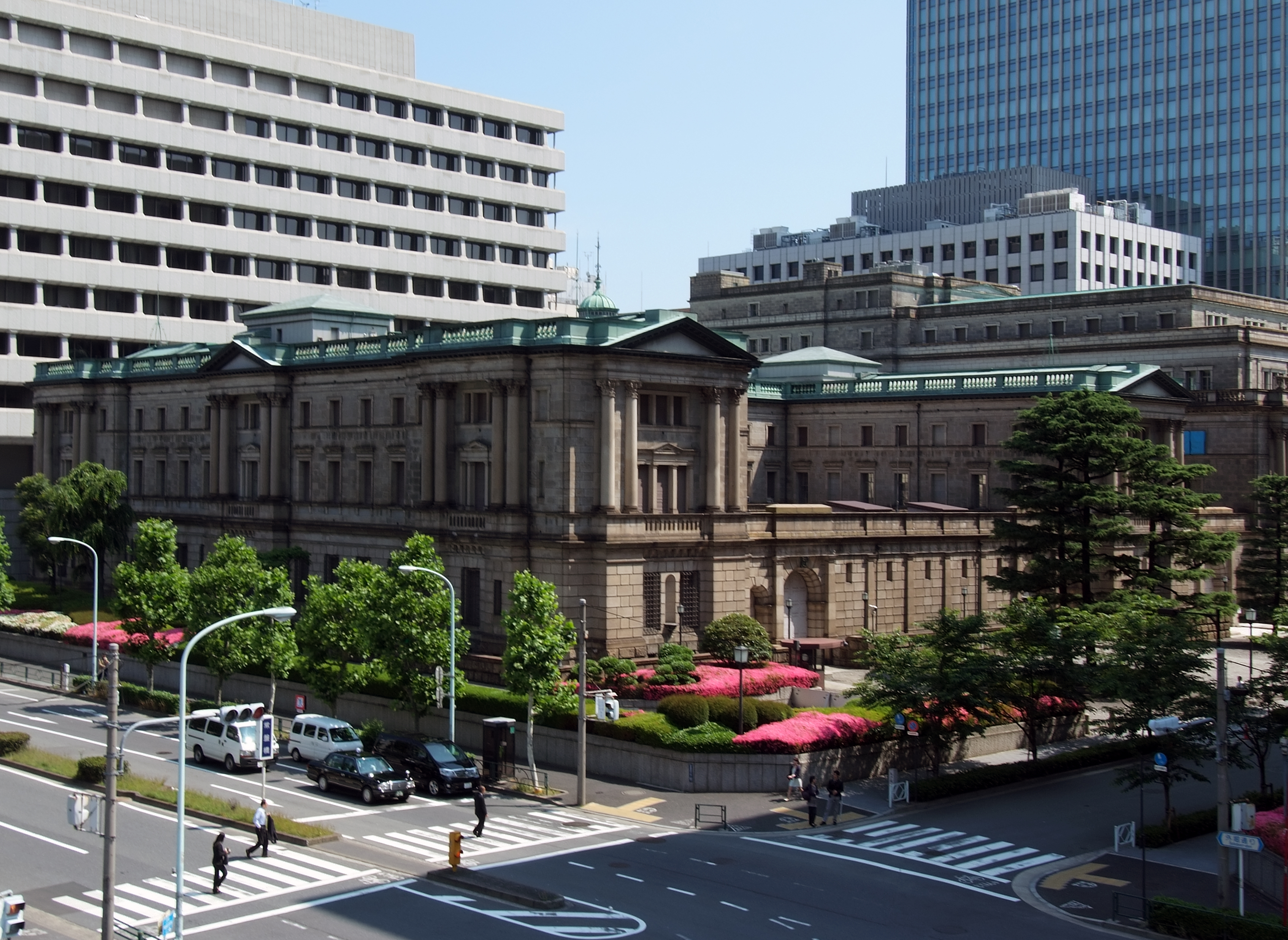
- Bank of Japan
- Interactive map of Hongokuchō
- Country: Japan
- Prefecture: Tokyo
- Special ward: Chūō

Population (1 October 2020)
  - Total: 97
- Time zone: UTC+09:00
- ZIP code: 103-0021
- Telephone area code: 03

Hongokuchō (Japanese: 本石町) or more formally Nihonbashi Hongokuchō (Japanese: 日本橋本石町) is a neighborhood of Nihonbashi, Chuo-ku, Tokyo. It is the location of the Bank of Japan.

== Education ==
Public elementary and junior high schools are operated by Chuo City Board of Education.

Hongokucho is zoned to Tokiwa Elementary School (中央区立常盤小学校) and Nihonbashi Junior High School (日本橋中学校).
