= Hanaya Yohei =

Japanese chef

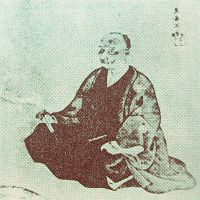
Portrait of Hanaya Yohei

Hanaya Yohei (華屋 与兵衛 or 花屋 與兵衛; 1799–1858) was a Japanese restaurateur and chef who is generally credited as the inventor of Tokyo-style (Edomaezushi; 江戸前寿司) nigiri sushi at the end of the Edo period. He is also regarded as the inventor of modern sushi that is widely recognized around the world.

== Life ==
Hanaya was born in Reiganjima, Edo (present-day Shinkawa, Tokyo). In 1810, he established a sushi restaurant, Hanaya, in Honjo, Edo (present-day Honjo, Tokyo).

Hanaya developed a new type of sushi, nigirizushi, which was different from the already existing oshizushi, in the early Bunsei era (1818-1830).

Sushi at his time was made from freshly captured fish from the nearby Tokyo Bay. This ruled out many of today's popular materials such as salmon roe (イクラ, ikura). Even though Tokyo is a coastal city, food safety was still a concern before the invention of refrigeration. To prevent spoilage, Hanaya either slightly cooked or marinated the fish in soy sauce or vinegar. It was quite reasonable for people to dislike the fatty belly meat of tuna because it would decompose very quickly. Hanaya marinated the lean red meat in soy sauce. Then he served the sliced fish on vinegared rice balls that are large by today's standard. His sushi was totally different from today's "raw fish" stereotype.

Hanaya died at the age of 59 in 1858.

Hanaya's cookery was a departure from Japanese eating habits of the time. In the early years, a chef only made sushi part-time. Then, slowly, inexpensive sushi stands (屋台, yatai) emerged. After the government outlawed these questionable food stands, sushi restaurants (料亭, ryōtei) became mainstream.

== See also ==
- History of sushi
