= Teppozu Inari Shrine =

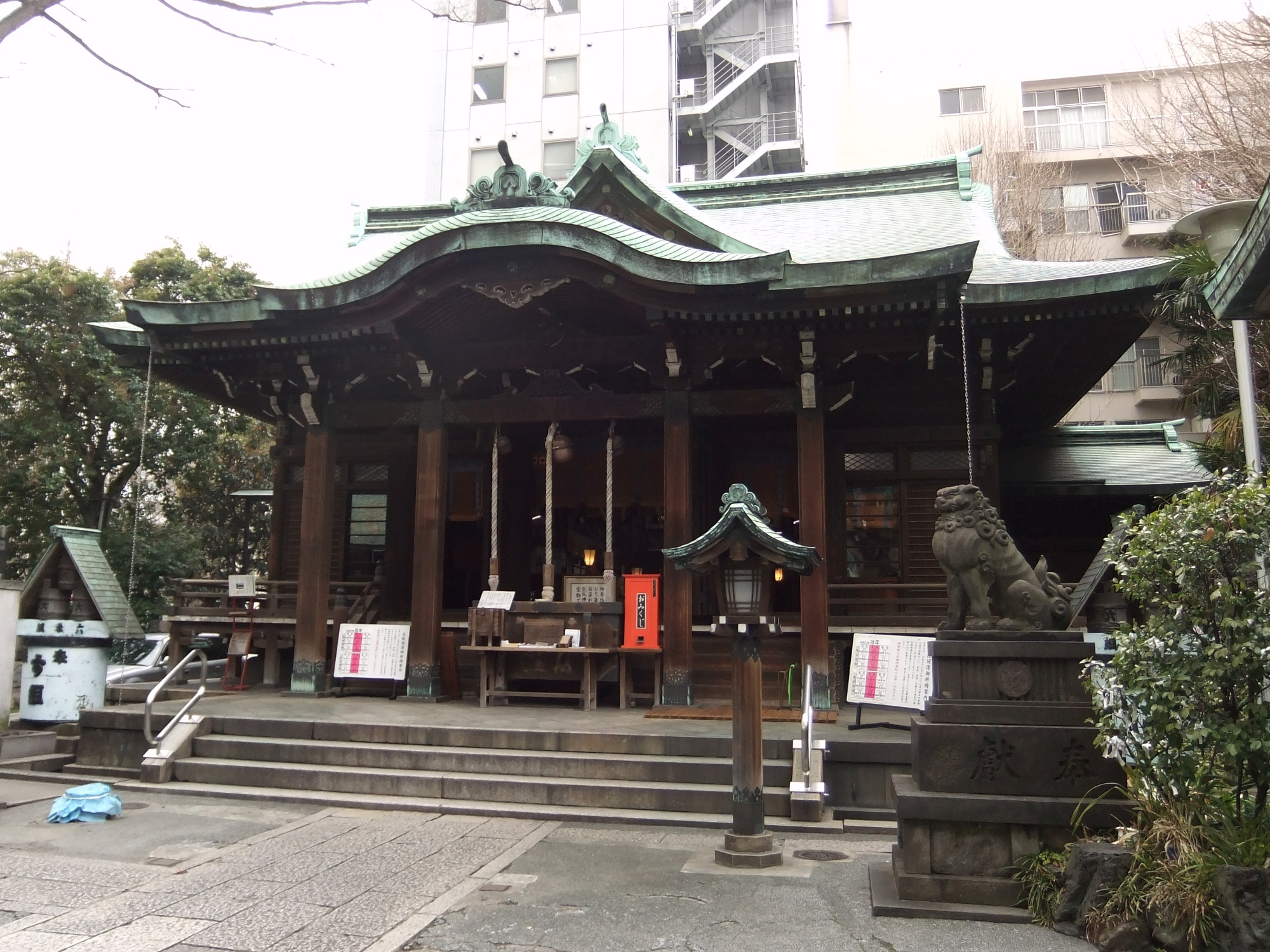
- The shrine in 2011

Location
- Country: Japan
- Interactive map of Teppozu Inari Shrine

Teppozu Inari Shrine is an Inari shrine in Chūō, Tokyo, Japan.
