= Irifune =

Irifune (written: 入船) is a Japanese surname. Notable people with the surname include:

- Kazuma Irifune (入船 和真, born 1986), Japanese footballer
- Satoshi Irifune (入船 敏, born 1975), Japanese long-distance runner
