= Nihonbashi Bakurochō =

Nihonbashi Bakurochō (日本橋馬喰町), known in short as Bakurochō (馬喰町), is a neighborhood in Chuo-ku, Tokyo.

It is at the intersection of the Kanda River and the Sumida River. Its name means "horse trader town", a reference to how it was formerly a center for selling and buying horses.

It is known as a center for the textile trade. Additionally, Matjaz Ursic and Heide Imai, in Creativity in Tokyo: Revitalizing a Mature City, stated that the concentration of hotels, stemming from lodging needed for horse trading, gave the Bakurochō area fame.

== Education ==
Public elementary and junior high schools are operated by Chuo City Board of Education (中央区教育委員会). Hisamatsu Elementary School (中央区立久松小学校) and Nihonbashi Junior High School (中央区立日本橋中学校) are the zoned public schools of Bakurochō. Bakurochō 1 and 2-chome can choose between Hisamatsu or Nihonbashi (中央区立日本橋小学校) elementary schools.
