= List of Japanese cooking utensils =

The following items are common Japanese cooking tools used in preparing Japanese cuisine. For a list of general cooking tools see the list of food preparation utensils.

== Knives ==
- Deba bōchō: kitchen carver for meat and fish
- Fugu hiki, Tako hiki, and yanagi ba: sashimi slicers
- Nakiri bōchō and usuba bōchō: vegetable knives for vegetables
- Oroshi hocho and hancho hocho: extremely long knives to fillet tuna
- Santoku: general purpose knife influenced by European styles
- Udon kiri and soba kiri: knife to make udon and soba
- Unagisaki hōchō: eel knife

== Pots, pans, and bowls ==
- Abura kiri: drainer tray for oils
- Agemono nabe: deep frying pot
- Donabe: ceramic pot for use on an open flame
- Hangiri: rice barrel
- Makiyakinabe: rectangular pan for tamagoyaki
- Mushiki and seiro: steamers
- Otoshi buta: drop lid
- Suihanki/rice cooker: electric appliance for cooking rice
- Suribachi and surikogi: grinding mortar and pestle
- Takoyaki pan: frying pan for takoyaki
- Tetsubin: cast iron kettle
- Tetsunabe: cast iron pot (common for sukiyaki)
- Usu and kine: large mortar and pestle for pounding rice

== Other kitchen tools ==
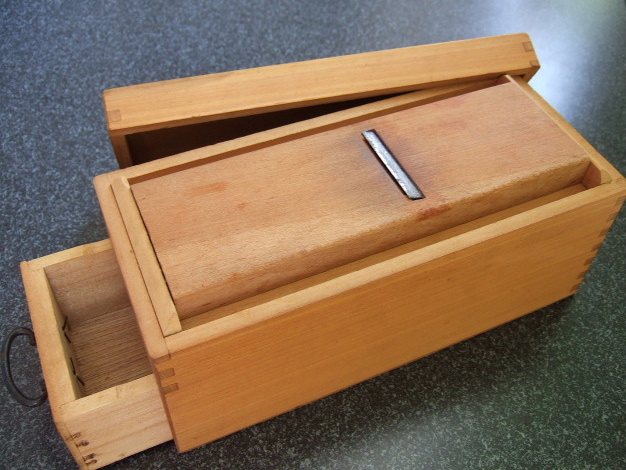
A katsuobushi kezuriki, with its blade cover removed and drawer slightly open

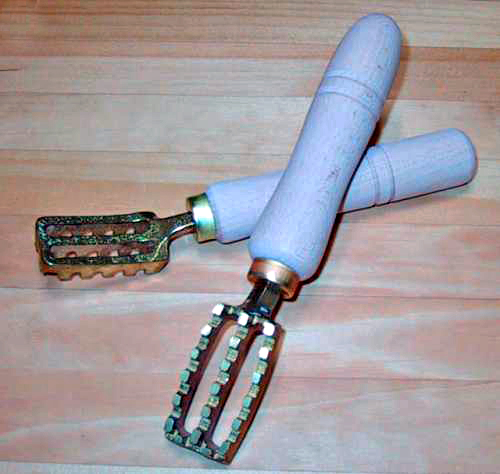
Two urokotori of slightly different sizes

- Ami jakushi: scoop with a net bottom
- Iki jime: awl or spike, used on fish's brain
- Katsuobushi kezuriki: mandoline-like device traditionally used to shave katsuobushi
- Kushi: skewers
- Makisu: bamboo mat for sushi rolls
- Oroshigane: graters
- Oshizushihako: boxes for pressed sushi
- Saibashi: Japanese kitchen chopsticks
- Shamoji: rice paddle
- Tsukemonoki and tsukemonoishi: Japanese-style pickle press
- Urokotori: fish scaler
- Zaru: bamboo draining basket

== Serving tools ==
- Jūbako: tiered boxes
- Shokado bento: bento box

== See also ==
- List of Japanese ingredients
- List of Japanese dishes
- List of Japanese condiments
- List of food preparation utensils
