= Makiyakinabe =

Rectangular Japanese cooking pan

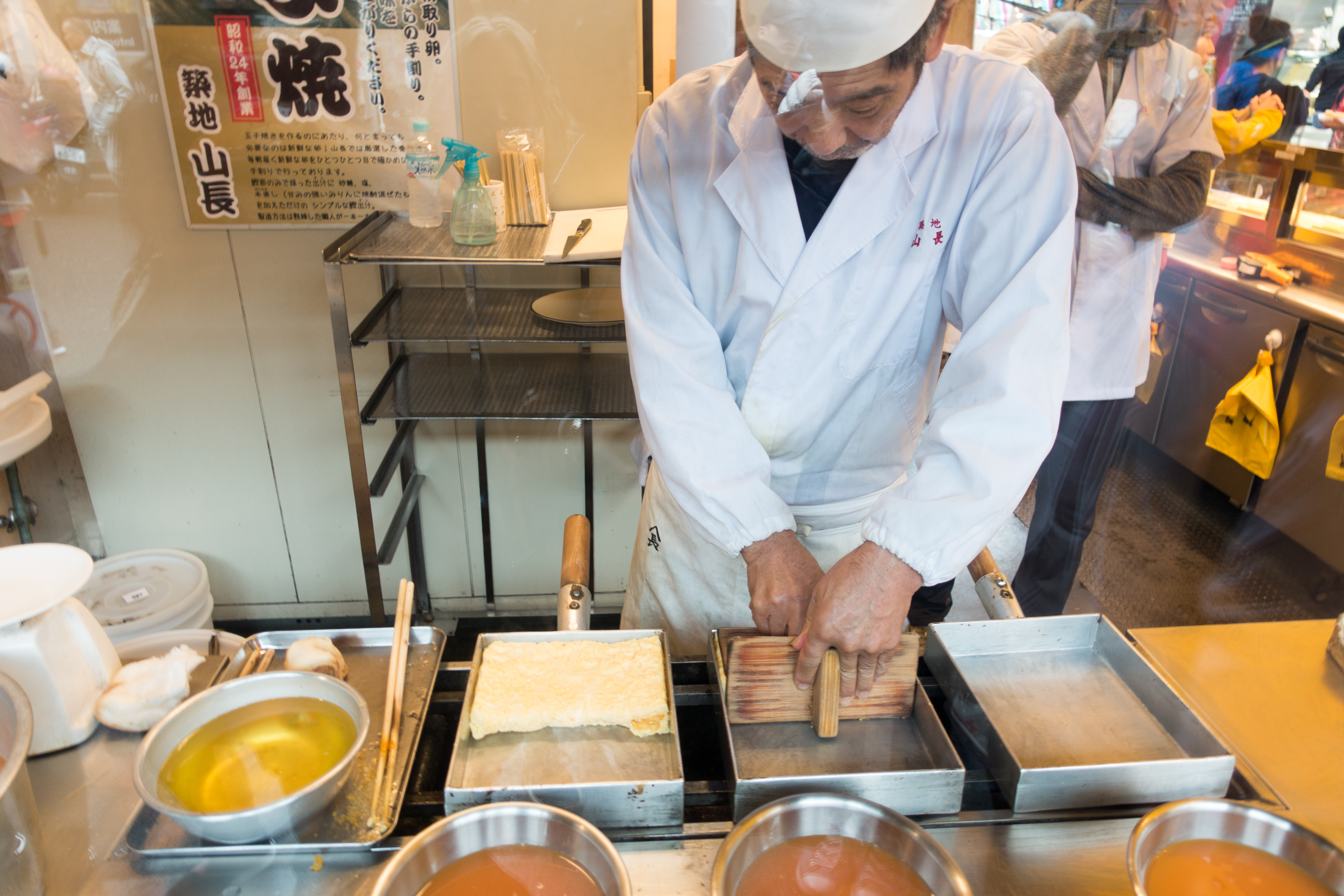
Makiyakinabe are used to make tamagoyaki, occasionally with the aid of a shaping board.

Makiyakinabe are square or rectangular cooking pans used to make Japanese-style rolled omelettes (tamagoyaki). The pans are commonly made from metals such as copper and tin, and can also be coated with a non-stick surface. Dimensions and proportions of the pan vary among regions of Japan, but it is always rectangular. Rolled omelettes made with makiyakinabe are commonly used as a side dish in sushi and bentō.

== Etymology ==
Several names are used to refer to the pan, such as makiyakinabe (巻き焼き鍋), tamagoyaki-ki (玉子焼き器), and tamagoyakinabe (玉子焼き鍋). Occasionally, the implement is simply referred to as a Japanese omelette pan. The term makiyakinabe derives from the Japanese words maki (巻き), meaning "roll", yaki (焼き), which is an umbrella term for "cooking over heat", and nabe (鍋), which means "pan". The terms tamagoyaki-ki and tamagoyakinabe both refer to the rolled omelettes that are typically made with the pan, with ki (器) meaning "implement" in the former phrase.

== Design and use ==
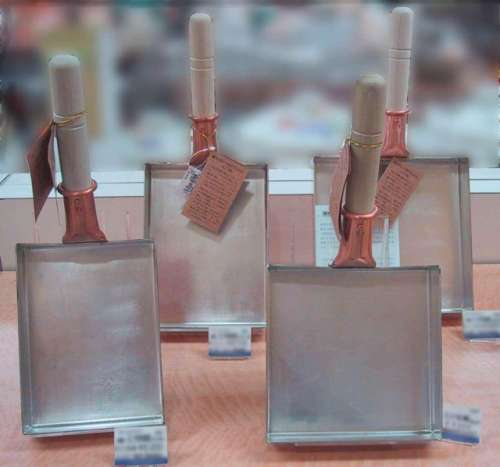
Different makiyakinabe for sale: left: Kansai-type, right: Kantō-type

The rectangular shape of the pan facilitates a constant diameter over the length of the omelette, giving the omelette its bar-like shape once rolled. Most professional pans are made of heavy copper coated or lined with tin, with these materials being preferred for their heat conduction. A cheaper, nonstick variety is a common alternative to the copper pan. There are three types of makiyakinabe: Kantō-type, Kansai-type, and Nagoya-type. Kantō-type pans are square, Kansai-type pans are tall-and-thin rectangles, and Nagoya-type pans are short-and-wide rectangles. In the Kantō region, makiyakinabe is typically used with a thick wooden lid that is used to help flip the omelette.

In Japanese cuisine, makiyakinabe pans are used for making sweet or savory tamagoyaki, sometimes called dashimaki tamago when dashi is used, (Note: When the dish is called dashimaki tamago, this often means it is savory or less sweet. Even though some literature intimates that the dish is automatically called dashimaki whenever dashi is used, in actuality, the dish is not precluded from being called tamagoyaki whether it uses dashi (or not).) or usuyaki tamago (thin, one-layer omelette).

A tamagoyaki dish starts as a single layer of rectangular omelette, (Note: The first layer might use just one third of the egg mixture, or just 10%.) but before it fully cooks and sets, it is folded over perhaps a third of a way onto itself by picking up a flap by the edge using Japanese kitchen chopsticks; the doubled layer is flipped onto the remaining sheet. More of the beaten egg mixture is added, and the flipping/ rolling process is repeated. The finished product is a rectangular block of layered omelette. (Note: Recipes may call for molding the cooked tamagoyaki by wrapping it within a makisu (sushi mat), but that detail is beyond the scope of the subject.)

The pan must be slicked with only a very thin coating of oil. To achieve this, the pan is wiped with a paper towel or piece of cloth daubed with oil. A piece of absorbent cotton ball (or cotton pad) is also sometimes utilised for this purpose.

Some recipes caution that the egg should not be allowed to brown at all, but this depends on the type of omelette, in other recipes the egg is allowed to turn golden-brown on its layers. Among the tamagoyaki stalls formerly at the Tsukiji Market, there are offerings with slight searing (焼き目, yaki-me) or browning on them.

== Tamagoyaki ==
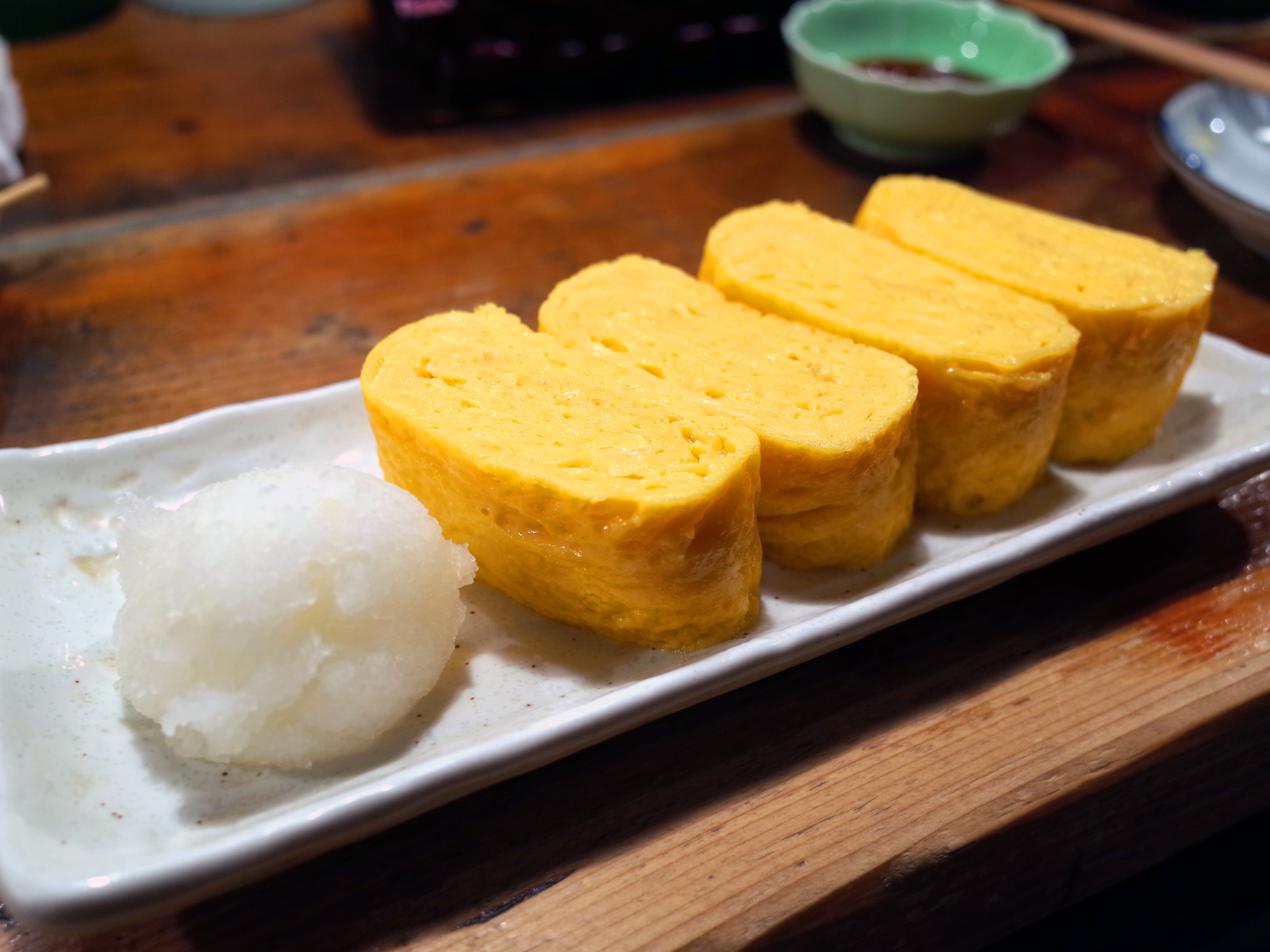
Makiyakinabe are commonly used to make tamagoyaki.

The rolled omelette made in makiyakinabe can be used as a topping for nigirizushi. Some sushi chefs make versions of the omelette using eggs mixed with shrimp paste and grated yamatoimo (a cultivar of the Chinese yam Dioscorea polystachya); this thick mixture is not cooked in layers but poured entirely up to the brim of the pan, cooked for perhaps 30 minutes, then flipped so the top and bottom are caramelized to a brown color and the omelette remains yellow and pliable within.

Varieties of the omelette depend on its thickness. Thinner varieties are used as garnishes or as wrappers which are formed into pouches that are filled with sushi rice. Thicker omelettes are more common and are used for nigirizushi and chirashizushi bowls. When shredded and used as a garnish, the omelette is called kinshi tamago, or golden thread egg.

Tamagoyaki can be eaten as a snack, side dish, or breakfast food. The omelettes are a common inclusion in bentō boxes.

== See also ==
- List of Japanese cooking utensils – utensils of similar Japanese origin
