= Oshizushihako =

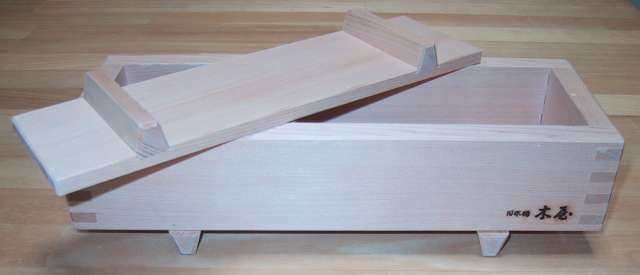
Wooden oshizushihako

An oshizushihako (Japanese: 押し寿司箱, literally: pressed sushi box) is a box or mold used to make oshizushi (pressed sushi). The box is traditionally made from wood, but nowadays often made from plastic.

It can be disassembled into three parts: a bottom part, the rectangular walls, and a top part. Before use, the wooden box should be put in water to reduce sticking of the rice. The bottom and top parts can be covered with a layer of plastic foil for easier cleaning. The bottom part and the walls are assembled before the rice and the topping is added. Next, the top part is used to press down on the sushi, hence the name "pressed sushi". For disassembly, the rectangular walls are pulled up while the top part still presses against the sushi. After removing the top part, the sushi is cut and can be served.

A variant of the oshizushihako has half cylindrical shapes cut from the thicker top and bottom parts so that the sushi is pressed in a cylindrical shape.

== See also ==
- List of Japanese cooking utensils
- Makisu
