= Rice cooker =

Kitchen appliance

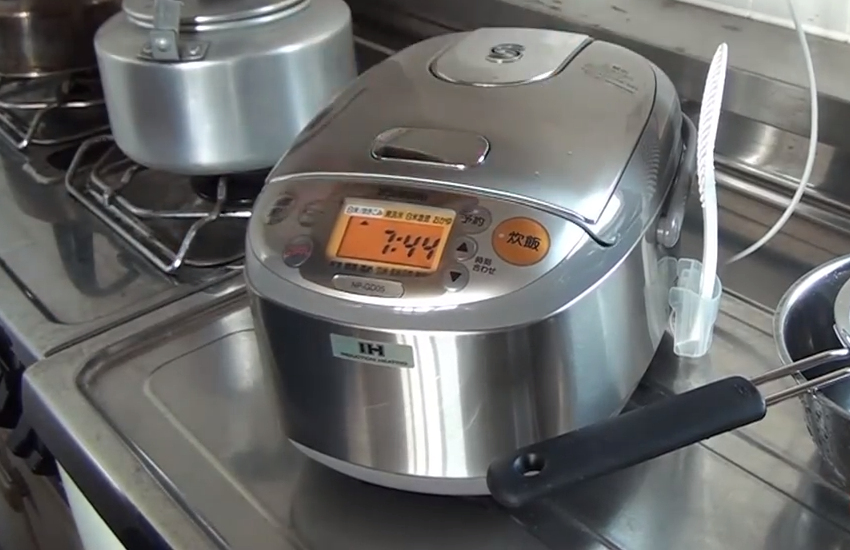
Electric induction rice cooker with scoop

A rice cooker or rice steamer is an automated kitchen appliance designed to boil or steam rice. It consists of a heat source, a cooking bowl, and a thermostat. The thermostat measures the temperature of the cooking bowl and controls the heat. Complex, high-tech rice cookers may have more sensors and other components, and may be multipurpose.

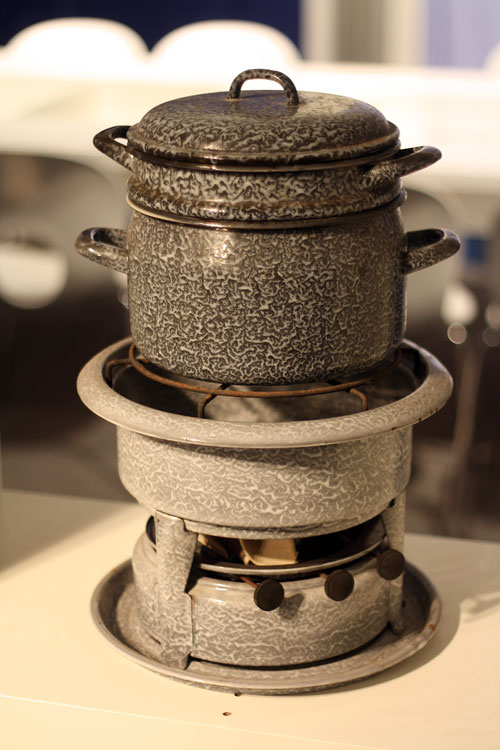
Traditional rice cooker commonly used by people of Indonesia in the Netherlands in 1950s. Showcase on display at the Eurasian festival Tong Tong Fair 2012.

The term rice cooker formerly applied to non-automated dedicated rice-cooking utensils, which have an ancient history (a ceramic rice steamer dated to 1250 BC is on display in the British Museum). It now applies mostly to automated cookers. Electric rice cookers were developed in Japan, where they are known as suihanki (Japanese: 炊飯器, literally, "boil-rice-device").

== History ==
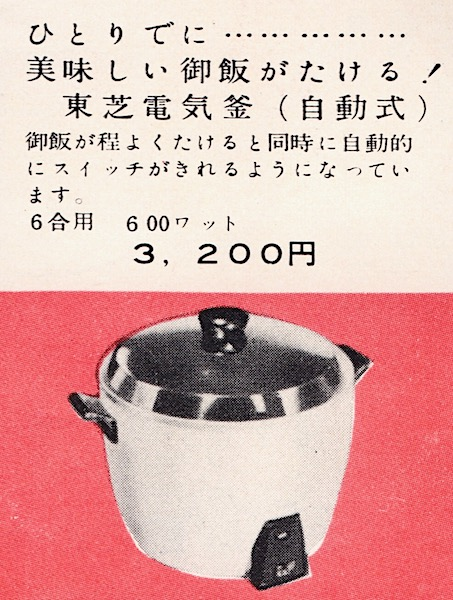
A 1956 advertisement for Toshiba's world's first automatic electric rice cooker, priced at 3,200 yen and capable of cooking 900 grams (2.0 lb) of rice

The NJ-N1, developed by Mitsubishi Electric in 1923, was the first electric rice cooker, a direct ancestor of today's automatic electric rice cookers. At that time, electricity was not widely used in ordinary households; it was for use on ships. It was a simple mechanism that heated with an attached heating coil without automation.

In the 1940s and early 1950s, Mitsubishi Electric, Matsushita Electric (now Panasonic), and Sony introduced electric rice cookers for home use with built-in heating coils, but they too were not automated and were not well received and sold poorly.

The ER-4, introduced by Toshiba on December 10, 1955 (or 1956), was the world's first automatic electric rice cooker for home use. It was developed by Toshiba's Shogo Yamada beginning in 1951 and completed in 1955 thanks to a breakthrough invention by Yoshitada Minami (ja), president of a Toshiba partner company. Research and development was a continuous process of trial and error, including experimentation carried out by Minami's wife Fumiko. Research showed that rice cooks best when cooked at a temperature of 98 °C (208 °F) for 20 minutes, so theoretically rice should cook well if an automatic timer is set to turn off the cooker 20 minutes after the water in the pot has boiled. However, the time it takes for the water to boil varies depending on the temperature, the amount of heat generated by the pot, and the amount of rice and water, so in the prototype stage, sometimes the rice was overcooked and burnt, while at other times it was undercooked and the rice was left with a core. The revolutionary idea to solve this problem was to use a double-layered structure for the pot. The mechanism involved filling the outer pot with a glass of water and heating it. After about 20 minutes, the water would evaporate and the temperature would rise rapidly, which the thermostat would detect and turn off.

The initial launch price was 3,200 yen, about one-third of the average college graduate's starting monthly salary. At its launch, 700 units were produced, but they did not sell well. The company then conducted sales promotions using the sales networks of electric power companies, held sales demonstrations, and sold an automatic timer that could turn on the rice cooker at any time, and the product's popularity exploded. By 1960, four years after its introduction, the automatic electric rice cooker was in use in about half of all Japanese households.

The success of Toshiba's automatic electric rice cookers sparked a "manufacturing war", and Matsushita Electric entered the field as early as 1956 with the EC-36. The EC-36 was a cheaper product that used a single pot, reducing the amount of metal used and making it more competitive in terms of sales.

Later, the automatic electric rice cooker was well received in Asian countries and around the world under the name "Automatic Rice Cooker". It also had a great impact on society, giving housewives more time and accelerating the women's liberation movement. On the other hand, Helen Macnaughtan argued that the invention of the automatic electric rice cooker, which freed women from menial tasks in the kitchen and allowed some women to work part-time, was not a great victory for women's liberation because it gave them more time to devote to other household tasks. Rice cookers made their way to the American market via Hawaii and California's Asian demographics in the 1950s, and especially Louisiana with the sale of Hitachi models since in the 1970s befitting the prevalence of rice dishes in its Cajun cuisine.

In 1972, a rice cooker with a heat-retention function was introduced, and in 1979, an electronic rice cooker equipped with a microcomputer that could also manage the soaking of rice after washing and the heat level. In 1988, rice cookers with electromagnetic induction heating were introduced, which provided higher heating.

== Principle of operation ==
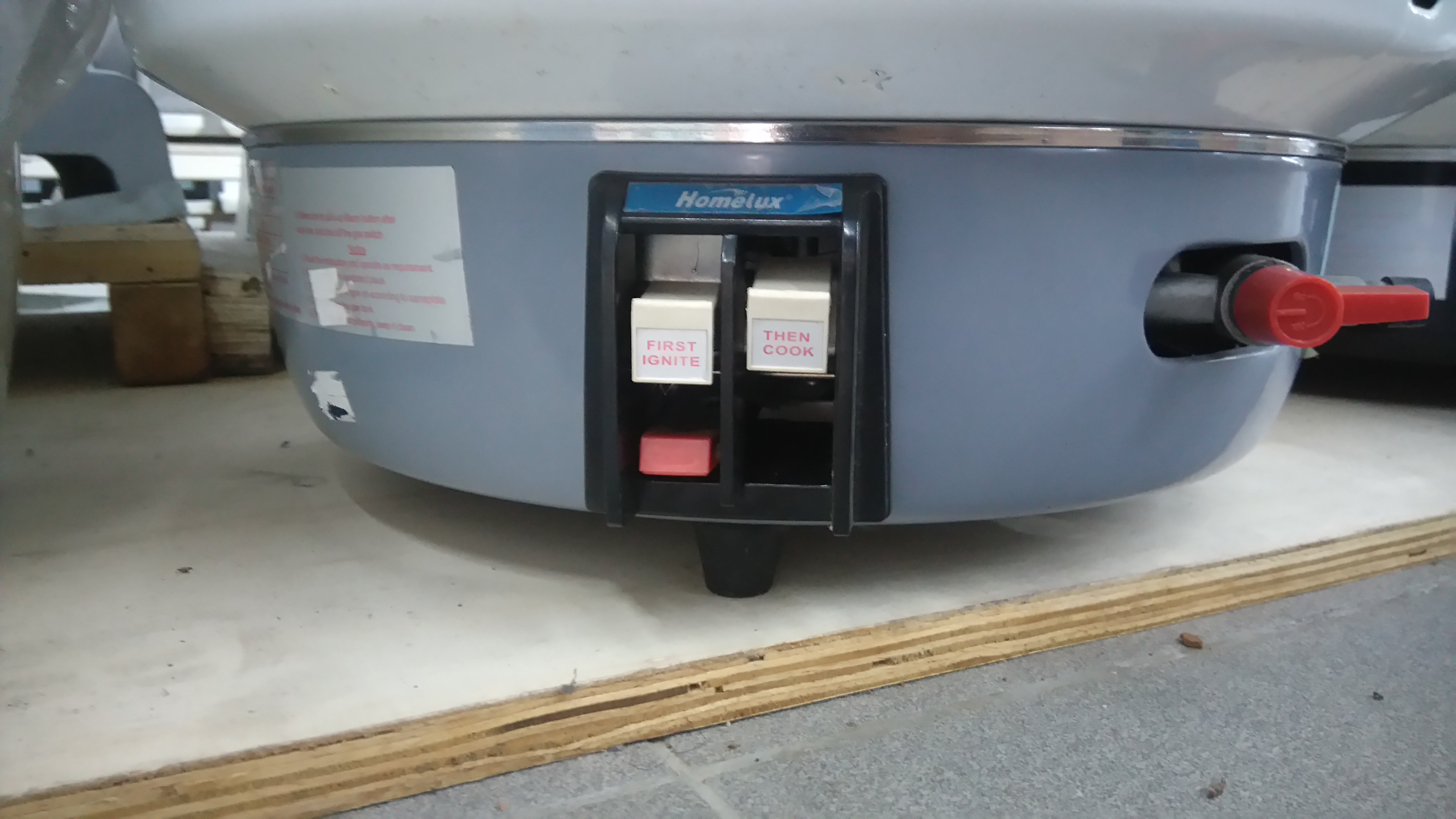
A typical commercial gas cooker. To use it, the left lever is depressed to ignite the pilot burner for standby and keep-warm purposes. To start cooking, the right lever is pushed to operate the main burner, which is ignited by the pilot burner. Like its electric counterpart, the cook lever releases automatically once the rice is fully cooked.

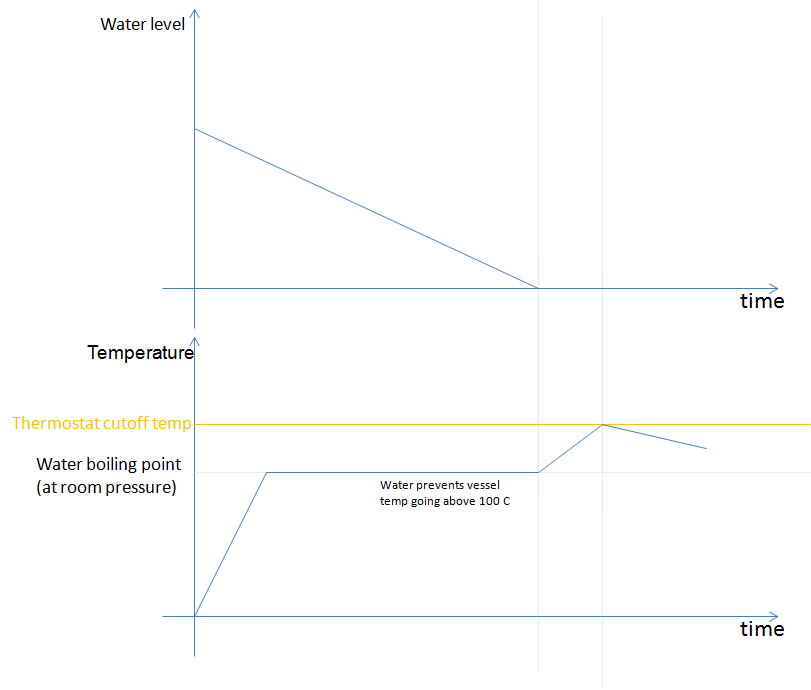
Basic principle of electric rice cooker operation

A basic rice cooker has a main body (pot), an inner cooking container which holds the rice, an electric heating element, and a thermostat.

The bowl is filled with rice and water and heated at full power; the water reaches and stays at boiling point (100 °C, 212 °F). When the water has all been absorbed, the temperature can rise above boiling point, which trips the thermostat. Some cookers switch to low-power "warming" mode, keeping the rice at a safe temperature of approximately 65 °C (150 °F); simpler models switch off; the rice has entered the resting phase.

Rice cookers are usually sold with a rice paddle and a measuring cup included. The measuring cup is typically 180 ml or roughly one gō, a traditional Japanese unit of volume.

More advanced cookers may use fuzzy logic for more detailed temperature control, induction rather than resistive heating, a steaming tray for other foods, and even the ability to rinse the rice.

=== Rice types and rice cookers ===
Brown rice generally needs longer cooking times than white rice, unless it is broken, or flourblasted (which perforates the bran).

Many models feature an ability to cook sticky rice or porridge as an added value. Most can be used as steamers. Some can be used as slow cookers. Some other models can bake bread or in some cases have an added function to maintain temperatures suitable for fermentation of bread dough or yogurt. Multi-purpose devices with rice cooking capability are not necessarily called "rice cookers", but typically "multi-cookers".

A rice cooker, or slow cooker, can be used in conjunction with a temperature probe and an external thermostat to cook food at a stable low temperature ("sous-vide").

== Other uses ==
Steam rice cookers have been shown to be effective for decontamination of face masks.

== See also ==
- Rice polisher
- Slow cooker
- Remoska, small portable oven
- Vacuum flask
- Hot water dispenser
- List of cooking appliances
- List of Japanese cooking utensils
