= Descaler =

Descaler may refer to:

- Fish scaler (Japanese: urokotori), an implement to remove scales from fish
- Descaling agent, used to remove mineral deposits from a surface
