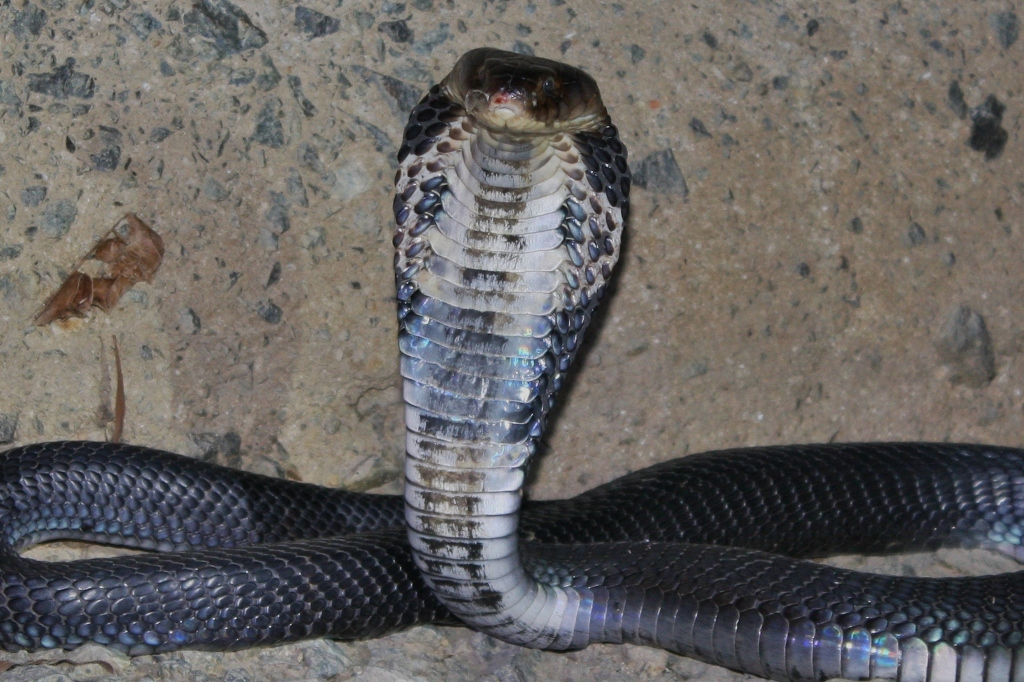

Conservation status
- Vulnerable (IUCN 3.1)
- CITES Appendix II

Scientific classification
- Kingdom: Animalia
- Phylum: Chordata
- Class: Reptilia
- Order: Squamata
- Suborder: Serpentes
- Family: Elapidae
- Genus: Naja
- Species: N. atra

Binomial name
- Naja atra Cantor, 1842
- Naja atra distribution

Synonyms
- List: Naja atra Cantor 1842; Naja tripudians var. scopinucha Cope, 1859; Naja tripudians var. unicolor Von Martens, 1876; Naia tripudians var. fasciata Boulenger, 1896; Naja naja atra Stejneger, 1907; Naja kaouthia atra Deraniyagala, 1960; Naja naja atra Golay, 1985; Naja sputatrix atra Lingenhole & Trutnau, 1989; Naja atra Ziegler, 2002; Naja (Naja) atra Wallach, 2009

= Chinese cobra =

Species of snake

The Chinese cobra (Naja atra), also called the Taiwan cobra, is a species of cobra in the family Elapidae, found mostly in southern China and a couple of neighboring nations and islands. It is one of the most prevalent venomous snakes in China, which has caused many snakebite incidents to humans.

== Etymology and names ==
Naja atra was first described by Danish physician, zoologist, and botanist Theodore Edward Cantor in 1842. The generic name naja is a Latinisation of the Sanskrit word nāgá (नाग) meaning "cobra". The specific epithet atra comes from the Latin term ater, which means "dark", "black", or "gloomy".

In Mandarin Chinese, the snake is known as Zhōnghuá yǎnjìngshé (simplified: 中华眼镜蛇, traditional: 中華眼鏡蛇, lit. "Chinese spectacled snake", i.e. Chinese cobra), Zhōushān yǎnjìngshé (舟山眼鏡蛇, lit. "Zhoushan spectacled snake", i.e. Zhoushan cobra) or, in Cantonese, faahnchaántàuh (飯鏟頭, lit. "rice paddle head"). In Taiwanese, the snake is known as pn̄g-sî-chhèng (飯匙倩/銃, lit. "rice paddle ?"), ba̍k-kiàⁿ-chôa (目鏡蛇, lit. "spectacled snake", i.e. cobra), or tn̂g-ām-chôa (長頷蛇, lit. "long-chinned snake").

== Description ==
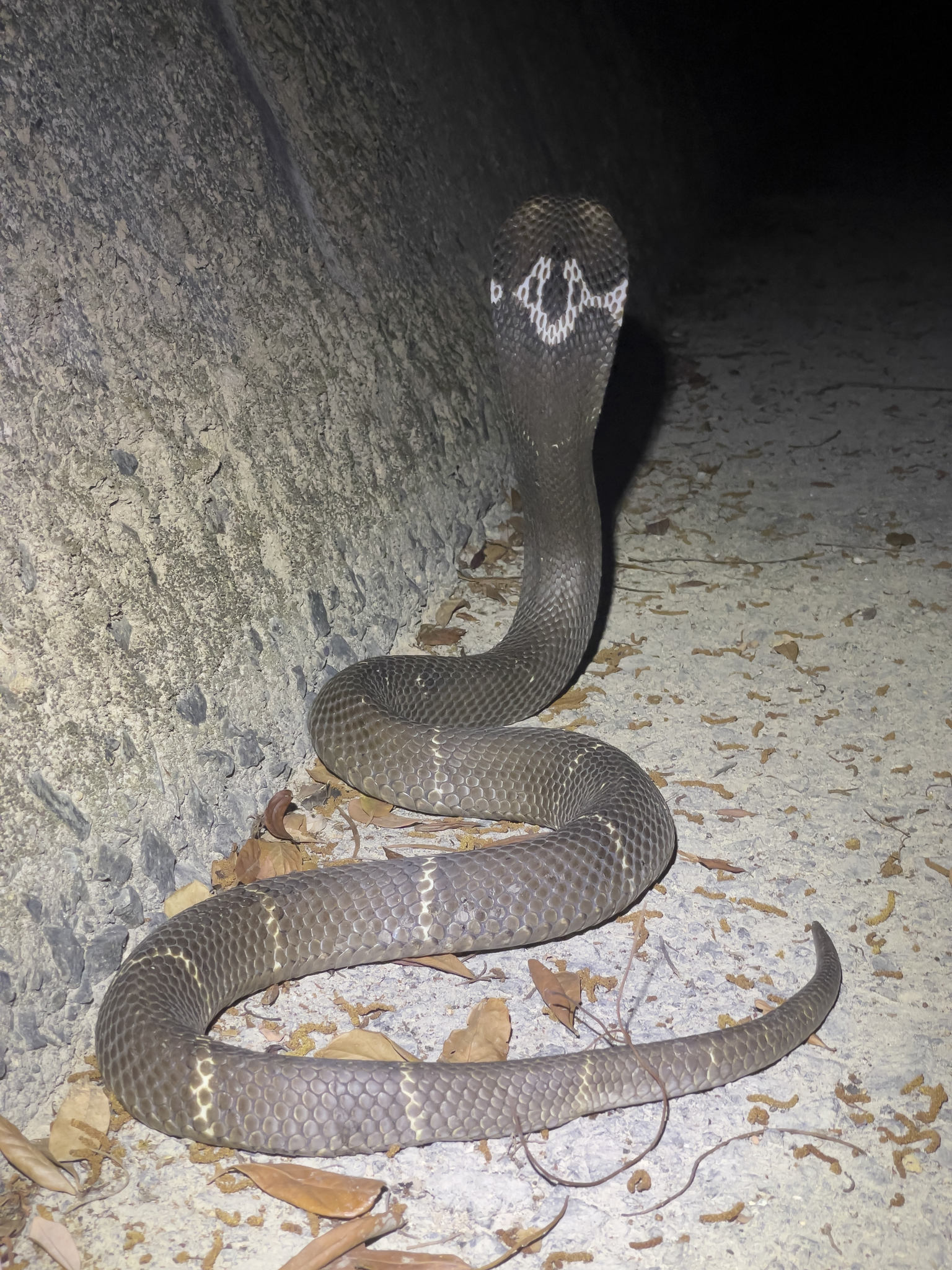
The hood pattern from behind

This medium-sized snake is usually 1.2 to 1.5 metres (3.9 to 4.9 ft) long, but they can grow to a maximum length of 2 metres (6.6 ft) though this is rare.

The hood mark shape is variable from spectacle, mask to horseshoe or O- shape and is often linked to light throat area on at least one side. The throat area is clearly defined light which is usually with a pair of clearly defined lateral spots.

The Chinese cobra is iridescent black with a number of distant transversal double lines of a yellow colour. The abdominal surface is pearl or slaty coloured. The dorsal color of the Chinese cobra is usually brown, grey or black, with or without narrow, light transverse lines at irregular intervals which are especially prominent in juveniles.

Like other elapids, this is a proteroglyphous snake with fangs that are permanently erect and are located at the anterior of the upper jaw.

=== Scalation ===
There are 23–29 scale rows around hood (usually 25–27); 19–21 just ahead mid-body (usually 21); ventral scales 161–180 (usually 171 in males, 173 in females); subcaudal scales 37–51 pairs (usually 48 in males, 46 in females). Anal scale is entire.

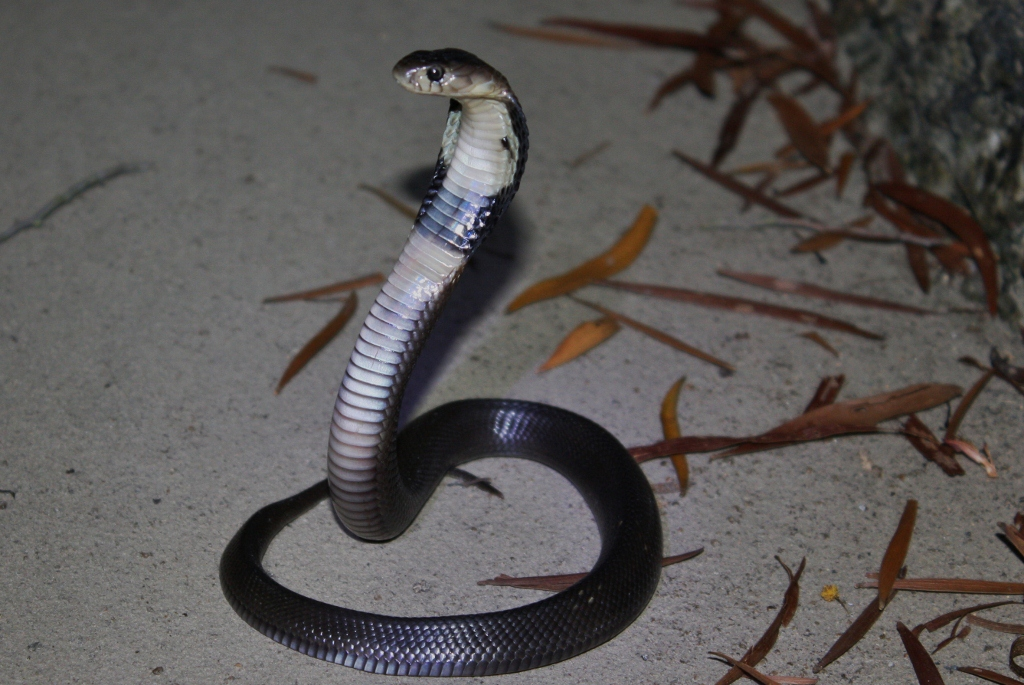
A juvenile Chinese cobra.

=== Identification ===
The Chinese cobra is sometimes confused with the Monocled cobra (Naja kaouthia), but it can be easily distinguished by virtue of having lower ventral and subcaudal scale counts, particularly when sex is taken into account.

== Distribution and habitat ==
This species is found in southeastern China (including the provinces of Sichuan, Fujian, Guangdong, Guangxi, Guizhou, Hunan, Hubei, Zhejiang, Hong Kong and the Island province of Hainan), Taiwan, northern Laos, northern Vietnam, where it is much more common in the south.

Its typical habitat is woodlands, shrublands, grasslands, and mangroves, although it is an adaptable species that is able to persist in a variety of habitats.

== Behavior ==
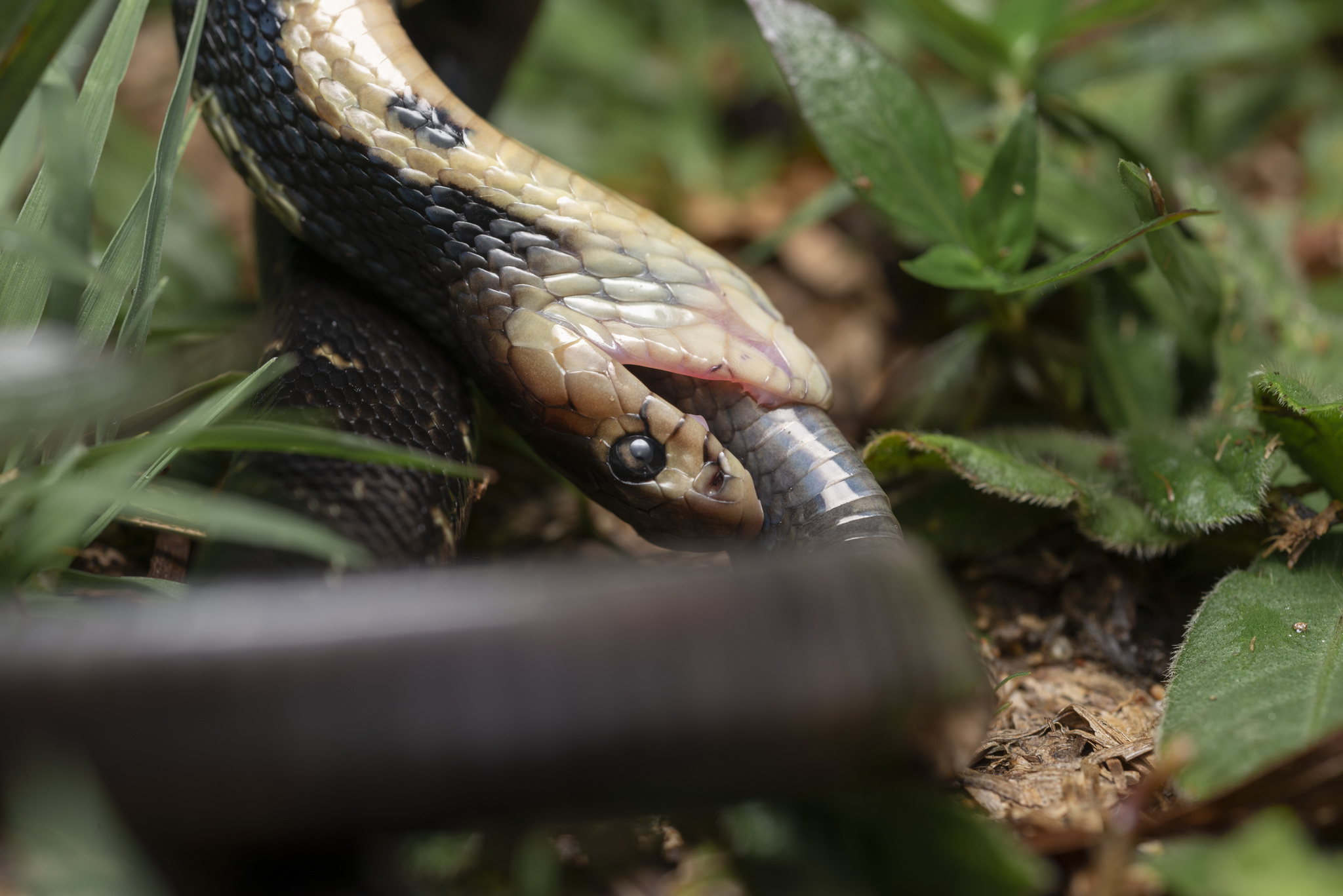
Cannibalizing another Chinese cobra

Adults can be very aggressive, but the younger tend to be more aggressive as they are more nervous to the things surrounding them. The Chinese cobra usually escapes to avoid confrontation with humans. The snake is terrestrial, diurnal and crepuscular.

== Reproduction ==
Like other species of cobra, it is an oviparous snake. Gravid females will lay between 6 and 23 eggs sometime between May through to the end of July.

== Venom ==
The Chinese cobra is a highly venomous member of the true cobras (genus Naja).

The murine LD_{50} values of its venom are 0.29 mg/kg IV and 0.53 mg/kg—0.67 mg/kg SC. The average venom yield from a snake of this species kept at a snake farm was about 250.8 mg (80 mg dry weight). According to Minton (1974), this cobra has a venom yield range of 150 to 200 mg (dry weight). Brown listed a venom yield of 184 mg (dry weight).

Local symptoms in victims caused by a Chinese cobra bite are wound darkening, localized redness and swelling, pain, insensibility, and invariably blisters and necrosis. Necrosis is a serious problem in cases of cobra bite as it may persist for many years after the general recovery of the victim. The following systemic symptoms may also occur: chest discomfort, fever, sore throat, difficulty in swallowing, loss of voice, weak feeling in limbs, walking haltingly, general ache, lockjaw, and difficulty in breathing. Fatality occasionally occurs. The antivenom is widely available and deaths are much rarer than they used to be.
