= Cartouche (disambiguation) =

A cartouche is a rounded oblong frame for royal names in Egyptian hieroglyphs.

Cartouche may also refer to:

- Cartouche (design), an oval or oblong design, typically edged with ornamental scrollwork
- Cartouche (cartography), a decorative emblem on a globe or map
- Cartouche (cooking), a disk of parchment paper used to cover food as it cooks
- Louis Dominique Bourguignon (1693–1721), French highwayman also known as Cartouche
  - Cartouche, King of Paris (also known as Cartouche), a 1950 French film about him
  - Cartouche (film), a 1962 French film about him
- Cartouche (group), a Eurodance act
- "Cartouche", a 2003 song by Blackmore's Night from Ghost of a Rose
- "Cartouche", a season 5 episode of Endeavour

== See also ==
- Cartucho, a 1931 novel by Nellie Campobello
- Cartouche box or ammunition box
- Cartridge (disambiguation)
