= Agemono =

Agemono may refer to:

- Agemono, a category of deep-fried dishes in Japanese cuisine
- Agemono nabe, a pot used to cook agemono dishes
