= Rice-cooking utensils =

Tools used for cooking rice

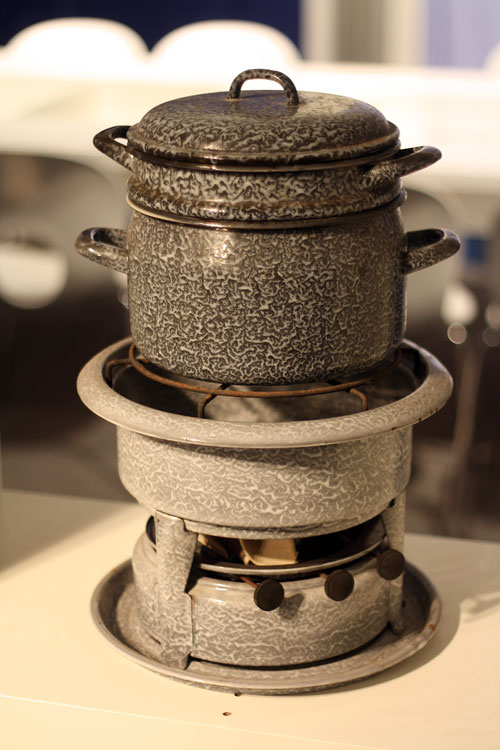
Old type of rice cooker commonly used in the Netherlands by residents of the former Dutch East Indies (now: Indonesia) in the 1950s. Showcase on display at the Eurasian festival Tong Tong Fair 2012.

Rice-cooking utensils are tools used for cooking rice and similar foods.

Dedicated rice-cooking utensils have a long history. A ceramic rice steamer dated to 1250 BC is on display in the British Museum.

== Rice cooking methods ==
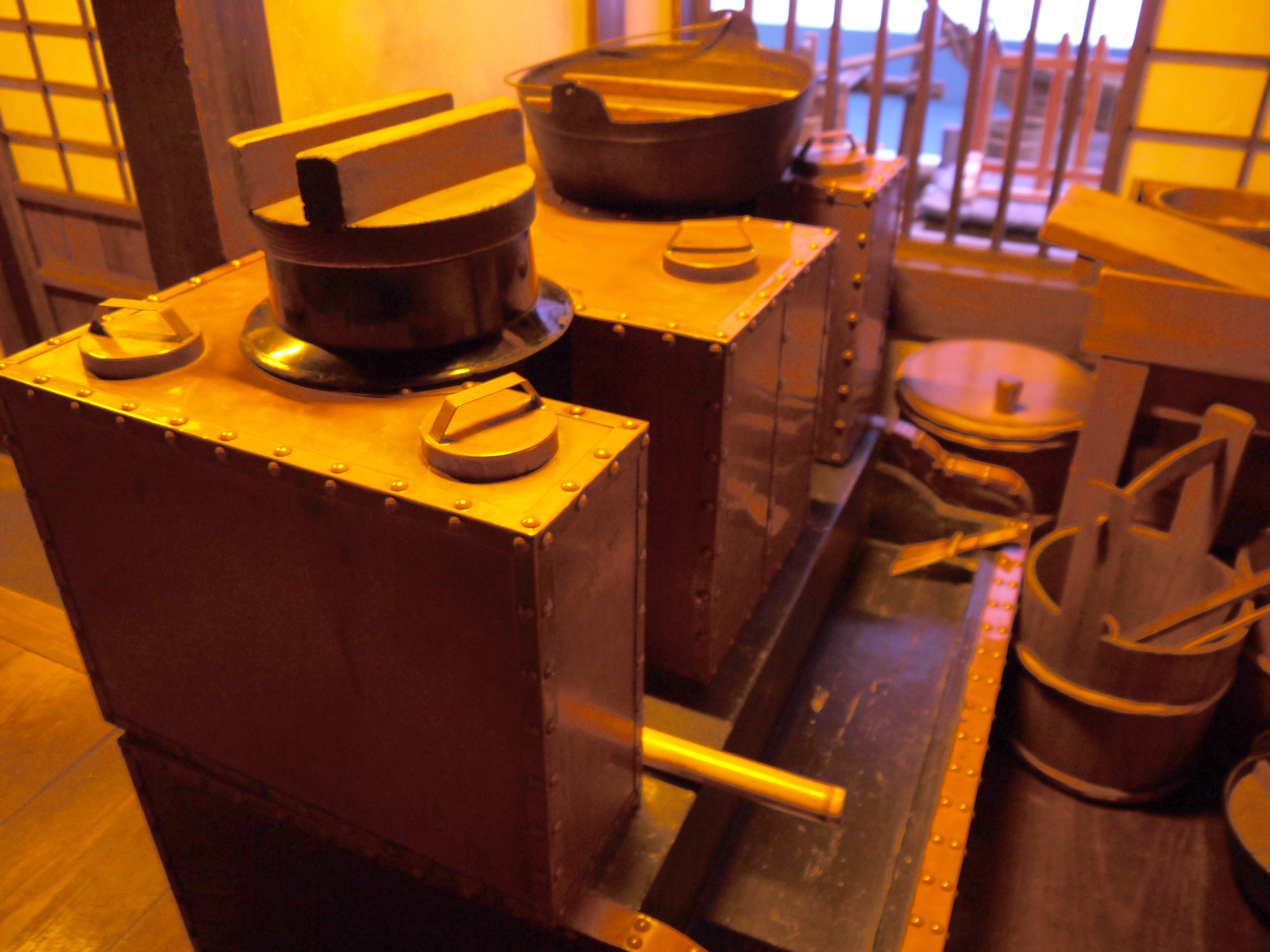
Rice cooker of the Edo period in the Fukagawa Edo Museum

Rice absorbs a great deal of water as it cooks, expanding its volume and using up the cooking water. The moisture and heat gelatinize and soften the starch granules in the rice. The cooking time for raw rice (not parboiled beforehand) ranges from about 15 minutes and up, depending upon the type and freshness of rice, method, and desired result (from separate grains to disintegrated porridge). Some rices, such as white rice, long-grain rice and African rice, break up more easily. Some cooking methods are more likely to break the rice (fragmenting it with a mortar and pestle before cooking, or stirring frequently). Some rice is stickier. Most recipes will therefore not work for all rices.

Rice can be cooked by heating in boiling water or steam, or a combination of both (boiling until water evaporates, then continuing in steam generated by continued heating).

Rice cooking utensils may be divided into

- boiling: dolsot, gamasot, saucepans or pots (risotto pan, porridge pot)
- steaming: bamboo steamer, siru, couscoussier
- boiling and steaming: rice cookers, Asian traditional rice cooker on hearth, i.e., 釜
  - baking: paella pan, pilaf pan
  - microwaving: ceramic or plastic containers for microwave ovens

== Cutlery ==
Rice paddles are made specifically to scoop rice.

== Microwave rice cookers ==
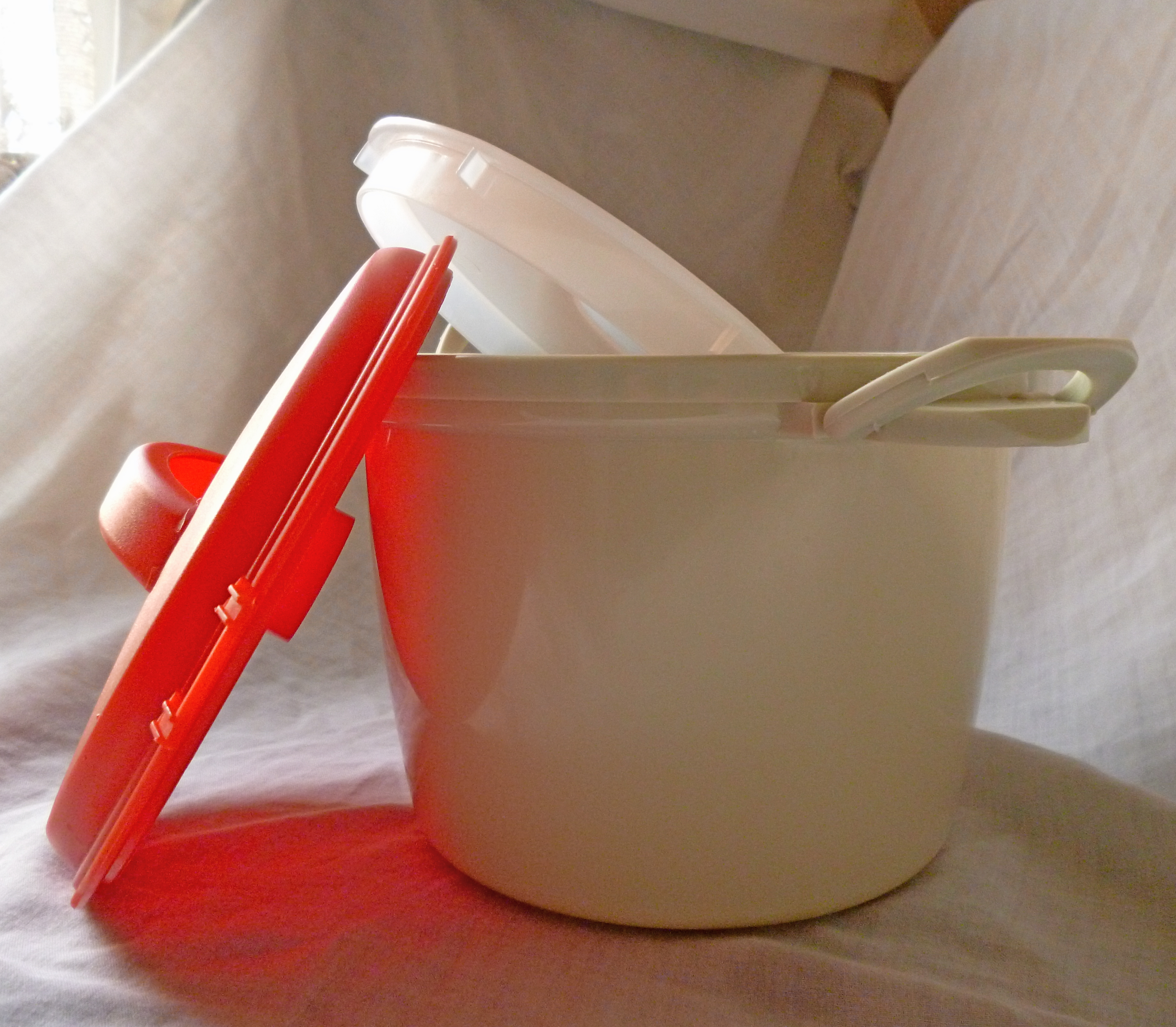
Microwave pot for cooking rice

A microwave rice cooker is a container designed specifically for cooking rice. Some container consists of three parts: an outer bowl, a fitted lid with steam vents, and an inner bowl with a finely perforated base. Some others have only one container and the double-layered lid fitted with a steam vent.

A measured amount of dry rice is placed within the bowl. For long-grain rice or scented rice (e.g., basmati rice, Thai jasmine rice), neither washing nor soaking is usually necessary unless contaminating dirt is suspected. For Japanese rice (e.g., Calrose or medium/short grain rice), the rice is washed to remove surface starch powder and the trace of rice bran from the grains. For washing, a generous amount of water is added to the rice then the mixture is stirred a few times with a hand quickly. The water is then drained immediately while the lighter starch is still in the water, and the heavier rice grains settle at the bottom of the container. The washing process may need to be repeated up to three times until the water draining out is clear of starch. Excessive washing, however, is believed to be detrimental, since it will remove too many water-soluble nutrients, e.g., vitamins.

With the three-part model, the inner bowl is then placed within the outer bowl and a small amount of water is added, so that the rice is just about covered. The lid is then fitted and the cooker is microwaved at full power for between 8 and 15 minutes (depending on the rice type, power output of the appliance and personal texture preference). Cooking occurs with the water boiling away and steaming the grains. It is very important to follow the manufacturer's instructions regarding the length of time and amount of water added, otherwise the rice can burn. This method works well with long-grain rice that does not release much starch and is conventionally cooked with the boil/strain or steam methods.

Microwave rice cookers can also be used for cooking Japanese rice, or medium- or short grain rice, but the absorption method should be used. The rice is washed well to remove starch and allowed to stand to absorb water for at least 15 min before cooking. The water absorption step is essential, otherwise the cooking may result in cooked rice which is still too hard. The regular amount of water as the conventional cooking method can be used. The container is placed in the microwave and it is brought up to the boil at high power. Then, it can be cooked at low or low-medium power until all the water is evaporated (about 20 min - 30 min, depending on the rice type) and not much steam is coming out. The container is then left to stand for 5 min before the rice is stirred for serving.
