= Fumiko Minami =

Japanese inventor of the rice cooker (1913/4 – 1959)

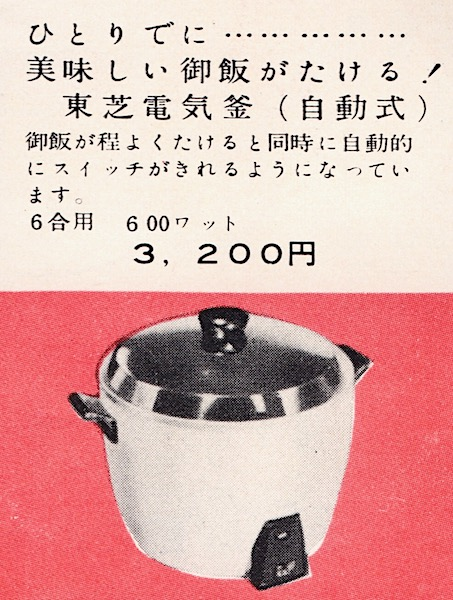
1956 advert for the rice cooker developed by the Minamis

Fumiko Minami (1913/4 – 1959) was a Japanese housewife who contributed to the invention of the electric rice cooker.

== Life ==
Fumiko Minami was born in 1913/14 into a family of a 'high-ranked warrior class', and moved to Tokyo with her father, who had lost the family's money. While she was working in a restaurant, she met Yoshitada Minami (ja), the owner of a small family factory which sold water boilers to Toshiba. They married and had six children.

== Rice cooker ==
In the 1950s, Toshiba began a project to improve on the electric rice cooker. Models had been available since the 1920s, but they had sold poorly as they still needed the heat to be turned off manually, and therefore monitored to prevent the rice from burning. While selling electric washing machines across Japan, Toshiba engineer Shogo Yamada learned that women found cooking rice three times a day, continuously adjusting the heat to achieve fluffy rice, even more time consuming then laundry.

Yoshitada Minami was asked by Yamada to try to develop a better rice cooker, and accepted the task because his water boiler factory was struggling and on the brink of bankruptcy.

Fumiko Minami carried out market research into the rice cookers already available and spent five years experimenting with factors such as water ratio and temperature in rice cooking to provide information vital to the development of the device. For example, she found that the convention of continuously adjusting the temperature was not necessary, but that cooking rice at the same temperature for twenty minutes would consistently produce good results.

The Minamis wanted their rice cooker to work in all the conditions that could be found across Japan, so Fumiko tested prototypes in various conditions: on the roof of their house in the sun; next to a steamy bathroom; and inside a kotatsu. Her health suffered while testing the rice cooker outdoors in winter.

The Minamis eventually produced a two-pot rice cooker with a bi-metallic switch that stopped the cooking when the temperature in the pot exceeded 100 °C. They included a triple-layer cover to insulate it in winter. The model was launched in 1955.

Fumiko Minami's aim was to save women time so that ‘they could do something else for three hours a day’. When she was bedridden in 1959, she received letters from women expressing their gratitude for their rice cookers. She died that year at the age of 45.
