= Udon kiri =

Japanese knife for cutting noodles

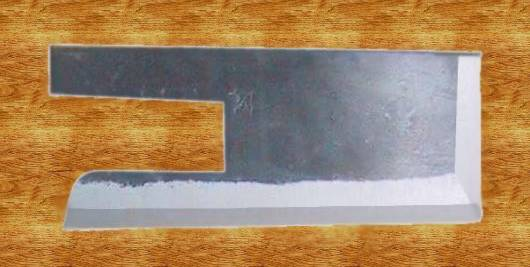
Udonkiri

The udonkiri (うどん切), sobakiri (そば切 or 蕎麦切り包丁), and kashikiri are a group of specialized knives used in the Japanese kitchen to make udon and soba noodles respectively. The udonkiri is also sometimes called menkiribocho (麺切り包丁), and is distinguished from the Soba and Kashikiri knives by a blade that drops in to cover less than half of the length of the handle rather that reaching the end of the handle like the soba. The sobakiri is characterized by a long blade that spans down the full length of the handle whereas the blade of the kashikiri only curves to meet the top of the handle. To make soba or udon the dough is flattened and folded, and then cut with the menkiribocho to produce long rectangular noodles. For this purpose the menkiribocho has a straight and long cutting edge to cut the noodles straight to the board. The knife is usually heavy to aid in the cutting of the noodles, usually with a slight forward motion.

== See also ==
- Japanese kitchen knife
- List of Japanese cooking utensils
