= Abura kiri =

Japanese kitchen utensil

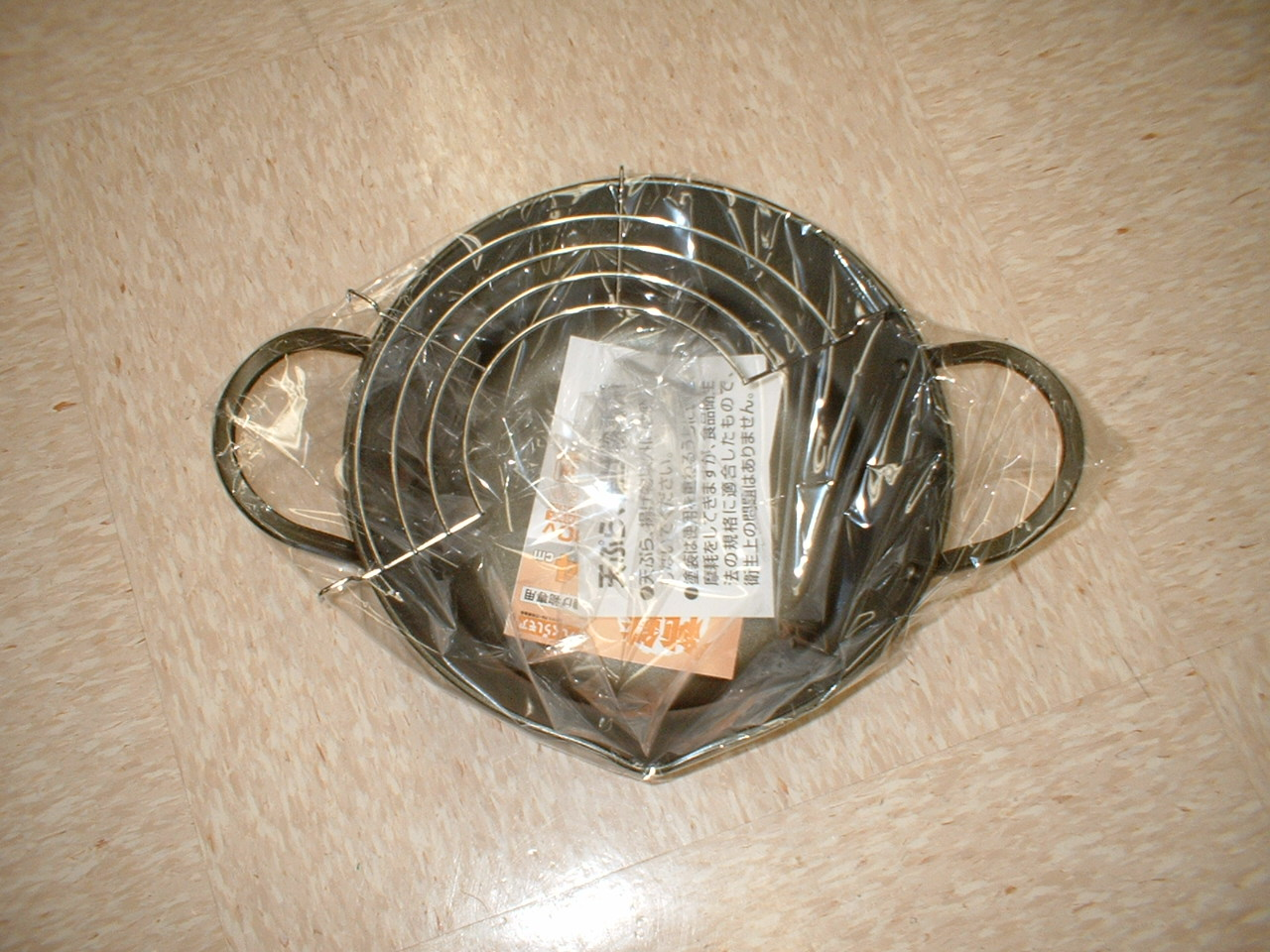
Tempura nabe with abura kiri

Abura kiri (油きり) is a shallow tray used in Japanese cooking to place food on after deep frying. The shallow tray or pan has a rack and an absorbent paper towel to remove excess oil from the food after frying, for example in tempura.

The abura kiri is usually used in combination with metal ended Japanese kitchen chopsticks, a net ladle or scoop (ami jakushi), and a heavy frying pot (agemono nabe).

== See also ==
- List of Japanese cooking utensils
