= Otoshi buta =

Japanese wood drop-lid for cooking

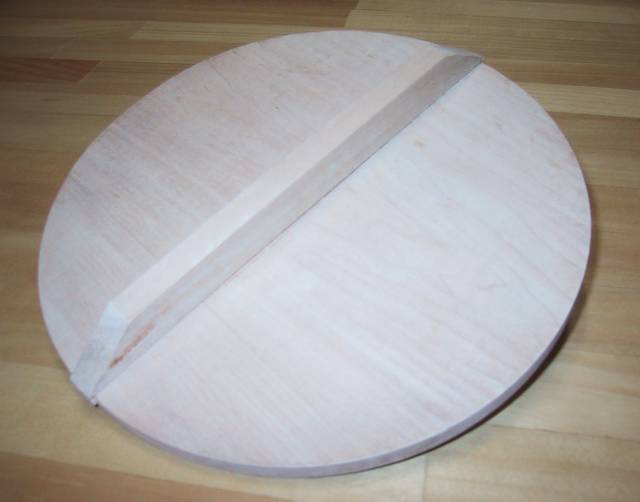
Otoshi buta (17 cm diameter)

Otoshi buta (落し蓋, lit. 'drop-lid') are Japanese-style drop-lids for use in Japanese cooking. These round lids float on top of the liquid in a pot while simmering foods. They ensure that the heat is evenly distributed and reduce the tendency of liquid to boil with large bubbles. This reduces the mechanical stress on the food and keeps fragile ingredients in their original shape.

Otoshi buta are almost always made from wood, so they have to be soaked in water for a few minutes before use to avoid absorbing the flavor of the dish and disturbing the flavor of the next dish cooked using the otoshi buta. After use, the otoshi buta is washed and dried completely before storing.

Though it depends on the recipe and food being cooked, otoshi buta may be substituted with a sheet of tough cooking paper or aluminum foil.

== See also ==
- List of Japanese cooking utensils
- Cartouche (cooking)
