= Hangiri =

Japanese wooden rice tub

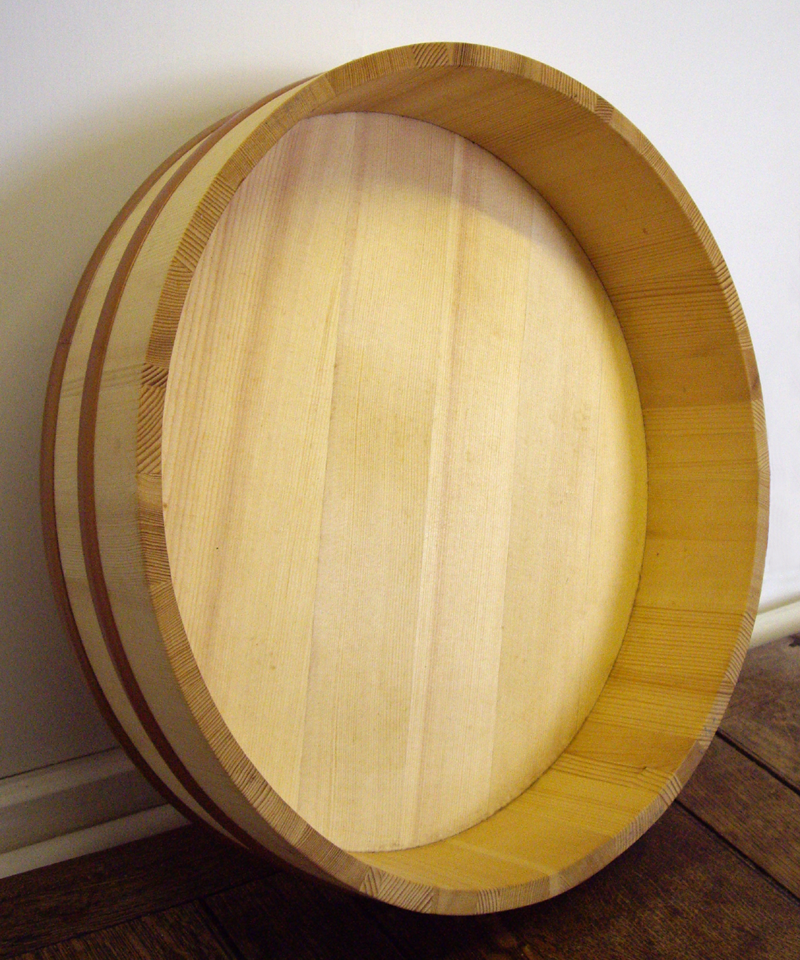
A hangiri. This example is 41 cm (16 in) in diameter.

In Japanese cuisine, a sushi oke (寿司桶), also known as a hangiri, is a round, flat-bottomed wooden tub or barrel used in the final steps of preparing rice for sushi. Traditional hangiri are made from cypress wood bound with two copper bands. They range in diameter from about 30 cm (12 in) for use at home, to 1 m (3 ft 3 in) for use in a restaurant.

A shamoji wooden paddle is used with a hangiri to dress and to cool the rice. After cooking, the rice is transferred to the hangiri where it is tossed with a dressing made of rice vinegar, sugar, and salt. When the mixing is complete, it is covered with a cloth and allowed to cool.
