= Braising =

Combination-cooking method using wet and dry heat

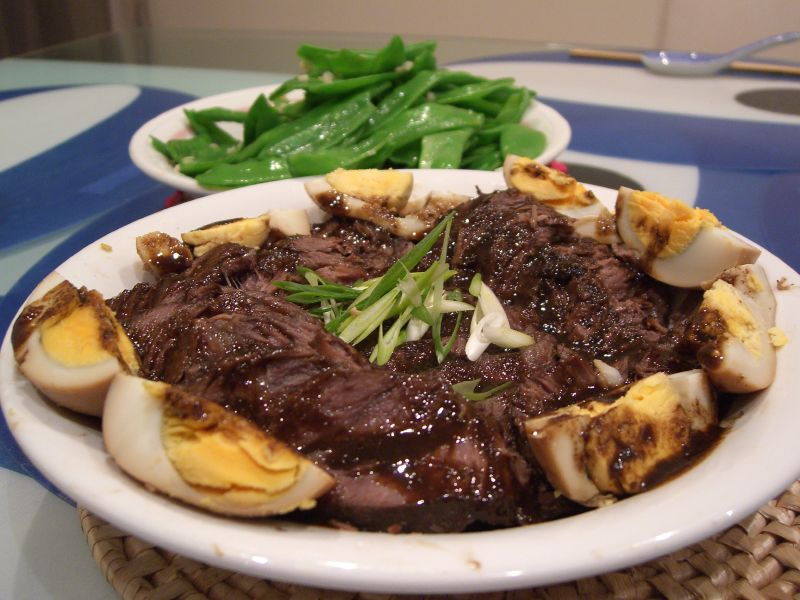
Braised ox cheek in star anise and soy sauce

Braising (from the French word braiser) is a combination cooking method that uses both wet and dry heats: typically, the food is first browned at a high temperature, then simmered in a covered pot in cooking liquid (such as wine, broth, coconut milk, or beer). It is similar to stewing, but braising is done with less liquid and usually used for larger cuts of meat. Braising of meat is often referred to as pot roasting, though some authors make a distinction between the two methods, based on whether additional liquid is added. Osso buco and coq au vin are well known braised meat dishes, and the technique can also be used to prepare fish, tempeh, tofu, or fruits and vegetables.

== Techniques ==
Most braises follow the same basic steps. The food to be braised (meats, vegetables, mushrooms, etc.) is first pan-seared to brown its surface and enhance its flavor (through the Maillard reaction). If the food will not produce enough liquid of its own, a certain amount of cooking liquid that often includes an acidic element (e.g., tomatoes, beer, balsamic vinegar, wine) is added to the pot, often with stock. A classic braise is done with a relatively whole cut of meat, and the braising liquid will cover two-thirds of the food in the pan. The dish is then covered and cooked with a lid or cartouche at a very low simmer until the meat becomes so tender that it can be "cut" with just the gentlest of pressure from a fork (versus a knife). Often the cooking liquid is finished to create a sauce or gravy as well.

Sometimes foods with high water content (particularly vegetables) can be cooked in their own juices, making the addition of liquid unnecessary.

Despite a common misconception that braising adds moisture to meat, the opposite is true, and the appearance of moisture comes from gentle cooking breaking down connective tissue and collagen, which lubricates and tenderizes fibers.

== Braised foods ==
Braising is used extensively in the cuisines of Asia, particularly Chinese cuisine and Vietnamese cuisine, where soy sauce (or, in Vietnam, soy sauce and fish sauce) is often added to the braising liquid.

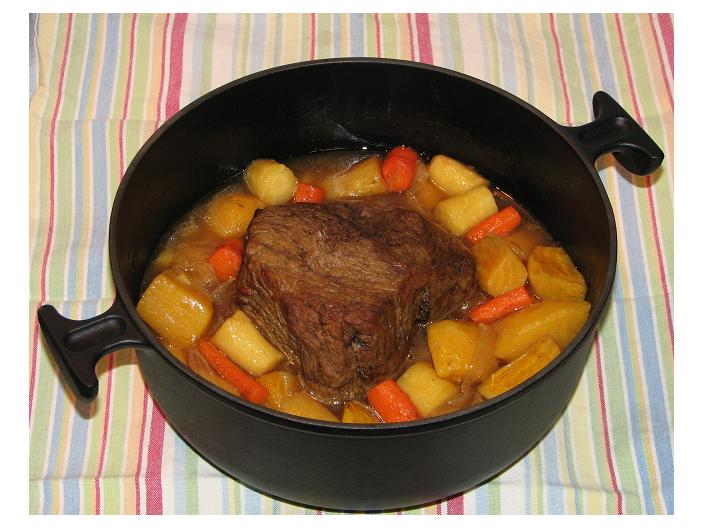
Braised pot roast

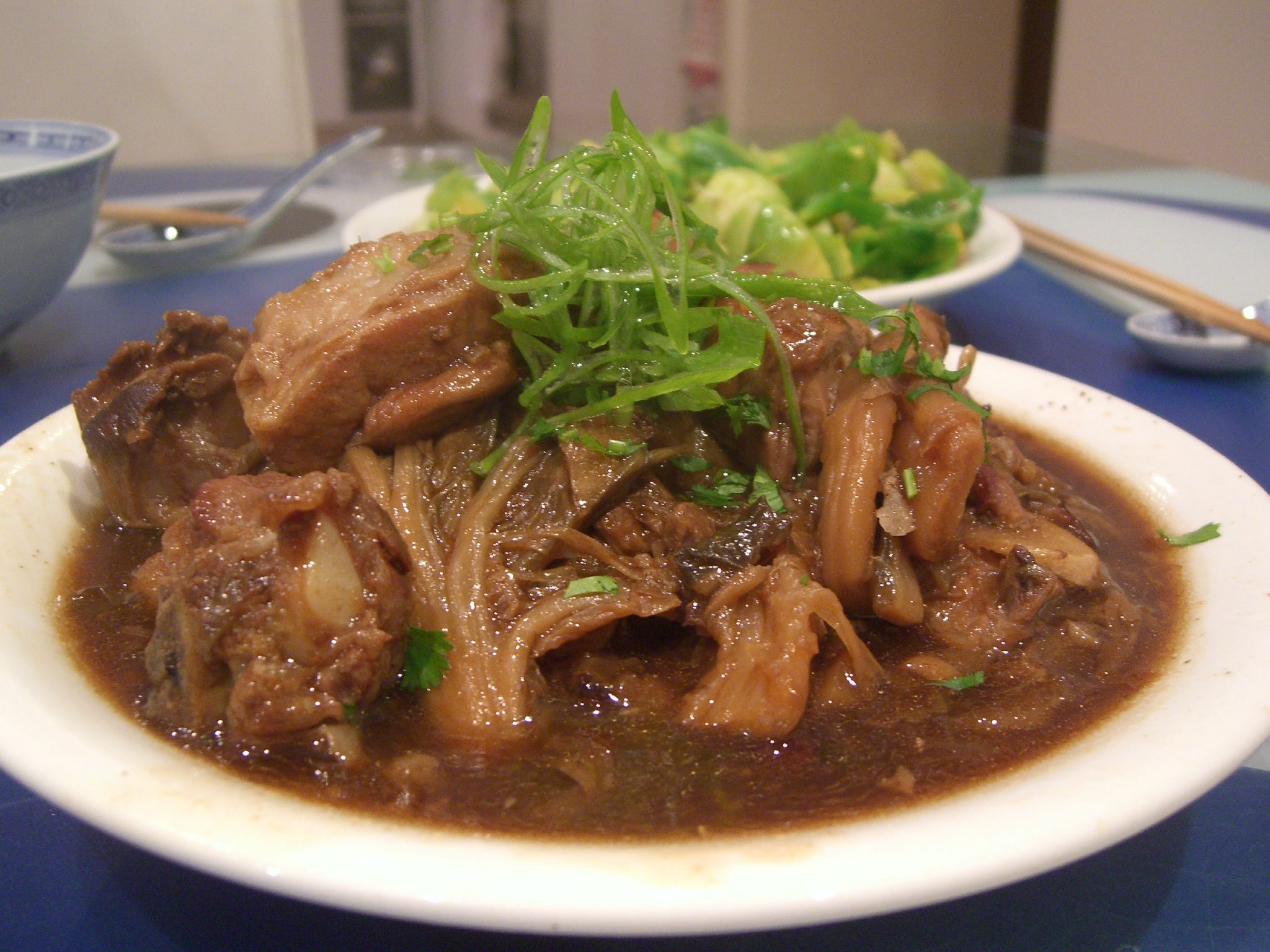
Chinese braised pork spare ribs with preserved mustard greens

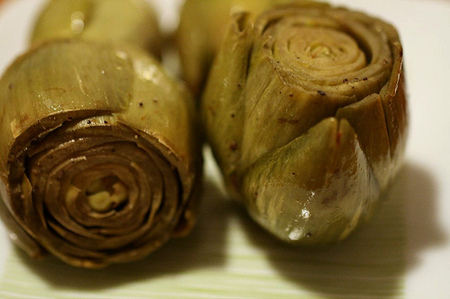
Braised baby artichokes

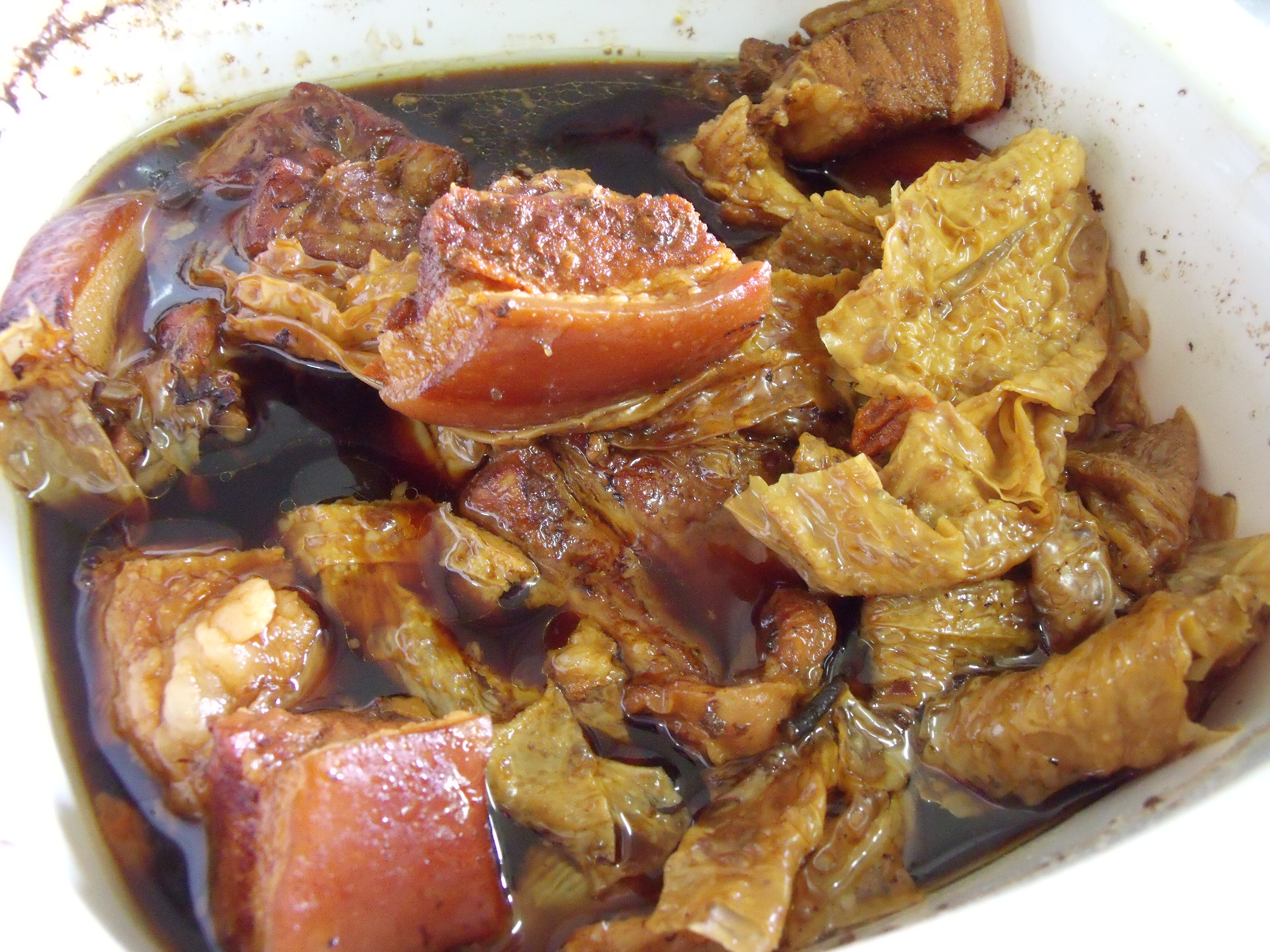
Chinese braised pork belly

== See also ==
- Adobo
- Hot pot
- Jorim
- Jugging
- Kho (cooking technique)
- Lancashire hotpot
- Lou mei
- Pot roast
- Red cooking
- Stew
