= Agemono nabe =

Thick Japanese pot used for deep frying

Agemono nabe (揚げ物鍋, lit. 'pot for fried things') are very thick pots used for deep frying in the Japanese kitchen. They are made usually of either cast iron or heavy brass. The thickness ensures an even temperature of the oil inside of the pot.

The agemono nabe is usually used in combination with metal-ended Japanese kitchen chopsticks, a net ladle or scoop ami shakushi, and a tool to drain the oil after frying abura kiri.

== See also ==
- List of Japanese cooking utensils
