= Urokotori =

Japanese kitchen utensil

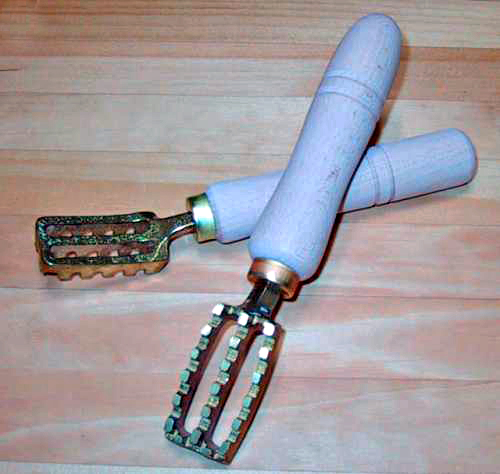
Two urokotori of slightly different sizes

A urokotori (うろこ取り, 'scale remover') is a utensil used in Japanese cuisine to remove the scales from the skin of fish before cooking. Although it is possible to remove the scales with a knife, this is more difficult and there is a higher risk of cutting the skin of the fish, especially with small fishes; knife-scaling also risks cutting one's hand.

The urokotori is pulled across the skin of the fish from the tail to the head repeatedly to remove the scales.

== See also ==
- List of Japanese cooking utensils
