= Tamagoyaki =

Japanese rolled omelettes

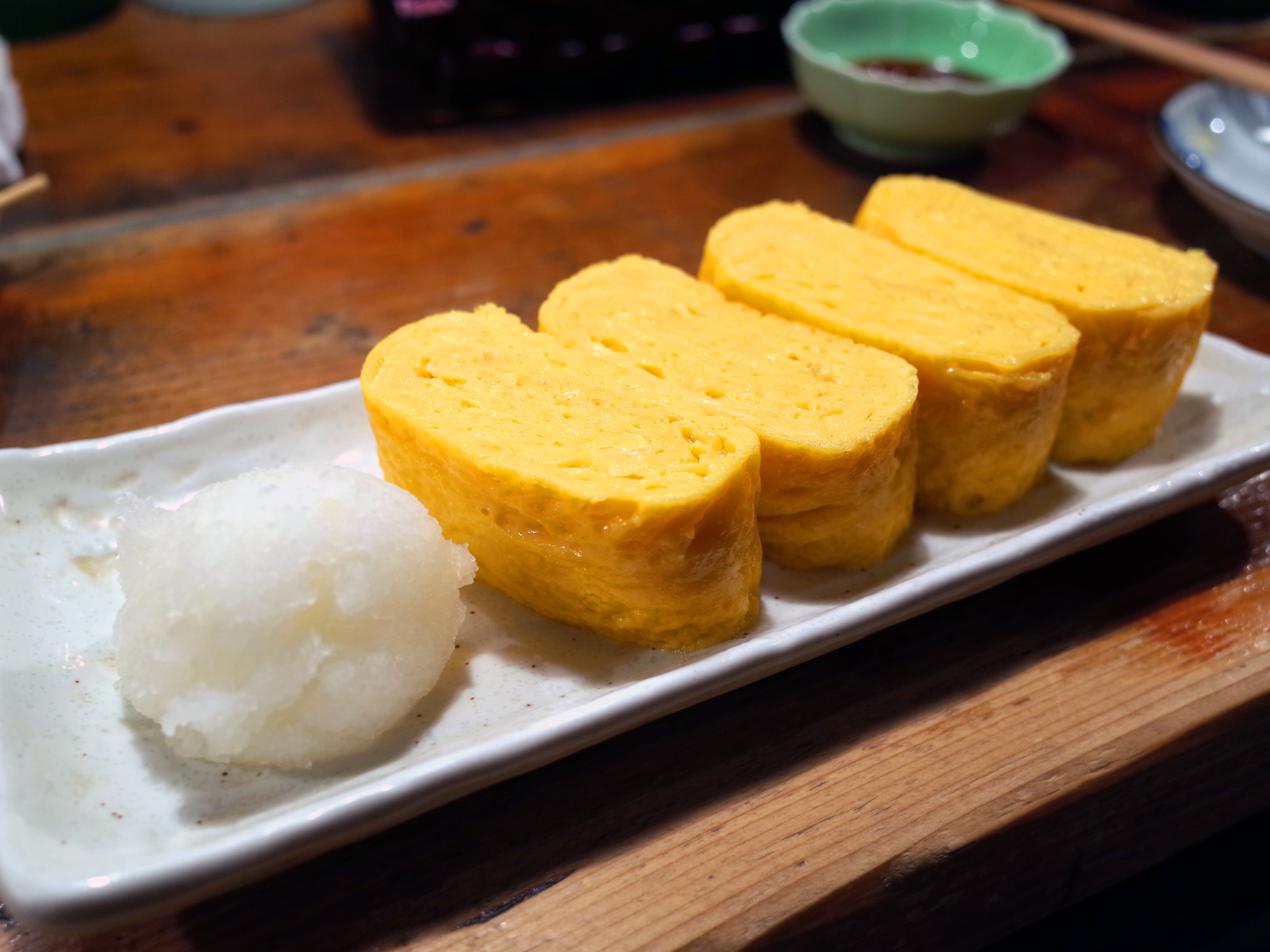
- Tamagoyaki in Tokyo
- Type: Omelette
- Course: Breakfast
- Place of origin: Japan
- Main ingredients: Egg
- Variations: Usuyaki-tamago, kinshi-tamago, iri-tamago

Tamagoyaki (卵焼き or 玉子焼き; literally 'grilled egg') is a type of Japanese omelette made by rolling together several layers of fried beaten eggs. It is often prepared in a rectangular omelette pan called a makiyakinabe or tamagoyaki. The word "tamago" means egg in Japanese, and the word "yaki" means to be cooked over direct heat.

== History ==
Chicken and chicken eggs were first consumed in Japan in the early Edo period (1603–1867), when the ban on eating chicken meat and eggs was lifted. The tamagoyaki first appeared as a food for the chōnin (townspeople) of the Edo period. At that time, it was called "tamago fuwafuwa" and was made by boiling soup broth made by leaching umami ingredients from konbu (edible kelp) and katsuobushi (dried bonito flakes), adding beaten egg, and steaming. Ōgiya (扇屋), a famous tamagoyaki shop that opened in Ōji in 1648 and is still in business today, appears in Utagawa Hiroshige's ukiyo-e "Edo kōmei kaitei zukushi" (江戸高名会亭尽) and in the rakugo story performance "Ōji no kitsune" (王子の狐). Ōji and Asukayama, famous for cherry blossoms, were lined with ryōtei (traditional Japanese restaurants) and teahouses, and Ōgiya was one of them.

Tamagoyaki became popular in Japan in the 1950s, when the government encouraged parents to feed their children more protein, and farmers started raising more chickens. By the 1960s, tamagoyaki was so popular with Japanese children that there was a common saying within Japan that tamagoyaki was one of three things most loved by Japanese children, along with the Giants (a Japanese baseball team) and Taiho (a sumo wrestler).

== Ingredients ==
- Eggs
- Japanese soup stock
- Soy sauce
- Sugar

== Preparation ==
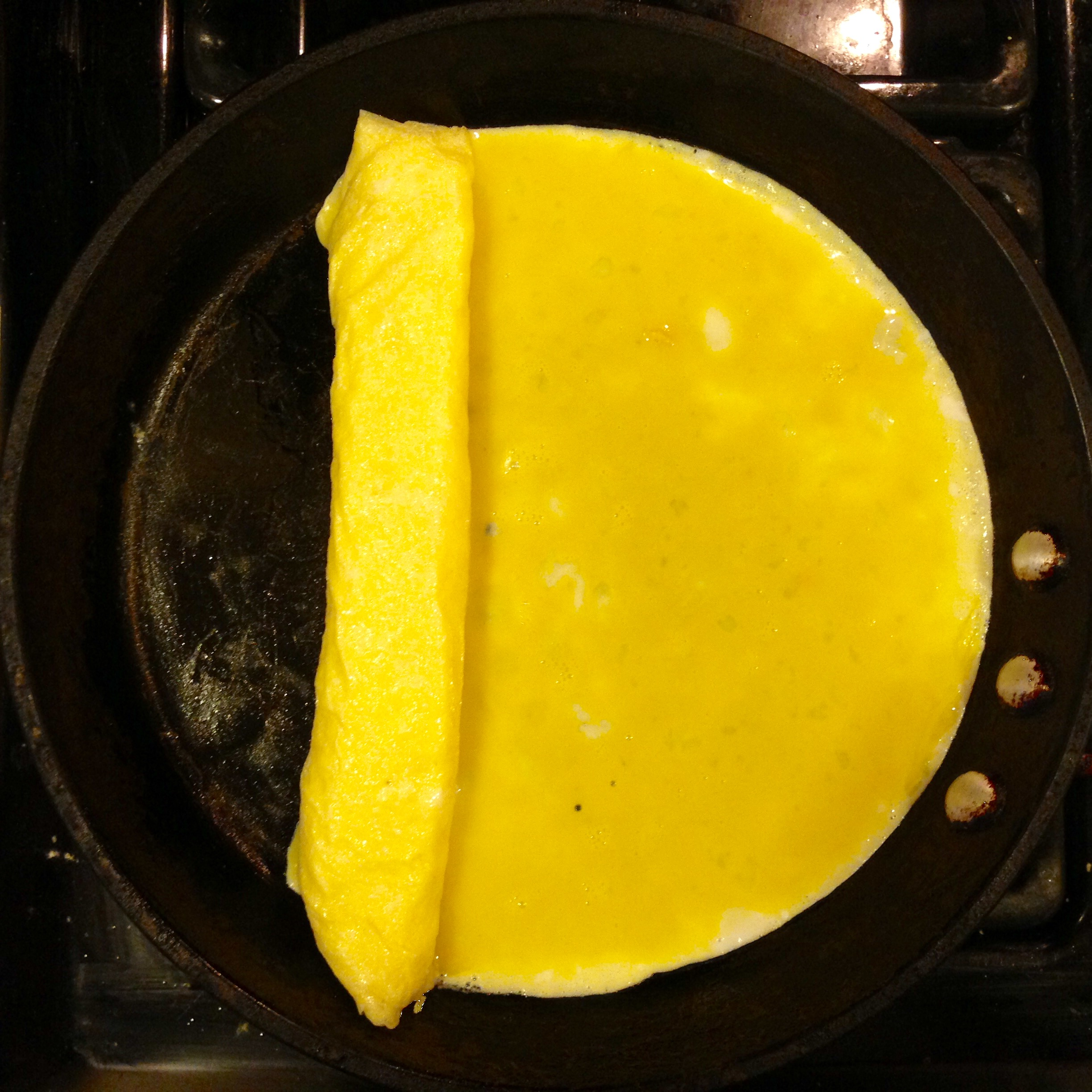
Eggs are heated in a pan, then rolled

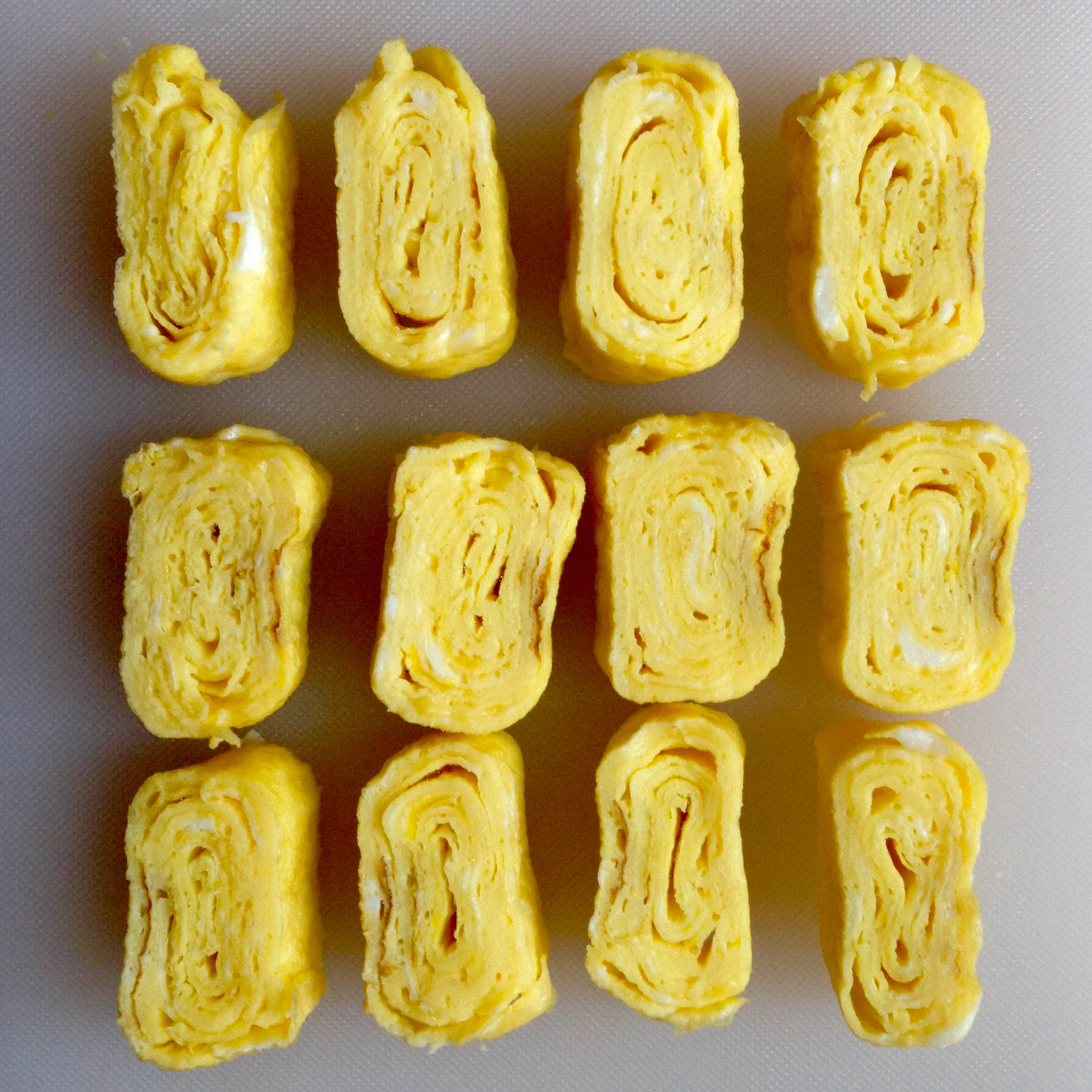
Rolls are sliced into tamagoyaki

There are several types of tamagoyaki. It is made by combining eggs, sugar and salt. Additionally, soy sauce and mirin are used in some recipes.

Alternative versions include "dashimaki tamago" which adds dashi to the egg mix, a stock of dried bonito and kelp, or a version including a mix of shrimp puree, grated mountain yam, sake, and egg, turned into a custard-like cake.

== Serving options ==
In Japan, tamagoyaki is commonly served as a breakfast dish.

=== Sushi ===
Tamagoyaki is served around the world in the form of nigiri, and also appears in many types of sushi rolls. In the days when most sushi establishments made their own tamagoyaki, known as gyoku in sushi parlance, connoisseur customers would order the tamago sushi prior to starting their meal to assess the sushi chef's skills.

Large futomaki rolls often use tamagoyaki as an ingredient.

== Similar dishes ==
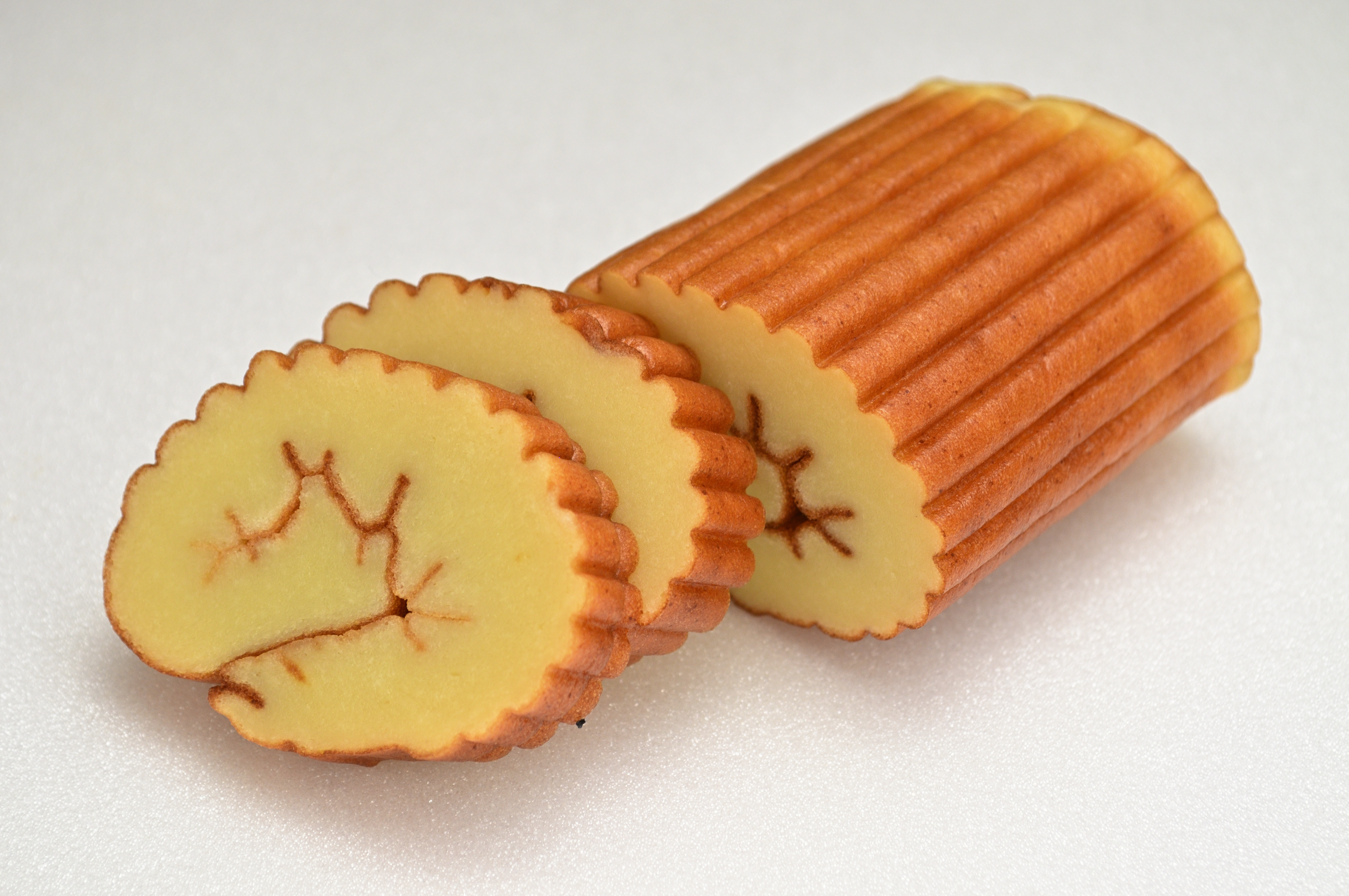
Datemaki

In Japan, there are several similar dishes to tamagoyaki, such as usuyaki-tamago, kinshi-tamago, and iri-tamago. They differ by their thicknesses, and the manner in which they are fried. Usuyaki-tamago is thinner, kinshi-tamago is a kind of usuyaki-tamago that is cut like fine threads, and iri-tamago is similar to scrambled eggs.

Datemaki (伊達巻)(ja), traditionally eaten on New Year's, is prepared similarly to tamagoyaki, but incorporates fish paste or hanpen into the batter.

== See also ==
- Gyeran-mari
- Okonomiyaki
- Akashiyaki
- Makisu
- Japanese cuisine
