= Cartouche (cooking) =

Parchment paper lid

A cartouche is a piece of parchment paper cut into a disk that is used to cover food during cooking. The paper traps steam while allowing some to escape out the sides and center.

When using cookware, lids can be placed on, off, or ajar. By covering with a lid, steam within a pot or pan cooks food, preventing reduction and browning. Compared to such a method, using a cartouche reduces cooking time and produces a more evenly cooked final product. This is because lids more easily absorb energy than parchment paper, producing condensation on the lid and reducing the amount of steam that is cooking the food. The condensation's uneven distribution also creates cool areas, reducing consistency. Leaving a lid ajar can create some similar effects and requires less effort, although it can be difficult to establish how open it should be to release a desired amount of steam, and the steam is released unevenly. When used to cover a sauce, a cartouche prevents a skin from forming. They may be used to braise or poach foods.

Preparing a cartouche requires a square of parchment paper larger than the cooking vessel. It is folded in half twice, creating a smaller square, then folded diagonally repeatedly to form an elongated triangle. Holding the triangle's most acute point at the center of the cookware, the side is trimmed to allow the parchment to fit snugly, and the triangle's tip is cut off. Unfolding the paper reveals a disk with a small vent at the center. In some applications, cartouches are directly buttered before being used. They are single-use for hygiene purposes.

== See also ==
- En papillote
- Otoshi buta

== Source ==
- The Culinary Institute of America (2011). The Professional Chef (9th ed.). Hoboken, New Jersey: Wiley. ISBN 978-0-470-42 135-2.
- Gritzer, Daniel (January 8, 2025). "How to Make a Parchment Paper Lid That'll Transform All Your Winter Stews". Serious Eats. Archived from the original on 3 May 2025.
- Hansen, James (3 December 2023). "Upgrade Your Poaching Experience With The Help Of Parchment Paper". The Daily Meal. Archived from the original on 2 September 2024.
- "Using a Parchment Cartouche Instead of a Lid". America's Test Kitchen. Archived from the original on 23 July 2023.
