= Makisu =

Japanese woven mat used in food preparation

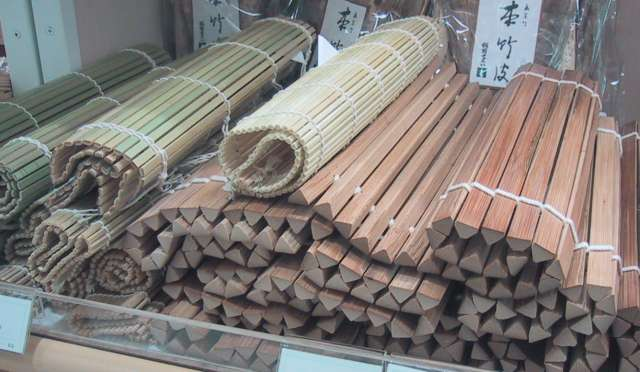
A selection of makisu mats with bamboo sticks of different thicknesses

In Japanese cooking, a makisu (巻き簾) is a small mat woven from bamboo and cotton string that is used in food preparation. Makisu are most commonly used to make a kind of rolled sushi called makizushi (巻き寿司), commonly called maki. They are also used to shape other soft foods such as tamagoyaki (a kind of omelette), and to squeeze excess liquid out of food.

A makisu is usually 25 cm × 25 cm, although they come in various sizes. Generally, there are two variations, one with thin flat bamboo strips and the other with small cylindrical strips (see attached photo). Some cooks cover the makisu with plastic film before use to reduce the cleaning effort. This is especially necessary for producing uramaki (裏巻), a kind of maki with the rice on the outside of the roll. After use, a makisu should be scrubbed to remove food particles and thoroughly air dried to avoid the growth of bacteria and fungi. Makisu are inexpensive so people can simply dispose of them after use.

Makisu is called 김발 (Kimbal) or 김밥말이 (Kimbap Mali) in Korea and is used to roll 김밥 (kimbap).
