= Rice paddle =

Japanese kitchen utensil

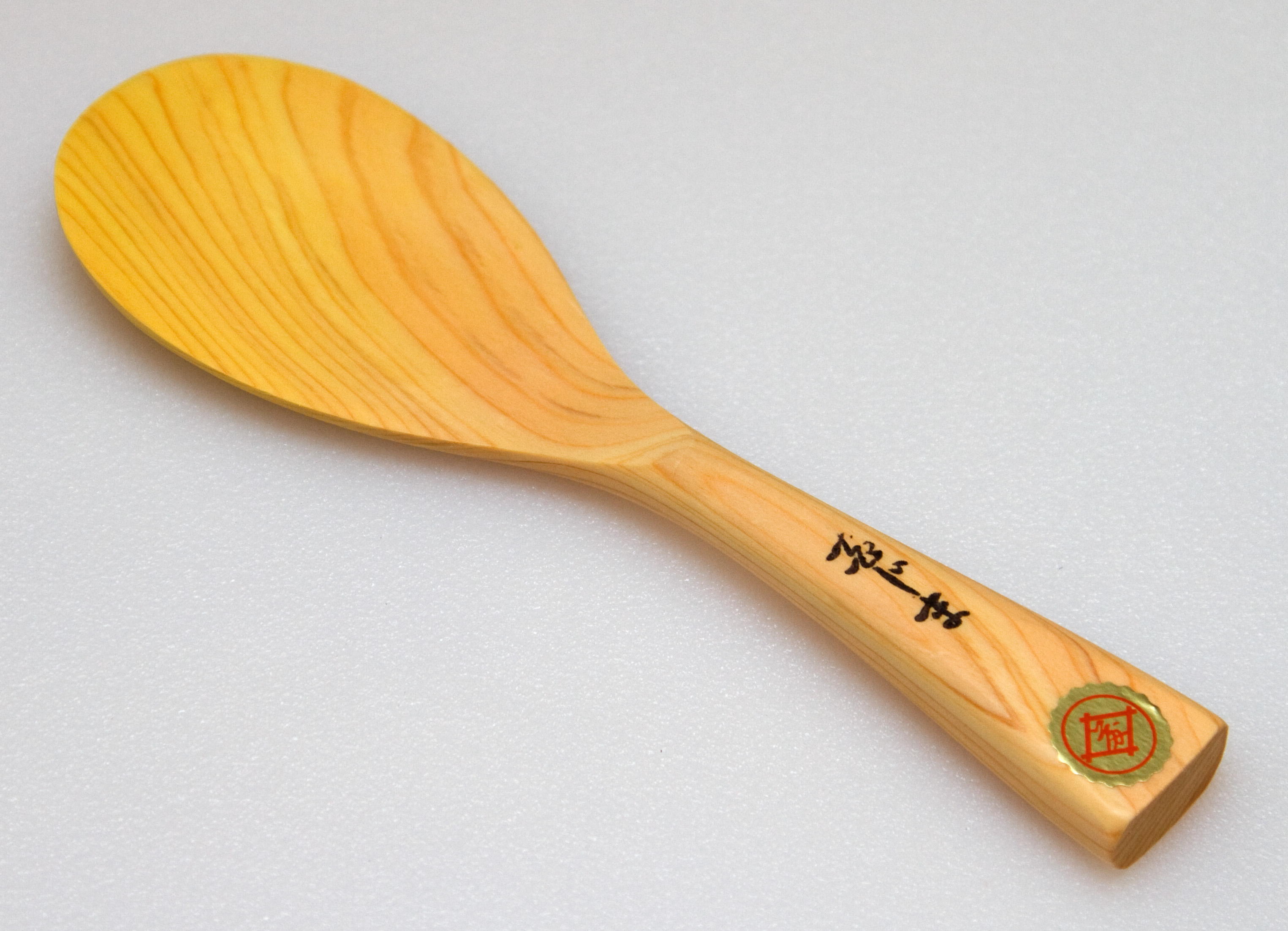
traditional Japanese rice paddle

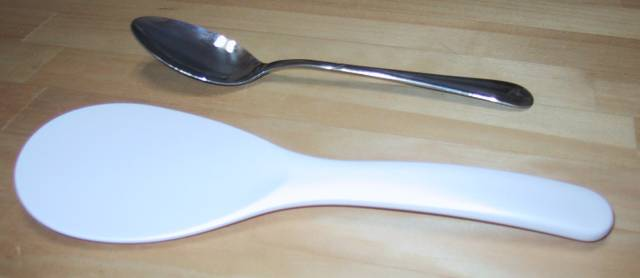
A rice paddle and a table spoon for size comparison

A rice paddle (Chinese: 饭勺, Japanese: shamoji (しゃもじ, 杓文字), Korean: 주걱; RR: Jugeok) is a large flat spoon used in East Asian cuisine. It is used to stir and to serve rice, to dip gochujang, and to mix vinegar into the rice for sushi.

Rice paddles are traditionally made from bamboo, wood, or lacquer, and nowadays often from plastic.

== History ==
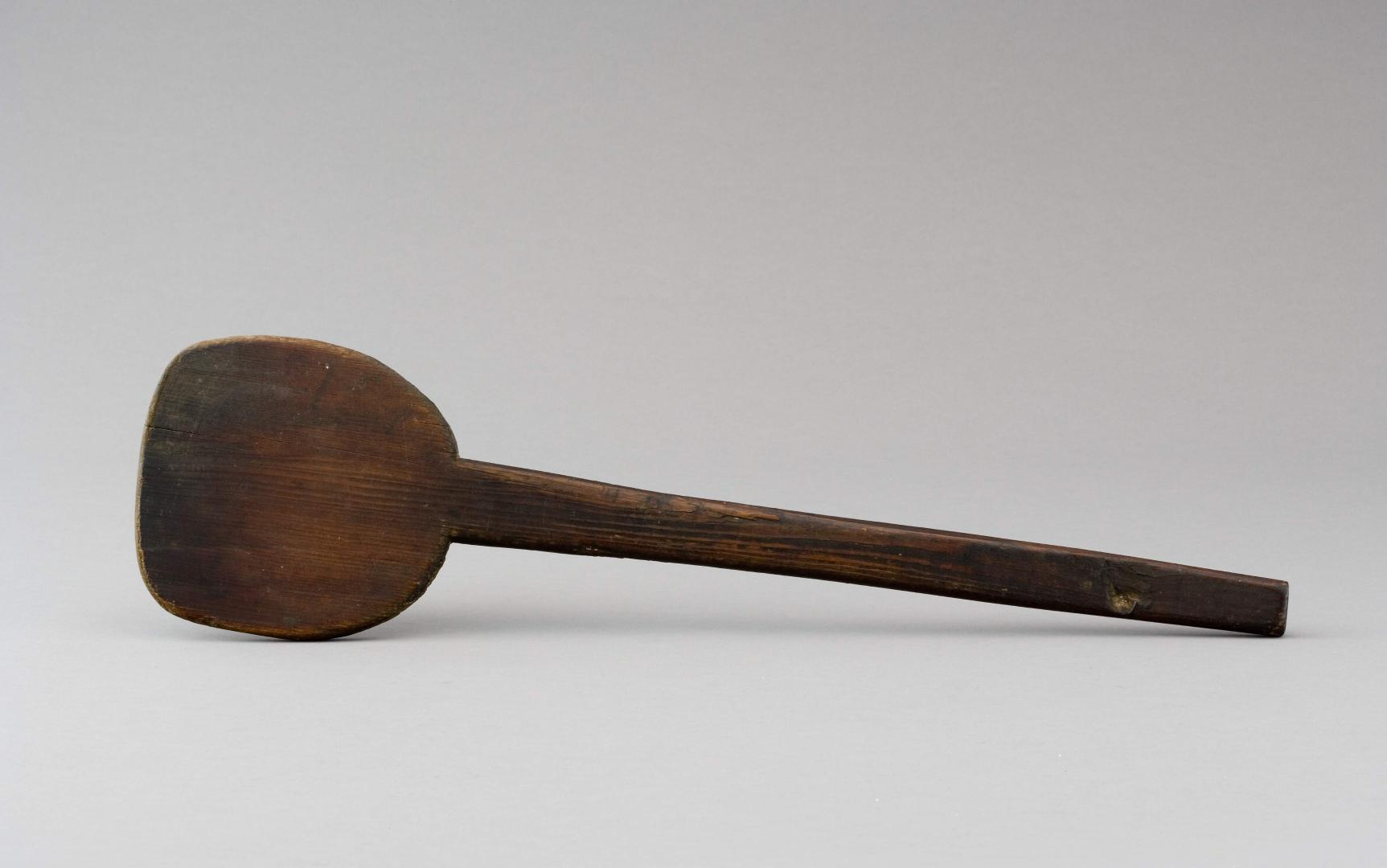
A 4th-century Korean rice paddle

The specific origin of the rice paddle is unknown, but it has been spotted in artifacts dating back to the 4th or 5th century. One such artifact originating from the Silla dynasty in Korea was excavated from the Gold Crown Tomb in Gyeongju along with a pot.

The Japanese version of the rice paddle, the 'shamoji', is said to have been first devised by a monk on Itsukushima, Hiroshima Prefecture. The word is an example of nyōbō kotoba, being derived from the first part of shakushi (杓子; "ladle"), plus the moji (文字; "character") suffix.

Modern rice cookers may include a rice paddle in the box, usually made of white plastic.

== Materials and uses ==
In Korea, rice paddles, or 'jugeok' (Korean: 주걱) were originally made out of wood in the 4th century, but began to be made out of brass during the Goryeo dynasty. Throughout the Joseon dynasty, they also began to be made from bamboo.

Modern rice paddles are typically made from plastic. When in use, they are dipped in water frequently during use to prevent rice from sticking to it. Some expensive plastic rice paddles have non-stick surfaces.

Rice paddles are also used to crush vegetables, such as garlic and cucumbers, as cleavers are used in Western cuisine.

== Culture ==
When scooping rice with a rice paddle in Korea, the rice is traditionally scooped towards the center of the bowl, as to prevent fortune from escaping the household.

In Japan, the rice paddle (shamoji) has also been a symbol of unity between the mother and wife in Japanese society. In one tradition, it was passed down from one generation to the next to symbolize the family duties that were handed down.

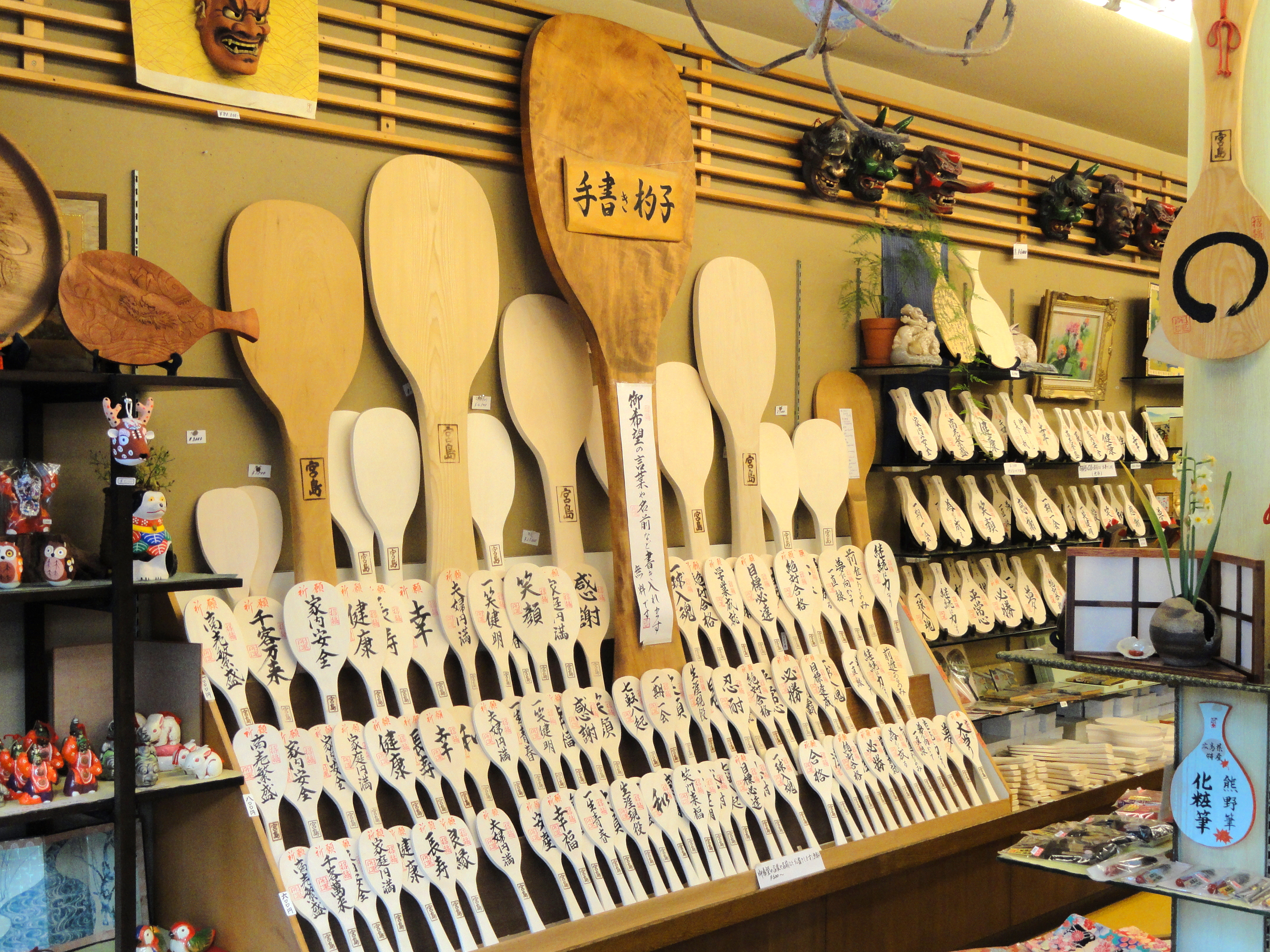
At a souvenir shop in Miyajima, where Itsukushima Shrine is located, many shamoji are sold with various wishes, such as "good health" and "prosperous business".

In Japan, the shamoji is also a good luck charm dedicated to Shinto shrines and decorated with the word "hissho" (必勝, victory) written on the part that scoops up rice when praying for victory. This is because the Japanese word "meshitoru" (飯取る), which means to scoop up rice, is pronounced the same as "meshitoru" (召し捕る), which means to capture the enemy. The custom became even more famous during the Russo-Japanese War, when soldiers dedicated many shamoji to Itsukushima Shrine to pray for Japan's victory in the war. In March 2023, Prime Minister Fumio Kishida visited Ukraine and presented President Volodymyr Zelenskyy with a shamoji with the word "hissho" (必勝, victory) written on it to pray for Ukraine's victory over Russia in the Russo-Ukrainian War.

== See also ==
- List of Japanese cooking utensils
