= Anago =

Anago Temporal range: 55–0 Ma Early Eocene to Present

Scientific classification
- Kingdom: Animalia
- Phylum: Chordata
- Class: Actinopterygii
- Division: Teleostei
- Order: Anguilliformes
- Suborder: Congroidei
- Family: Congridae

Groups included
- Heteroconger hassi (Klausewitz & Eibl-Eibesfeldt 1959); Ariosoma anago (Temminck et Schlegel, 1846); Conger cinereus (Rüppell, 1830); Conger japonicus (Bleeker, 1879); Conger myriaster (Brevoort, 1856); Gorgasia japonica (Abe, Asai & Miki 1977)

Conger eel in Japanese food

Anago (穴子, or アナゴ) is the Japanese word for saltwater eels, normally referring to ma-anago (Conger myriaster). Ma-anago are used for a seafood dish in Japan. They are often simmered (sushi) or deep-fried (tempura), compared to unagi (freshwater eels) which are usually barbecued with a sauce (kabayaki). Anago is also slightly less rich and oily than unagi. Anago has a very soft texture and sweet taste.

== Species ==
- Chin-anago (チンアナゴ) Heteroconger hassi (Klausewitz & Eibl-Eibesfeldt 1959)
- Goten-anago (ゴテンアナゴ) Ariosoma anago, Anago anago or Conger anago (Temminck et Schlegel, 1846)
- Kiri-anago (キリアナゴ) Conger cinereus (Rüppell, 1830)
- Kuro-anago (クロアナゴ) Conger japonicus (Bleeker, 1879)
- Ma-anago (マアナゴ) Conger myriaster (Brevoort, 1856)
- Shinjyu-anago (シンジュアナゴ) Gorgasia japonica (Abe, Asai & Miki 1977)

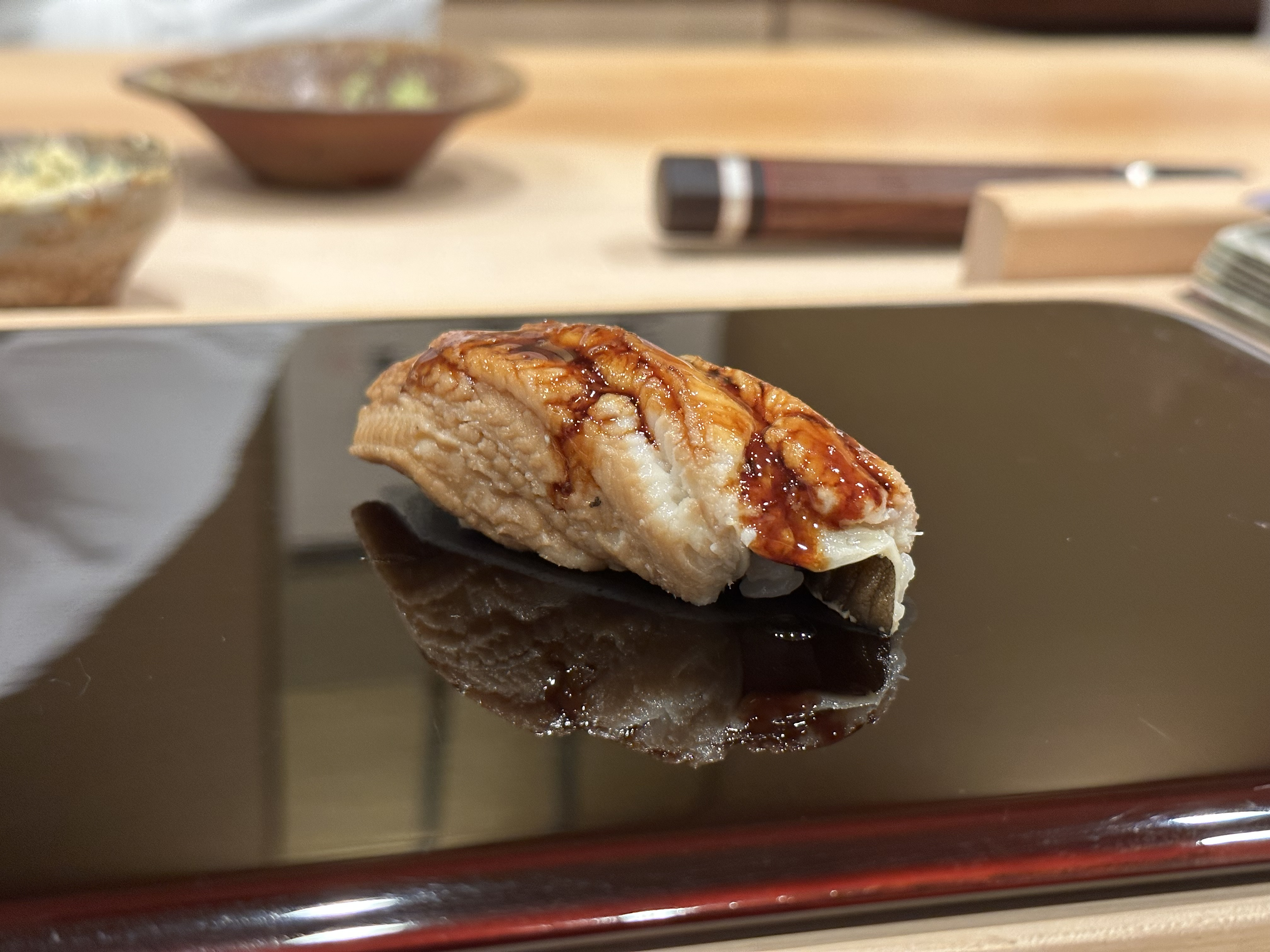
Anago sushi

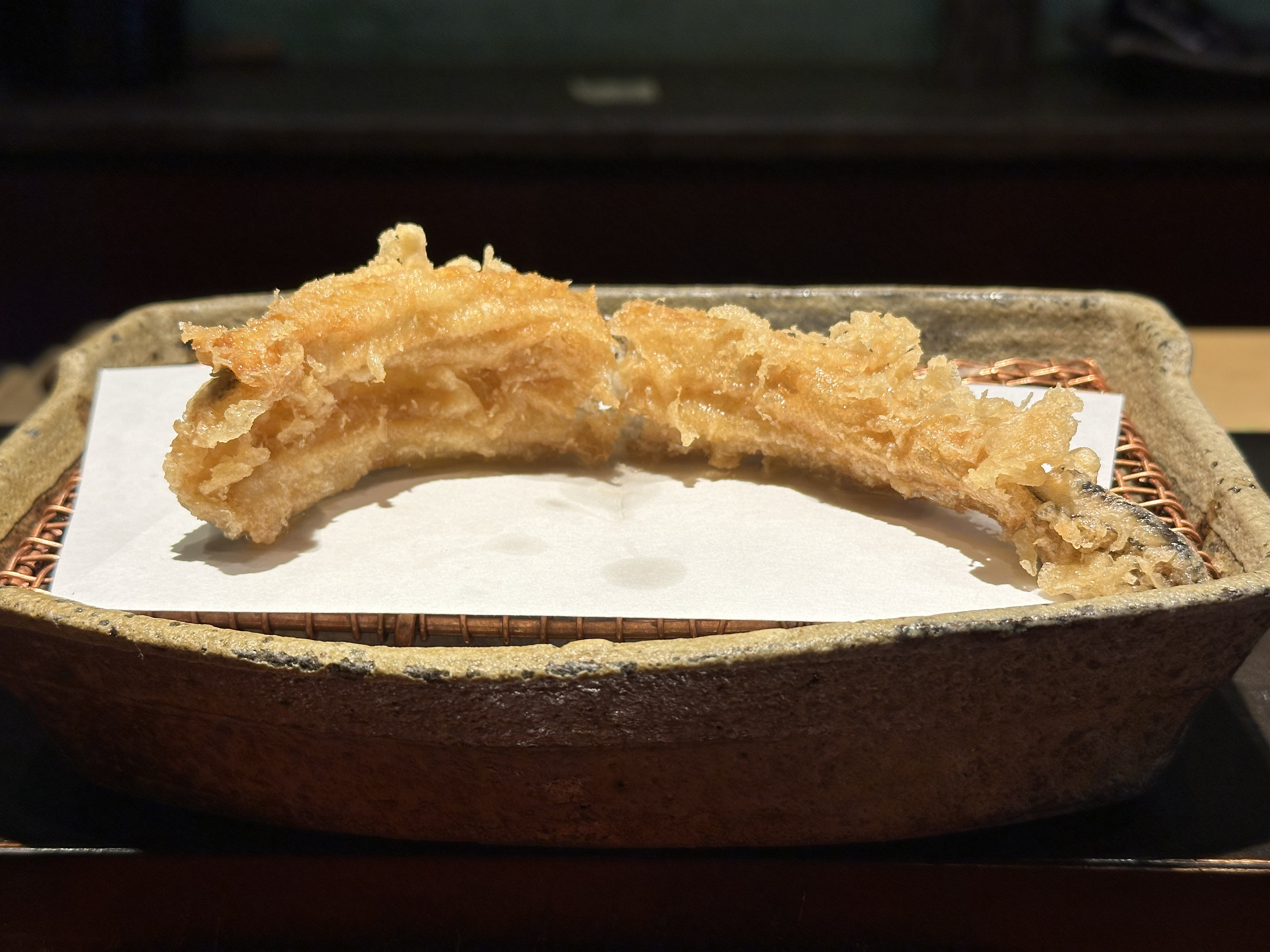
Anago tempura
