= List of sushi and sashimi ingredients =

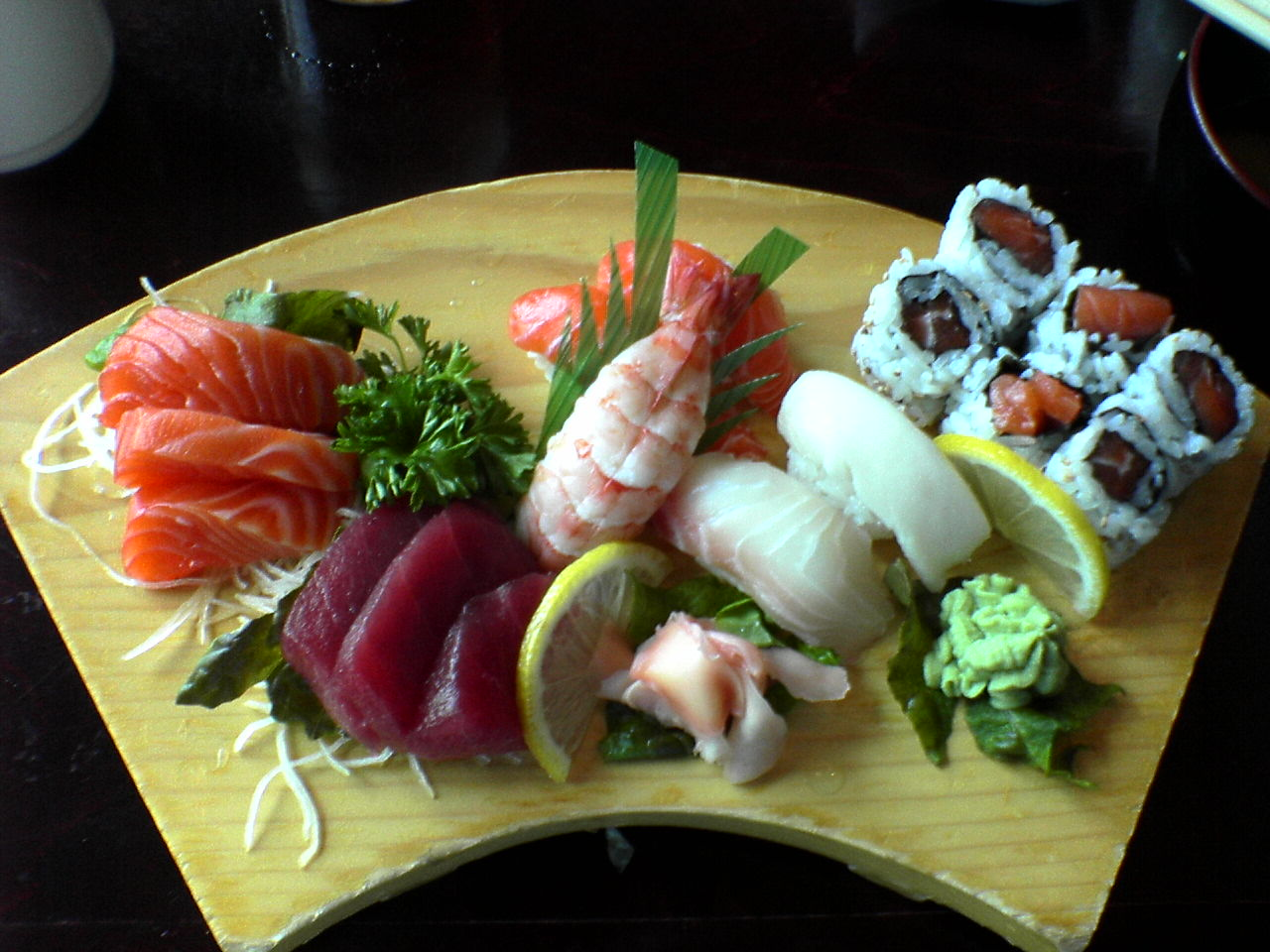
Sushi plate (盛り合わせ) with sashimi to the left and a Western-style inside-out roll (rice outside) to the right

There are many sushi and sashimi ingredients, some of which are traditional and others contemporary.

== Sushi styles ==
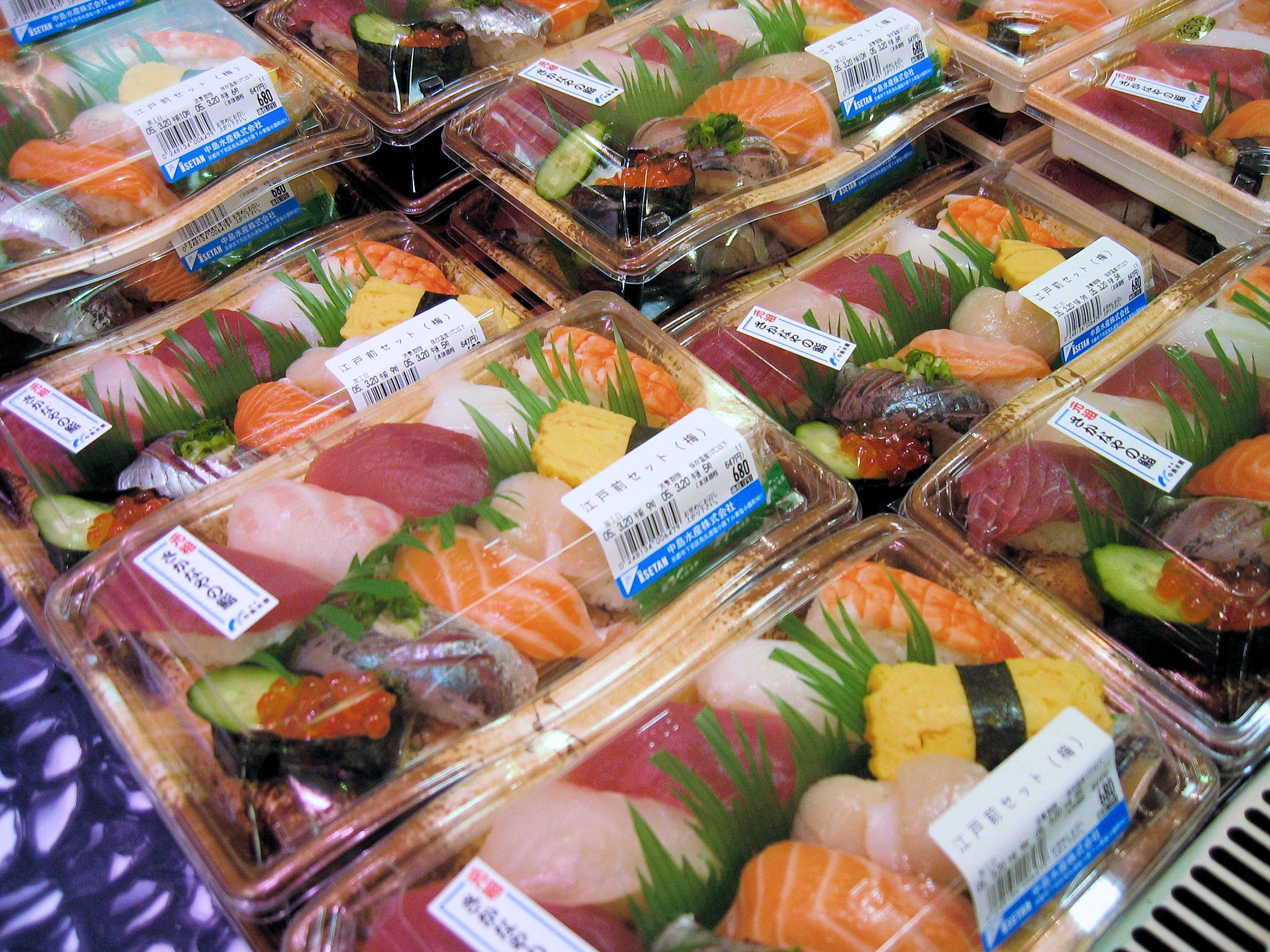
Packaged nigirizushi for sale at a Tokyo supermarket

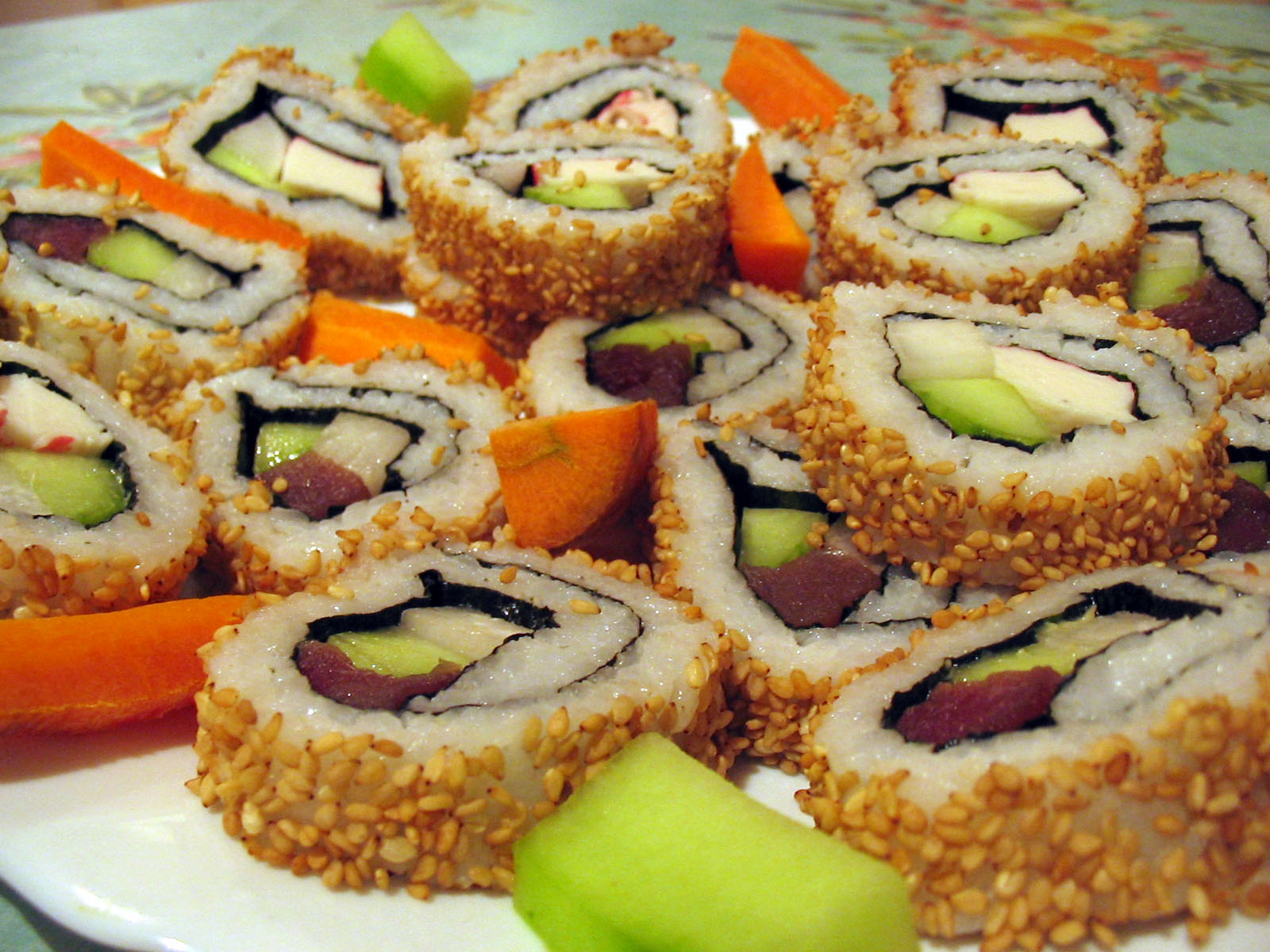
California roll is a contemporary-style maki-zushi.

- Chirashi-zushi (ちらし寿司, scattered sushi) is a bowl of sushi rice topped with a variety of raw fish and vegetables/garnishes (also refers to barazushi)
- Inari-zushi (稲荷寿司, fried tofu pouch) is a type of sushi served in a seasoned and fried pouch made of tofu and filled with sushi rice.
- Maki-zushi (巻き寿司, rolled sushi) consists of rice and other ingredients rolled together with a sheet of nori.
  - Chu maki (中巻き, medium roll) is a medium-sized rolled maki sushi usually containing several ingredients
  - Futo maki (太巻き, large or fat roll) is a thick rolled maki sushi containing multiple ingredients
  - Gunkan maki (軍艦巻, battleship roll) is a type of sushi consisting of a rice ball wrapped in a sheet of nori which extends in a cylinder upward to hold a loose topping such as fish eggs
  - Hoso maki (細巻き, thin roll) is thinly rolled maki sushi with only one ingredient
  - Kazari maki (飾り巻き寿司, flower or decorative roll) is a type of sushi designed frequently with colored rice into simple or complex shapes.
  - Temaki (手巻き, hand roll) is a cone-shaped maki sushi
- Nigiri sushi (握り寿司, hand-formed sushi) consists of an oval-shaped ball of rice topped with a slice of another item
- Oshi sushi (押し寿司, "pressed sushi"), also known as hako-zushi (箱寿司, "box sushi"), is formed by molding the rice and toppings in a rectangular box, then slicing into blocks.
- Uramaki (うらまき, inside-out roll) is a contemporary style of Maki-zushi that is described as a roll that is inside out—with the rice on the outside—and has an outer layer of tobiko or sesame seeds.

== Wrappings ==
- Nori (海苔): dried seaweed (often used to wrap or belt makizushi or gunkan)
- Rice paper
- Salmon skin
- Thinly sliced sheets of cucumber
- Usuyaki-tamago: thinly cooked sweet omelette or custard
- Yuba: "tofu skin" or "soybean skin", a thin film derived from soybeans

== Eggs ==
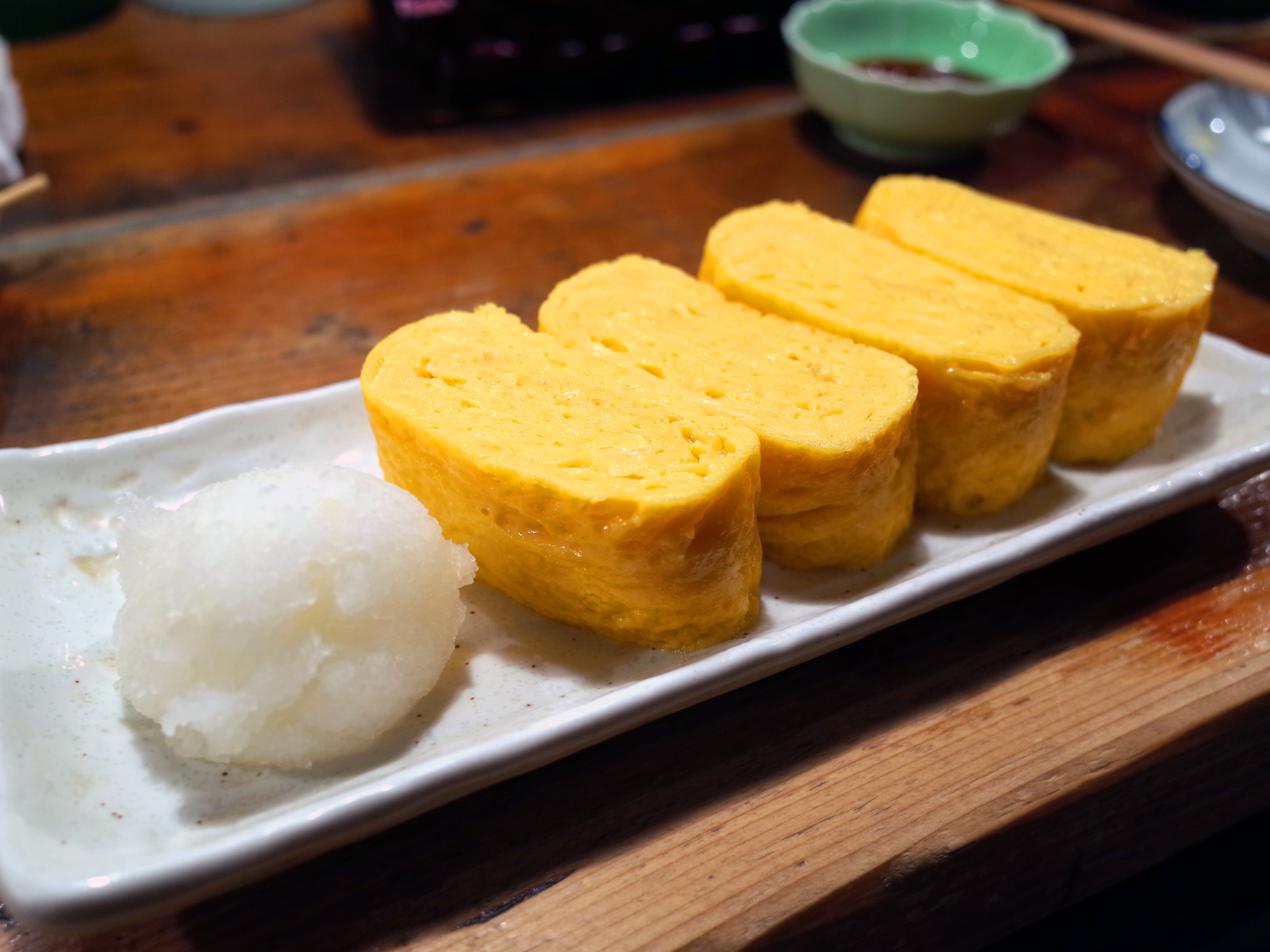
Tamagoyaki, also referred to as tamago

- Tamago (卵, 玉子): sweet egg omelette or custard, sometimes mixed with minced fish
- Quail eggs (raw or cooked)

== Meats ==
- Basashi/sakura niku (馬刺し/桜肉): Raw horse, nicknamed for its bright pink color
- Gyusashi (牛刺し): Raw beef
- Shikasashi (鹿刺し): Raw venison
- Torisashi (鳥刺し): Raw chicken

== Seafood ==
All seafoods in this list are served raw unless otherwise specified.

=== Finfish ===
The list below does not follow biological classification.

- Ainame (アイナメ): fat greenling
- Aji (鯵): Japanese jack mackerel
- Akami (赤身): red meat fish
- Akamutsu (アカムツ): blackthroat seaperch
- Aka-yagara (赤矢柄): red cornetfish
- Amadai (あまだい): tilefish
- Anago (穴子): saltwater eel, conger eel
- Ankimo (鮟肝): monkfish liver (cooked)
- Ayu (鮎): sweetfish (raw or grilled)
- Buri (鰤): adult yellowtail (cooked or raw)
  - Hamachi (魬, はまち): young (35–60 cm) yellowtail

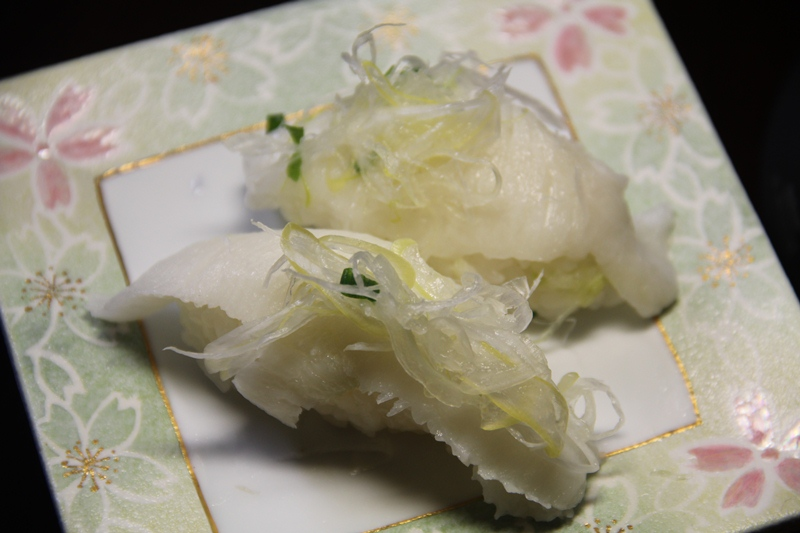
Engawa (meat close to the fin of a flounder) nigirizushi

- Dojo (ドジョウ): Japanese loach
- Ei (エイ): skate
- Engawa (縁側): often referred as 'fluke fin', the chewy part of fluke, a flatfish
- Fugu (河豚): puffer fish
- Funa (フナ): crucian carp
- Gindara (銀鱈): sablefish
- Hamo (鱧, はも): daggertooth pike conger, a variety of eel, less popular than unagi and anago, and known for its fatty texture
- Hata (ハタ): grouper
- Hatahata (鰰): sandfish
- Hikari-mono (光り物): blue-backed fish, various kinds of "shiny" (silvery scales) fish
- Hiramasa (平政, 平柾): yellowtail amberjack (Seriola lalandi)
- Hirame (平目, 鮃): fluke, a type of flounder
- Hokke (ホッケ): Okhotsk atka mackerel
- Hoshigarei (干鰈): spotted halibut
- Inada (鰍): very young yellowtail
- Isake (いさけ): trumpeter
- Isaki (伊佐木, いさき): striped pigfish
- Ishigarei (石鰈): stone flounder
- Iwana (イワナ): charr
- Iwashi (鰯): sardine
- Kajiki (梶木, 舵木, 旗魚): swordfish
  - Makajiki (真梶木): blue marlin
  - Mekajiki (目梶木): swordfish
- Kanpachi (間八): greater amberjack, Seriola dumerili
- Karei (鰈): flatfish
- Katsuo (鰹, かつお): skipjack tuna
- Kawahagi (皮剥ぎ): Filefish
- Kibinago (黍魚子): banded blue sprat, or silver-stripe round herring
- Kisu (鱚): sillago
- Kochi (こち): flathead
- Kohada (小鰭): Japanese gizzard shad

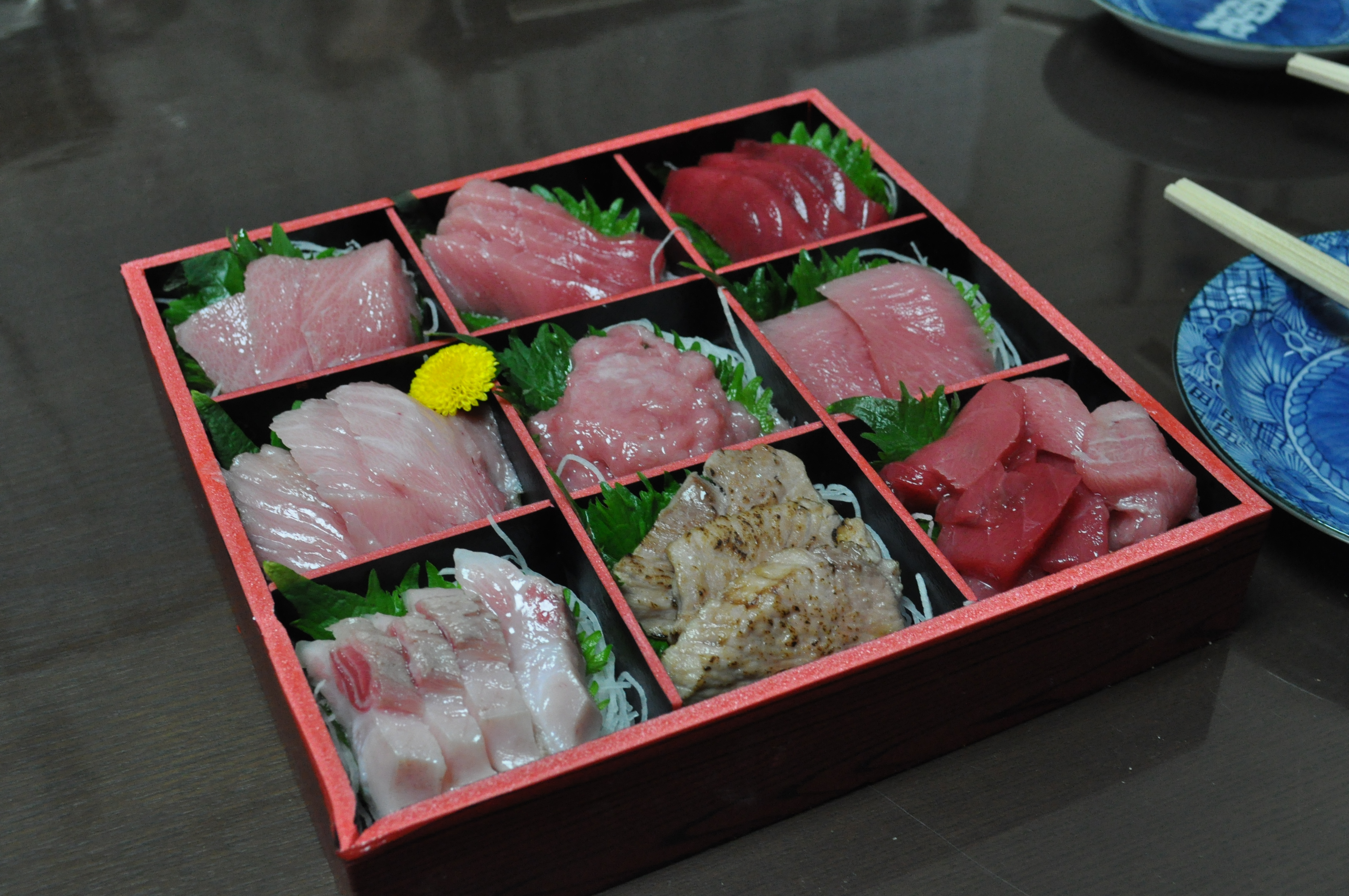
Various cuts of tuna including akami, ōtoro and chūtoro prepared as sashimi

  - Shinko (新子): very young gizzard shad
  - Konoshiro (鰶): fully matured gizzard shad
- Kue (クエ): longtooth grouper
- Madai (まだい): red sea bream
- Maguro (鮪): Thunnus (a genus of tuna)
  - Chūtoro (中とろ): medium-fat bluefin tuna belly
  - Kuro (maguro) (くろまぐろ): bluefin tuna, the fish itself
  - Kihada (maguro) (木肌鮪, 黄肌鮪, きはだ): yellowfin tuna
  - Mebachi (maguro) (めばちまぐろ): bigeye tuna, the most widely distributed fish in Japan
  - Meji (maguro) (メジ鮪): young Pacific bluefin tuna
  - Ōtoro (大とろ): fattiest portion of bluefin tuna belly
  - Shiro maguro (白鮪), Binnaga/Bincho (鬢長): albacore or "white" tuna
  - Toro (とろ): fatty bluefin tuna belly
- Makogarei (まこがれい): marbled flounder
- Mamakari (飯借): sprat
- Matou-dai (まとう-だい): John Dory
- Masu (鱒): Trout
- Mejina (メジナ): Girella
- Nijimasu (虹鱒): Rainbow trout
- Nishin (ニシン): Herring
- Noresore (のれそれ): baby anago
- Ohyou (大鮃): halibut
- Okoze (虎魚): Okoze stonefish
- Saba (鯖): chub mackerel or blue mackerel Served raw or marinated
- Sake, Shake (鮭): Salmon
- Sanma (秋刀魚): Pacific saury (autumn) or mackerel pike
- Same (サメ): Shark
- Sawara (鰆): Spanish mackerel
- Sayori (針魚, 鱵): halfbeak (springtime)
- Shima-aji (しま鯵): white trevally
- Shirauo (しらうお): whitebait (Springtime)
- Shiromi (白身) seasonal "white meat" fish
- Suzuki (鱸): sea bass
  - Seigo (鮬): young (1-2 y.o.) sea bass
- Tachiuo (タチウオ): beltfish

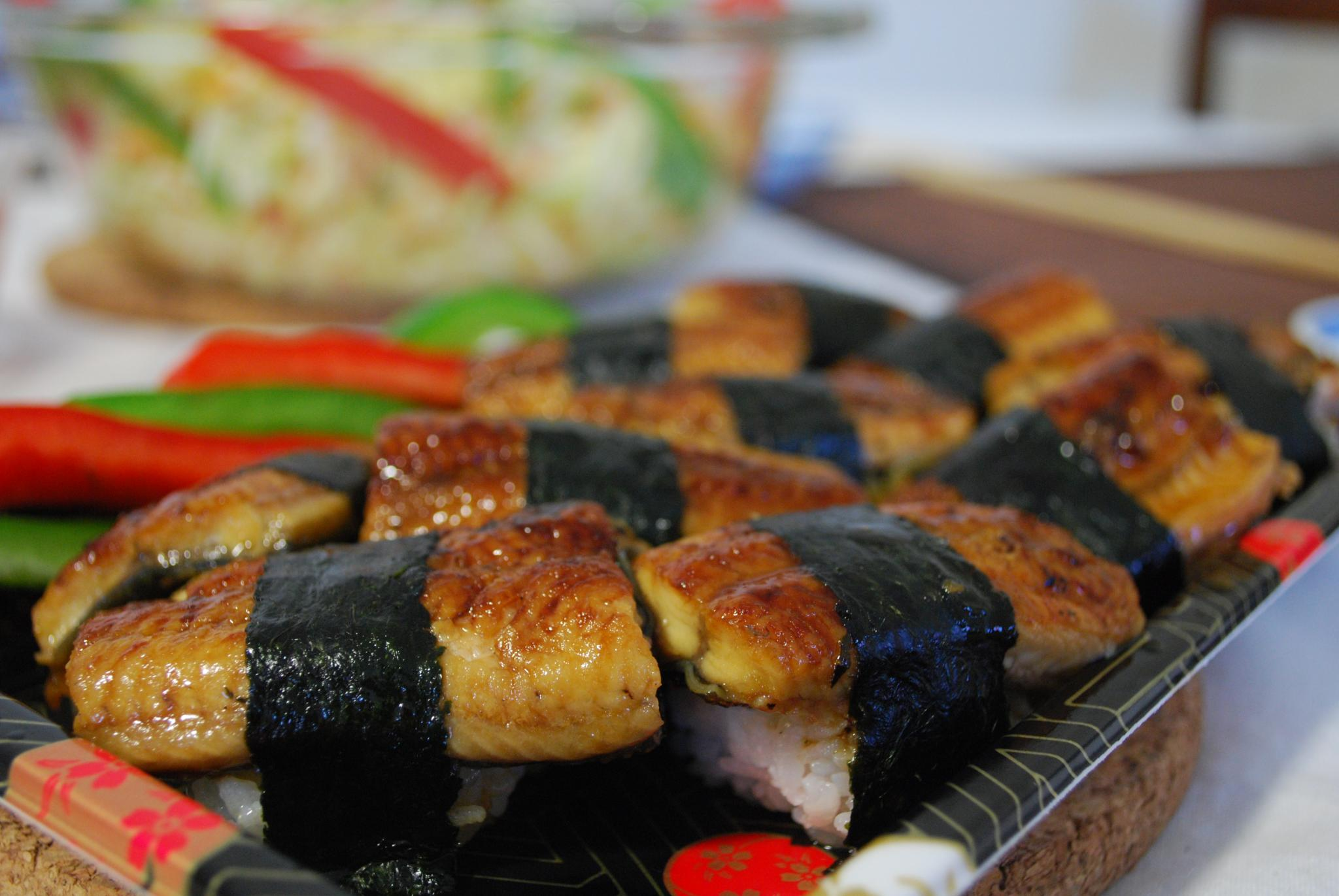
Unagi nigiri sushi

- Tai (鯛): seabream snapper
  - Madai (真鯛): red sea bream
  - Kasugo (春子鯛): young sea bream
  - Kurodai (黒鯛): snapper
  - Ibodai (疣鯛): Japanese butterfish
  - Kinmedai (金目鯛): splendid alfonsino
- Tara (鱈): Cod
- Unagi (鰻): freshwater eel, often broiled (grilled) with a sweet sauce. The preparation of unagi is referred to as kabayaki.

=== Inkfish ===
- Aori ika (あおりいか): Bigfin reef squid
- Hotaru ika (ホタルイカ): Firefly squid
- Ika (烏賊, いか): Cuttlefish or squid, served raw or cooked
- Sumi ika (墨, すみいか): Japanese spineless cuttlefish
- Tako (蛸, たこ): Octopus
- Yari ika (ヤリイカ): Spear squid

=== Others ===
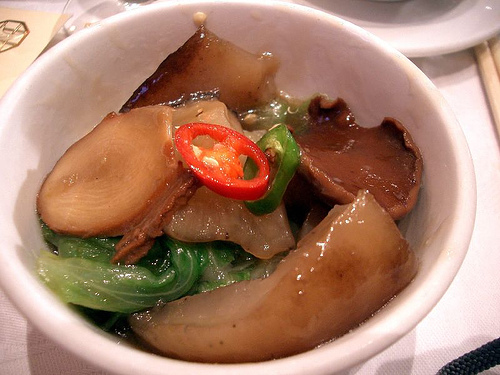
Sea cucumber (Namako)

- Hoya (海鞘, ホヤ): Sea pineapple, an Ascidian
- Kamesashi (かめさし): Sea turtle sashimi
- Kurage (水母, 海月): Jellyfish
- Kujira (鯨, くじら, クジラ): Whale
- Namako (海鼠, なまこ): Sea cucumber
- Shiokara (塩辛): Seasoned, salted entrails; frequently squid
- Hitode (ヒトデ): Starfish
- Uni: (雲丹, 海胆) gonad of sea urchin; may come in different colors

=== Roe ===
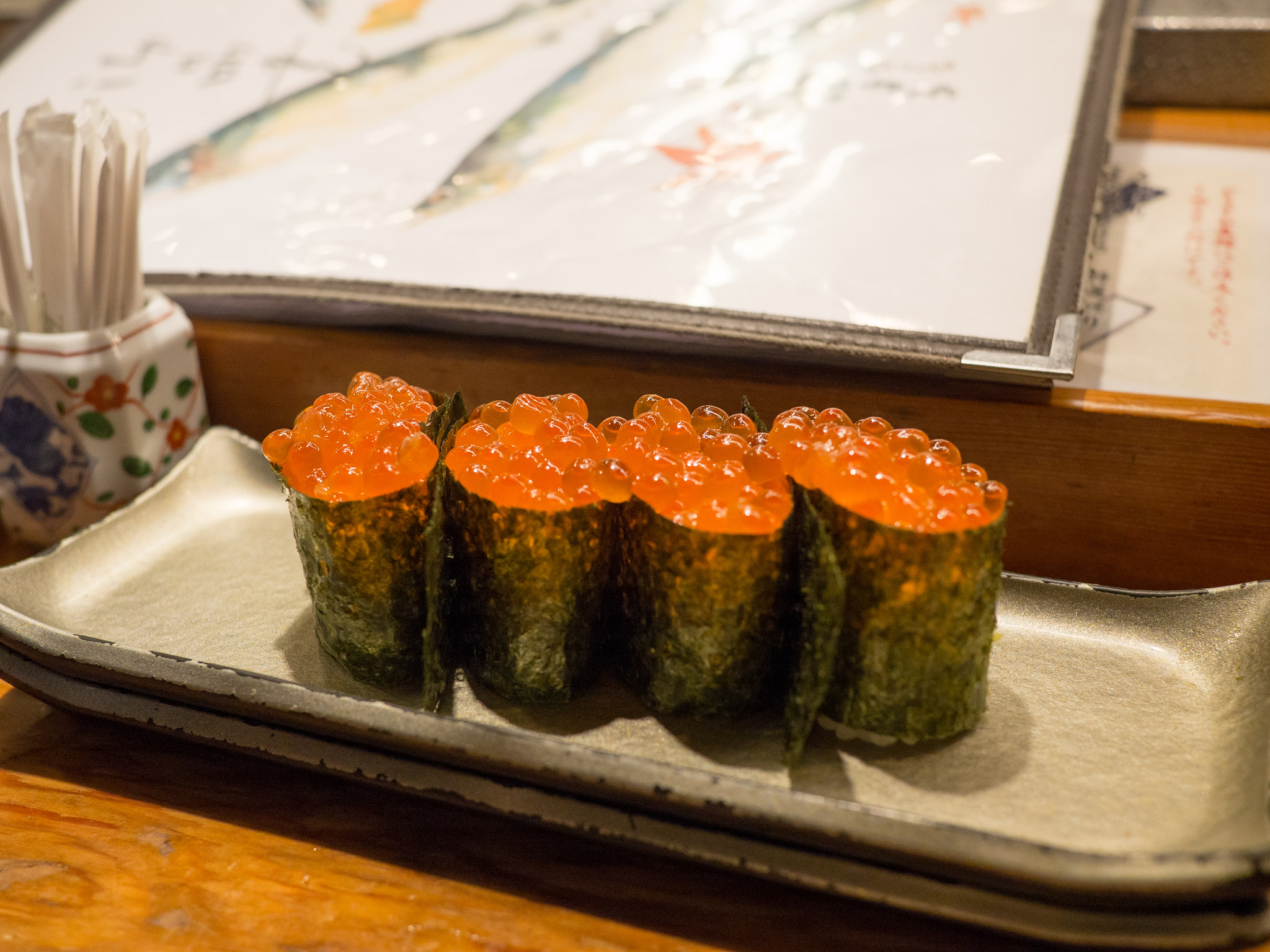
Ikura gunkan maki sushi

Roe is a mass of fish eggs:

- Caviar (キャビア): roe of sturgeon
- Ikura (イクラ): Salmon roe
- Sujiko (筋子): Salmon roe (still in the sac)
- Kazunoko (数の子, 鯑): Herring roe
- Masago (まさご): Smelt roe
- Mentaiko (明太子): Pollock roe seasoned to have a spicy flavor

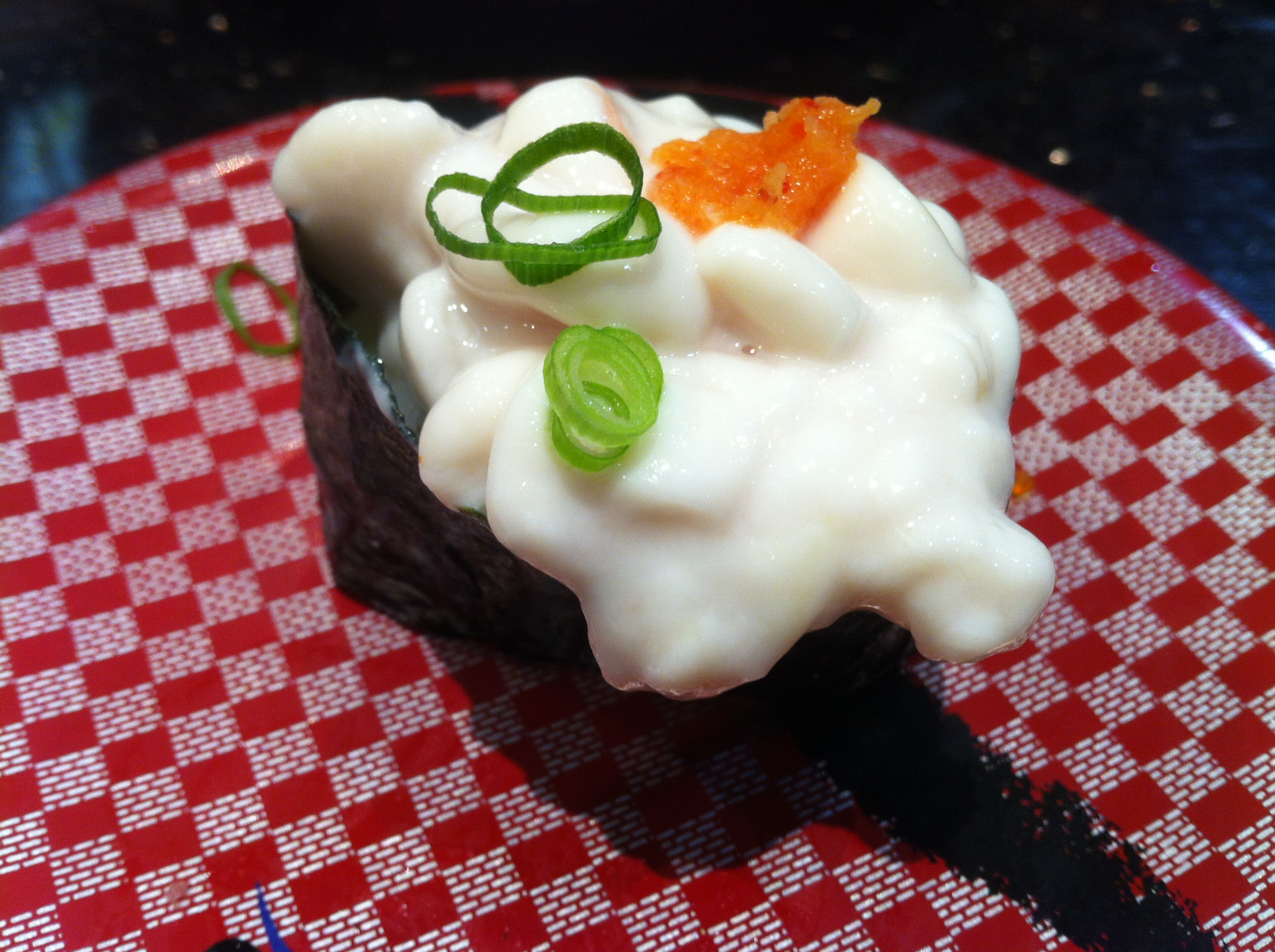
Shirako (cod sperm) gunkanmaki-zushi

- Shirako (白子): Milt
- Tarako (たらこ, 鱈子): Alaska pollock roe
- Tobiko (飛子): roe of Flying fish

=== Seaweed ===
- Kombu (昆布): Kelp, many preparations
- Wakame (若布): Edible seaweed, sea mustard

=== Shellfish ===
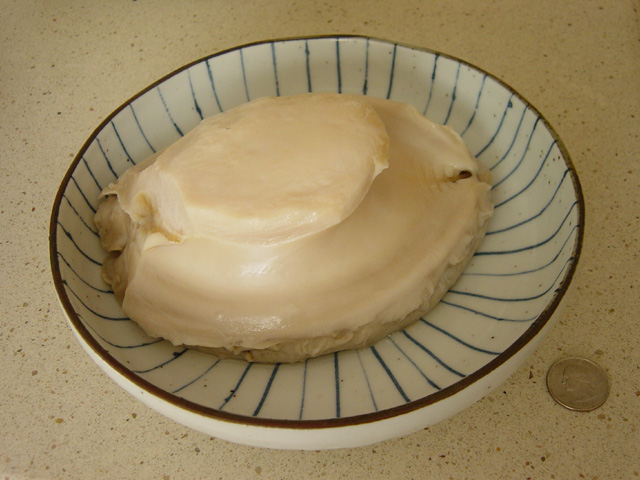
Raw abalone meat

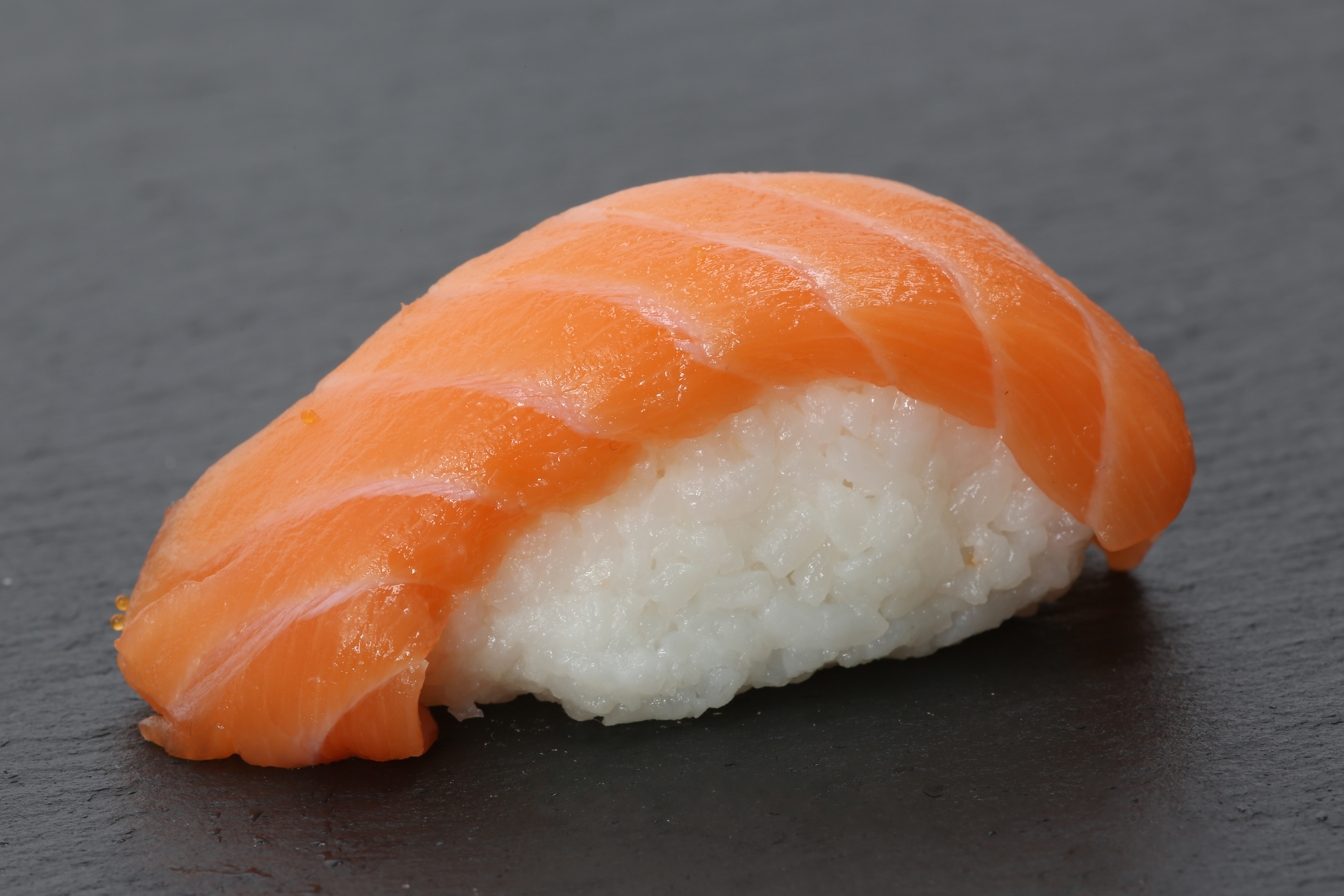
Salmon nigiri

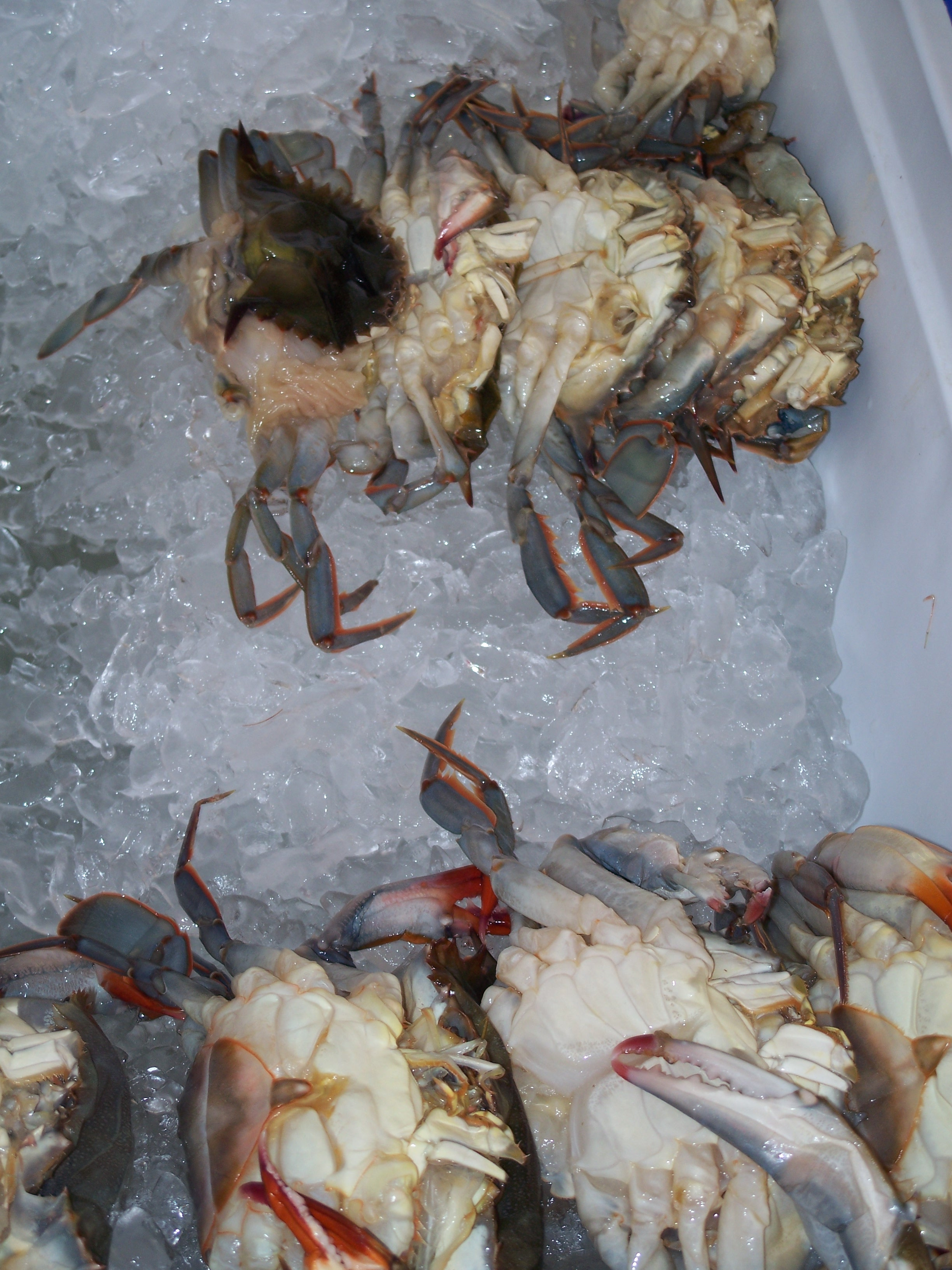
Soft-shell crab on ice

- Akagai (赤貝): Ark shell
- Ama-ebi (甘海老): raw pink shrimp Pandalus borealis
- Aoyagi (青柳): Trough shell
- Asari (あさり): Japanese carpet shell
- Awabi (鮑): Abalone
- Botan-ebi (ぼたんえび): Botan shrimp
- Dungeness crab
- Ebi (海老): boiled or raw shrimp
- Hamaguri (蛤): Clam, Meretrix lusoria
- Himejako (ヒメジャコ): Giant clam
- Himo (紐): "fringe" around an Akagai
- Hokkigai, Hokki (ホッキ貝, 北寄貝): Surf clam
- Hotategai, Hotate (帆立貝, 海扇): Scallop
- Ise-ebi (伊勢海老): a spiny lobster, Panulirus japonicus
- Kaibashira (貝柱), Hashira (柱): valve muscles of scallop or shellfish
- Kani (蟹): Crab, also refers to imitation crab
- Kani-miso (カニミソ): Crab offal paste
- Kaki (カキ,牡蠣): Oyster
- Kegani (ケガニ): hairy crab
- Kuruma-ebi (車海老): Prawn species Marsupenaeus japonicus
- Makigai (マキガイ): Conch
- Mategai (マテ貝): Razor clam
- Matsubagani (松葉蟹): Champagne crab or regionally, Snow crab
- Mirugai (海松貝): Geoduck clam
- Sazae (栄螺, さざえ): Horned turban shell
- Shako (蝦蛄): Mantis shrimp or "Squilla"
- Shiba ebi (芝海老): Grey prawn
- Shima ebi (しまえび): Morotoge shrimp
- Soft-shell crab
- Tarabagani (鱈場蟹): King crab
- Tairagai (タイラギ): Pen-shell clam
- Torigai (鳥貝): Cockle
- Tsubugai (螺貝, ツブガイ): Whelk (Neptunea, Buccinum, Babylonia japonica)
- Zuwaigani (ズワイガニ/津和井蟹/松葉蟹), also regionally marketed as matsubagani: Snow crab

== Vegetables and fruit ==
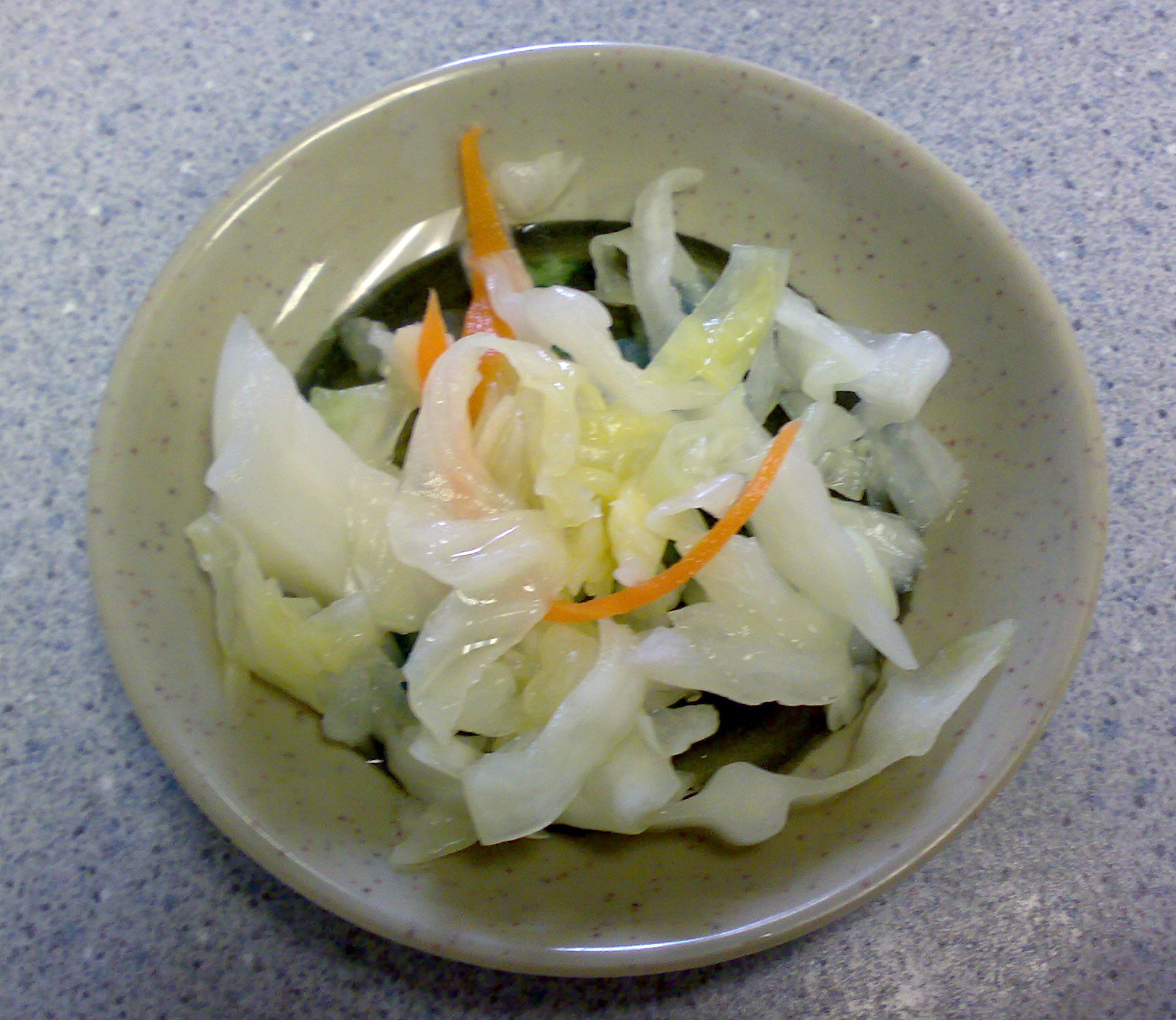
A dish of tsukemono

- Asparagus (アスパラガス)
- Avocado (アボカド)
- Carrot (ニンジン): a julienne of carrot
- Cucumber (キュウリ): a julienne of cucumber
- Eggplant (ナス): served in small slices, coated with oil
- Ginger (しょうが): most often used is pickled ginger: beni shōga and gari
- Gobō (牛蒡): Burdock root
- Kaiware (かいわれ大根): Daikon radish sprouts
- Kanpyō (乾瓢, 干瓢): dried gourd
- Kappamaki (河童巻き): a makizushi made of cucumber and named after the Japanese water spirit who loves cucumber (Kappa)
- Konnyaku (蒟蒻): Cake made from the corm of the Konjac plant
- Nattō (納豆): fermented soybeans
- Negi (ネギ): Japanese bunching onion
- Oshinko (漬物): Takuan (pickled daikon) or other pickled vegetable
- Shiitake (シイタケ): dried shiitake mushrooms, served roasted or simmered
- Takuan (沢庵漬け): pickled daikon radish
- Tofu (豆腐): Soybean curd
- Tsukemono (漬物): various pickled vegetables
- Umeboshi (梅干し): pickled plum
- Wasabi (山葵, わさび): paste of wasabi root
- Yam (サツマイモ):
- Yuba (ゆば): Tofu skin

== See also ==
- List of condiments
- List of Japanese condiments
- List of Japanese cooking utensils
- List of Japanese dishes
