= Conger philippinus =

Conservation status
- Data Deficient (IUCN 3.1)

Scientific classification
- Kingdom: Animalia
- Phylum: Chordata
- Class: Actinopterygii
- Order: Anguilliformes
- Family: Congridae
- Genus: Conger
- Species: C. philippinus

Binomial name
- Conger philippinus Kanazawa, 1958

Species of fish

Conger philippinus is an eel in the family Congridae (conger/garden eels). It was described by Robert H. Kanazawa in 1958. It is a tropical, marine eel which is known from the western central Pacific Ocean.
