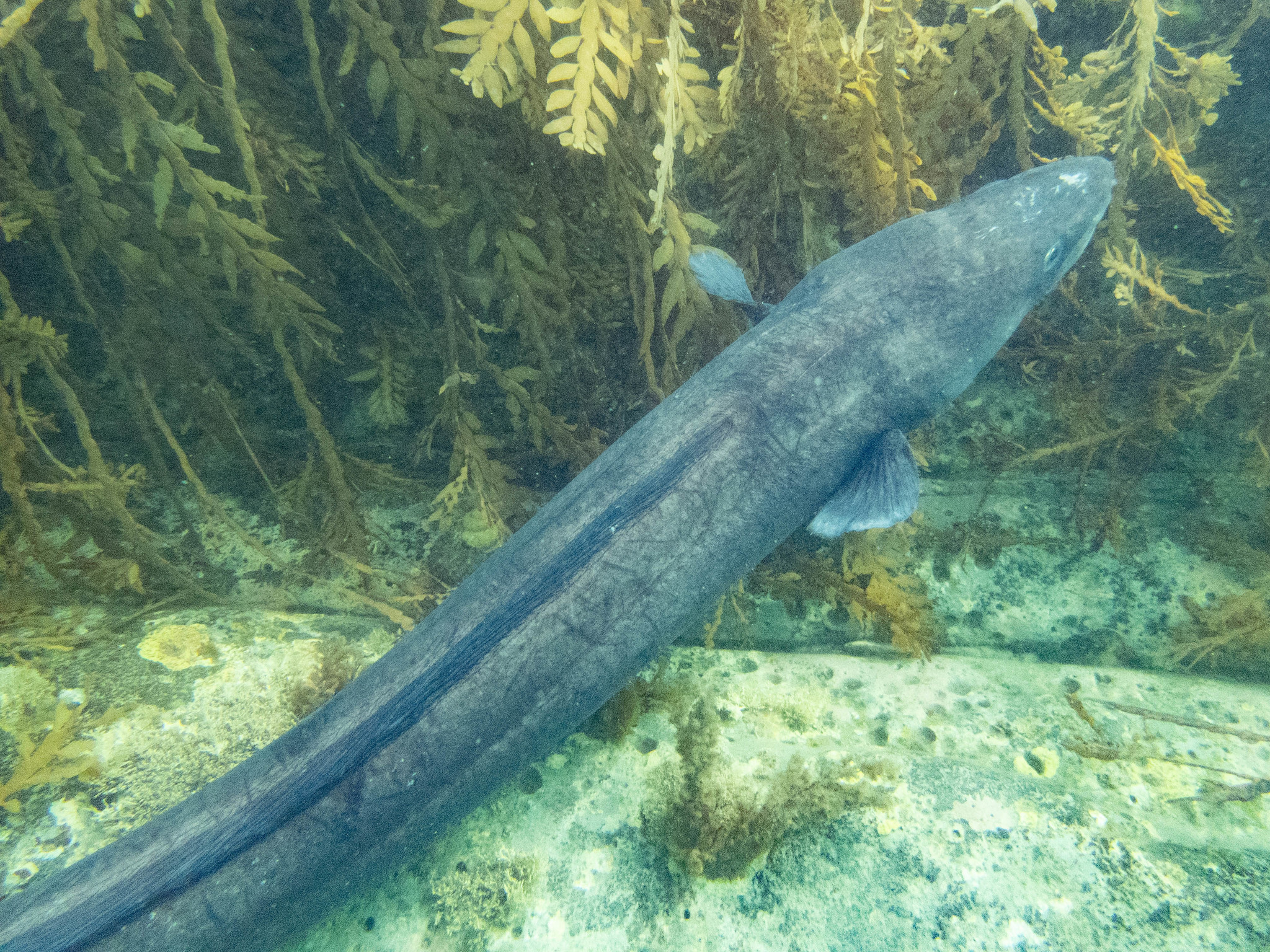

Conservation status
- Least Concern (IUCN 3.1)

Scientific classification
- Kingdom: Animalia
- Phylum: Chordata
- Class: Actinopterygii
- Order: Anguilliformes
- Family: Congridae
- Genus: Conger
- Species: C. verreauxi

Binomial name
- Conger verreauxi Kaup, 1856

= Southern conger =

Species of fish

The southern conger (Conger verreauxi) is a conger of the family Congridae, found in the eastern Indian Ocean and south-western Pacific Ocean, including southern Australia and New Zealand, at depths down to 100 m in broken rocky reef areas. Length is up to 2 m and weight may be up to 5 kg.

The fish is named in honor of Kaup's friend Julius "Jules" Verreaux (1807-1873), who was a botanist, an ornithologist and a trader in natural history specimens, and who collected the type specimen in Australia.
