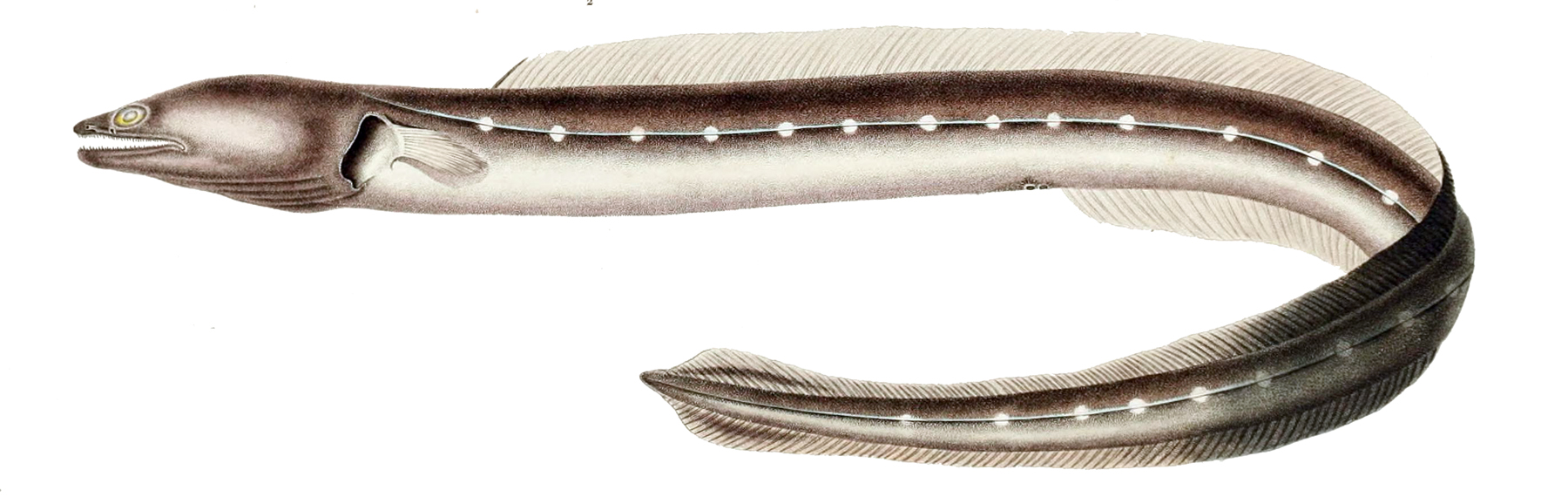
- Illustration of Argentine conger

Conservation status
- Least Concern (IUCN 3.1)

Scientific classification
- Kingdom: Animalia
- Phylum: Chordata
- Class: Actinopterygii
- Order: Anguilliformes
- Family: Congridae
- Genus: Conger
- Species: C. orbignianus

Binomial name
- Conger orbignianus Valenciennes, 1837

Synonyms
- Conger multidens Castelnau, 1855; Conger orbignyanus Valenciennes, 1837; Leptocephalus orbignyanus (Valenciennes, 1837)

= Argentine conger =

Species of fish

The Argentine conger (Conger orbignianus) is a conger eel of the class Actinopterygii. It is found in its adult form on the South American coast of the Atlantic Ocean in Brazil, Uruguay, and Argentina, though its larval form has been discovered in the Gulf of Guinea on Africa's Atlantic coast.

== Taxonomy ==
The Argentine conger was first described by Achille Valenciennes in 1837. It has also been described under the synonyms Conger multidens, Conger orbignyanus, and Leptocephalus orbignyanus. It is classified in the Congridae family (conger eels) of the order Anguilliformes (eels), in the class Actinopterygii.

== Ecology ==
The Argentine conger is a demersal fish found in the western Atlantic Ocean between Rio de Janeiro, Brazil and the San Jorge Gulf of Argentina. In the Eastern Atlantic it only been found in its larval form in the southern Gulf of Guinea from Annobón, Equatorial Guinea to Mossamedes, Angola. It preys on fishes, shrimps, crabs, and mollusks.

The species is assessed as a least-concern species on the IUCN Red List. It lives in the neritic zone, at least 10 metres deep with an unknown maximum depth. It has been accidentally taken by fishers with trawling nets.

== Description and life cycle ==
The Argentine conger is a marine eel with small, fan-shaped pectoral fins. It reaches up to 112 centimetres (3 ft 8 in) in length. Female specimens gathered from Brazilian waters displayed likely early stages of semelparity, or death after a single instance of reproduction, as the ovaries occupied the specimens' entire abdominal cavities and the bodies had begun to degrade.
