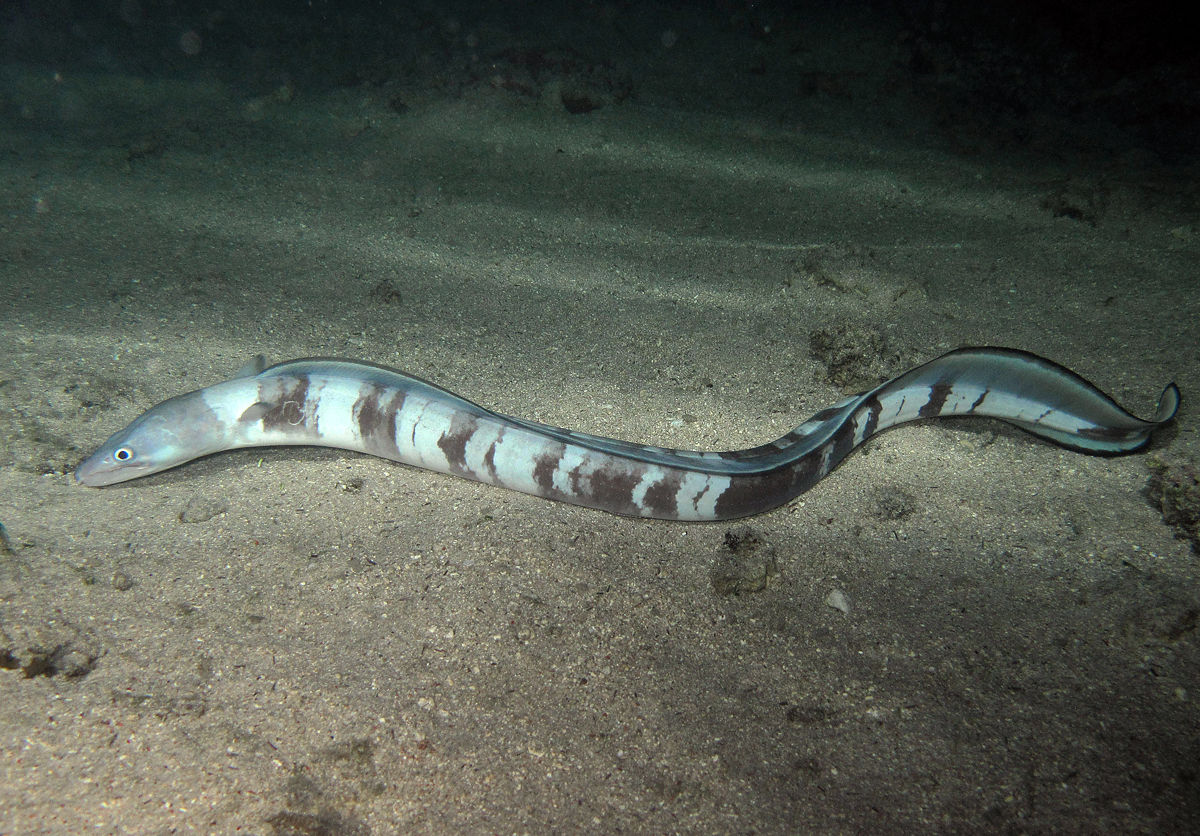

Conservation status
- Least Concern (IUCN 3.1)

Scientific classification
- Kingdom: Animalia
- Phylum: Chordata
- Class: Actinopterygii
- Order: Anguilliformes
- Family: Congridae
- Genus: Conger
- Species: C. cinereus

Binomial name
- Conger cinereus Rüppell, 1830

Synonyms
- Conger altipinnis Kaup, 1856; Conger cinereus cinereus Rüppell, 1830; Conger cinereus marginatus Valenciennes, 1850; Conger flavipinnatus Bennett, 1832; Conger marginatus Valenciennes, 1850

= Longfin African conger =

Species of fish

The longfin African conger (Conger cinereus) is an eel of the family Congridae known by several common names, including the blacklip conger, moustache conger, and ashen conger. Its range covers much of the Indo-West Pacific, from the Red Sea and East Africa, to the Marquesas and Easter Islands. It is generally found in shallow coastal and reef habitats, and is known for its nocturnal, often reclusive behavior. The population found in Hawai'i was originally classified as a subspecies (C. cinereus marginatus), but was later considered its own species (Conger marginatus).

== Description ==
Conger cinereus has a slender, elongated body, with larger individuals reaching about 1.3–1.4 m (4 ft 3 in – 4 ft 7 in) in length. Its coloration is gray-brown in daylight, but has been reported to show blue-gray bands at night, which is thought to aid in camouflage. A dark line below the eye that extends across the upper lip gives rise to the common name "moustache conger".

== Distribution and habitat ==
Conger cinereus occurs across much of the Indo-West Pacific. Its range extends from the Red Sea and eastern African region, including Madagascar, the Seychelles, and Tanzania, to the Marquesas and Easter Islands. Reports place the northern edge of its range around southern Japan and the Ogasawara Islands, with its southern limit being recorded around northern Australia and Lord Howe Island.

It is found in various coastal habitats, including reefs, seagrass beds, and sandy bottoms, and is usually found between 1–80 m (3 ft 3 in – 262 ft 6 in) deep, with occasional records from greater depths. It has also been documented in brackish waters, and frequently occupies neritic and subtidal zones near reefs.

== Behavior ==
Conger cinereus is generally nocturnal, and tends to be solitary, remaining concealed in crevices, sand, or rubble during the day. After dark, it emerges to feed, sometimes remaining still in exposed spots when illuminated. Its diet consists largely of small fish and crustaceans, though it may scavenge on occasion.
