= Grey conger =

Conservation status
- Least Concern (IUCN 3.1)

Scientific classification
- Kingdom: Animalia
- Phylum: Chordata
- Class: Actinopterygii
- Order: Anguilliformes
- Family: Congridae
- Genus: Conger
- Species: C. esculentus

Binomial name
- Conger esculentus Poey, 1861

Species of fish

The grey conger (Conger esculentus), also known as the Antillean conger or simply the conger eel, is an eel in the family Congridae (conger/garden eels). It was described by Felipe Poey in 1861. It is a tropical and subtropical, marine eel which is known from the western central Atlantic Ocean, including Cuba, Jamaica, and throughout northern South America. It dwells at a depth range of 120–400 metres, and leads a benthic lifestyle, inhabiting coral reefs and rocky regions. Males can reach a maximum total length of 160 centimetres, but more commonly reach a TL of 90 centimetres.

The grey conger feeds predominantly on finfish. It supports a minor commercial food fish fishery, it can be consumed fresh or can be salted.
