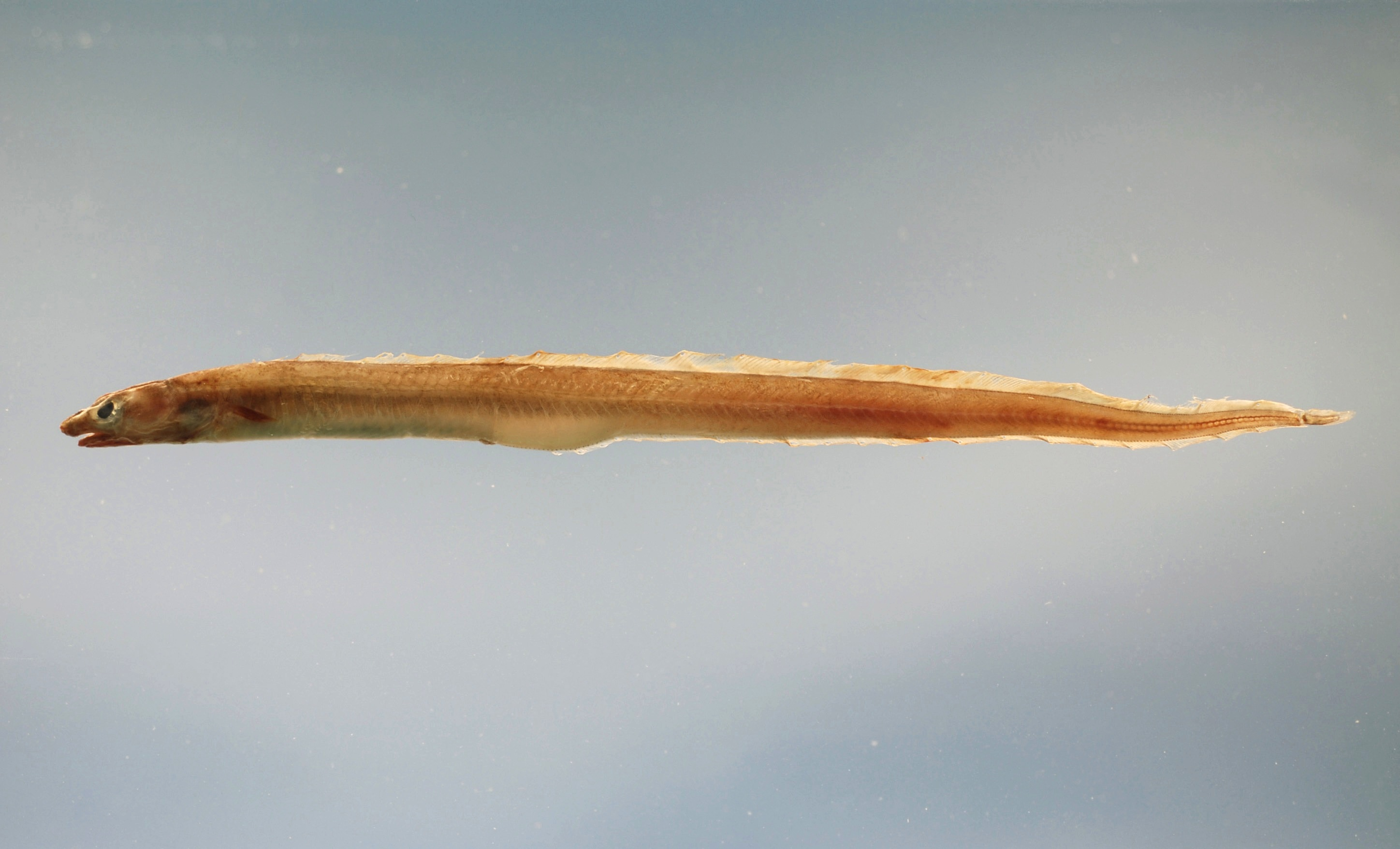

Conservation status
- Least Concern (IUCN 3.1)

Scientific classification
- Kingdom: Animalia
- Phylum: Chordata
- Class: Actinopterygii
- Order: Anguilliformes
- Family: Congridae
- Genus: Conger
- Species: C. oceanicus

Binomial name
- Conger oceanicus (Mitchill, 1818)

Synonyms
- Anguilla oceanica Mitchill, 1818; Conger oceanica (Mitchill, 1818)

= American conger =

Species of fish

The American conger (Conger oceanicus) is a species of eel in the family Congridae. Other common names for this fish include conger, dog eel, poison eel and sea eel. It is a marine fish with a widespread distribution in the Western Atlantic from Cape Cod in Massachusetts to northeastern Florida in United States and the northern Gulf of Mexico, and is also reported from near the mid-Atlantic island of St. Helena and off the coast of Nova Scotia in Canada. With a dark-grayish color, it can grow to about 6.5 feet (2.0 m) long and weigh more than 40 kg (88 lb).

== Description ==
The American conger is a large, elongated, cylindrical fish growing to a maximum length of over 2 m (6.6 ft) and a maximum weight of over 40 kg (88 lb), though a more typical length is about a meter. The upper jaw projects further forward than the lower jaw. The dorsal fin starts just behind the pectoral fins and runs in a continuous even ribbon to the tip of the tail, where it fuses with the similarly long and uniform anal fin. The dorsal surface is some shade of dark gray while the ventral surface is whitish. The dorsal and anal fins have a dark margin.

== Ecology ==
This eel lives on the seabed and is a nocturnal predator. Its diet consists mainly of fish, but it also feeds on molluscs and crustaceans. It is migratory, but although the juveniles make use of estuaries, American congers do not have a freshwater phase as do some other species of eel. Mature individuals leave the continental shelf during the summer, cross the Gulf Stream, and make their way to the Sargasso Sea north of the Bahamas; here they spawn in floating masses of sargassum in the autumn and winter, after which they are believed to die. The larvae are called leptocephali, and after hatching, leave the mass of algae and soon get carried along by the Gulf Stream. Here they develop through four larval stages until undergoing metamorphosis into elvers when about 10 cm (4 in) long. Leaving the Gulf Stream they swim towards the coast where they become benthic and may enter the mouths of rivers, but as they are cryptic at this stage, they are difficult to study.

== Status ==
C. oceanicus has a wide range and occurs in both shallow water and in deeper water over the continental shelf. It is a common fish, no particular threats have been recognised, and the International Union for Conservation of Nature has assessed its conservation status as being of "least concern". The American conger is the subject of some fishing activities, being caught recreationally or as bycatch, by hook and line, in fish traps or by trawling across the seabed. Catch by net or trap in the elver stage is closely regulated by the State of Maine, with licensing granted via a lottery system administered by the State and a neutral third party. The conger was historically fished commercially; its flesh is edible, often being smoked before consumption.
