= Conger macrocephalus =

Conservation status
- Least Concern (IUCN 3.1)

Scientific classification
- Kingdom: Animalia
- Phylum: Chordata
- Class: Actinopterygii
- Order: Anguilliformes
- Family: Congridae
- Genus: Conger
- Species: C. macrocephalus

Binomial name
- Conger macrocephalus Kanazawa, 1958

Species of fish

Conger macrocephalus is an eel in the family Congridae (conger/garden eels). It was described by Robert H. Kanazawa in 1958. It is a marine, deep water-dwelling eel which is known from the Philippines, in the western central Pacific Ocean. It is known to dwell at a depth of 329 metres.
