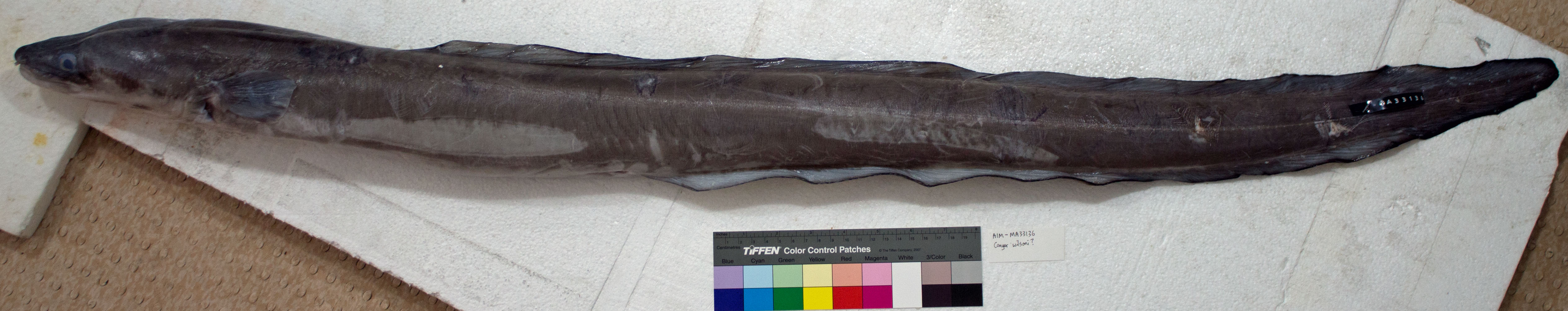

Conservation status
- Least Concern (IUCN 3.1)

Scientific classification
- Kingdom: Animalia
- Phylum: Chordata
- Class: Actinopterygii
- Order: Anguilliformes
- Family: Congridae
- Genus: Conger
- Species: C. wilsoni

Binomial name
- Conger wilsoni (Bloch & J. G. Schneider, 1801)

Synonyms
- Conger conger (non Linnaeus, 1758); Gymnothorax wilsoni Bloch & Schneider, 1801; Leptocephalus wilsoni (Bloch & Schneider, 1801)

= Cape conger =

Species of fish

The Cape conger (Conger wilsoni) is a conger of the family Congridae, found in the Indo-Pacific region. Its length is up to 1 m.
