= Conger oligoporus =

Conservation status
- Least Concern (IUCN 3.1)

Scientific classification
- Kingdom: Animalia
- Phylum: Chordata
- Class: Actinopterygii
- Division: Teleostei
- Order: Anguilliformes
- Family: Congridae
- Genus: Conger
- Species: C. oligoporus

Binomial name
- Conger oligoporus Kanazawa, 1958

Species of fish

Conger oligoporus is an eel in the family Congridae (conger/garden eels). It was described by Robert H. Kanazawa in 1958. It is a tropical, marine eel which is known from Hawaii and Guam, in the eastern central and western central Pacific Ocean. It dwells at a depth range of 2–507 metres, and leads a benthic lifestyle, inhabiting crevices of hard substrata. It feeds predominantly on finfish.
