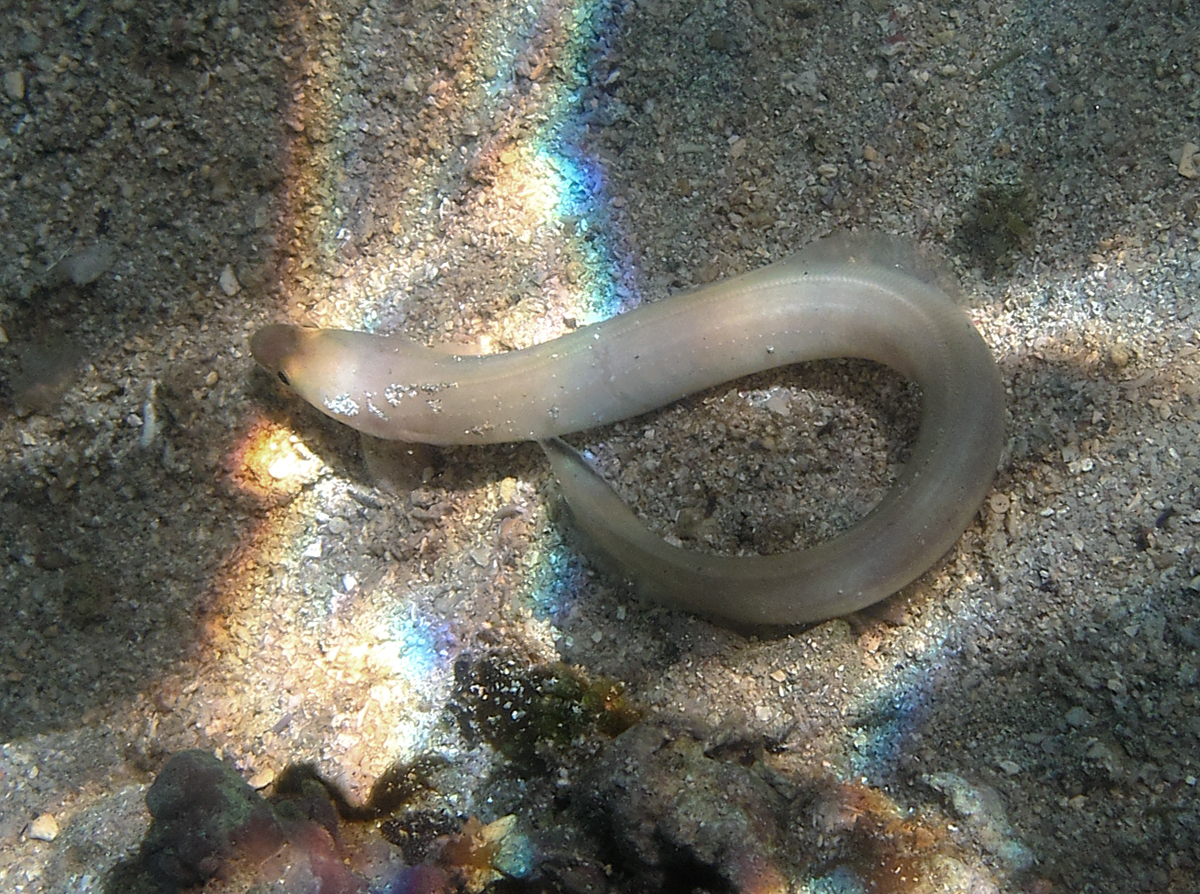
- juvenile

Scientific classification
- Kingdom: Animalia
- Phylum: Chordata
- Class: Actinopterygii
- Division: Teleostei
- Order: Anguilliformes
- Family: Congridae
- Genus: Ariosoma
- Species: A. anago

Binomial name
- Ariosoma anago (Temminck & Schlegel, 1846)

Synonyms
- Conger anago Temminck & Schlegel, 1846; Anago anago (Temminck & Schlegel, 1846); Ariosome anago (Temminck & Schlegel, 1846) (misspelling)

= Silvery conger =

Species of fish

The silvery conger (Ariosoma anago) also known as the sea conger, the darkfin conger, the dark-finned conger-eel, or simply the conger eel, is an eel in the family Congridae (conger/garden eels). It was described by Coenraad Jacob Temminck and Hermann Schlegel in 1846, originally under the genus Conger. It is a tropical, marine eel which is known to dwell in sandy and muddy bottoms on coasts in the Indo-west Pacific. Males can reach a maximum total length of 60 centimetres (24 in).

The silvery conger's diet consists primarily of benthic crustaceans and finfish.
