= Manytooth conger =

Conservation status
- Least Concern (IUCN 3.1)

Scientific classification
- Kingdom: Animalia
- Phylum: Chordata
- Class: Actinopterygii
- Division: Teleostei
- Order: Anguilliformes
- Family: Congridae
- Genus: Conger
- Species: C. triporiceps

Binomial name
- Conger triporiceps Kanazawa, 1958

Species of fish

The manytooth conger (Conger triporiceps), also known as the manytooth conger eel or simply the conger eel, is an eel in the family Congridae (conger/garden eels). It was described by Robert H. Kanazawa in 1958. It is a tropical, marine eel which is known from the western Atlantic Ocean, including the United States, Bermuda, the Antilles, the western Caribbean, and Brazil. It dwells at a depth range of 3–55 meters, and leads a benthic lifestyle, inhabiting rocky regions and coral reefs. Males can reach a maximum total length of 100 centimeters, but more commonly reach a TL of 80 cm.

The manytooth conger is harvested by subsistence fisheries.
