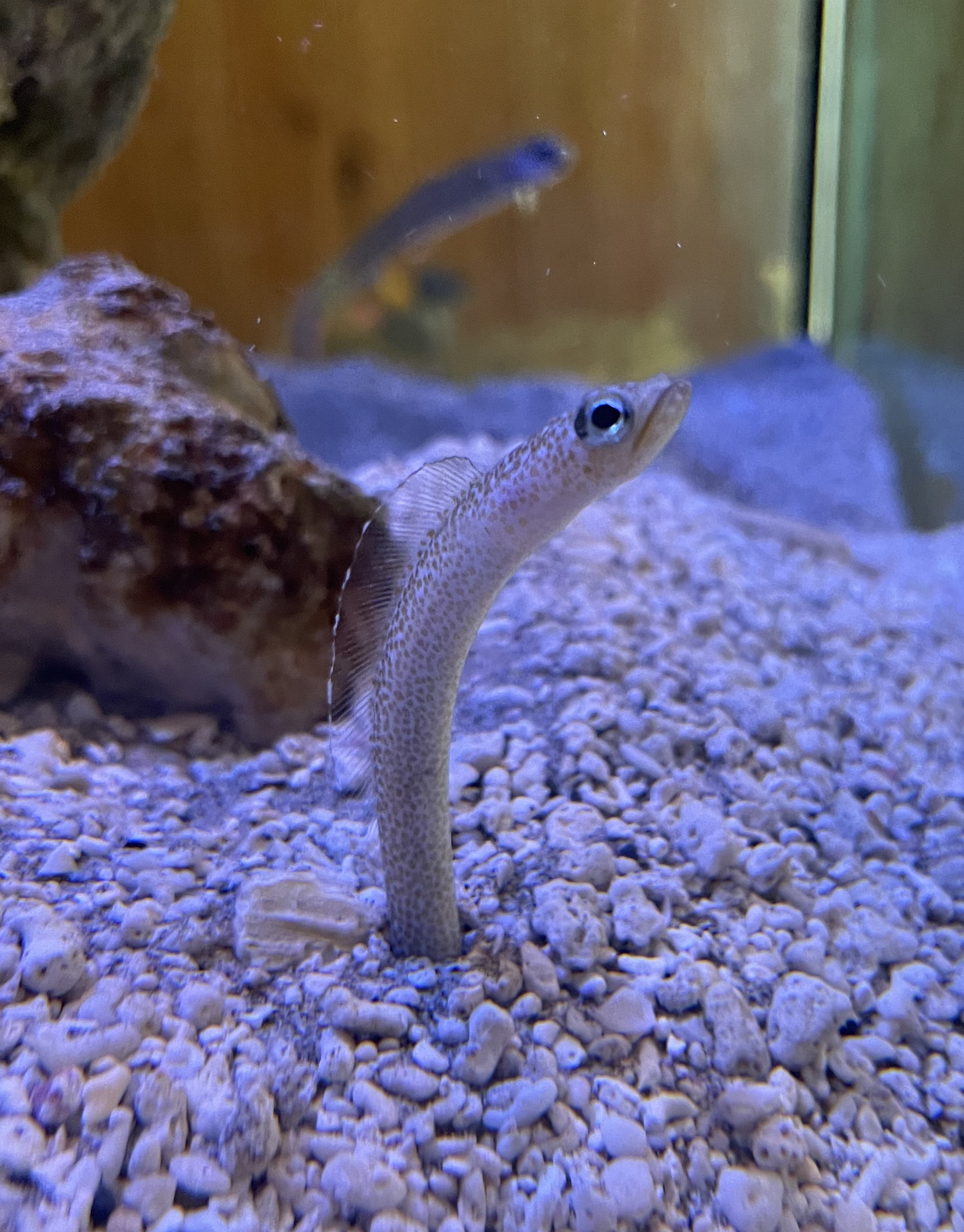

Scientific classification
- Kingdom: Animalia
- Phylum: Chordata
- Class: Actinopterygii
- Order: Anguilliformes
- Family: Congridae
- Genus: Gorgasia
- Species: G. japonica

Binomial name
- Gorgasia japonica Abe, Miki & Minoru Asai, 1977

= Pacific spaghetti eel =

Species of fish

The Pacific spaghetti eel (Gorgasia japonica) is a sand dwelling eel in the family Congridae (conger/garden eels). It was described by Tokiharu Abe, M. Miki and Minoru Asai in 1977. It is a marine, temperate water-dwelling eel which is known from the northwestern and southwestern Pacific Ocean, including Japan (from which its species epithet is derived) and New Zealand. It dwells at a maximum depth of 30 metres (98 ft). It is non-migratory, and inhabits sand flats near reefs. Males can reach a maximum total length of 100 centimetres (39 in); the diameter of the body is approximately 10 millimetres. Spaghetti eels will typically occur in large groups that can consist of hundreds of eels.

The Pacific spaghetti eel's diet consists of zooplankton.
