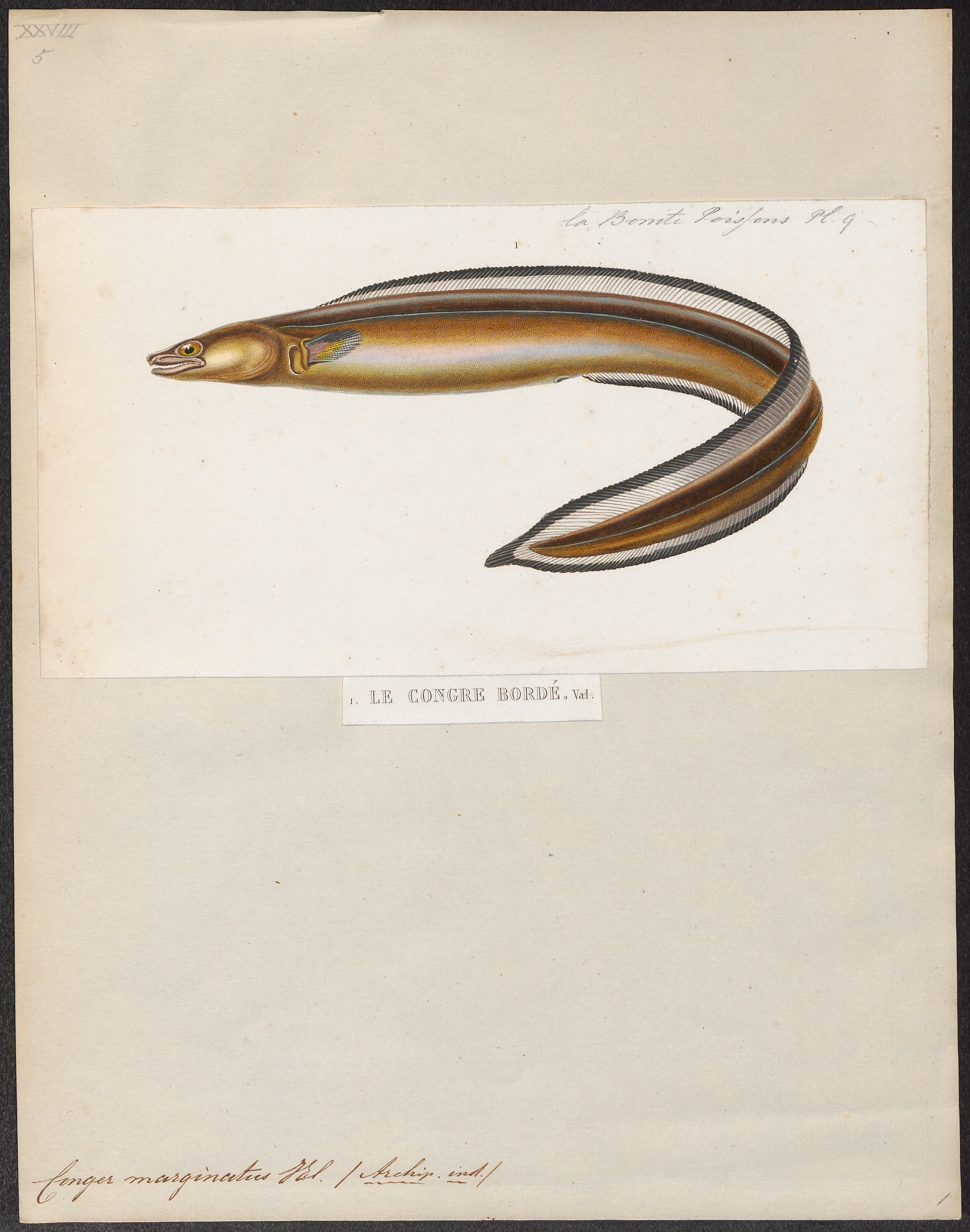
- Illustration
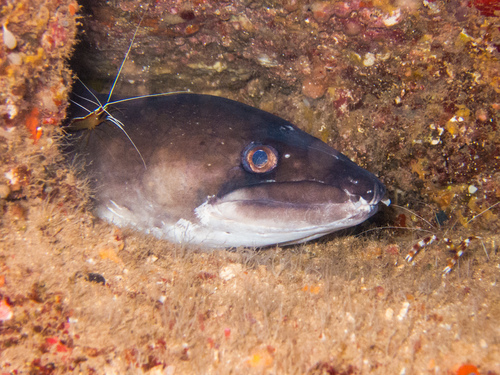
- Live animal seen off Oahu

Conservation status
- Data Deficient (IUCN 3.1)

Scientific classification
- Kingdom: Animalia
- Phylum: Chordata
- Class: Actinopterygii
- Order: Anguilliformes
- Family: Congridae
- Genus: Conger
- Species: C. marginatus

Binomial name
- Conger marginatus Valenciennes, 1850

Synonyms
- Conger cinereus marginatus Valenciennes, 1850; Conger cinereus (non Rüppell, 1830)

= Conger marginatus =

Species of fish

Conger marginatus, the Hawaiian mustache conger, is a species of conger eel described by Achille Valenciennes in 1850.
