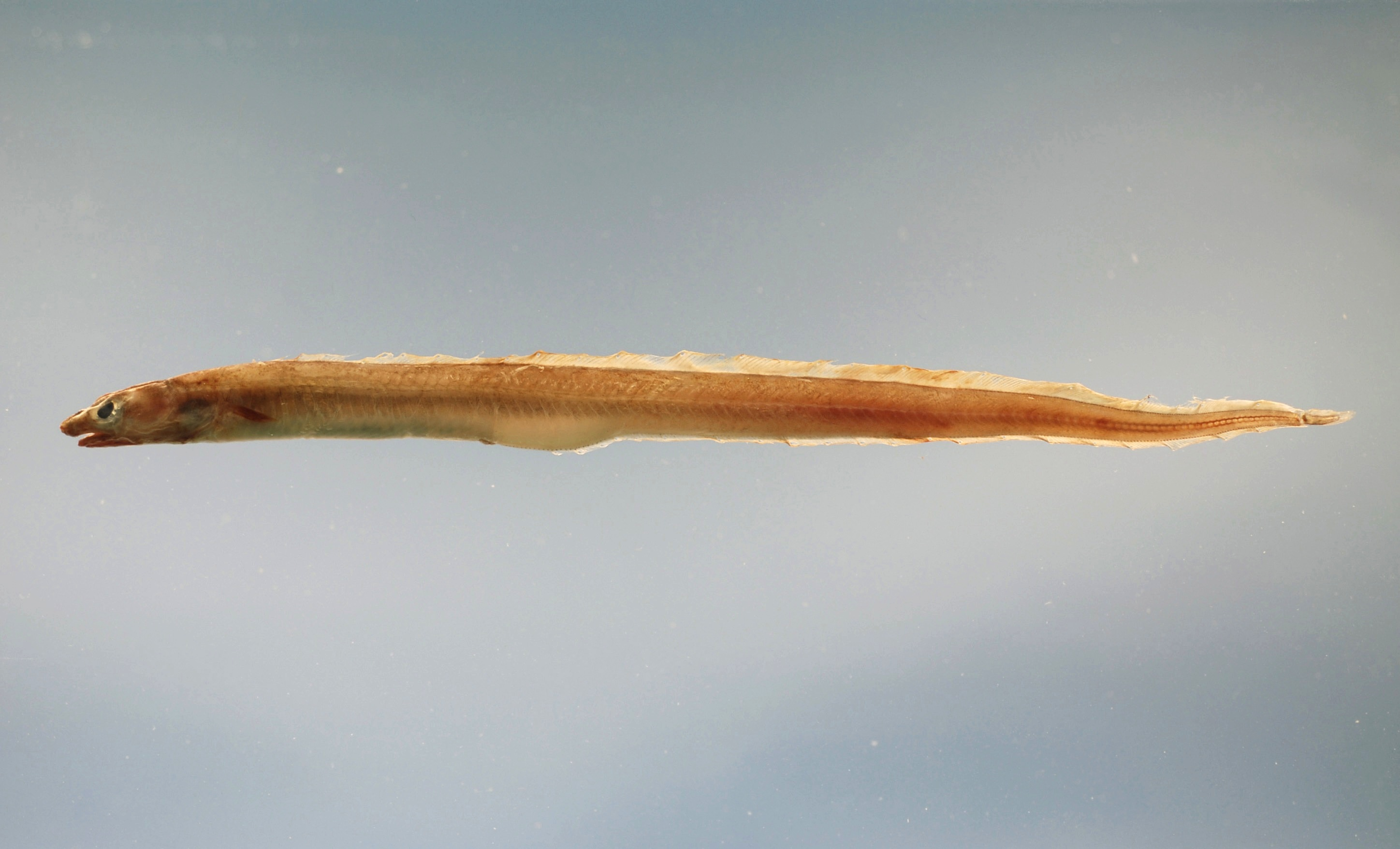
- Conger oceanicus

Scientific classification
- Kingdom: Animalia
- Phylum: Chordata
- Class: Actinopterygii
- Order: Anguilliformes
- Family: Congridae
- Subfamily: Congrinae
- Genus: Conger; Cuvier, 1817

Type species
- Muraena conger Linnaeus, 1758

Species
- See text.

= Conger =

Conger Temporal range: 55–0 Ma Early Eocene to Present

Genus of fishes

Conger (/ˈkɒŋɡər/ KONG-gər) is a genus of marine congrid eels. It includes some of the largest types of eels, ranging up to two metres (6 1/2 feet) or more in length, in the case of the European conger. Large congers have often been observed by divers during the day in parts of the Mediterranean Sea, and both European and American congers are sometimes caught by fishermen along the European and North American Atlantic coasts.

The life histories of most conger eels are poorly known. Based on collections of their small leptocephalus larvae, the American conger eel has been found to spawn in the southwestern Sargasso Sea, close to the spawning areas of the Atlantic freshwater eels.

"Conger" or "conger eel" is sometimes included in the common names of species of the family Congridae, including members of this genus.

== Description ==
Congers have wide mouths with sturdy teeth, usually a variant of gray or black in coloration. They have no scales. Their body weight can reach over 57 kilograms (126 pounds).

== Species ==
- †Conger brevisulcus (Schwarzhans, 1980)
- Conger cinereus Rüppell, 1830 (longfin African conger)
- Conger conger (Linnaeus, 1758) (European conger)
- †Conger davidsmithi (Schwarzhans, 2019)
- Conger erebennus (D. S. Jordan & Snyder, 1901) (Anaconger)
- Conger esculentus Poey, 1861 (grey conger)
- Conger japonicus Bleeker, 1879
- Conger jordani Kanazawa, 1958
- Conger macrocephalus Kanazawa, 1958
- Conger marginatus Valenciennes, 1850 (Hawaiian Mustache Conger)
- Conger melanopterus Kideeswaran, D. G. Smith, Deepa Dhas, Ajith Kumar, 2023
- Conger monganius Phillipps, 1932
- Conger myriaster (Brevoort, 1856) (whitespotted conger)
- Conger oceanicus (Mitchill, 1818) (American conger)
- Conger oligoporus Kanazawa, 1958
- Conger orbignianus Valenciennes, 1842 (Argentine conger)
- Conger philippinus Kanazawa, 1958
- †Conger tokoroa Schwarzhans, 2019
- Conger triporiceps Kanazawa, 1958 (manytooth conger)
- Conger verreauxi Kaup, 1856 (southern conger)
- Conger wilsoni (Bloch & J. G. Schneider, 1801) (Cape conger)

=== Formerly Included Species ===
- Conger anagoides Bleeker, 1853 (sea conger) - now Ariosoma anagoides
- Conger auratus Costa, 1844 (bandtooth conger) - now Ariosoma balearicum

== Fishing ==
Fishing for congers was first recorded in the 12th century. The Norman taxation Pipe Roll recorded two éperquerie on Guernsey and one on Sark. These were designated places where congers were dried.

One species of the conger eel, Conger myriaster, is an important food fish in East Asia. It is often served as sushi.

== Behaviour ==
Congers are predators and can attack humans. In July 2013, a diver was attacked by a European conger eel in Killary Harbour, Ireland, at a depth of 25 m (80 ft). The eel bit a large chunk from his face. The diver reported the creature was more than 1.8 m (6 ft) in length and "about the width of a human thigh".
