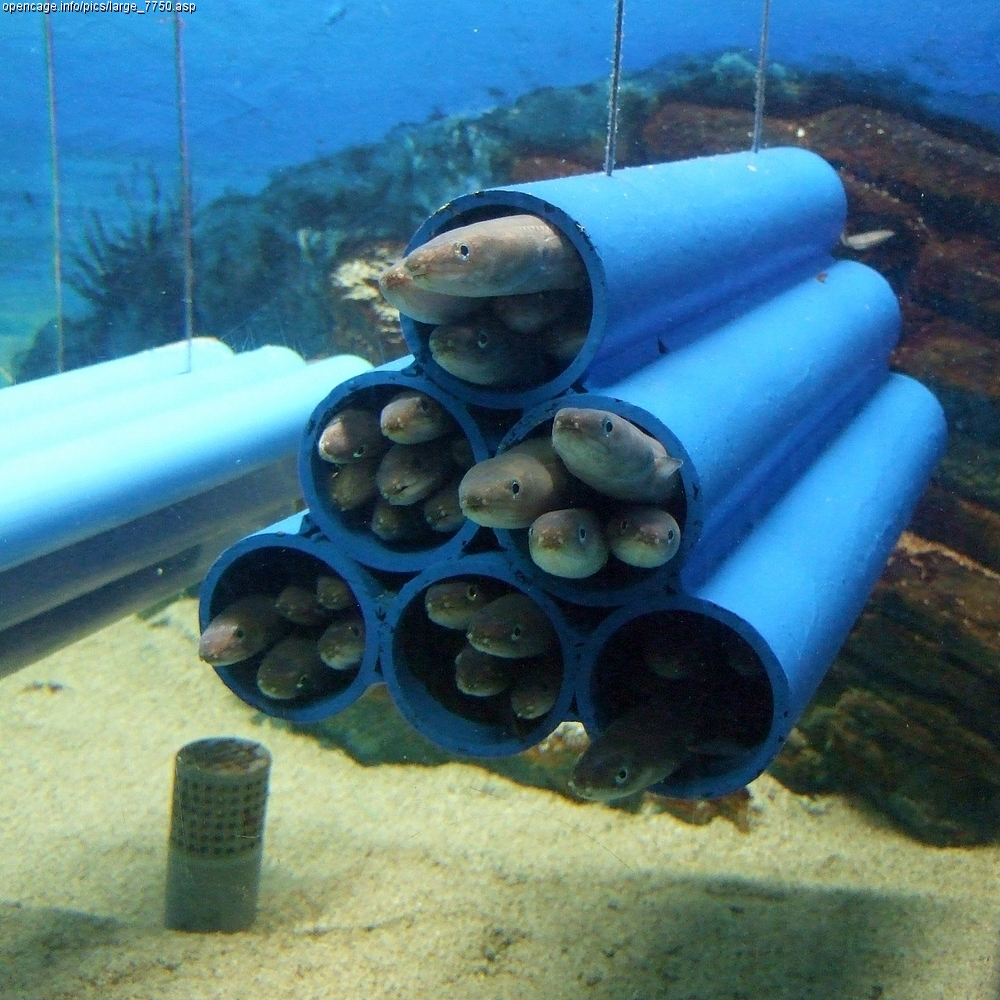

Conservation status
- Least Concern (IUCN 3.1)

Scientific classification
- Kingdom: Animalia
- Phylum: Chordata
- Class: Actinopterygii
- Order: Anguilliformes
- Family: Congridae
- Genus: Conger
- Species: C. myriaster

Binomial name
- Conger myriaster Brevoort, 1856

Synonyms
- Anguilla myriaster Brevoort, 1856; Astroconger myriaster Brevoort, 1856

= Whitespotted conger =

Species of fish

Conger myriaster eels

The whitespotted conger (Conger myriaster) (Japanese: 真穴子; ma-anago) is a marine conger eel, widespread in the northwest Pacific Ocean off the coasts of Japan, North Korea, South Korea, China, Taiwan, and the Philippines. It is a commercially important species.

== Taxonomy ==
The whitespotted conger was first described by James Carson Brevoort in 1856. It is classified in the Congridae family (conger and garden eels) in the class Actinopterygii. It has been referred to by the synonyms Anguilla myriaster and Astroconger myriaster.

== Distribution ==
This species occurs in the northwest Pacific Ocean, Sea of Japan, and East China Sea. It is found off the coasts of Japan, North Korea, South Korea, China, Taiwan, and the Philippines.

== Description ==
The whitespotted conger grows up to 100 centimetres (39 in) in total length and lives for as long as eight to twelve years. Its body is covered in white spots.

== Ecology ==
A benthic, demersal fish species, the whitespotted conger occurs at depths of 320–830 metres (1,050–2,720 ft). It prefers sandy and muddy substrates. It preys on crustaceans.

The whitespotted conger reaches sexual maturity at eight years of age. It spawns from April to July, and the species is believed to have a single spawning ground; the larvae would be spread by ocean currents.

This species is commercially fished via lines, nets, and traps. Annual catches have reached 10,000 metric tons in both Japan and South Korea, and the fish is farmed in Japan as well. It is also taken for the aquarium trade. Despite this, it is assessed as a least concern species on the IUCN Red List due to its abundance.
