= Uwe Kils =

German marine biologist

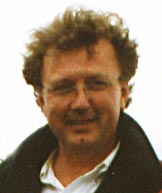
Uwe Kils

Uwe Kils (10 July 1951 in Flensburg – January 2016 in Flensburg) was a German marine biologist specializing in Antarctic biology.

== Career ==
His boss work led to the development of instruments for in situ observation of underwater fauna, including the ecoSCOPE and the first software for full speed video processing. Later work at Kiel included the study of predator-prey interactions of juvenile herring and plankton, for which a floating laboratory was built called ATOLL.

== Awards ==
Year	Award	Organization	Result
1979	Heinz Maier Leibnitz Prize	Deutsche Forschungsgemeinschaft (DFG) ("German Research Society")	Won

== Photos by Kils ==
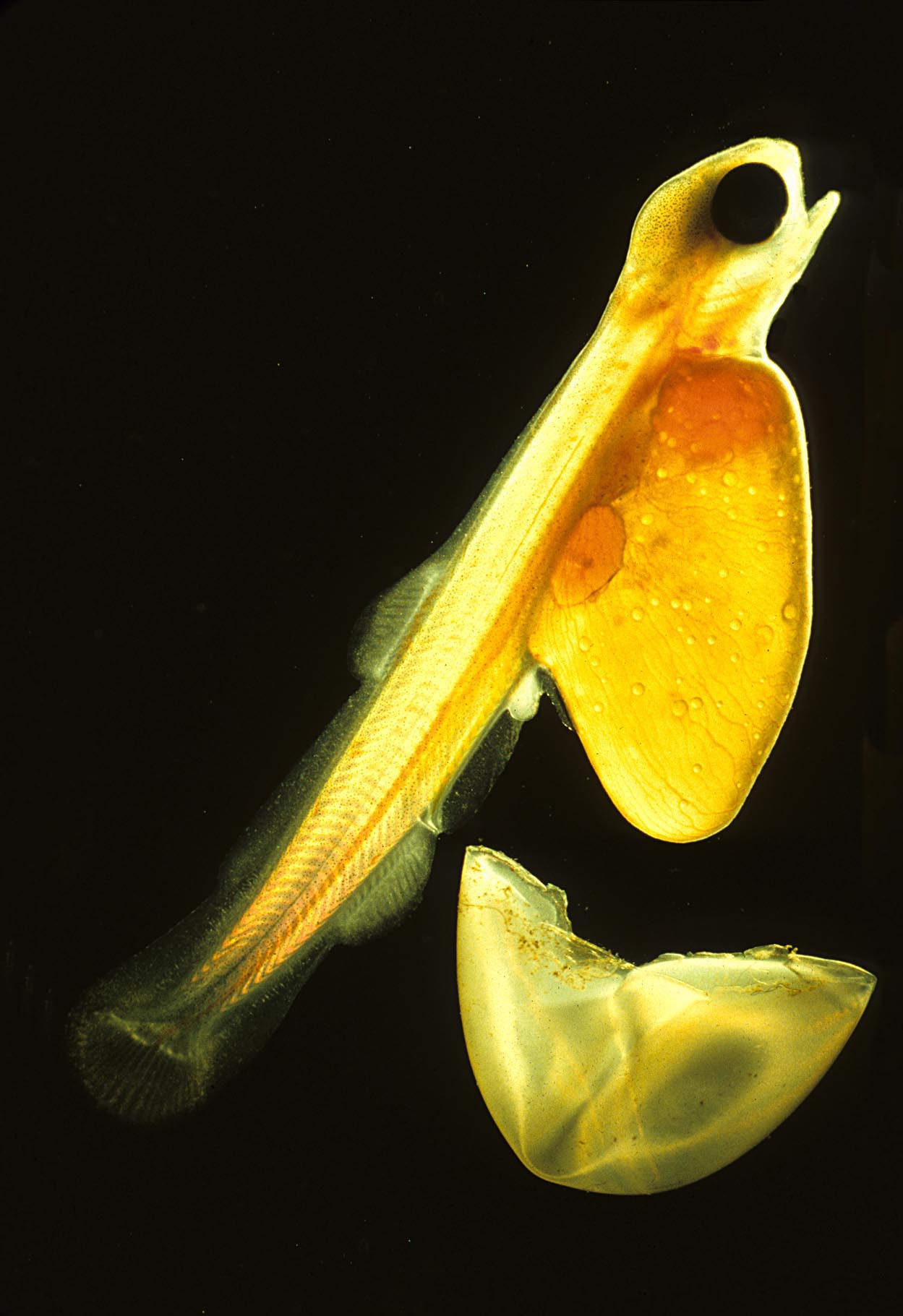
Salmon egg hatching (Salmo salar)

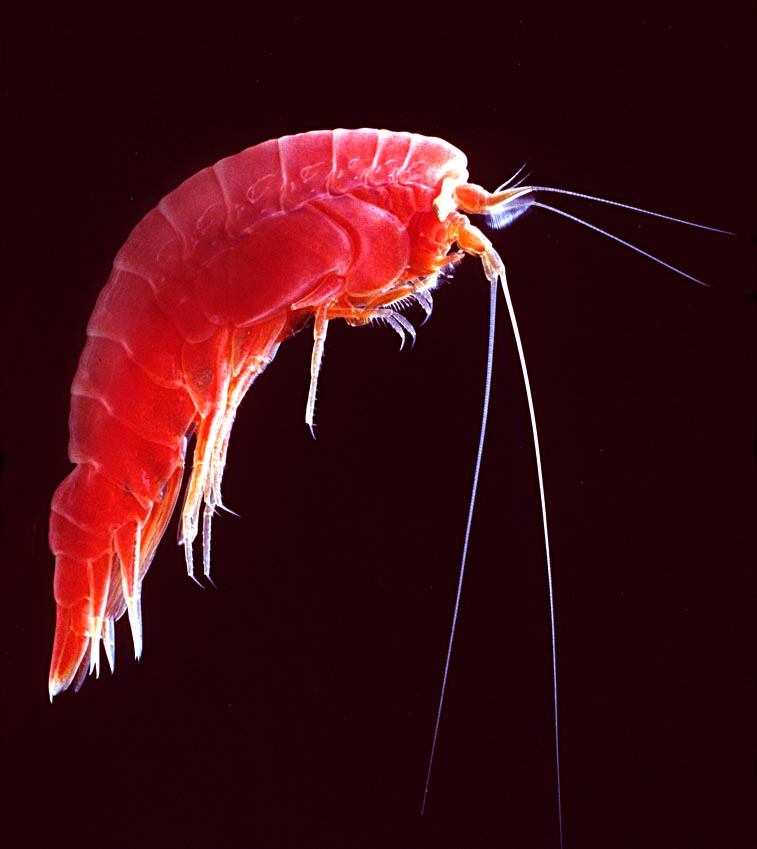
Amphipod image (possibly Ampeliscidae)

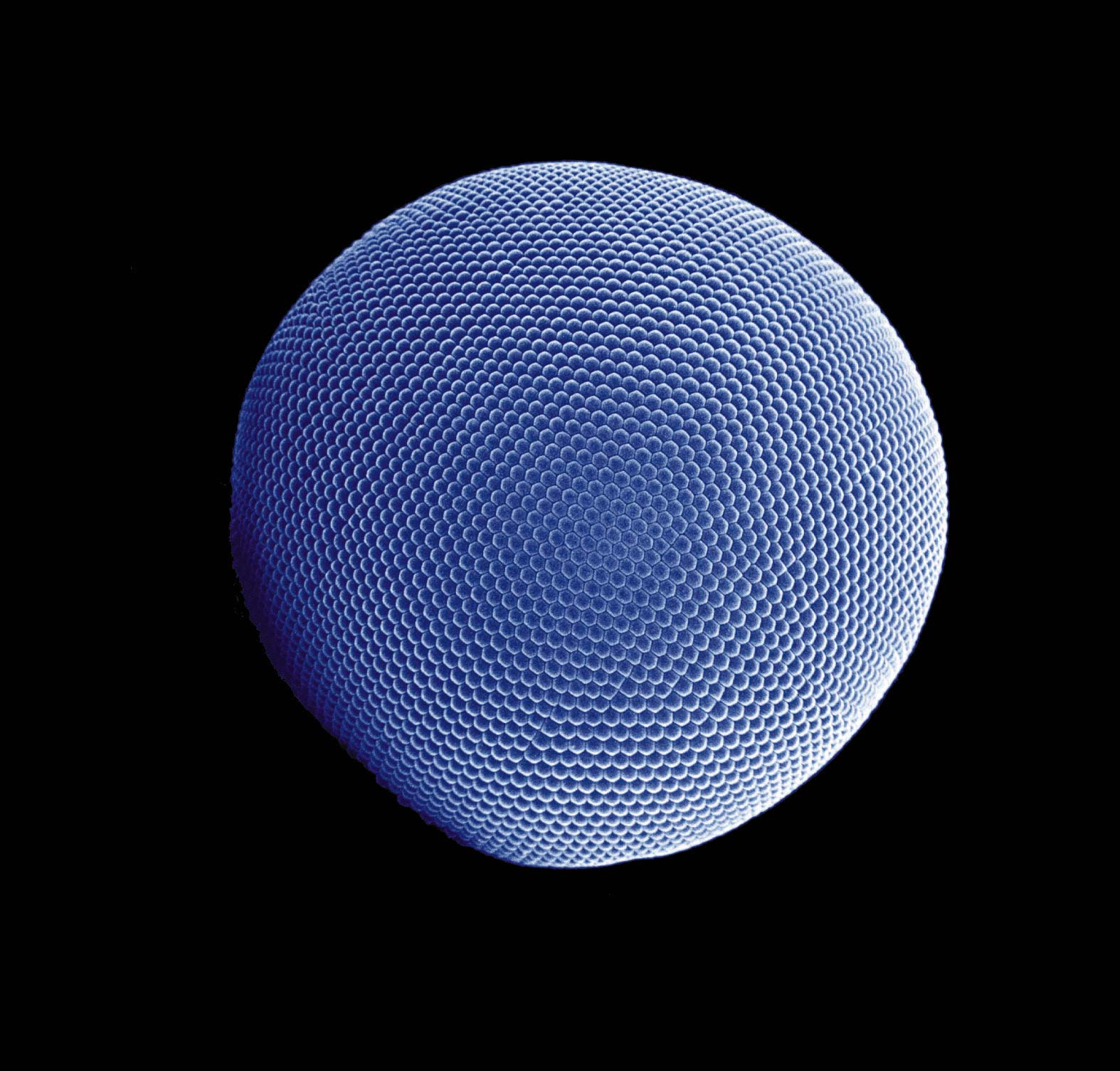
Compound eye of the Antarctic krill Euphausia superba

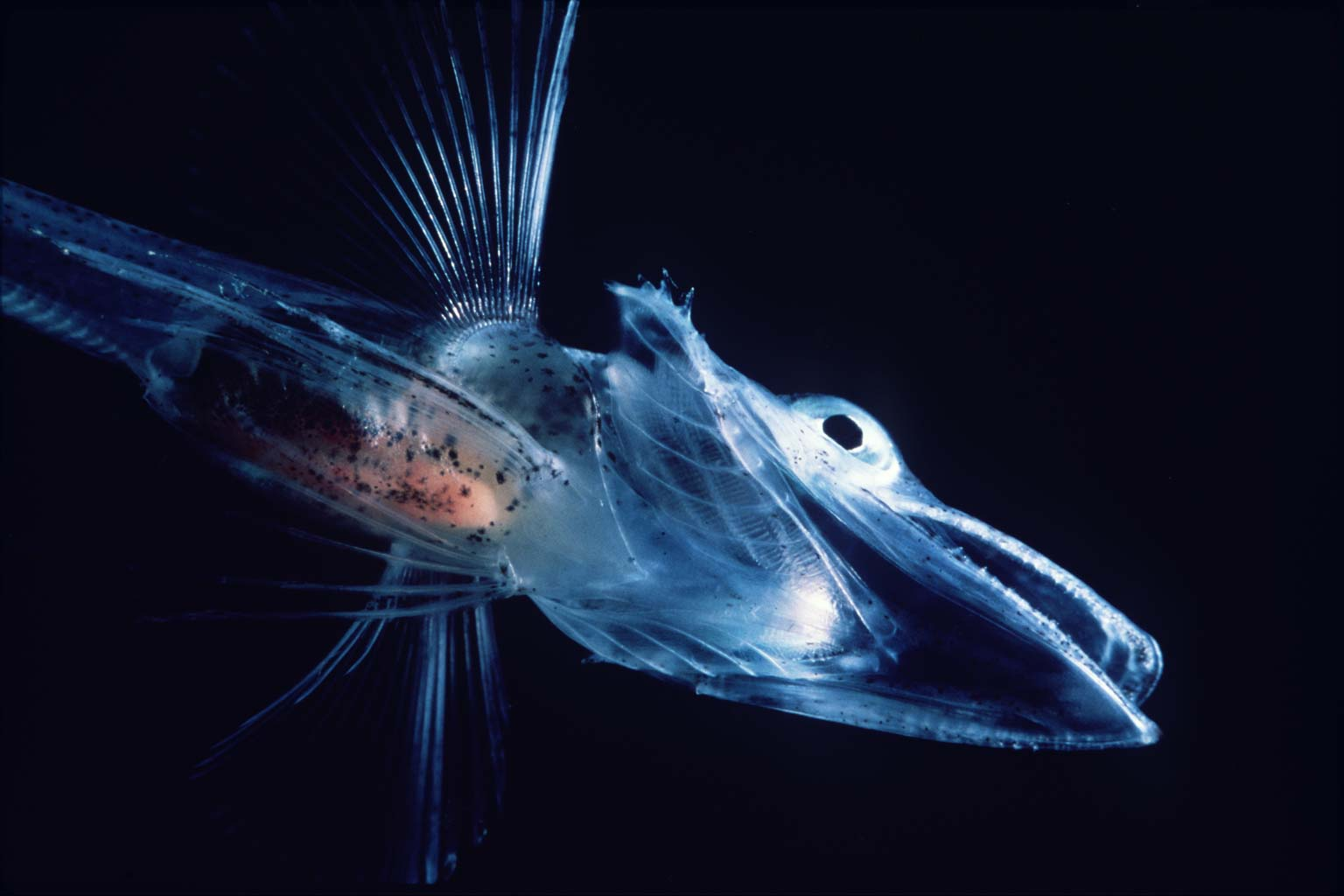
Larvae of an Antarctic icefish

== Selected publications ==
- Kils, U.: "Swimming Behavior, Swimming Performance, and Energy Balance of Antarctic krill Euphausia superba", translation of Ph.D. thesis in German from 1979, College Station, Texas; 1981. Available free via Wikisource
- Kils, U., Klages, N. (1979) "Der Krill" Naturwissenschaftliche Rundschau, 10: 397–402.
- Kils, U. (1987) "Verhaltensphysiologische Untersuchungen an pelagischen Schwärmen – Schwarmbildung als Strategie zur Orientierung in Umwelt-Gradienten. Bedeutung der Schwarmbildung in der Aquakultur", (Habilitation), Universität Kiel, Ber Inst Meereskunde, Kiel 163: 1–168.
- Kils, U. (1983) Swimming and feeding of Antarctic Krill, Euphausia superba – some outstanding energetics and dynamics – some unique morphological details. In: Berichte zur Polarforschung, Alfred-Wegener-Institut fuer Polarforschung, Sonderheft 4 (1983). On the biology of Krill Euphausia superba, Proceedings of the Seminar and Report of Krill Ecology Group, ed. S. B. Schnack, 130 – 155
- Kils, U., Marschall, P. (1995) "Der Krill, wie er schwimmt und frisst – neue Einsichten mit neuen Methoden" (The Antarctic krill – feeding and swimming performances – new insights with new methods). In: Hempel, I., Hempel, G., Biologie der Polarmeere – Erlebnisse und Ergebnisse. Gustav Fischer Jena – Stuttgart – New York, 201 – 207
- Kils, U., (2006) "So frisst der Krill" How krill feeds. In: Hempel, G., Hempel, I., Schiel, S., Faszination Meeresforschung, Ein oekologisches Lesebuch. Hauschild Bremen, 112–115.
