= Dunglow Lough =

Lake in County Donegal, Ireland

- Loch an Chlocháin Léith (Irish)
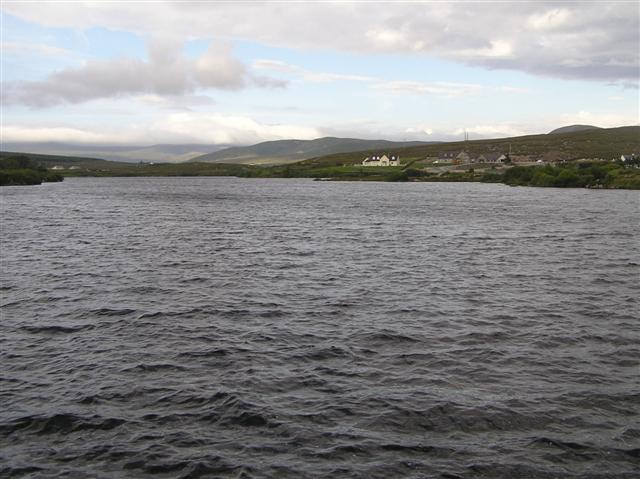

- Location in Ireland
- Location: County Donegal
- Coordinates: 54°57′16″N 8°20′35″W
- Primary inflows: Lough Craghy
- Primary outflows: Dungloe River
- Catchment area: 37.67 km^{2} (14.5 sq mi)
- Basin countries: Ireland
- Max. length: 1.4 km (1 mi)
- Max. width: 0.7 km (0.4 mi)
- Surface area: 0.61 km^{2} (0.24 sq mi)
- Average depth: 1.3 m (4 ft 3 in)
- Max. depth: 7.5 m (25 ft)
- Surface elevation: 13 m (43 ft)
- Islands: Flat Island, Fern Island, Black Island, Brush Island, Wren Island

Dunglow Lough (Irish: Loch an Chlocháin Léith), also known as Dungloe Lough, is a freshwater lake in the northwest of Ireland. It is located in north County Donegal in the Rosses fishery.

== Geography ==
Dunglow Lough is 1 kilometre (0.6 mi) east of Dungloe. It measures about 1.5 km (0.9 mi) long and 1 km (0.6 mi) wide. The lake has five named islands.

== Hydrology ==
Dunglow Lough is fed on its eastern side by neighbouring Lough Craghy. The lake drains westwards into the Dungloe River.

== Natural history ==
Fish species in Dunglow Lough include brown trout, salmon and the critically endangered European eel.

== See also ==
- List of loughs in Ireland
