= Antarctic Technology Offshore Lagoon Laboratory =

Floating oceanographic laboratory for in situ observation experiments

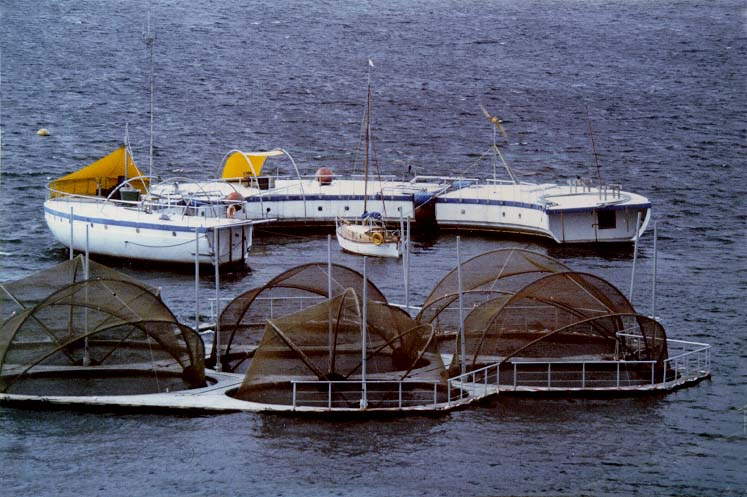
The ATOLL laboratory, here in front of the Kiel powerplant together with netcages with salmonids

The Antarctic Technology Offshore Lagoon Laboratory (ATOLL) was a floating oceanographic laboratory for in situ observation experiments. This facility also tested instruments and equipment for polar expeditions. The ATOLL hull was the largest fiberglass structure ever built at that time. It was in operation from 1982 to 1995.

== Structure and infrastructure ==
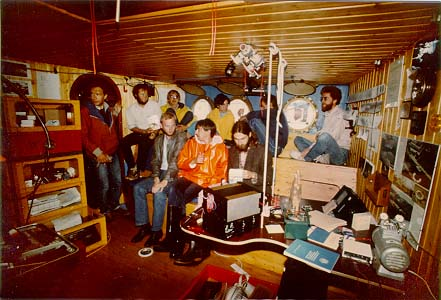
Small lecture room on board with international students in a course on aquaculture technology

The ATOLL was composed of three curved fiberglass elements, each 25 m (82 ft) long and having a draught of only 38 cm (15 in). For towing, the elements could be assembled in a long S-shape; in operation, the elements would form a horseshoe shape surrounding 150 m^{2} (1,615 sq ft) water surface. The lab provided ample space for twelve researchers. The laboratory contained a lab, storage and supply facilities, a dormitory, computer room, and a fireplace.

The laboratory was installed and operated in the Baltic Sea (and the Bay of Kiel in particular) at the initiative and under the direction of Uwe Kils, at the Institute of Oceanography (Institut für Meereskunde) of Kiel University. The fiberglass hulls themselves were bought from Waki Zöllner's "Atoll" company.

The onboard computer was a NeXT and the first versions of a virtual microscope of Antarctic krill for interactive dives into their morphology and behavior were developed here, finding later mention in Science magazine. The lab was connected to the Internet via a radio link, and the first images of ocean critters on the internet came from this NeXT. The first ever in situ videos of Atlantic herring feeding on copepods were recorded from this lab.

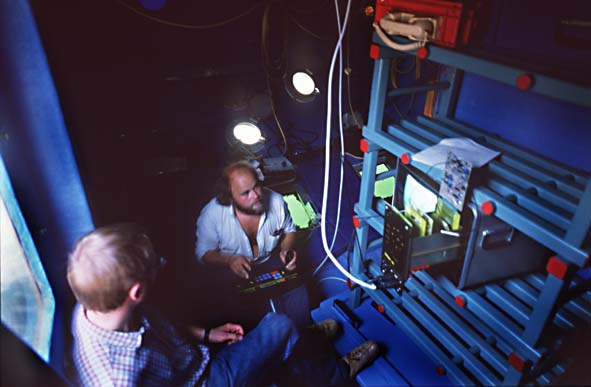
Underwater observation room with two square windows, controller for the ROV with visitors from Norway for testing of "Sprint" ROV.

An underwater observation and experimentation room allowed direct observation and manipulation through large portholes.

The technical equipment included an ultra-high-resolution scanning sonar that was used for locating schools of juvenile herring, for guiding a ROV, which was controlled via a cyberhelmet and glove, and for determining positions, distances, and speeds. Probes measured the water salinity, temperature, and oxygen levels. Special instruments could measure plankton-, particle-, and bubble-concentrations and their size distributions. Imaging equipment included low-light still and high speed video cameras using shuttered Laser-sheet or infrared LED illumination. An endoscope-system for non-invasive optical measurements called ecoSCOPE, which could also be mounted on an ROV, was developed and used to record the microscale dynamics and behavior of the highly evasive herring.

== Research ==
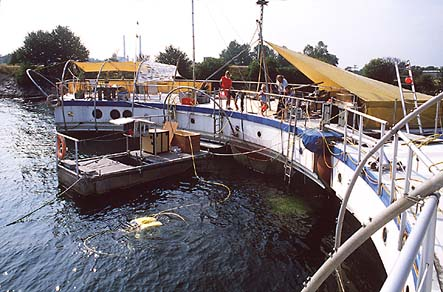
ROV in the lagoon for testing before Antarctic missions

Scientific investigations aboard the ATOLL concentrated on one of the most important food chain transitions: the linkages between the early life stages of herring (Clupea harengus) and their principal prey, the copepods. A major hypothesis of fisheries ecologists is that the microdistribution of prey, the microturbulence of the ocean, or the retention conditions are normally not suited to allow strong year classes of fish to develop. In most years more than 99% of herring larvae do not survive. Occasionally however, physical and biotic conditions are favorable, larval survival is high, and large year-classes result. Research work at the ATOLL investigated the effects of small-scale dynamics on fish feeding and predator avoidance and their correlation to year-class strength.

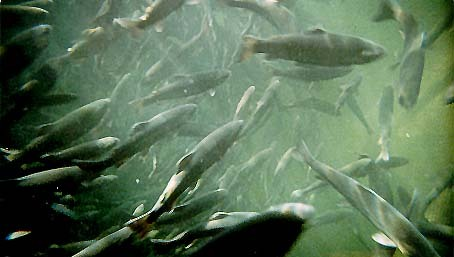
View out of one of the underwater windows into a netcage with rainbow trout

Research questions investigated by students during courses and their thesis work at the Laboratory included: What are the effects of the natural light gradient on predator-prey interactions? How can the predator best see the prey without being seen? How does the focussing of small waves oscillating light regime influence camouflage and attack strategy? What are the influences of the different frequencies of microturbulences? How do such effects change at the moment when herring larvae join into schools? What role does the phenomenon of aggregation play? Do ocean physics create or alter organism-aggregations? Can the dynamics of aggregations effect ocean physics at the microscales? Are there effects of the surface waves? What are the distribution and dynamics of microbubbles caused by turbulences and gas-oversaturations? How can the organisms orient in respect to micro-gradients of the ocean physics? How do they survive in the direct vicinity of undulating anoxia and hypoxia? Why are eelpouts, sticklebacks and herrings so extremely successful in the Baltic while cod is not? What are the effects and functions of schooling for feeding and microscale-orientation? What is the behavior of fish in netcages and how much food is lost from the cages. The ATOLL mainly served as a test bed for the development and field testing of equipment such as developing ROVs that were to be used later in Antarctic expeditions, e.g. for in situ imaging of transparent organisms of krill size under the ice.

Slow motion macrophotography video of juvenile herring feeding on copepods - the fish approach from below and catch each copepod individually. In the middle of the image a copepod escapes successfully to the left.
