= Gill hyperplasia =

Medical condition in fish

Gill hyperplasia is a medical condition consisting of the inflammation, hyperplasia, or hypertrophy of gill tissue, caused by disease, poor water quality, or injury of the gills. Gill function is often impaired, causing significant oxidative stress. Anabantiformes endure hyperplasia better than other species due to the possession of a labyrinth organ. Gill hyperplasia is frequently accompanied with symptoms including lethargy, lack of appetite, and floating near inlets. Secondary bacterial infections and septicemia may occur as a result of deterioration in respiratory function.

== Causes ==
Chronic irritation of the gills is the primary cause of gill hyperplasia. Continuous ammonia nitrogen exposure has been found to lead to a substantial increase in cases, as well as exposure to heavy metals, and injury to the gills. Some parasitic, protozoan, and bacterial species may also cause gill hyperplasia.

Visual of hyperplasia and hypertrophy

Infections known to cause gill hyperplasia listed below

- Chilodonella
- Trichodina
- Amyloodinium
- Ichthyobodo necator (formerly known as Costia necatrix)
- Ichthyophthirius multifiliis
- Gill flukes

== Treatment ==
Treatment of severe cases is difficult, and often unreliable, though a mild to moderate case may be cured. The first and most essential step to the treatment of gill hyperplasia is to deal with the underlying cause (some of which listed above). Additional oxygen and aquarium salt may also help with recovery.
