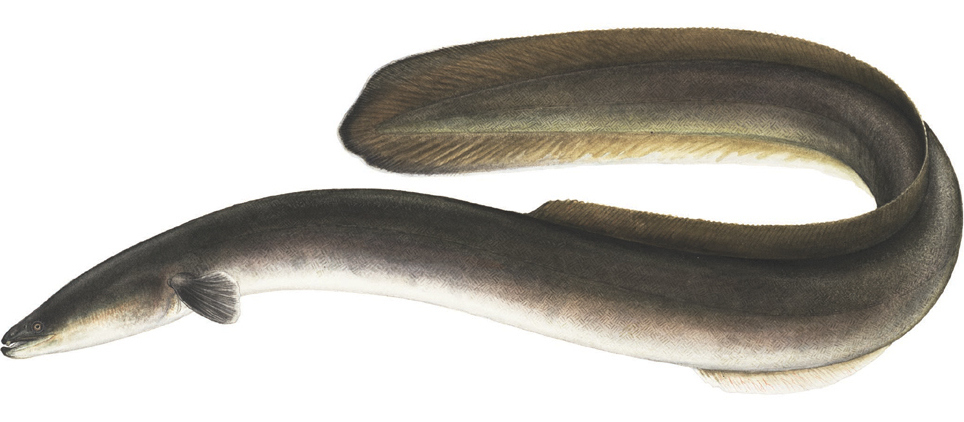

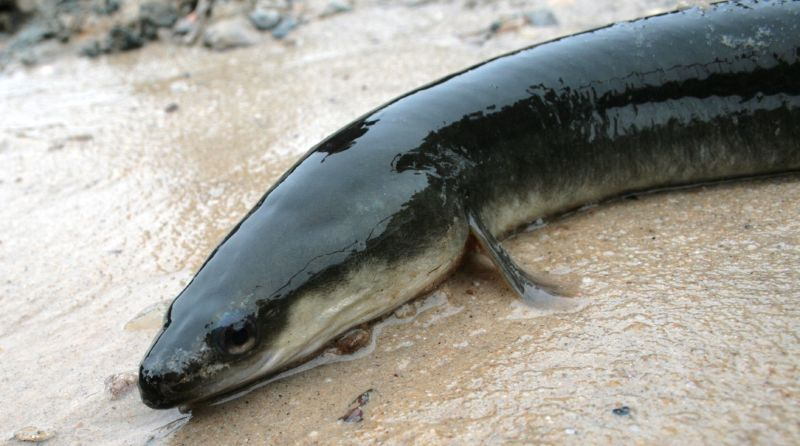

Conservation status
- Endangered (IUCN 3.1)

- Apparently Secure (NatureServe)

Scientific classification
- Kingdom: Animalia
- Phylum: Chordata
- Class: Actinopterygii
- Division: Teleostei
- Order: Anguilliformes
- Family: Anguillidae
- Genus: Anguilla
- Species: A. rostrata

Binomial name
- Anguilla rostrata Lesueur, 1821
- Range map

Synonyms
- Leptocephalus grassii

= American eel =

Species of fish

The American eel (Anguilla rostrata) is a facultative catadromous eel found on the eastern coast of North America. Freshwater eels are fish belonging to the elopomorph superorder, a group of phylogenetically ancient teleosts. The American eel has a slender, supple, snake-like body that is covered with a mucus layer, which makes the eel appear to be naked and slimy despite the presence of minute scales. A long dorsal fin runs from the middle of the back and is continuous with a similar ventral fin. Pelvic fins are absent, and relatively small pectoral fins can be found near the midline, followed by the head and gill covers. Variations exist in coloration, from olive green, brown shading to greenish-yellow and light gray or white on the belly. Eels from clear water are often lighter than those from dark, tannic acid streams.

The eel lives in fresh water and estuaries and only leaves these habitats to enter the Atlantic Ocean to make its spawning migration to the Sargasso Sea. Spawning takes place far offshore, where the eggs hatch. The female can lay up to 4 million buoyant eggs and dies after egg-laying. After the eggs hatch and the early-stage larvae develop into leptocephali, the young eels move toward North America, where they metamorphose into glass eels and enter freshwater systems where they grow as yellow eels until they begin to mature.

The American eel is found along the Atlantic coast including the tributaries of the Chesapeake Bay, the Delaware River, and the Hudson River, and as far north as the Saint Lawrence River. It is also present in the river systems of the eastern Gulf of Mexico and in some areas further south. Like all anguillid eels, American eels hunt predominantly at night, and during the day they hide in mud, sand, or gravel very close to shore, at depths of roughly 5–6 feet (1.5–1.8 m). They feed on crustaceans, aquatic insects, small insects, and probably any aquatic organisms that they can find and eat.

Eels were once an abundant species in rivers and were an important fishery for aboriginal people. The construction of hydroelectric dams has blocked their migrations and locally extirpated eels in many watersheds. For example, in Canada, the vast numbers of eels in the St. Lawrence and Ottawa Rivers have dwindled.

== Description ==
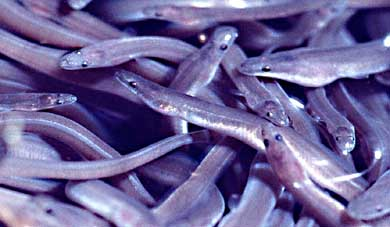
Juvenile eels

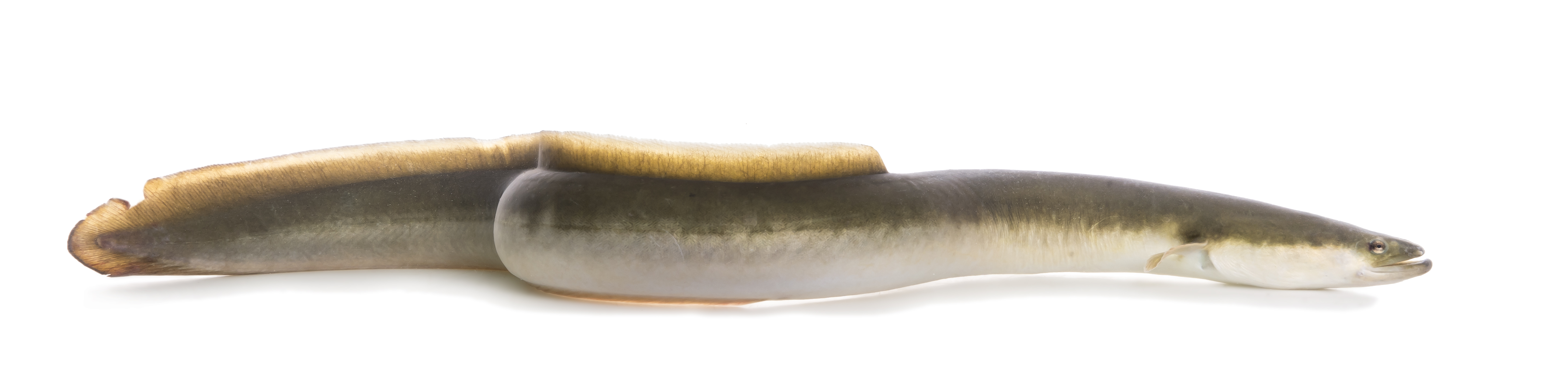
30"-long American eel captured from the Missouri River near Yankton, SD

American eels can grow to 1.22 m (4.0 ft) in length and to 7.5 kg (17 lb) in weight. Females are generally larger than males, lighter in color, with smaller eyes and higher fins. The body is elongate and snake-like. Its dorsal and anal fins are confluent with the rudimentary caudal fin. It lacks ventral fins but pectoral fins are present. The lateral line is well-developed and complete. The head is long and conical, with rather small, well-developed eyes. The mouth is terminal with jaws that are not particularly elongated. The teeth are small, pectinate or setiform in several series on the jaws and the vomer. Minute teeth also present on the pharyngeal bones, forming a patch on the upper pharyngeals. Tongue present with thick lips that are attached by a frenum in front. Nostrils are superior and well separated. Gill openings are partly below pectoral fins, relatively well-developed and well separated from one another. Inner gill slits are wide.

The scales are small, rudimentary, cycloid, relatively well embedded below the epidermis and therefore often difficult to see without magnification. The scales are not arranged in overlapping rows as they often are in other fish species but are rather irregular, in some places distributed like "parquet flooring". In general, one row of scales lies at right angle to the next, although the rows immediately above and below the lateral line lie at an angle of approximately 45°. Unlike other bony fishes, the first scales do not develop immediately after the larval stage but appear much later on.

Several morphological features distinguish the American eel from other eel species. Three morphological characteristics persist through all stages from larvae to maturing eels: the total number of vertebrae (mean 107.2), the number of myomeres (mean 108.2), and the distance between the origin of the dorsal fin to the anus (mean 9.1% of total length).

== Distribution and natural habitat ==
=== Geographic range ===
The distribution of the American eel encompasses all accessible freshwater (streams and lakes), estuaries and coastal marine waters across a latitudinal range of 5 to 62 N. Their natural range includes the western North Atlantic Ocean coastline from Venezuela to Greenland and including Iceland. Inland, this species extends into the Great Lakes and the Mississippi River and its tributaries as far upstream as Minnesota and Wisconsin.

Nonindigenous occurrences of this species in the United States were recorded from Lake Mead on the Colorado River and on the Arizona border. It was stocked on a few occasions in Sacramento and San Francisco Bay, California, in the late 1800s. No apparent evidence of survival on these occasions was noted. It was also stocked and unintentionally introduced in various states, including Illinois, Indiana, Nebraska, Nevada, North Carolina, Ohio and Pennsylvania. Stockings of this species also occurred in Utah in the late 1800s, but soon disappeared.

=== Natural habitat ===
American eel in Long Pond, Littleton, Massachusetts, in 2021

Eels are bottom dwellers. They hide in burrows, tubes, snags, masses of plants, other types of shelters. They are found in a variety of habitats including streams, rivers, and muddy or silt-bottomed lakes during their freshwater stage, as well as oceanic waters, coastal bays and estuaries. Individuals during the continental stage occasionally migrate between fresh, salt and brackish water habitats and have varying degrees of residence time in each. During winter, eels burrow under the mud and enter a state of torpor at temperatures below 5 °C (41 °F), although they may occasionally be active during this period.

American eels move from freshwater to estuaries and coastal bays to feed during spring, then either a return during the fall to overwinter (juvenile and immature adults), or a southward migration to the spawning grounds (silver eels). Continental phase eels appear highly plastic in habitat use. Eels are extremely mobile and may access habitats that appear unavailable to them, using small watercourses or moving through wet grasses. Small eels (<100 mm total length) are able to climb and may succeed in passing over vertical barriers. Habitat availability may be reduced by factors such as habitat deterioration, barriers to upstream migration (larger eels), and barriers (i.e. turbines) to downstream migration that can result in mortality.

== Life cycle ==
The American eel's life cycle begins far offshore in the Sargasso Sea in a semelparous and panmictic reproduction. In 1926 Marie Poland Fish described the collection of eggs that she observed hatch into eels, which she expanded in her taxonomic description of the larval egg development. From there, young eels drift with ocean currents and then migrate inland into streams, rivers and lakes. This journey may take many years to complete with some eels traveling as far as 6,000 kilometers. After reaching these freshwater bodies, they feed and mature for approximately 10 to 25 years before migrating back to the Sargasso Sea in order to complete their life cycle.

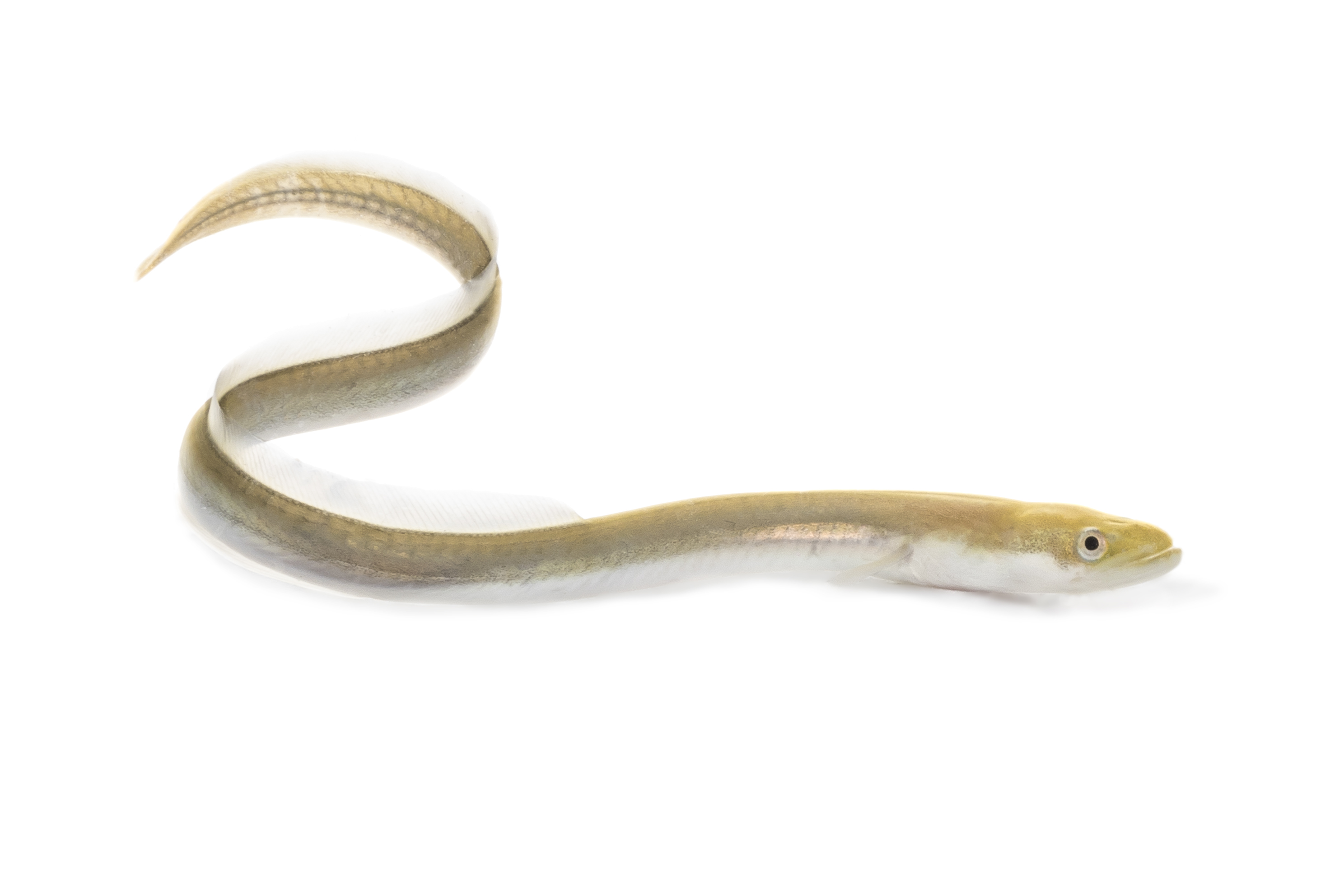
Juvenile

The eggs hatch within a week of deposition in the Sargasso Sea. Fecundity for many eels is between about 0.5 to 4.0 million eggs, with larger individuals releasing as many as 8.5 million eggs. The leptocephalus is the larval form of the eel. Leptocephali are transparent with a small, pointed head and large teeth. The laterally compressed larvae are passively transported west and north to the coastal waters on the eastern coast of North America, by the surface currents of the Gulf Stream system, a journey that will last between 7 and 12 months. As they enter the continental shelf, leptocephali metamorphose into glass eels (juveniles), which are transparent and possess the typical elongate and serpentine eel shape. The term glass eel refers to all developmental stages between the end of metamorphosis and full pigmentation. Glass eels become progressively pigmented as they approach the shore; these eels are termed elvers. The melanic pigmentation process occurs when the young eels are in coastal waters. At this phase of the life cycle, the eel is still sexually undifferentiated. The elver stage lasts about three to twelve months. Elvers that enter fresh water may spend much of this period migrating upstream. Elver influx is linked to increased temperature and reduced flow early in the migration season, and to tidal cycle influence later on.

The sexually immature adult stage of American eel is called the yellow eel. As the maturation process proceeds, the yellow eel metamorphoses into a silver eel. The silvering metamorphosis results in morphological and physiological modifications that prepare the animal to migrate back to the Sargasso Sea. The eel acquires a greyish colour with a whitish or cream coloration ventrally. The digestive tract degenerates, the pectoral fins enlarge to improve swimming capacity, eye diameter expands and visual pigments in the retina adapt to the oceanic environment, and the integument thickens.

== Feeding ==
Eels are nocturnal and most of their feeding therefore occurs at night. Having a keen sense of smell, eels most likely depend on scent to find food. The American eel is a generalist species which colonizes a wide range of habitats. Their diet is therefore extremely diverse and includes most of the aquatic animals sharing the same environment. The American eel feeds on a variety of things such as worms, small fish, clams and other mollusks, crustaceans such as soft-shelled crabs and a lot of macroinvertebrate insects. A study on gastric examination of eels revealed that "macroinvertebrates, predominantly of the Class Insecta, were eaten by 169 eels (99% of feeding eels)" and "the stonefly Acroneuria was the single most numerically dominant taxon observed in the diet, occurring in 67% of eel stomachs that contained food".

The yellow eel is essentially a nocturnal benthic omnivore. Prey includes fishes, molluscs, bivalves, crustaceans, insect larvae, surface-dwelling insects, worms, frogs and plants. The eel prefers small prey animals which can easily be attacked. Food type varies with body size. Stomachs of eels less than 40 cm and captured in streams contained mainly aquatic insect larvae, whereas larger eels fed predominantly on fishes and crayfishes. Insect abundance decreased in larger eels. The eel diet adapts to seasonal changes and the immediate environment. Feeding activity decreases or stops during the winter, and food intake ceases as eels physiologically prepare for the spawning migration.

=== Predation ===
Little information about predation on eels has been published. It was reported that elvers and small yellow eels are prey of largemouth bass and striped bass, although they were not a major parts of these predators' diet. Leptocephali, glass eels, elvers, and small yellow eels are likely to be eaten by various predatory fishes. Older eels are also known to eat incoming glass eels. They also fall prey to other species of eels, bald eagles, gulls, as well as other fish-eating birds. American eels also make up the entirety of the diet of adult rainbow snakes, lending the species one of their common names: eel moccasin.

== Commercial fisheries ==
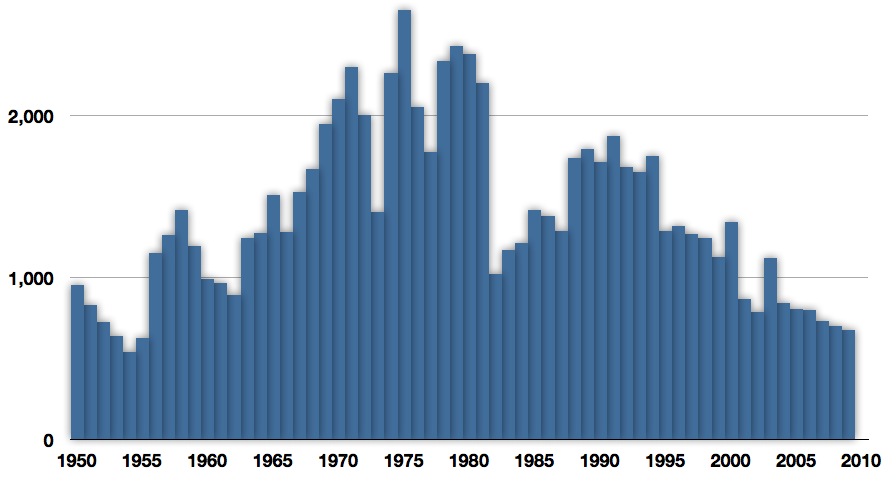
Global capture of American eel in tonnes reported by the FAO, 1950–2009

The major outlet for US landings of yellow and silver eels is the EU market.

During the 1980s and early 1990s, the American eel was one of the top three species in commercial value to Ontario's fishing industry. At its peak, the eel harvest was valued at $600,000 and, in some years, eel accounted for almost half of the value of the entire commercial fish harvest from Lake Ontario. The commercial catch of American eel has declined from approximately 223,000 kilograms (kg) in the early 1980s to 11,000 kg in 2002.

== Conservation ==
According to the International Union for Conservation of Nature, the American eel is at very high risk of extinction in the wild.

Despite being able to live in a wide range of temperatures and different levels of salinity, American eels are very sensitive to low dissolved oxygen level, which is typically found below dams. Contaminations of heavy metals, dioxins, chlordane, and polychlorinated biphenyls as well as pollutants from nonpoint source can bioaccumulate within the fat tissues of the eels, causing dangerous toxicity and reduced productivity.

The U.S. Fish and Wildlife Service reviewed the status of the American eel both in 2007 and in 2015, finding both times that Endangered Species Act protection for the American eel is not warranted. The Canadian province of Ontario has cancelled the commercial fishing quota since 2004. Eel sport fishery has been closed. Efforts have been made to improve the passage in which eels migrate across the hydroelectric dams on St. Lawrence River.

As of August 2023, A. rostrata is under consideration for protection under the Canadian Species at Risk Act. The Committee on the Status of Endangered Wildlife in Canada reported that the species was threatened in 2012. On December 2, 2025, the government of Canada chose not to list the American eel on the Species at Risk registry, finding that "the population's abundance across Canada has remained stable over the past two decades."

To help A. rostrata migrate safely, scientists are working on LED lights specifically designed to drive the eels away from dangerous obstacles or paths in their migration routes, such as hydro-electric facilities. In 2010, Greenpeace International has added the American eel to its seafood red list.

== See also ==
- Eel life history
