= EcoSCOPE =

Video (50%, looping, each image shifted to compensate the rolling microturbulences from the waves) of feeding juvenile herring (38 mm) on copepods - the fish approach from below and catch each copepod individually. In the middle of the image a copepod escapes successfully to the left.

The ecoSCOPE is an optical sensor system, deployed from a small remotely operated vehicle (ROV) or fibre optic cable, to investigate behavior and microdistribution of small organisms in the ocean.

== Deployment ==
Although an ROV may be very small and quiet, it is impossible to approach feeding herring closer than 40 cm. The ecoSCOPE allows observation of feeding herring from a distance of only 4 cm. From 40 cm, the herrings' prey (copepods) in front of the herring are invisible due to the deflection of light by phytoplankton and microparticles in highly productive waters where herring live. With the ecoSCOPE, the predators are illuminated by natural light, the prey by a light sheet, projected via a second endoscope from strobed LEDs (2 ms, 100% relative intensity at 700 nm, 53% at 690 nm, 22% at 680 nm, 4% at 660 nm, 0% at 642 nm).

By imitating the long, thin snout of the garfish protruding into the security sphere of the alert herrings, an endoscope with a tip diameter of 11 mm is used. The endoscope is camouflaged to reduce the brightness-contrast against the background: the top is black and the sides are silvery. Additionally, the front of the ROV is covered by a mirror, reflecting a light gradient resembling the natural scene and making the instrument body virtually invisible to the animals. A second sensor images other copepods, phytoplankton and particles at very high magnification. Another advantage of these small "optical probes" is the minimal disruption of the current-field in the measuring volume, allowing for less disturbed surveys of microturbulence and shear.

Another video can be seen in the article for Atlantic herring.

An ecoSCOPE was also deployed to measure the dynamics of particles in a polluted estuary: see image on Particle (ecology), another as an underwater environmental monitoring system, utilizing the orientation capacity of juvenile glass eels.

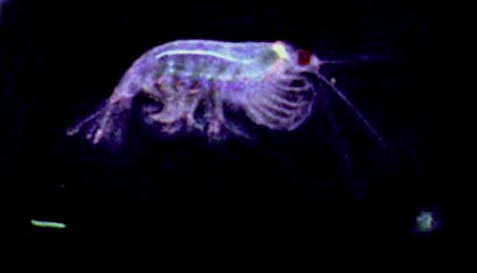
In situ image of feeding Antarctic krill. Visible is a green spit ball and a green fecal string, important components of the biological pump.

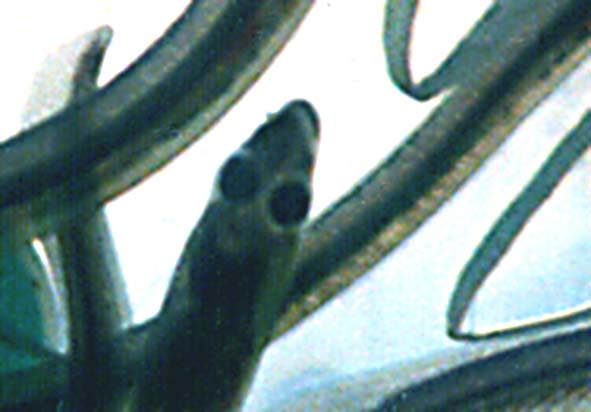
The little tube extending from the nose is visible

Filter feeding of Antarctic krill, slowed to 1/12th of actual speed

== Specifications ==
The ecoSCOPE is a product of the new initiative of "Ocean Online Biosensors": a synthesis of IT-sensoric and the sensing capability of ocean organisms.

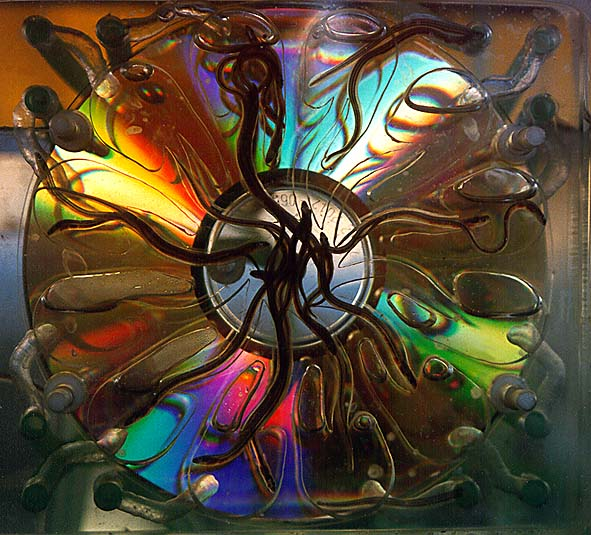
The twelve exits on the sides and the entrance in the middle, in front of a CD for comparison

Depicted in the image on the right is the central unit. On all four corners are small entrances, through which water from different sources enters (in this case, rivers and creeks in New Jersey). It flows through a small labyrinth and mixes in the central chamber. It exits through a small tube in the middle. The glass eels migrate through this small tube heading into the current. In the middle is the entrance for the eels. They test the different water qualities and migrate toward the corner, where they exit.

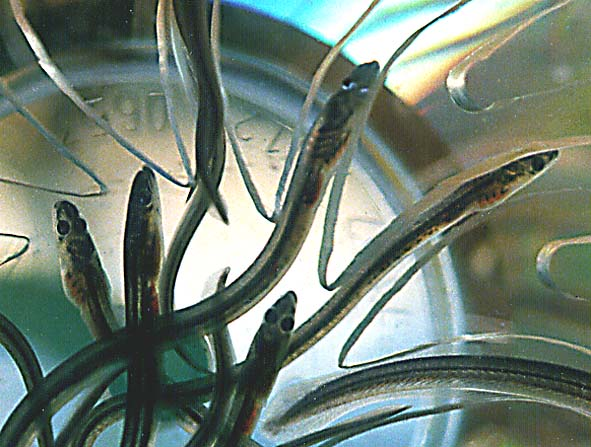
Detail of the mixing chamber - Closeup on the migrating glass eels. Visible through the transparent skin are the gills and the heart

Eels have a highly developed sense of smell. They can detect concentrations as low as one part in 19 trillion. This concentration has been compared to one glass of alcohol dispersed throughout the water of the Great Lakes. No revision without a reliable source supporting the comparison.

The system is submerged, and a digital camera observes the exits. The dynIMAGE software monitors the frequency of decisions per exit. Many thousands of glass eels pass through the system on a single day. The three exits in the left lower corner carry water from polluted sources (one is a drinking water reservoir).

EcoSCOPE systems have already been tracking water pollution and its effect on fish and plankton behavior in Europe and the United States). For the future it is anticipated to deploy ecoSCOPEs continuously online, within the project LEO Projekt of New York City, visible for the public. Tests have also been performed with different qualities of drinking water and with solutions of runoff juice from different samples of fish.

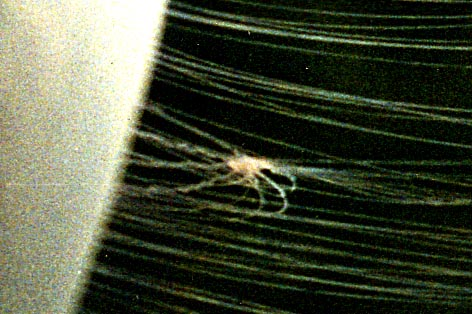
In situ image of the fibres of an Aurelia aurita from the Baltic Sea showing a prey item, probably a copepod pulled to the body by contracting the fibres in a corkscrew fashion.

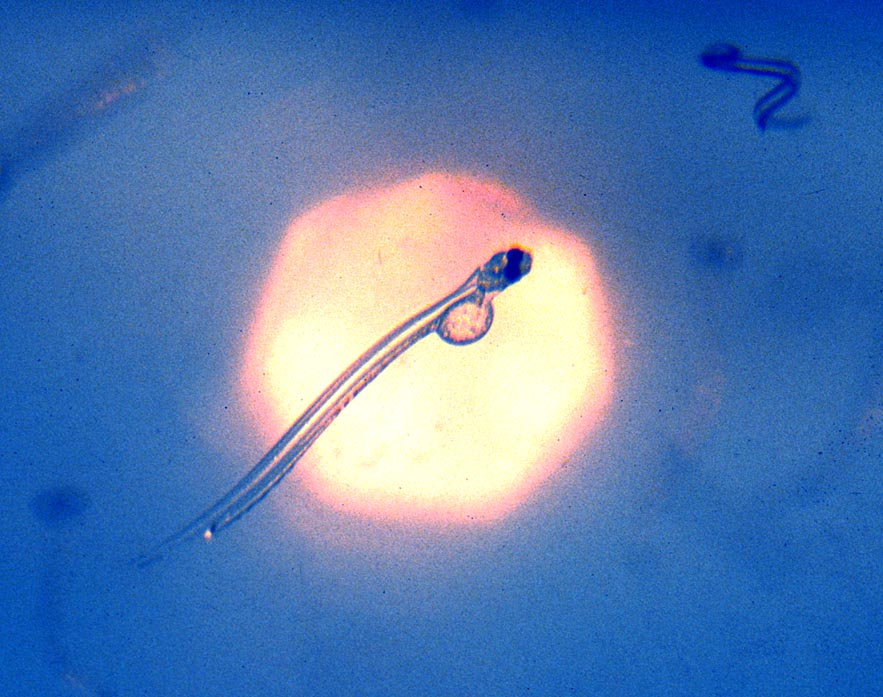
Very young larvae of Atlantic herring in the typical oblique swimming position - the animal in the upper right in the classical S-shape of the beginning phase of an attack of probably a copepod - the remains of the yolk is very well visible in the transparent animal in the middle

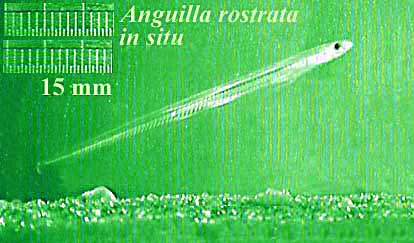
Glass eel on the online in situ microscope at the LEO project.

Glass eel at the transition from ocean to freshwater; the freshwater flows from the left to the right. Glass eels are extremely difficult to image because they are transparent; see eel life history.

== See also ==
- American eel
- Eel life history
