= Particle (ecology) =

Small object in marine or freshwater

In marine and freshwater ecology, a particle is a small object. Particles can remain in suspension in the ocean or freshwater. However, they eventually settle (rate determined by Stokes' law) and accumulate as sediment. Some can enter the atmosphere through wave action where they can act as cloud condensation nuclei (CCN). Many organisms filter particles out of the water with unique filtration mechanisms (filter feeders). Particles are often associated with high loads of toxins which attach to the surface. As these toxins are passed up the food chain they accumulate in fatty tissue and become increasingly concentrated in predators (see bioaccumulation). Very little is known about the dynamics of particles, especially when they are re-suspended by dredging. They can remain floating in the water and drift over long distances. The decomposition of some particles by bacteria consumes much oxygen and can cause the water to become hypoxic.

== Particle analysis ==
Particle levels in water (or air) can be measured with a turbidity meter and analyzed with a particle counter. They can also be scanned with an underwater microscope, such as ecoSCOPE.

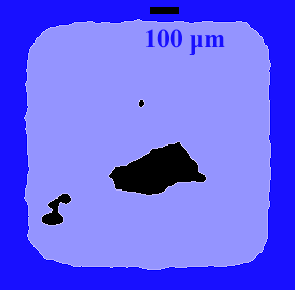
Particles scanned with the ecoSCOPE microscope. The blue frame is a 1 mm contrast grid.

== Contaminant kinetics ==
It takes a few days until plankton organisms have filtered the particles and incorporated the toxins into their body fat and tissue: In the southwards flow of the waters of the Hudson off the coast of New Jersey, the highest levels of mercury in copepods have not been found directly in front of the river off New York but 150 km south, off Atlantic City.

Many copepods are then captured by mysidae, krill and smallest fish like the juveniles of atlantic herring - and in each step of the foodchain the toxin concentrations increase by the factor of 10.

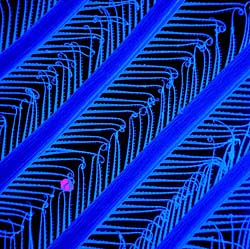
Filter of krill

Filter of krill: The first degree filter setae carry in v-form two rows of second degree setae, pointing towards the inside of the feeding basket. The purple ball is one micrometer in size. To display the total area of this fascinating particle filtration structure one would have to tile 7500 times this image.

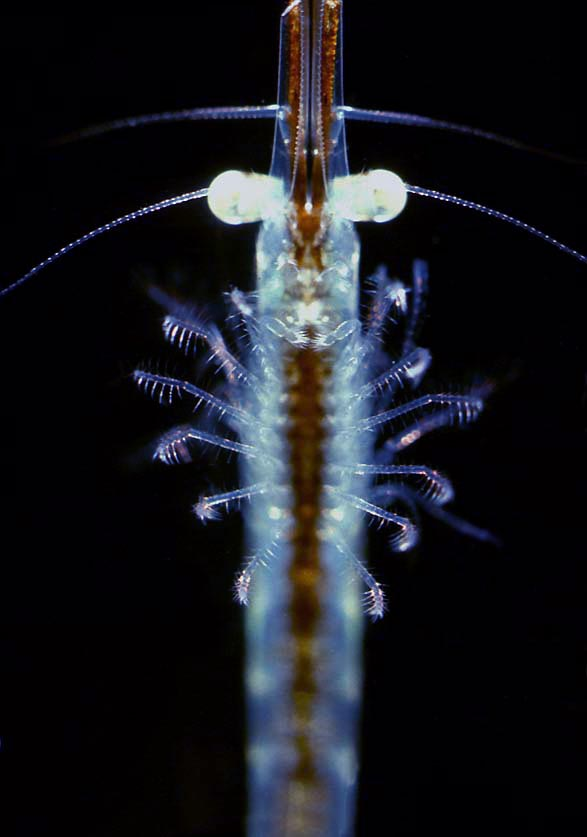
Filter basket of a mysid.

Filter basket of a mysid. These 3 cm long animals live close to shore and hover above the sea floor, constantly collecting particles. Mysids are an important food source for herring, cod, flounder, striped bass. In polluted areas they have high toxin levels in their tissue but they are very robust and require much poison to die.
