= Lough Craghy =

Lake in County Donegal, Ireland

- Loch Chrathaí (Irish)
- Location in Ireland
- Location: County Donegal
- Coordinates: 54°57′7″N 8°19′6″W
- Primary outflows: Dunglow Lough
- Catchment area: 25.22 km^{2} (9.7 sq mi)
- Basin countries: Ireland
- Max. length: 1.4 km (1 mi)
- Max. width: 0.8 km (0.5 mi)
- Surface area: 0.50 km^{2} (0.19 sq mi)
- Surface elevation: 14 m (46 ft)

Lough Craghy (Irish: Loch Chrathaí), also locally known as Tully Lake, is a freshwater lake in the northwest of Ireland. It is located in north County Donegal in the Rosses fishery.

== Geography and hydrology ==
Lough Craghy is 3 kilometres (2 mi) east of Dungloe. The lake drains westwards into Dunglow Lough.

== Natural history ==
Fish species in Lough Craghy include sea trout. These trout are seasonal, present in summer only.

== See also ==
- List of loughs in Ireland
