= Eel life history =

Eel life cycle

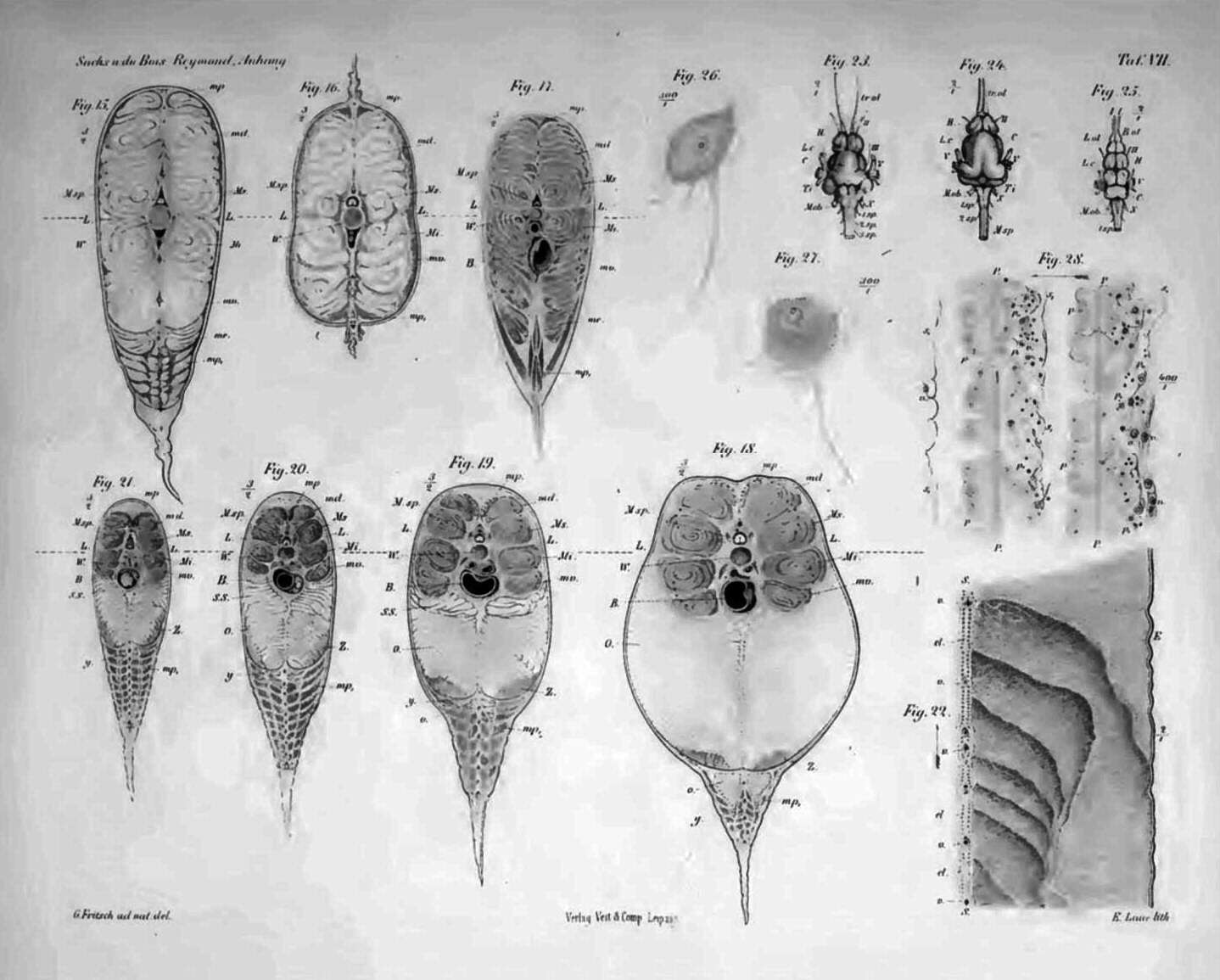
1881, An Anatomy of the Eel in search of Reproductive Organs

Eels are any of several long, thin, bony fishes of the order Anguilliformes. They have a catadromous life cycle, that is: they migrate from fresh water into the sea to spawn. Because fishermen never caught anything they recognized as juvenile eels, the life cycle of the eel was long a mystery. Of particular interest has been the search for the spawning grounds for the various species of eels, and identifying the population impacts of different stages of the life cycle.

== Past studies of eels ==
The European eel (Anguilla anguilla) is the species most familiar to Western scientists, beginning with Aristotle, who wrote the earliest known inquiry into the natural history of eels. He speculated that they were born of "earth worms", which he believed were formed of mud, growing from the "guts of wet soil" rather than through sexual reproduction. Many centuries passed before scientists were able to demonstrate that such spontaneous generation does not occur.

In 1777, the Italian Carlo Mondini located an eel's ovaries and demonstrated that eels are a kind of fish. In 1876, while he was still a young university student in Austria, Sigmund Freud was assigned the task of searching for the male sex organs of the eels by members of the faculty supervising his studies. Having dissected hundreds of eels, he had to concede failure in his first major published research paper, and turned to other issues in frustration. 20 years later the male gonads of the eel were first observed in a specimen off the coast of Sicily.

Larval eels — transparent, leaflike two-inch (five-cm) creatures of the open ocean — were not generally recognized as eels until 1893; instead, they were thought to be a separate species, Leptocephalus brevirostris (from the Greek leptocephalus meaning "thin- or flat-head"). In 1886, however, the French zoologist Yves Delage discovered the truth when he kept leptocephali alive in a laboratory tank in Roscoff until they matured into eels, and in 1896 Italian zoologist Giovanni Battista Grassi confirmed the finding when he observed the transformation of a leptocephalus into a round glass eel in the Mediterranean Sea. (He also observed that salt water was necessary to support the maturation process.) Although the connection between larval eels and adult eels is now well understood, the term “leptocephalus” is still used to refer to a larval eel.

Typical catadromous life cycle of Anguilla eels

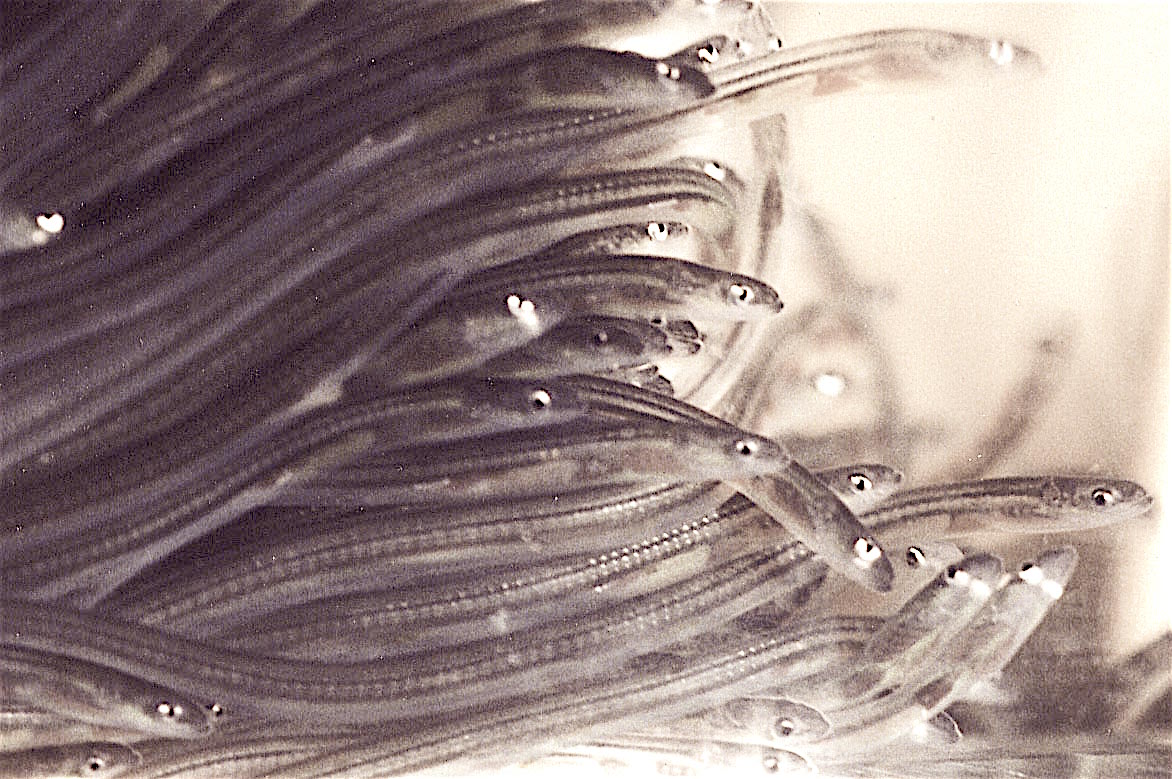
Glass eels at the transition from ocean to fresh water

Movie of migrating glass eels

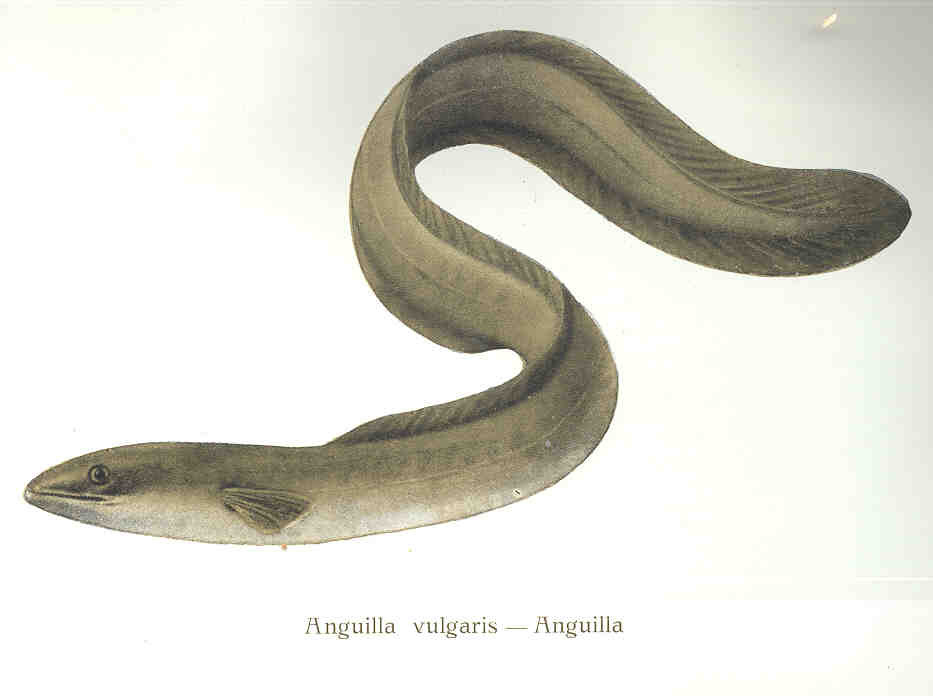
Mature silver-stage European eels migrate back to the ocean

== Search for the spawning grounds ==
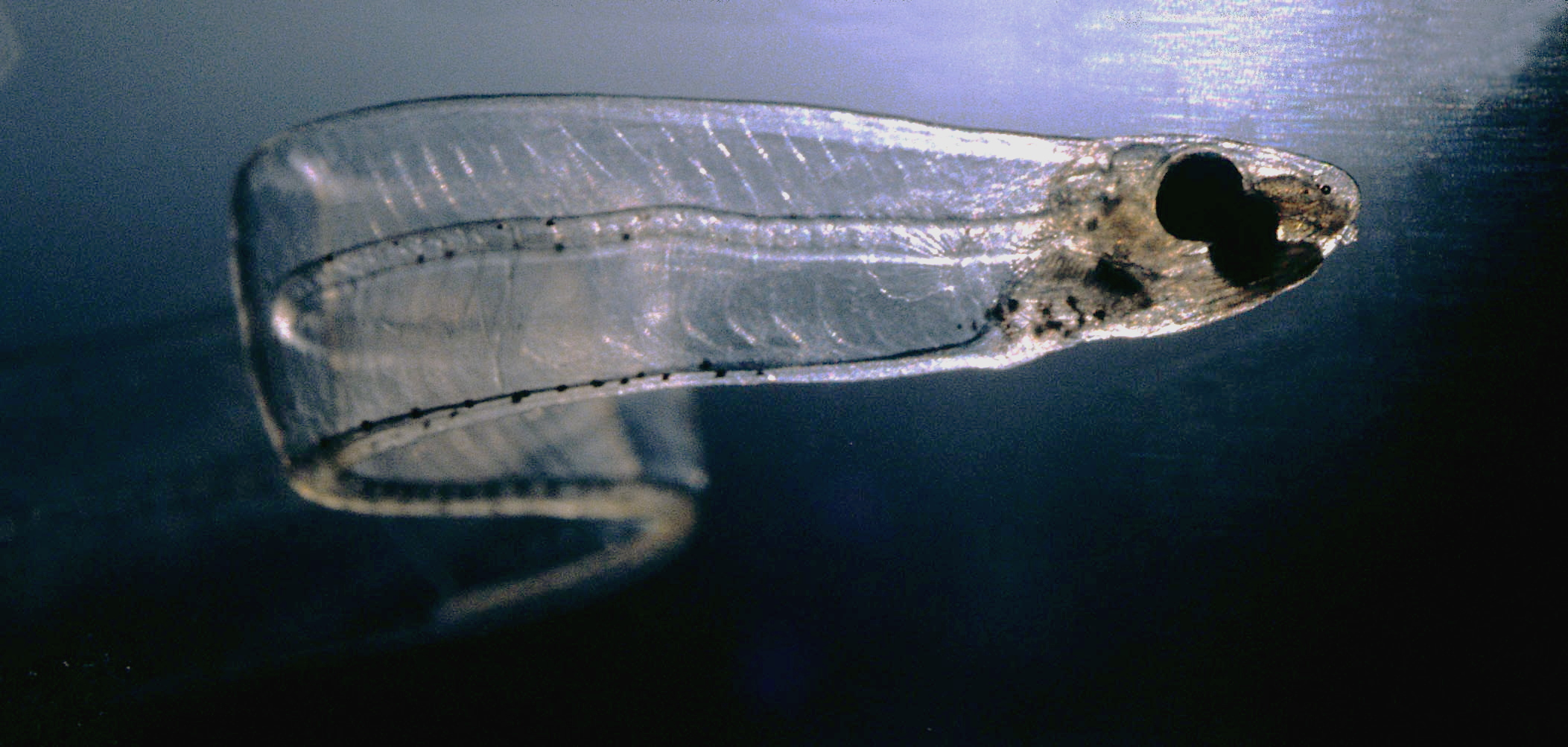
Leptocephalus larva of an ocean eel

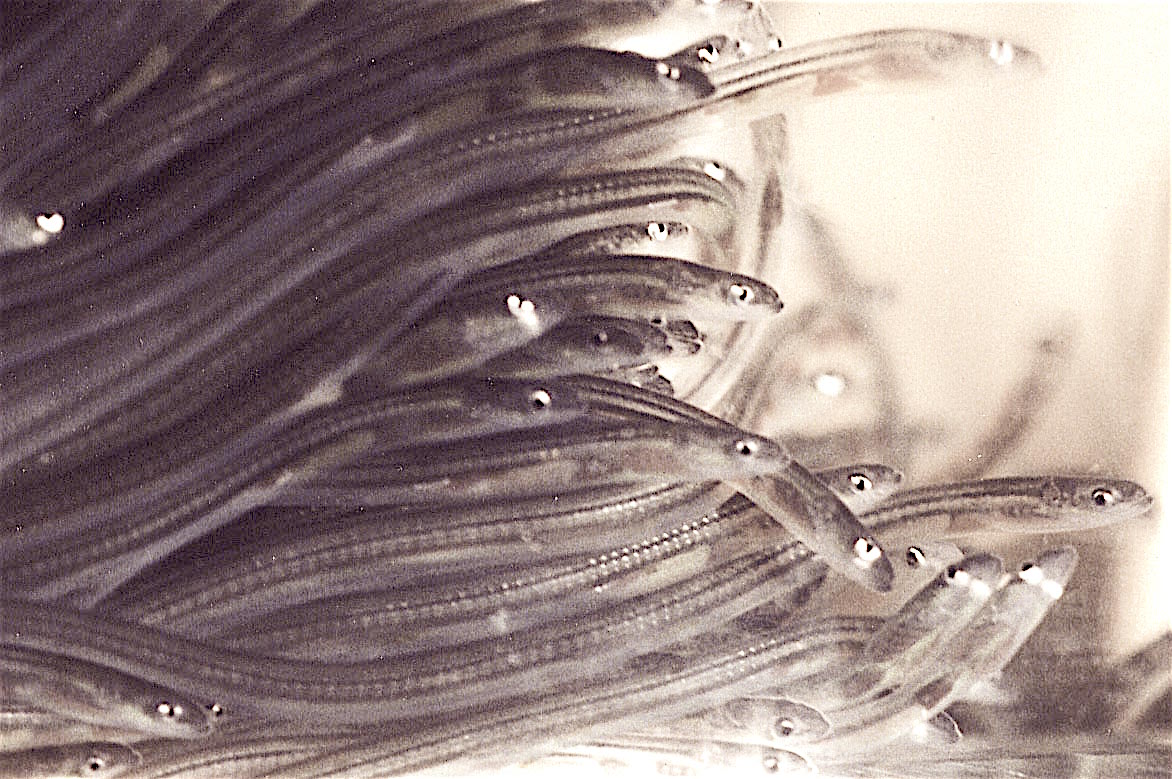
Glass eels at the transition between ocean and fresh water; the skin is still transparent and the red gills and the heart are visible; length about 8 cm

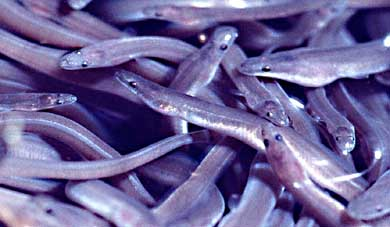
Juvenile eels, length about 25 cm

=== European eel ===
The Danish professor Johannes Schmidt, beginning in 1904, led a series of expeditions into the Mediterranean Sea and the North Atlantic (the Dana expeditions) to investigate eels. The expeditions were largely financed by the Carlsberg Foundation. He noted that all the leptocephali he found were very similar, and hypothesized that they all must have descended from a common ancestor. He also observed that the farther out to sea in the Atlantic Ocean he went, the smaller the leptocephali were. In a 1922 expedition, he sailed as far as the Sargasso Sea, south of Bermuda, where he caught the smallest eel-larvae that had ever been seen. Although Schmidt did not directly observe eel spawning, or even find ready-to-spawn adult eels, he deduced the following about the life history of the eel, based on the size distribution of the leptocephali he collected: The larvae of European eels travel with the Gulf Stream across the Atlantic Ocean from the Sargasso Sea, and grow to 75–90 mm within one to three years, before they reach the coasts of Europe. Marine eels of the order Anguilliformes also have a leptocephalus stage, and likely pass through a stage similar to the anguillid glass eels, but they are rarely seen in the ocean.

Eels in this so-called "recruitment" developmental stage are known as glass eels because of the transparency of their bodies. The term typically refers to a transparent eel of the family Anguillidae. It is applied to an intermediary stage in the eel's complex life history between the leptocephalus stage and the juvenile (elver) stage. Glass eels are defined as "all developmental stages from completion of leptocephalus metamorphosis until full pigmentation". Once the glass eels arrive at coastal areas, they migrate up rivers and streams, overcoming various natural and man-made challenges — sometimes by piling up their bodies by the tens of thousands to climb over obstacles— and they reach even the smallest of creeks. At this stage in their growth they are small enough to benefit from surface tension in order to climb vertical walls.

In fresh water they develop pigmentation, turn into elvers (young eels), and feed on creatures such as small crustaceans, worms, and insects. For 10 to 14 years they mature, growing to a length of 60 to 80 cm. The eels can propel themselves over wet grass and dig through wet sand to reach upstream headwaters and ponds, thus colonizing the continent. During this stage they are called yellow eels because of their golden pigmentation.

In July, some mature individuals migrate back towards the sea, sometimes crossing wet grasslands at night to reach rivers that lead to the sea. Eel migrations out of their freshwater growth habitats from various parts of Europe, or through the Baltic Sea in the Danish straits, have been the basis of traditional fisheries with characteristic trapnets.

Details of the adults' migration across 6,000 km (3,700 mi) open ocean journey back to their spawning grounds north of the Antilles, Haiti, and Puerto Rico remain poorly understood. By the time they leave Europe, their gut dissolves, making feeding impossible, so they have to rely on stored energy alone. The external features undergo other dramatic changes, as well: the eyes start to enlarge, the eye pigments change for optimal vision in dim blue clear ocean light, and the sides of their bodies turn silvery, to create a countershading pattern which makes them difficult to see by predators during their long open-ocean migration. These migrating eels are typically called "silver eels" or "big eyes".

German fisheries biologist Friedrich Wilhelm Tesch conducted many expeditions with high-tech instrumentation to follow eel migration, first down the Baltic, then along the coasts of Norway and England, but finally the transmitter signals were lost at the continental shelf when the batteries ran out. According to Schmidt, a travel speed in the ocean of 15 km per day can be assumed, so a silver eel would need around 140 to 150 days to reach the Sargasso Sea from Scotland and about 165 to 175 days when leaving from the English Channel.

Tesch — like Schmidt — kept trying to persuade sponsors to provide more funding for expeditions. His proposal was to release 50 silver eels from Danish waters, with transmitters that would detach from the eels each second day, float up toward the surface, and broadcast their position, depth, and temperature to satellite receivers. He also suggested that countries on the western side of the Atlantic could perform a similar release experiment at the same time. In December 2018 researchers in the Azores, (about 1,400 km (870 mi) west of the Iberian coast—the furthest point on the migration route identified in previous experiments) fitted 26 large female European eels with satellite tags and released them into the Atlantic Ocean. Tracking demonstrated that the fishes' journey to the Sargasso took a further year, or more.

=== American eel ===
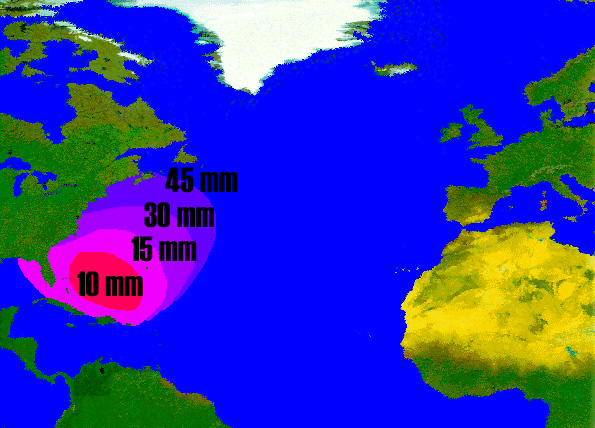
Distribution and size of leptocephali larvae of the American eel, Anguilla rostrata

Another Atlantic eel species is known: the American eel, Anguilla rostrata. First it was believed European and American eels were the same species due to their similar appearance and behavior, but they differ in chromosome count and various molecular genetic markers, and in the number of vertebrae, A. anguilla counting 110 to 119 and A. rostrata 103 to 110.

The spawning grounds for the two species are in an overlapping area of the southern Sargasso Sea, with A. rostrata apparently being more westward than A. anguilla. This was confirmed in 2023. After spawning in the Sargasso Sea and moving to the west, the leptocephali of the American eel exit the Gulf Stream earlier than the European eel and begin migrating into the estuaries along the east coast of North America between February and late April at an age around one year and a length around 60 mm.

=== Japanese eel ===
The spawning area of the Japanese eel, Anguilla japonica, has also been found. Their breeding site is to the west of the Suruga seamount (14–17°N, 142–143°E), near the Mariana Islands. and their leptocephali are then transported to the west to East Asia by the North Equatorial Current.

In June and August 2008, Japanese scientists discovered and caught matured adult eels of A. japonica and A. marmorata in the West Mariana Ridge.

=== Southern African eels ===
Southern Africa's four species of freshwater eels (A. mossambica, A. bicolor bicolor, A. bengalensis labiata, and A. marmorata) have an interesting migratory pattern: It takes them on a long journey from their spawning grounds in the Indian Ocean north of Madagascar to high up in some of the Southern African river systems and then back again to the ocean off Madagascar.

=== New Zealand longfin eels ===
New Zealand longfin eels breed only once at the end of their lives, making a journey of thousands of kilometres from New Zealand to their spawning grounds near Tonga. Their eggs (of which each female eel produces between 1 and 20 million) are fertilized in an unknown manner, but probably in deep tropical water. The mature eels then die, their eggs floating to the surface to hatch into very flat leaf-like larvae (called leptocephalus) that then drift along large oceanic currents back to New Zealand. This drifting is thought to take up to 15 months. There have been no recorded captures of either the eggs or larvae of longfin eels.

== Decline of the glass eels ==
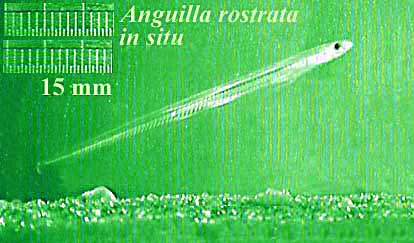
Glass eel on the online in situ microscope at the LEO project

Glass eel

For unknown reasons, beginning in the mid-1980s, glass eel arrival in the spring dropped drastically—in Germany to 10% and in France to 14% of their previous levels—from even conservative estimates. Data from Maine and other North American coasts showed similar declines, although not as drastic. Since the 1980's the population has declined by 98%.

In 1997, European demand for eels could not be met for the first time ever, and dealers from Asia bought all they could. The traditional European stocking programs could not compete any longer: each week, the price for a kilogram of glass eel went up another US$30. Even before the 1997 generation hit the coasts of Europe, dealers from China alone placed advance orders for more than 250,000 kg, some bidding more than $1,100 per kg. Asian elvers have sold in Hong Kong for as much as $5,000 to $6,000 a kilogram at times when $1,000 would buy the same amount of American glass eels at their catching sites. Such a kilogram, consisting of 5000 glass eels, may bring at least $60,000 and as much as $150,000 after they leave an Asian fish farm. In New Jersey, over 2000 licenses for glass eel catch were issued and reports of 38 kg per night and fisherman have been made, although the average catch is closer to 1 kg.

Glass eels have been harvested for food from the River Severn, England, for centuries, but for about 200 years, from the sixteenth to eighteenth century, the practice was outlawed by act of Parliament. The restriction was removed in 1873 and in 1908 a collection point and holding station for the catch was established at Epney, Gloucestershire. Initially the crop was sold for human consumption but, as infrastructure for live transport improved, the glass eels were exported throughout Europe for stocking natural waterways and to the Far East for eel aquaculture. When Britain seceded from the European Union in 2020 this trade with other European countries ceased. In 2025 exports to Russia were banned.

The demand for adult eels has continued to grow, as of 2003. Germany imported more than $50 million worth of eels in 2002. In Europe, 25 million kg are consumed each year, but in Japan alone, more than 100 million kg were consumed in 1996. As the European eels become less available, worldwide interest in American eels has increased dramatically.

New high-tech eel aquaculture plants are appearing in Asia, with possible effects on the native Japanese eel, A. japonica. Traditional eel aquaculture operations rely on wild-caught elvers, but experimental hormone treatments in Japan have led to artificially spawned eels. Eggs from these treated eels have a diameter of about 1 mm, and each female can produce up to 10 million eggs. However, these treated eels may not solve the eel crisis. Scientists are struggling to get eels to sexual maturity without environmental cues. Additionally, leptocephali (larva) require a diet of marine snow which is difficult to recreate in aquaculture.

== Threats to eels ==
Strong concerns exist that the European eel population might be devastated by a new threat: Anguillicola crassus, a foreign parasitic nematode. This parasite from East Asia (the original host is A. japonica) appeared in European eel populations in the early 1980s. Since 1995, it also appeared in the United States (Texas and South Carolina), most likely due to uncontrolled aquaculture eel shipments. In Europe, eel populations are already from 30% to 100% infected with the nematode. Recently, this parasite was shown to inhibit the function of the swimbladder as a hydrostatic organ. As open ocean voyagers, eels need the carrying capacity of the swimbladder (which makes up 3–6% of the eel's body weight) to cross the ocean on stored energy alone.

Because the eels are catadromous (living in fresh water but spawning in the sea), dams and other river obstructions can block their ability to reach inland feeding grounds. Since the 1970s, an increasing number of eel ladders have been constructed in North America and Europe to help the fish bypass obstructions.

As of the early 2000s, in New Jersey, the Long-term Ecosystem Observatory was monitoring glass eel migration with a planned online in situ microscope.

== See also ==
- Fish ladder
- Fish migration
- The Gospel of the Eels

== Sources and further reading ==
- Banks, R.C., R.W. McDiarmid, A.L. Gardner, & W.C. Starnes (2003). Checklist of Vertebrates of the United States, the U.S. Territories, and Canada.
- Bussing, W.A. (1998). Peces de las aguas continentales de Costa Rica [Freshwater fishes of Costa Rica]. 2nd ed. San José Costa Rica: Editorial de la Universidad de Costa Rica.
- Butsch, R.S. (1939). A list of Barbadian fishes. J. B.M.H.S. 7(1): pp. 17–31.
- Böhlke, J.E. & C.C.G. Chaplin (1993). Fishes of the Bahamas and adjacent tropical waters. 2nd edition. University of Texas Press, Austin.
- Claro, R. (1994). Characterísticas generales de la ictiofauna. pp. 55–70. [In] R. Claro [ed.] Ecología de los peces marinos de Cuba. Instituto de Oceanología Academia de Ciencias de Cuba and Centro de Investigaciones de Quintana Roo.
- Claro, Rodolfo, & Lynne R. Parenti (2001). Chapter 2: The Marine Ichthyofauna of Cuba. [In] Claro, Rodolfo, Kenyon C. Lindeman, & L.R. Parenti, [eds.] Ecology of the Marine Fishes of Cuba. Smithsonian Institution Press. Washington, DC, USA. pp. 21–57. ISBN 1-56098-985-8.
- Erdman, D.S. (1984). Exotic fishes in Puerto Rico. pp. 162–176. [In] W.R. Courtney, Jr. & J.R. Stauffer, Jr. [eds.] Distribution, biology and management of exotic fishes. Johns Hopkins University Press, Baltimore, USA.
- Eschmeyer, William N., [ed.] (1998). Catalog of Fishes. Special Publication of the Center for Biodiversity Research and Information, no. 1, vol 1–3. California Academy of Sciences. San Francisco, California, USA. 2905. ISBN 0-940228-47-5.
- Fish, M.P. & W.H. Mowbray (1970). Sounds of Western North Atlantic fishes. A reference file of biological underwater sounds. The Johns Hopkins Press, Baltimore, MD.
- Food and Agriculture Organization (1992). FAO yearbook 1990. Fishery statistics. Catches and landings. FAO Fish. Ser. (38). FAO Stat. Ser. 70:(105)
- Food and Agriculture Organization (1997). Aquaculture production statistics 1986–1995. FAO Fish. Circ. 815, Rev. 9.
- Greenfield, D.W & J.E Thomerson (1997). Fishes of the continental waters of Belize. University Press of Florida, Florida.
- International Game Fish Association (1991). World record game fishes. International Game Fish Association, Florida, USA.
- Jessop, B.M. (1987). Migrating American eels in Nova Scotia. Trans. Amer. Fish. Soc. 116: pp. 161–170.
- Kenny, J.S. (1995). Views from the Bridge: A memoir on the freshwater fishes of Trinidad. Julian S. Kenny, Maracas, St. Joseph, Trinidad, & Tobago.
- Lim, P., Meunier, F.J., Keith, P. & Noël, P.Y. (2002). Atlas des poissons et des crustacés d'eau douce de la Martinique. Patrimoines Naturels, 51: Paris: MNHN.
- Murdy, Edward O., Ray S. Birdsong, & John A. Musick 1997. Fishes of Chesapeake Bay. Smithsonian Institution Press. Washington, DC, USA. ISBN 1-56098-638-7.
- Nelson, Joseph S., Edwin J. Crossman, Héctor Espinosa-Pérez, Lloyd T. Findley, Carter R. Gilbert, Robert N. Lea, & James D. Williams, [eds.] (2004). Common and scientific names of fishes from the United States, Canada, and Mexico, Sixth Edition. American Fisheries Society Special Publication, no. 29. American Fisheries Society. Bethesda, Maryland, USA. ISBN 1-888569-61-1.
- Nielsen, J.G. and E. Bertelsen (1992). Fisk i grønlandske farvande. Atuakkiorfik, Nuuk. 65 s.
- Nigrelli, R.F. (1959). Longevity of fishes in captivity, with special reference to those kept in the New York Aquarium. pp. 212–230. [In] G.E.W. Wolstehnolmen & M. O'Connor [eds.] Ciba Foundation Colloquium on Ageing: the life span of animals. Vol. 5., Churchill, London.
- Ogden, J.C., J.A. Yntema, & I. Clavijo (1975). An annotated list of the fishes of St. Croix, U.S. Virgin Islands. Spec. Publ. No. 3.
- Page, L.M. & B.M. Burr (1991). A field guide to freshwater fishes of North America north of Mexico. Houghton Mifflin Company, Boston.
- Piper, R. (2007). Extraordinary Animals: An Encyclopedia of Curious and Unusual Animals, Greenwood Press.
- Robins, C.R. & G.C. Ray (1986). A field guide to Atlantic coast fishes of North America. Houghton Mifflin Company, Boston, MA
- Robins, Richard C., Reeve M. Bailey, Carl E. Bond, James R. Brooker, Ernest A. Lachner, et al. (1980). A List of Common and Scientific Names of Fishes from the United States and Canada, Fourth Edition. American Fisheries Society Special Publication, no. 12. American Fisheries Society. Bethesda, MD.
- Robins, Richard C., Reeve M. Bailey, Carl E. Bond, James R. Brooker, Ernest A. Lachner, et al. 1980. A List of Common and Scientific Names of Fishes from the United States and Canada, Fourth Edition. American Fisheries Society Special Publication, no. 12. American Fisheries Society. Bethesda, MD.
- Smith, C.L. (1997). National Audubon Society field guide to tropical marine fishes of the Caribbean, the Gulf of Mexico, Florida, the Bahamas, and Bermuda. Alfred A. Knopf, Inc., New York, NY.
- Tesch, F.-W. (2003) The eel. Blackwell Science, Oxford, UK.
- Wallace, Karen (1993) Think of an Eel, Walker Books, UK. [A picture book for children that describes the life cycle of the eel.]
- Wenner, C.A. (1978). Anguillidae. [In] W. Fischer [ed.] FAO species identification sheets for fishery purposes. West Atlantic (Fishing Area 31). volume 1. FAO, Rome, IT.
