= Leptocephalus =

Juvenile eel

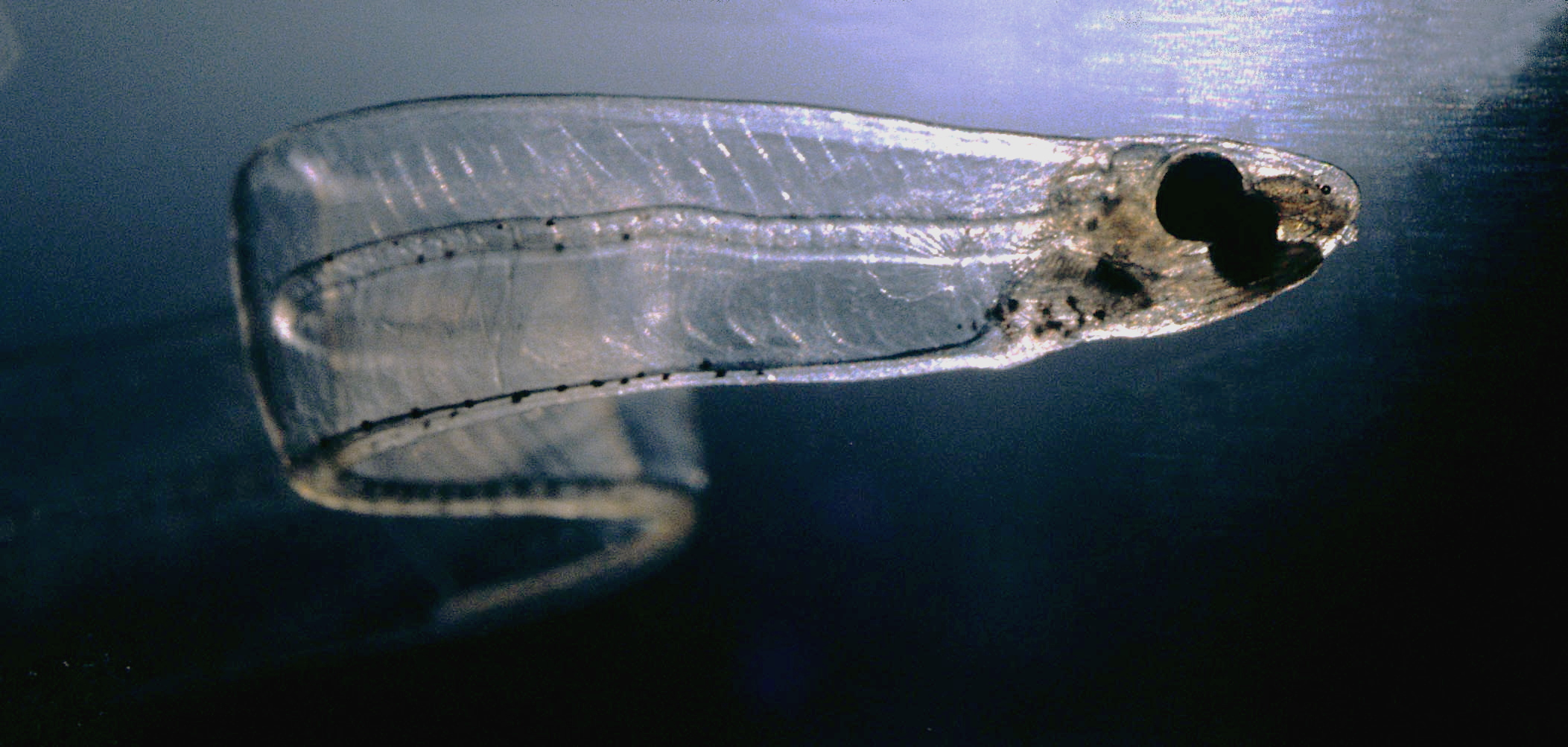
Leptocephalus larva of Conger Eels (Conger conger)

A leptocephalus (meaning "slim head") is the flat and transparent larva of eels and other members of the superorder Elopomorpha. This is one of the most diverse groups of teleosts, containing 801 species in 4 orders, 24 families, and 156 genera. This group is thought to have arisen in the Cretaceous period over 140 million years ago.

Fishes with a leptocephalus larval stage include the most familiar eels such as the conger, moray eel, and garden eel as well as members of the family Anguillidae, plus more than 10 other families of lesser-known types of marine eels. These are all true eels of the order Anguilliformes. Leptocephali of eight species of eels from the South Atlantic Ocean were described by Meyer-Rochow.

The fishes of the other four traditional orders of elopomorph fishes that have this type of larvae are more diverse in their body forms and include the tarpon, bonefish, spiny eel, pelican eel and deep sea species like Cyema atrum and Notacanthidae species, the latter with giant Leptocephalus-like larvae.

== Description ==
Leptocephali (singular leptocephalus) all have laterally compressed bodies that contain transparent jelly-like substances on the inside of the body and a thin layer of muscle with visible myomeres on the outside. Their body organs are small and they have only a simple tube for a gut. This combination of features results in them being very transparent when they are alive. Leptocephali have dorsal and anal fins confluent with caudal fins, but lack pelvic fins.

They also lack red blood cells until they begin to metamorphose into the juvenile glass eel stage when they start to look like eels. Leptocephali are also characterized by their fang-like teeth that are present until metamorphosis, when they are lost.

Leptocephali differ from most fish larvae because they grow to much larger sizes and have long larval periods of about three months to more than a year. Another distinguishing feature of these organisms is their mucinous pouch. They move with typical anguilliform swimming motions and can swim forwards and backwards. Their food source was difficult to determine because zooplankton, which are the typical food of fish larvae, were never seen in their guts.

Leptocephali appear to feed on tiny particles floating freely in the ocean, which are often referred to as marine snow. Leptocephali larvae live primarily in the upper 100 metres (330 ft) of the ocean at night, and often a little deeper during the day. Leptocephali are present worldwide in the oceans from southern temperate to tropical latitudes, where adult eels and their close relatives live. American eels, European eels, conger eels, and some oceanic species spawn and are found in the Sargasso Sea.

Leptocephalus brevirostris was described as a species in 1856, but was later found to be the larva of Anguilla anguilla, which was described by Linnaeus in 1758 and thus has priority.

== Development ==
The eggs of eels in the order Anguilliformes are quite large compared to those of many other fishes. They are about 1–4 millimetres (1,000–4,000 μm; 39–157 thou) in diameter. Once the larvae are newly hatched, the yolk extends posteriorly. Some larvae hatch with features of the head more developed than others. The preleptocephalus stage is the period immediately after the larvae hatch. During this stage, the larvae do not yet feed externally. These larvae typically have poorly developed eyes and few or no teeth.

The leptocephalus stage of the larvae begins after the nutrients from the yolk have been absorbed and the eyes and teeth are formed. At this point, the larvae usually have long forward-facing pointy teeth. As the larvae grow larger, the teeth will be replaced by shorter teeth and will increase in number. The maximum size larvae reach varies from about 5–10 centimetres (2–4 in) but can be as large as 30 centimetres (12 in) or more depending on the species. After the leptocephali have reached their maximum size, they enter their glass eel stage. Their laterally compressed bodies tend to become more rounded in this stage. The head also thickens, the olfactory organ enlarges, and their teeth are lost.

Leptocephali differ from other fish larvae in their development. In other teleosts (those without leptocephali), the egg hatches and then the larvae get nutrients from a yolk sac. Following this, external feeding begins once the yolk sac has depleted. The larvae begin to increase in size and develop into a juvenile fish once external feeding begins. In those fish with a leptocephalus stage; however, after hatching and obtaining nutrients from the yolk, the larvae do not begin external feeding. This is peculiar because the larvae still continue to grow in size. From this information, it is concluded that one of the biggest and most basic differences in the developmental cycles of teleosts without leptocephali and teleosts with leptocephali is the food source that the larvae use.

Leptocephali are poorly understood, partly because they are very fragile and eat particulate material instead of zooplankton, and their good swimming ability lets them avoid most standard-sized plankton nets used by marine biologists. A video recording of a naturally swimming leptocephalus filmed at night off the island of Hawaii shows an example of their swimming behavior.

== Visual system ==
Two facts are known regarding the visual system of the leptocephali. The first is that they have a rod-dominated visual system. The second is that the Synaphobranchidae (a specific family of leptocephali) have telescopic eyes, meaning a tubular eye with a sphere-shaped lens on the top occurs.

== Aquaculture ==
Some progress has been made to grow the leptocephali of the Japanese eel in the laboratory. The goal of that effort is to produce glass eels through artificial spawning and larval rearing, to be used for aquaculture to produce unagi for food. Unagi is a popular food in Japan and East Asia. Due to the strange nature of the leptocephali, this has not been easy. Trying to artificially recreate marine snow has proven difficult for scientists.

Leptocephali are rarely used as food, except in some parts of Japan. The leptocephali of the common Japanese conger, Conger myriaster, are called noresore·のれそれ in Kōchi Prefecture, Japan, and are often served uncooked to the table, and are eaten after dipping in tosazu mixed vinegar. It is a spring seasonal specialty.

== See also ==
- Eel life history
- Eel
- Elopomorpha
