= The Gospel of the Eels =

2019 book by Patrik Svensson

The Gospel of the Eels: A Father, a Son and the World's Most Enigmatic Fish
- The first edition
- Author: Patrik Svensson
- Original title: Ålevangeliet: Berättelsen om världens mest gåtfulla fisk
- Translator: Agnes Broomé
- Language: Swedish
- Subject: Eel life history
- Genre: history, autobiography
- Published: 30 July 2019
- Publisher: Albert Bonniers förlag
- Publication place: Sweden
- Awards: August Prize (2019)

The Gospel of the Eels: A Father, a Son and the World's Most Enigmatic Fish (Swedish: Ålevangeliet: Berättelsen om världens mest gåtfulla fisk) is a 2019 non-fiction book written by Swedish journalist and author Patrik Svensson. It won the 2019 August Prize for non-fiction.

The book covers both the eel as a species and the eel's cultural history, and also has an autobiographical story about the author's relationship with his father.

In 2020, it was translated into English by Agnes Broomé.
