= Valliculture =

Valliculture is an ancient fish culture practice that originated in the Mediterranean region namely the Adriatic and Tyrrhenian coasts. People exploit the seasonal migrations of some fish species from the sea into the lagoons by preventing the fish from returning to the sea. The term now applies to fish culture in coastal lagoons or brackish water bodies based on seasonal migrations of fish. The ancient practice of valliculture is not as prominent as before; however, modern aquaculture heavily relies on the venerable principles of the system.

== History ==
In the 1st century BC, Italy became the pioneer region of fish farming practices. These practices gave rise to valliculture in the 12 century in the Venetian lagoon. The word valliculture comes from the Latin word "valim" meaning embankment, wall, or mound. This method of fish farming incorporates the use of natural and man-made enclosures to capture fish that have migrated with the natural lagoon currents of the Adriatic Sea right off the coast of Italy. The first forms of these entrapments were made of reed, however, as time has passed the enclosures have evolved into being man-made with natural materials such as rocks, mud, wood, and vegetation. These materials prove to be airtight and are able to achieve complete isolation.

The practice of valliculture requires fish at different life stages to be processed differently. To suit these needs new areas with enclosures were soon added to the system. These areas include space for younger fish to adapt to the environment of the lagoon enclosure, waterways for fish that are in their winter rest, and a system that allows the farmers to catch the well establish adult fish. These lagoons have access to a freshwater supply and a salt water supply.

== Conditions ==
The enclosures for fish fry, called rearing ponds, are typically around 80 cm deep. However, the enclosures used for fishing and wintering are 2 to 4 feet deep. The first lagoons developed in valliculture have water that flows in from the sea. This causes the temperature and salinity of the water to vary drastically. These conditions can only support species that can tolerate different levels of salinity, euryhaline, and species that can tolerate a wide range of temperatures, eurythermal.

The fish are fed a combination of pre-manufactured dry and wet food. Dry food is used for the fattening process in which the fish are slightly overfed to prepare them for commercial sale. The amount of food given to the fish is determined by the size of the fish and the temperature of the water. The fish are fed 4 to 5 times per day. The appetency of the food must also be checked because population decreases can serve as a result of poor quality food.

== See also ==
- Aquaculture
