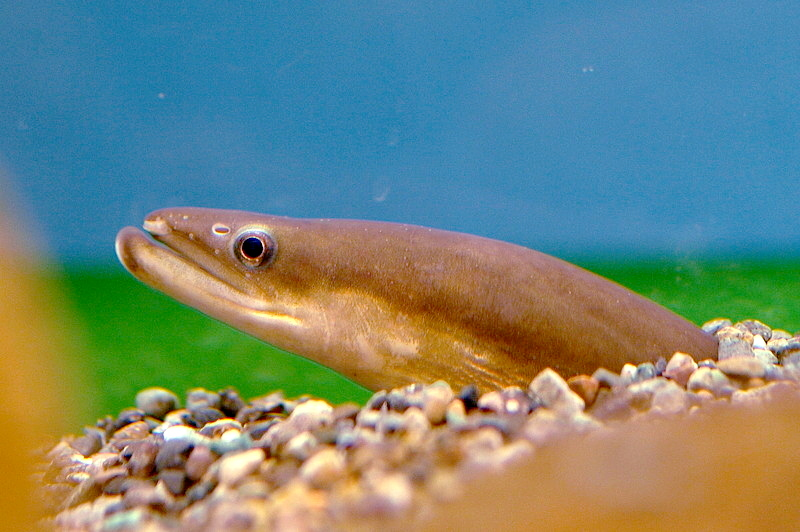

Conservation status
- Endangered (IUCN 3.1)

Scientific classification
- Kingdom: Animalia
- Phylum: Chordata
- Class: Actinopterygii
- Division: Teleostei
- Order: Anguilliformes
- Family: Anguillidae
- Genus: Anguilla
- Species: A. japonica

Binomial name
- Anguilla japonica Temminck & Schlegel, 1846

Synonyms
- Anguilla angustidens Kaup, 1856; Anguilla breviceps Chu & Jin, 1984; Anguilla manabei Jordan, 1913; Anguilla nigricans Chu & Wu, 1984; Anguilla remifera Jordan & Evermann, 1902; Anguilla sinensis McClelland, 1844; Muraena pekinensis Basilewsky, 1855

= Japanese eel =

Species of fish

The Japanese eel (Anguilla japonica; nihon unagi (日本鰻)) is a species of anguillid eel found in Japan, Korea, Taiwan, China, and Vietnam, as well as the northern Philippines. Like all the eels of the genus Anguilla and the family Anguillidae, it is catadromous, meaning it spawns in the sea but lives most of its adult life in freshwater.

In Japan, it is called unagi, and is an essential part of the food culture, with many restaurants serving grilled eel called kabayaki. However, presumably due to a combination of overfishing and habitat loss or changing water conditions in the ocean interfering with spawning and the transport of their leptocephali this species is endangered. In Japan, research has been conducted on the full life-cycle aquaculture of the Japanese eel as a means of addressing the underlying problem of declining wild populations. In 2010, Japan became the first country to induce spawning using broodstock that had been raised from artificially obtained eggs. In 2026, kabayaki prepared from fully farmed Japanese eel was commercially introduced for the first time.

== Breeding ==
Between April and November, the Japanese eels leave their freshwater river habitats in East Asia to breed larvae in the ocean near the North Equatorial Current in the western North Pacific. Adult Japanese eels migrate thousands of kilometers from freshwater rivers in East Asia to their spawning area without feeding. The eels are able to travel this long distance without nutrients because of the oils they collect in their bodies before the migration out to sea. The spawning area for this species is approximately 15°N, 140°E, a location corresponding with the location of a salinity front separating the north equatorial current from the tropical waters. This front is believed to indicate to the eels that they are in their preferred spawning location. The North Equatorial Current assists the eels in migrating from the center of the Pacific Ocean to the coast of Asia; without this indicator, the larvae would end up in the Mindanao Current.

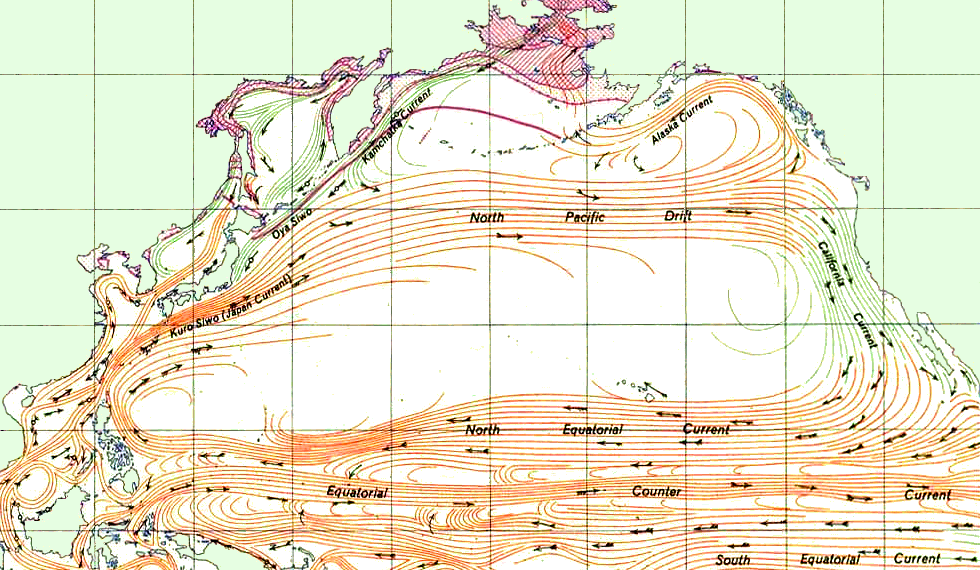
North Equatorial Current

The discovery of the Japanese eel breeding location was a new finding in 1991 when R.V. Hakuho Maru performed a research cruise. Before this research cruise, little was known about how eels breed, and there is still so much to learn as these eels remain a mystery to many scientists. Until the late 20th century, scientists hypothesized that the different stages of the eel's life cycle were entirely different species. Then in 2005, the same team of Japanese scientists at the University of Tokyo found a more precise location of spawning based on genetically identified specimens of newly hatched pre-larva only 2 to 5 days old in a small area near the Suruga Seamount to the west of the Mariana Islands (14–17° N, 142–143° E).

The larvae, also known as leptocephalius, hatch from the egg approximately 36 hours after fertilization. These leptocephalius grow from 7.9 to 34.2 mm, growing by 0.56 mm daily. After riding the north equatorial current, the leptocephali take and head northward by the Kuroshio Current to east Asia. These eels live in rivers, lakes, and estuaries until they return to the ocean as adults to breed and die off.

== Life cycle ==
Eel life cycle

The Japanese eel metamorphoses into five stages throughout its life cycle, all with their distinct names. In the open ocean, leptocephalus, the first stage after the egg, feed on marine snow. Approximately 18 months after hatching, they metamorphose into "glass eels", a name derived from their clear appearance.

As these glass eels reach their freshwater habitats from December to April they become known as elvers. The migration time of this species corresponds with the moon as it affects the tide. This time is during a tide that occurs at night and simulates a flood making it easier for the eels to survive their migration. An eel at this stage in its life cycle is 6 cm long with an intense instinct to swim upstream. This instinct allows them to scale any scenario and attempt to make it to their permanent habitat. This migration is generally nocturnal, and the eels face few predators. They swim upstream during the night hours and hide in river banks and under rocks during the day. Two weeks into this migration, the eels develop a black coloring and metamorphosis from elvers to brown-stage eels to continue their journey.

The brown-stage, also known as the yellow stage, of the eel's life lasts for 5–10 years, and during this time, the eel feeds on worms and insects. The characteristics of this stage include a dull pigment with a grey, brown, and greenish top and white underbelly. This pigment is related to the environment as it relies significantly on the color of the water. The eels grow to around their adult size during this time, which is up to 57 – 60 cm for females and 35 cm for males. At 30 cm, the eels grow sexual organs for the first time and prepare to make their great migration.

Once these eels reach adulthood, they develop a silvery color under their skin. This change in appearance signals that they are entering their last stage of life, the silver stage. During this time, the eels prepare to migrate to the spawning area by naturally producing more oil in their body. This oil is stored in the muscles of the eels and is approximately 20% of their body mass. Once the appropriate content of the oil is reached, the eels stop feeding. During the autumn and generally on the last quarter of the moon, the eels migrate downstream to the center of the Pacific.

== Life history and habitat ==
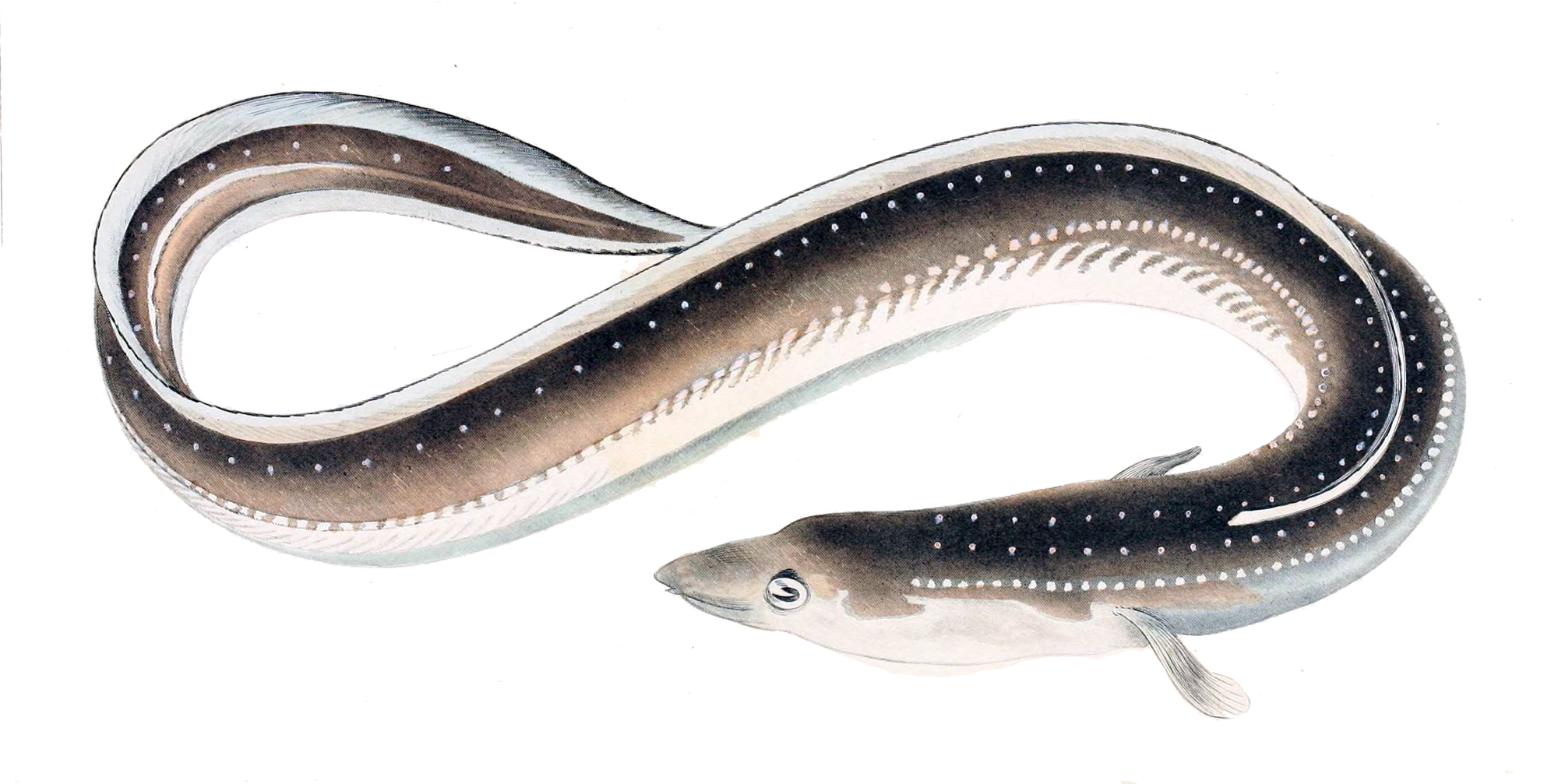
Japanese eel

The Japanese eel and other anguillid eels live in freshwater and estuaries, an area where a freshwater river meets the ocean.

Japanese eel eggs have been collected and genetically identified on a research vessel. The collections of eggs and recently hatched larvae have been made along the western side of the seamount chain of the West Mariana Ridge. Mature adults of the Japanese eel and giant mottled eel were captured using large midwater trawls in 2008 by Japanese scientists at the Fisheries Research Agency. The adults of the Japanese eel appear to spawn in the upper few hundred meters of the ocean, based on the recent catches of their spawning adults, eggs, and newly hatched larvae. The timing of catches of eggs and larvae and the ages of larger larvae have shown that Japanese eels only spawn during the few days just before the new moon period of each month during their spawning season.

After hatching in the ocean, the leptocephali are carried westward by the North Equatorial Current and then northward by the Kuroshio Current to East Asia. before they metamorphose into the glass eel stage. The glass eels then enter the estuaries and headwaters of rivers and many travel upstream. In fresh water and estuaries, the diet of yellow eels consists mainly of shrimp, other crustaceans, aquatic insects, and small fishes.

== Behavior ==
When experimentally fed to dark sleepers, most Japanese eels attempted to escape up the digestive tract into the gills and esophagus. Some even successfully escaped via the gills. Others that were fully encased in the stomach circled inside, as if searching for a way out.

== Conservation ==
=== Threats ===
In the case of the Japanese eel's spawning is likely affected by the north–south shifts of a salinity front created by an area of low-salinity waters resulting from tropical rainfall. The front is thought to be detected by the adult spawning eels and to affect the latitudes at which they spawn. A northward shift in the front that occurred over the past 30 years appears to have occurred, which could cause more larvae to be retained in eddies offshore in the region east of Taiwan, and southward shifts in the salinity front have been observed in recent years that could increase southward transport into the Mindanao Current that flows into the Celebes Sea. These types of unfavorable larval transport are thought to reduce the success of the Japanese eels that reach river mouths as glass eels.

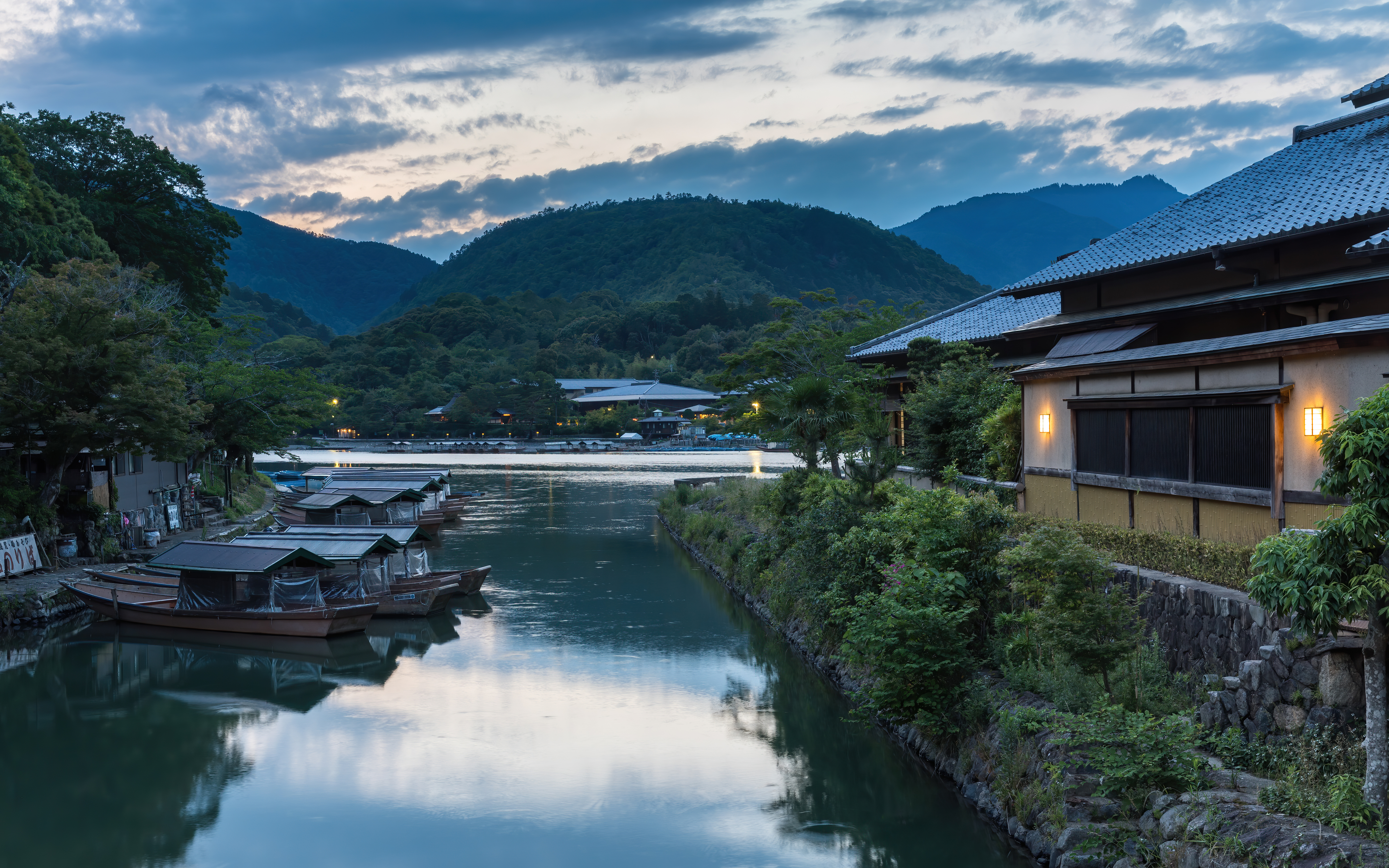
Example of growth of human population by water

The decline of the population of the Japanese eel is also directly related to the strong connection that the eel's life cycle has with the temperature of the water. This species relies on this environmental signal to know when to migrate in and out of their fresh water habitat; thus, the change in water temperature is directly proportional to the decline in population size. These rising water temperatures are due to ocean acidification and the thinning of the ozone layer. These eels are having a more challenging time knowing when to migrate. When migrating into their freshwater habitats, they prefer 8 to 10 degrees Celsius, a temperature usually reached in the autumn months but is occurring later and later in the year.

Another factor that is effecting the Japanese eel is habitat loss. The coast is becoming a more preferred location for humans to live leading to climate and pollution worsening, taking away from the habitat of these eels. On average from 1970s–2010s, 76.8% of the Japanese eels habitat was lost to human development.

=== Status ===
The Japanese Eel is considered an endangered species by International Union for Conservation of Nature (IUCN), last assessed in November 2018. According to this assessment the population size is decreasing.

=== Efforts ===
There are multiple preservation effectors that the Japanese government is undertaking to slow or stop the extinction of this highly important species for their consumption. In 2015 the Inland Water Fishery Promotion Act was put in place preventing the fishing and culturing of eels without the proper permit. The goal of this act was to slow down the over fishing of the Japanese eel and control the number of eels being taken into captivity. In December 2023, a law was passed that makes fishing glass eels without a permit punishable with up to 3 years in prison or a 30 million Japanese yen fine. There have also been efforts made to stop the habitat loss of this species through the Nature-oriented river works. The high price and demand of this species means that there was also the need for the Act on "Ensuring the Proper Domestic Distribution and Importation of Specified Aquatic Animals and Plants" that prohibits harvesting and culturing these eels without a permit.

== Aquaculture ==
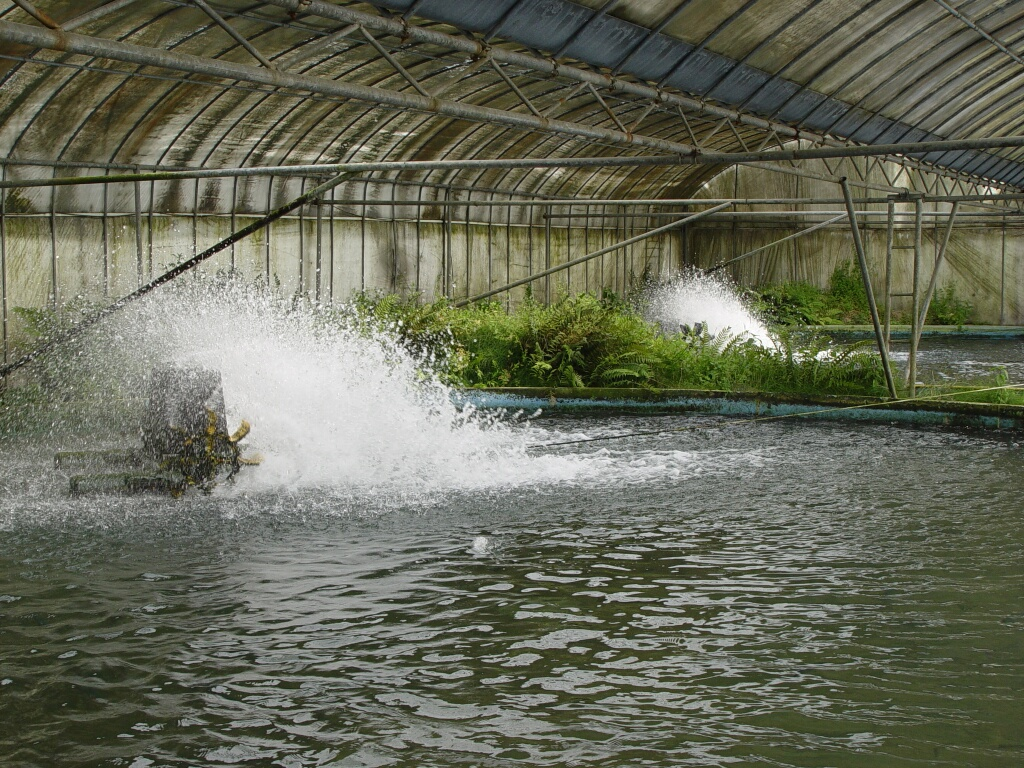
Green water culture system for Japanese eel

Capture (blue) and aquaculture (green) production of Japanese eel (Anguilla japonica) in thousand tonnes from 1950 to 2022, as reported by the FAO

The culturing of eels was started in Japan in 1894 and has become the most significant eel culture industry in the world since. Japan is the biggest consumer and producer of eels generating approximately 70–90% of the eel population as of 1991. The farming of the Japanese eel is challenging due to the breeding habits. This species' agriculture relies heavily on their catch in their elver stage. A net is strewn across the rivers that these eels migrate up in the early autumn, and then they are transported to cultured ponds to grow to commercial size. The female eel grows to a much bigger size and has a longer life span than the male eel; therefore, the cultured population is 90% female. The heavy farming of this species has negatively impacted the conservation of the species; however, the production and consumption have not slowed.

To address the decline in wild populations at its source, Japan has pursued the development of a closed-cycle aquaculture system for the Japanese eel (Anguilla japonica), in which individuals are reared from eggs to adulthood in captivity, induced to spawn, and their offspring are subsequently raised to maturity in successive generations. In 1973, Hokkaido University succeeded in hatching eel eggs in a laboratory for the first time in the world. In 2010, Japan became the first country to achieve induced spawning using broodstock that had been raised to adulthood from artificially obtained eggs. By 2026, the production cost per fully farmed Japanese eel had been reduced from an initial 40,000 yen to approximately 1,800 yen, or one twenty-second of the original level. However, this remains roughly three times higher than the cost of conventional aquaculture, which relies on the capture of wild juvenile Japanese eels and their subsequent grow-out to market size. In May 2026, Aeon Co., Ltd. began sales of kabayaki prepared using fully farmed Japanese eel, marking the first commercial offering of its kind worldwide.

== Scientific and medical use ==
Bilirubin-inducible green fluorescent protein UnaG

Identifiers
- Organism: Anguilla japonica
- Symbol: UnaG
- Orthologs: OMA: entry
- UniProt: P0DM59
Search for
- Structures: Swiss-model
- Domains: InterPro

The Japanese eel has the ability to produce the protein UnaG which makes it unique among vertebrates. This protein is only found in the muscles of this species of eels making it a rare commodity. UnaG has demonstrated utility in life sciences and can be used to fluorescently label cells and tag proteins when exogenously expressed. This protein has been used in an experimental diagnostic test to assess liver function.

== Consumption ==
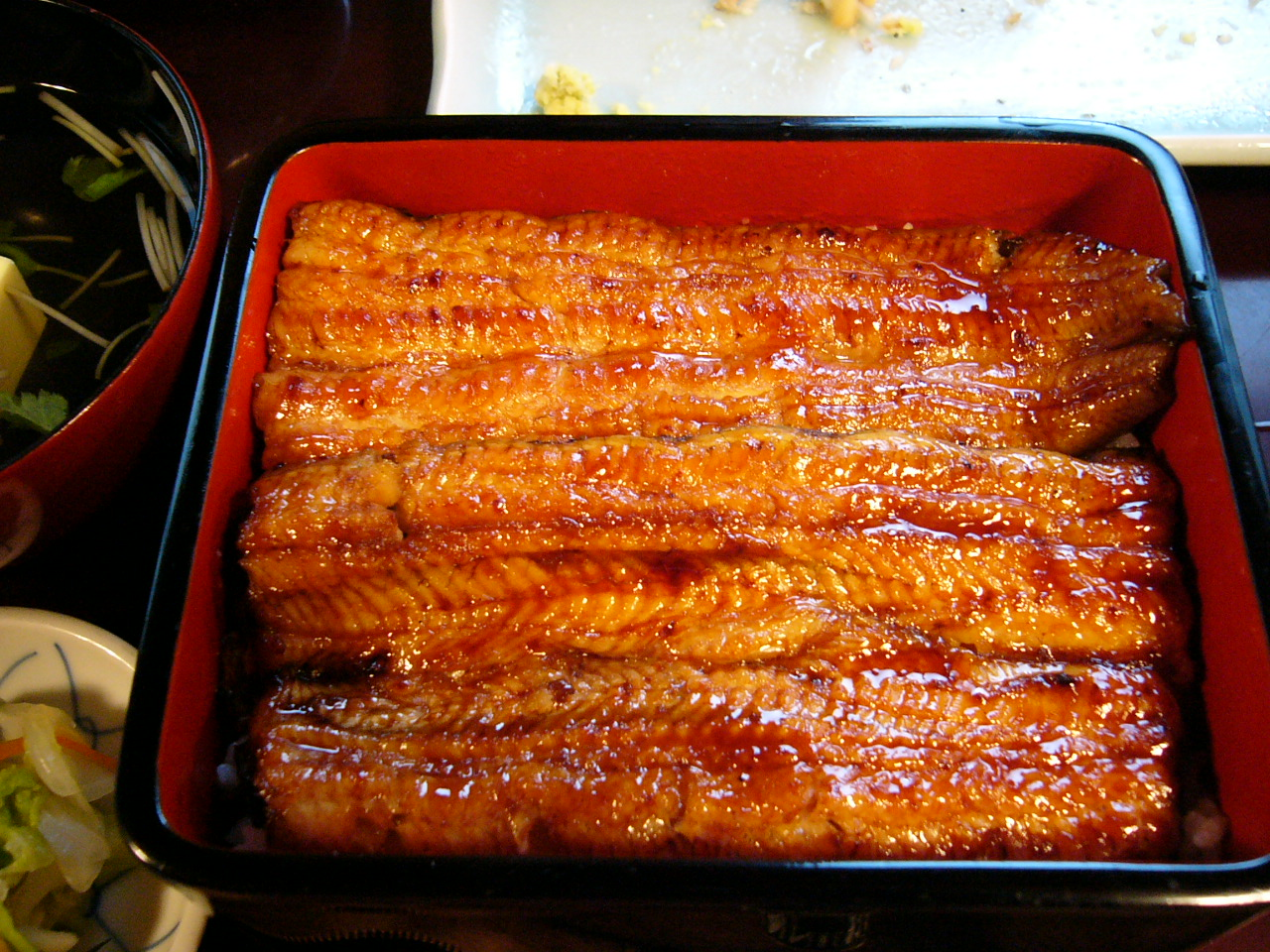
Unajū, grilled Japanese eel served in layered boxes

As a food product, the Japanese eel is commonly referred to as unagi or kabayaki, with the latter being the method which the eels are often prepared. Kabayaki eels are prepared by being cut into fillets, deboned, skewered, marinated in sweet soy sauce (usually tare sauce) and then grilled. Japanese eels that have been grilled without tare sauce and seasoned only with salt are referred as Shirayaki. Eels are eaten all year round in Japan.

Dishes made with Japanese eel include unajū, a dish consisting of the better cuts of eel served in a lacquered box over steamed rice, and unadon, a donburi type dish where fillets of eels are served over rice in a large bowl. Japanese eel is also served as sushi, commonly called unagi sushi. Some notable types include unakyu, a type of sushi containing eel and cucumber, and rock and roll, a western-style sushi made with eel and avocado.

The Japanese eel contains a protein toxin in its blood that can cause harm to any mammals that ingest it, including humans. However, there is no need for any special procedures as temperatures of 58–70 °C (136–158 °F) destroy the toxin. Thus, Japanese eels are always cooked before consumption, even unagi sushi. Eels intended to be used in sushi are usually sold in pre-cooked fillets by many sushi suppliers.

Due to the decline of the population of the Japanese eels, they are often being substituted with European or American eels, even within Japan, where Japanese eels were commonly used.

Japanese eels are a good source of a wide range of vitamins and minerals. A serving of 100 grams contains roughly 120% of vitamin B_{12}, 53% of vitamin D and 126% of the recommended daily value of vitamin A. They are also a source of vitamins such as B_{1}, B_{2}, E, D and niacin. Minerals such as phosphorus, selenium, zinc and potassium are also present, along with traces of magnesium, copper, and iron. Additionally, they are rich in dietary protein and contain a good amount of omega-3 fatty acids, albeit not as much as other seafood, like sardines. They contain relatively low quantities of mercury.

== See also ==
- Eel life history
