= Nagoya cuisine =

Japanese regional cuisine of the city of Nagoya

Nagoya cuisine (名古屋めし, Nagoya meshi) is a Japanese regional cuisine of the city of Nagoya and surrounding region in Central Japan. Due to differences in culture, historical contact with other regions, climate, and availability of ingredients, Nagoya cuisine has a distinctive style and unique aspects. Although many dishes derive from local tradition, Nagoya cuisine has also been inspired by foreign cuisines such as Taiwanese cuisine and Italian cuisine. Seasonings such as hatchō miso, mame miso, or tamari (a type of soy sauce produced mainly in the region) characterize the representative foods of Nagoya cuisine.

Nagoya cuisine can be classified into five main categories:

- Miso-based (misokatsu, etc.)
- Chicken-based (tebasaki, etc.)
- Italian-style (ankake spaghetti, etc.)
- Asian-style (Taiwan ramen, etc.)
- Cafe foods (ogura toast, etc.)

Nagoya kōchin chicken has been a traditional ingredient of Nagoya cuisine since prewar times. Shrimp – especially fried shrimp, "ebi fry" (エビフライ, ebi furai), pronounced ebi furyā (エビフリャー) in Nagoya dialect – is another specialty, and is the "official marine life symbol" of the prefecture. Dishes inspired by foreign food, including various local spaghetti dishes and "Taiwanese" noodles, have become an increasingly significant part of Nagoya cuisine.

== Local dishes ==
- Tebasaki: Chicken wings marinated in a sweet sauce with sesame seeds and other seasoning. Similar to yakitori.
- Kishimen: Flat udon noodles with a slippery texture, dipped in a light soy sauce soup and with sliced leek or other toppings. It can be eaten warm or cold.
- Various dishes made with red miso:
  - Misokatsu: Pork cutlet with sweet miso sauce
  - Miso nikomi udon: Hard udon stewed in miso soup
  - Miso oden: Miso-flavored oden stew
    - Doteni: A dish of pork or beef innards stewed with soybean miso common in the Tōkai region, considered a type of miso oden. Often stewed with daikon and konnyaku. Elsewhere in Japan, it is made with soy sauce stock and called motsuni.
  - Dotenabe: Miso nabemono with meat and vegetables
- Ogura toast: Toast spread with adzuki red bean paste (anko) and optionally butter. Originating in Nagoya, it is commonly served for breakfast as part of "morning service" in cafés in Aichi Prefecture.
- Hitsumabushi: A rice dish with unagi (eel) in a lidded wooden container. This dish is enjoyed three ways: as unadon, with seasoning, and as chazuke.
- Nagoya kōchin: A special breed of free-range chicken cross-bred between Nagoya chicken and a Cochin. The time until maturity is 2.5 times that of broiler chicken and its meat is juicy and tender, without a strong scent.
  - Toriwasa: Sashimi made of Nagoya kōchin, using the flesh, liver, heart, and gizzard.
- Ankake spaghetti: Spaghetti noodles in thick, starchy, slightly spicy, tomato-based sauce and topped with vegetables or meat (often spinach, peppers, and ham), or other toppings such as cheese, eggs, or corn.
- Taiwan ramen: Spicy ramen with soy sauce-based soup, topped with a mixture of ground pork (minced meat), garlic, and chili pepper powder, along with chives or bean sprouts. Created in Nagoya in the 1970s by a Taiwanese chef.
- Uirō: Rice dumplings made by mixing rice flour with sugar and then steaming the mixture. The name is said to have come from a Chinese medicine that resembled it in color; it is assumed that the medicine was brought by Chinese medicine vendors to Japan before the 15th century.
- Tenmusu: Rice balls wrapped in nori with tempura at the center. This dish originated in Tsu, Mie Prefecture and became popular in Nagoya.
- Moriguchizuke: Pickles made of Moriguchi daikon. The radish, about one and a half meters long and two centimeters in diameter, is pickled in barrels of sake and other seasoning. Due to their length, radishes must be packed along the inner wall of the barrel, one on top of the other.
- Oni manjū: A traditional sweet and type of manjū. The main ingredients are flour and sweet potato.
- Tamasen: A street food commonly served at festivals made with rice crackers (senbei) sandwiching a fried egg, okonomiyaki sauce, and mayonnaise
- Shiruko sando biscuits: Crunchy biscuits with red bean (shiruko)

== Gallery ==
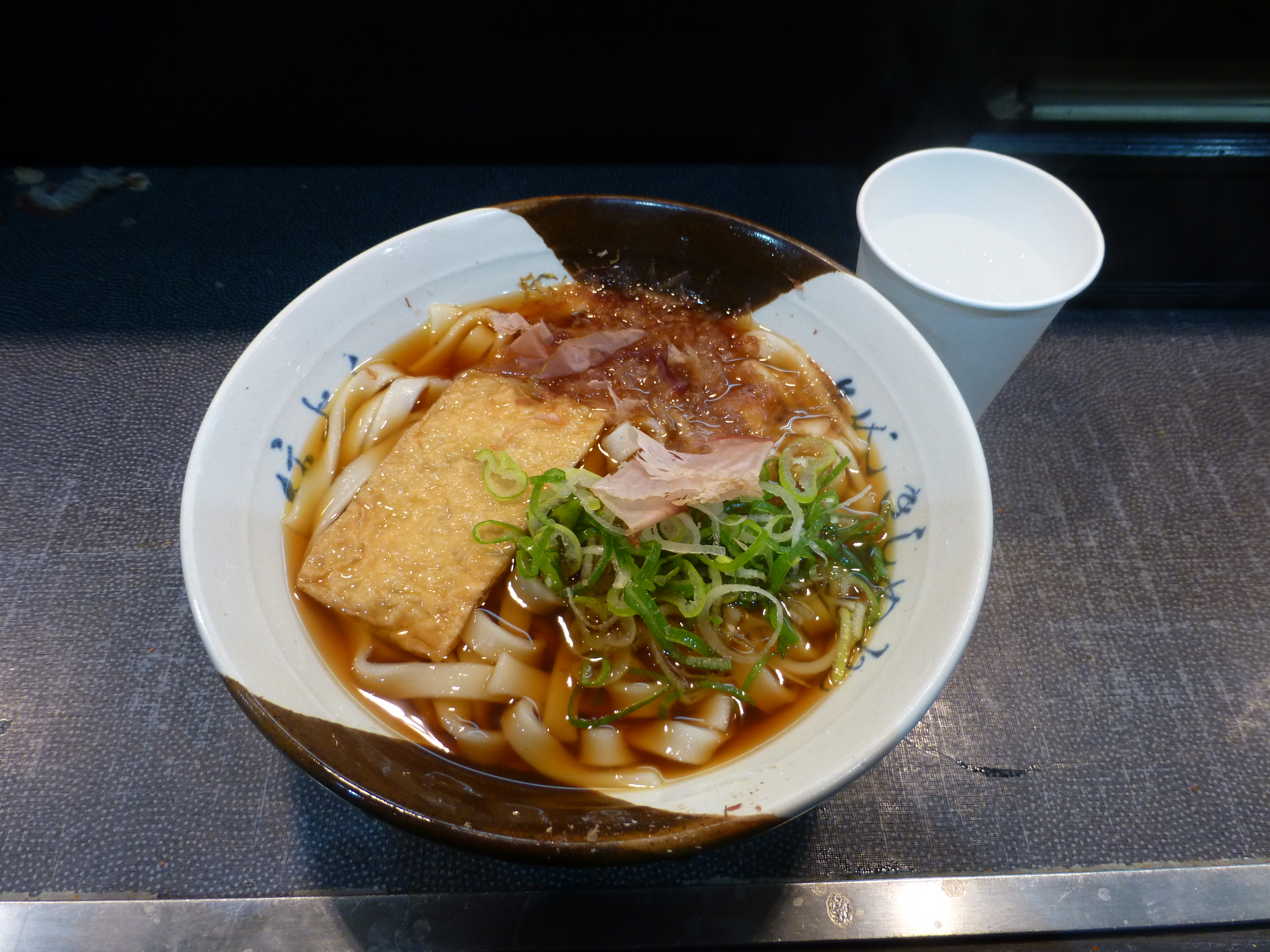
Kishimen noodle soup

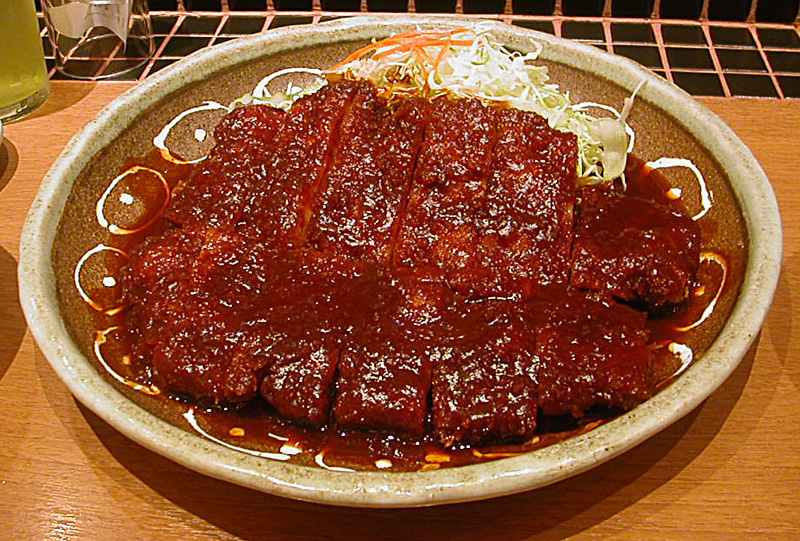
Misokatsu

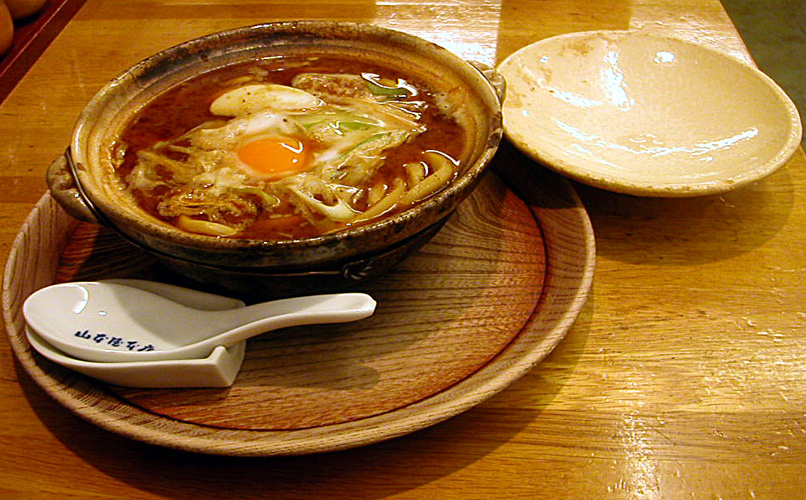
Miso nikomi udon

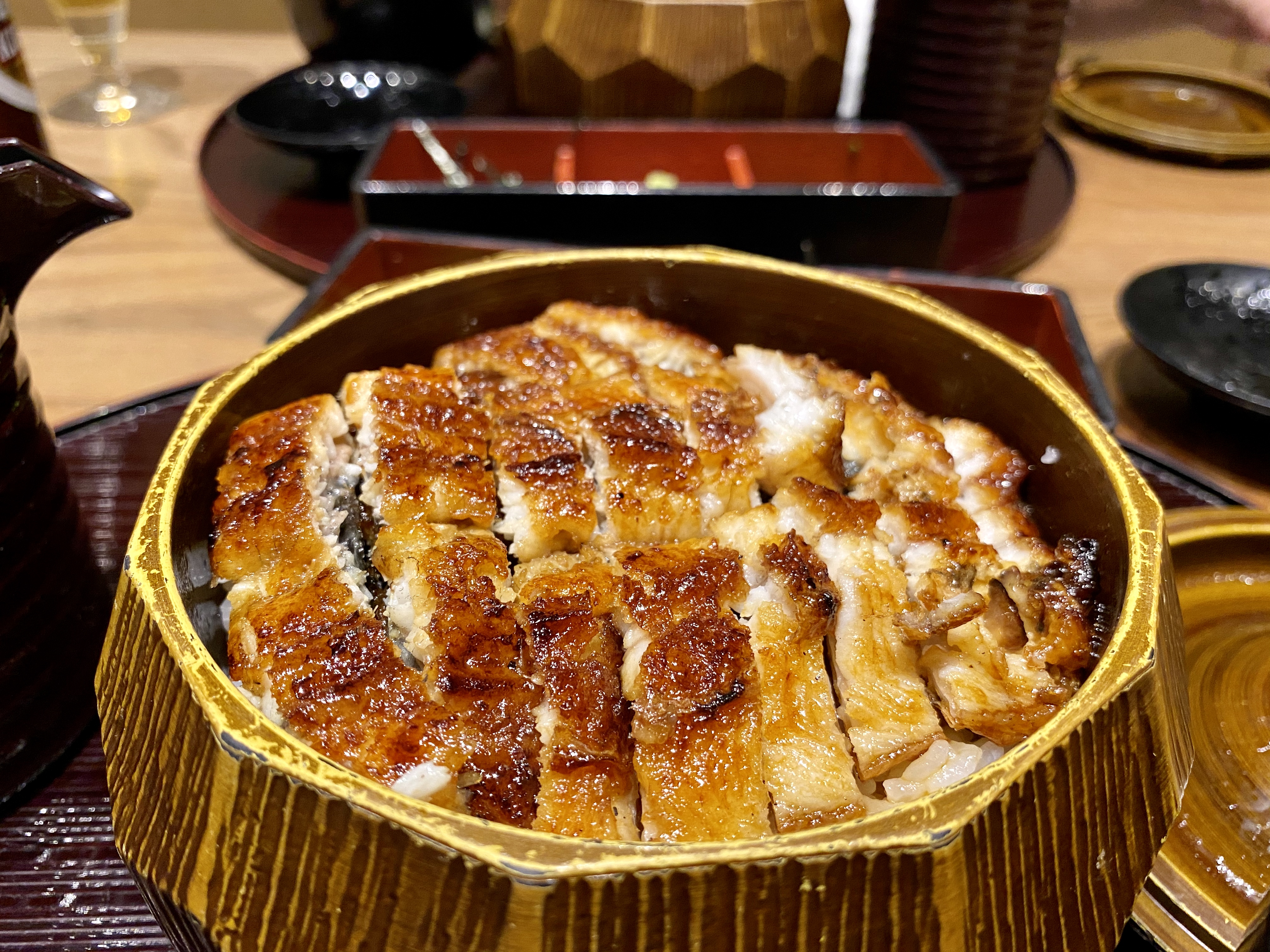
Hitsumabushi

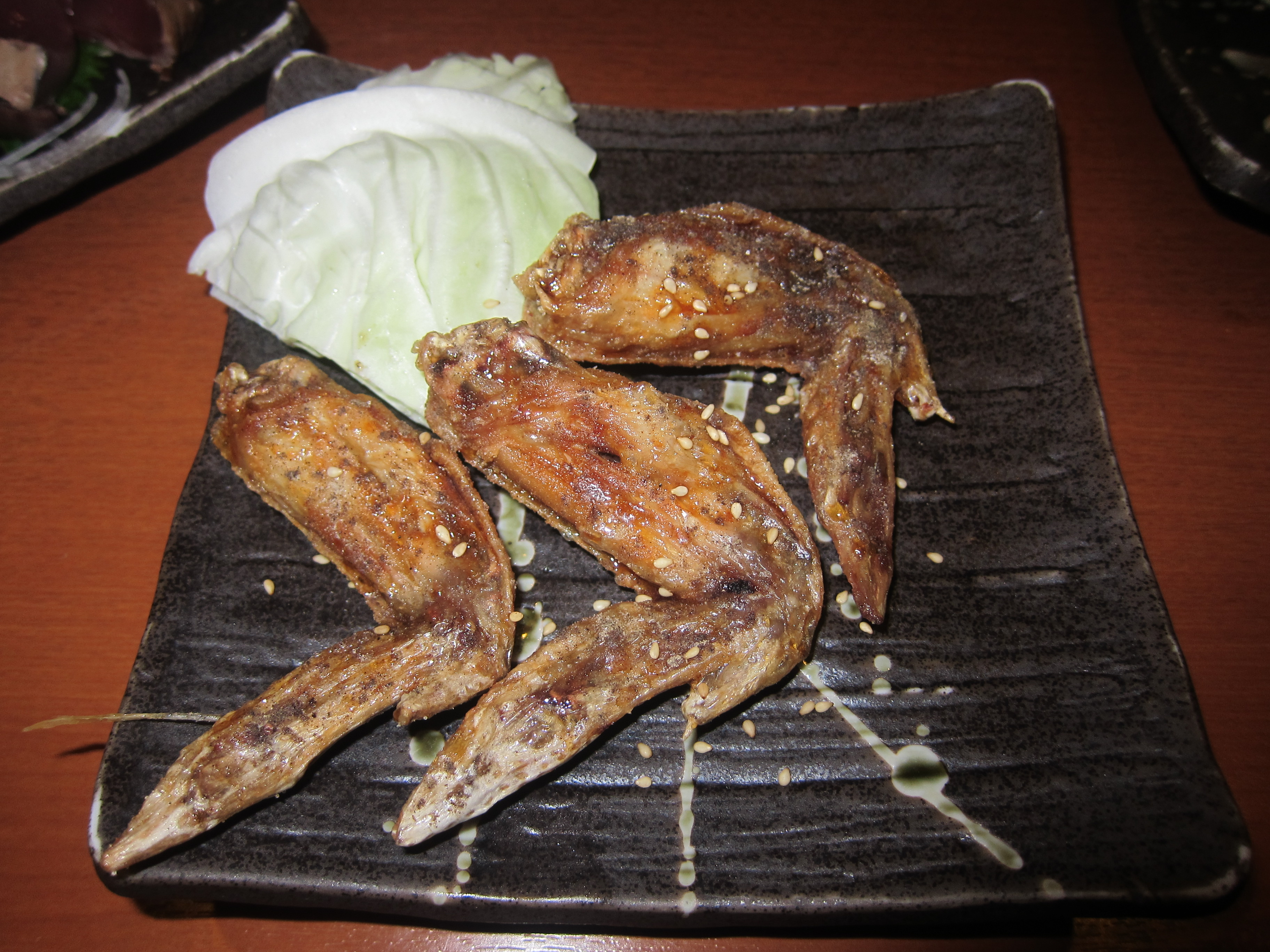
Tebasaki

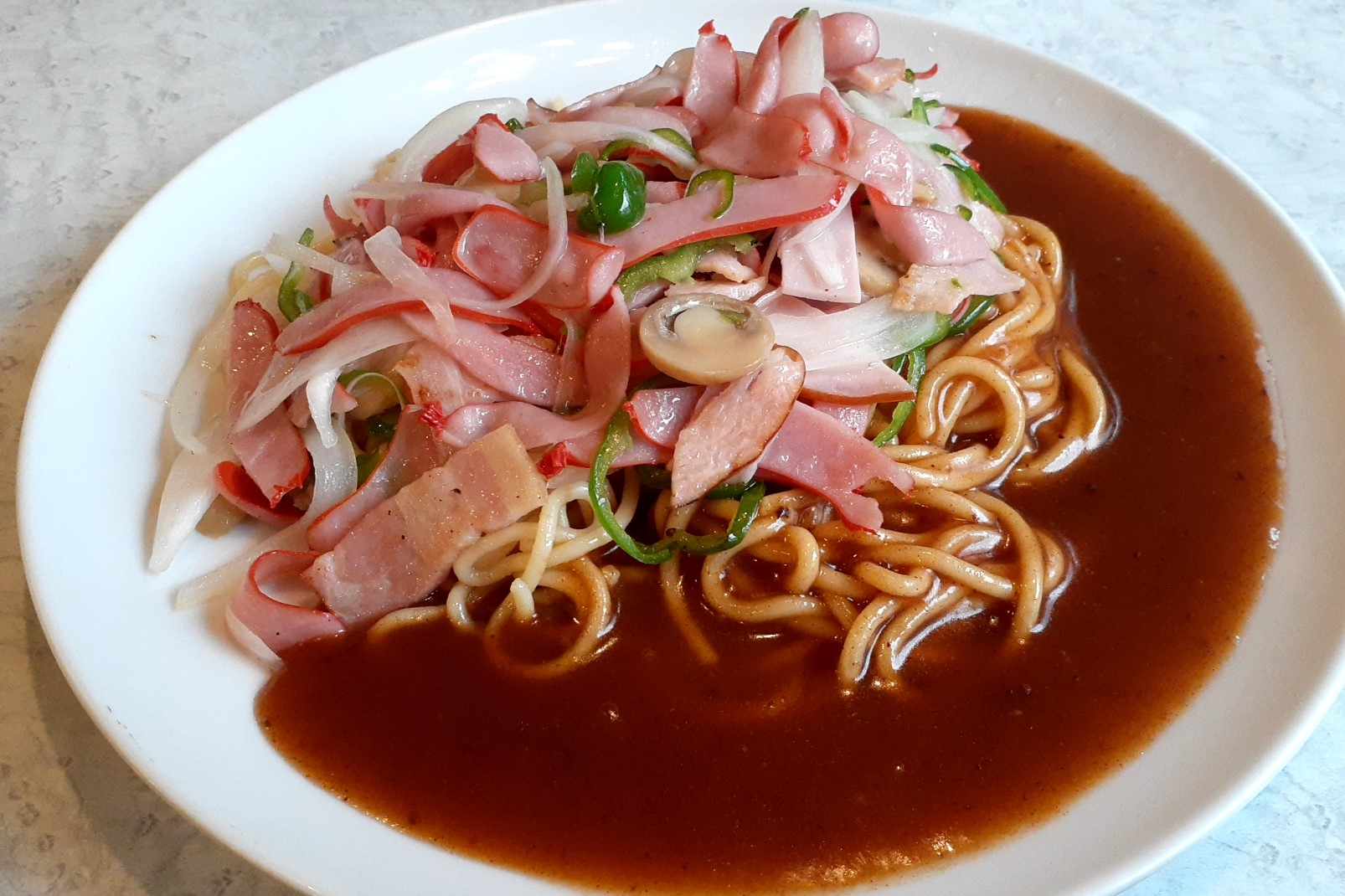
Ankake spaghetti

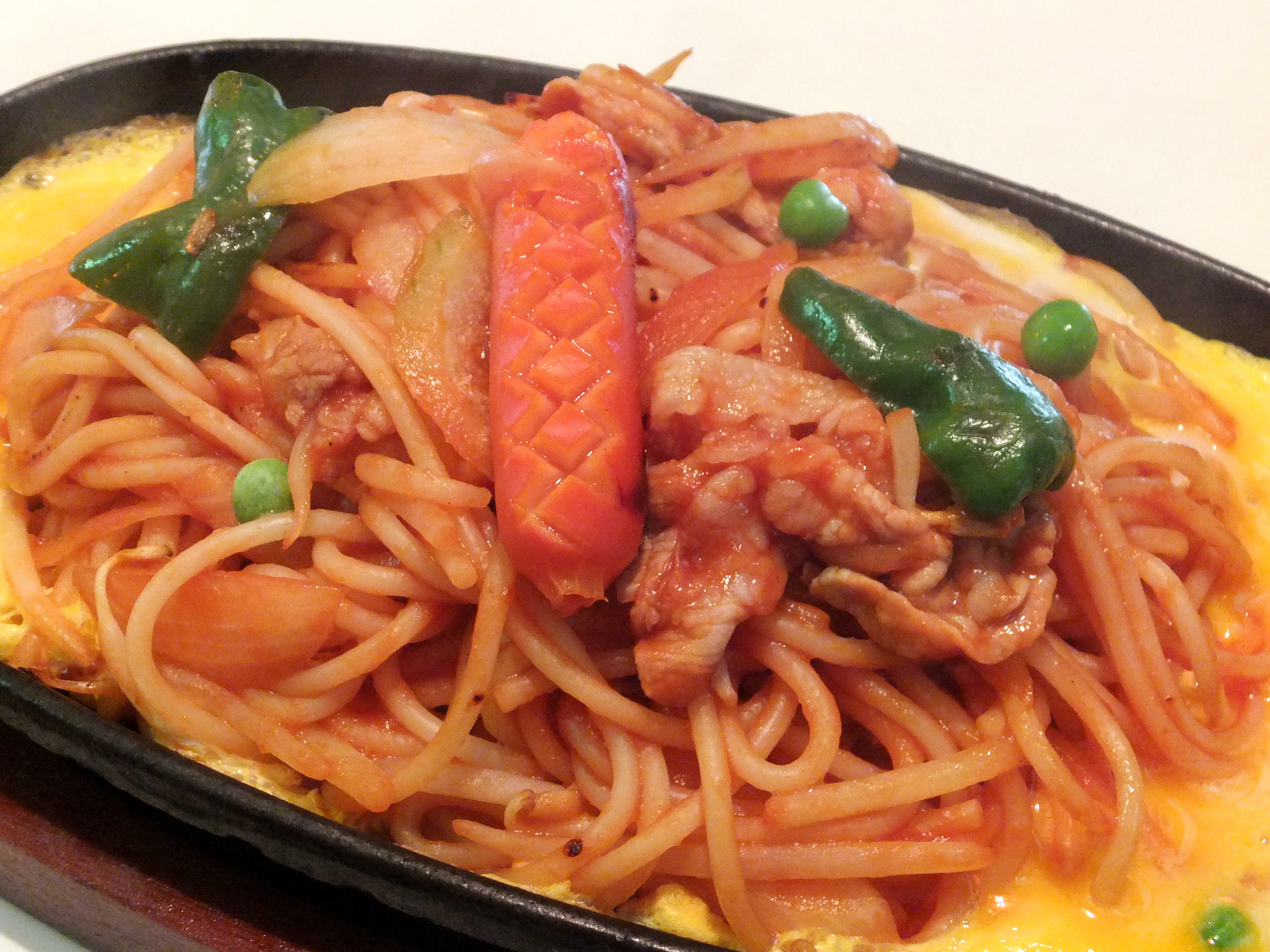
Teppan spaghetti

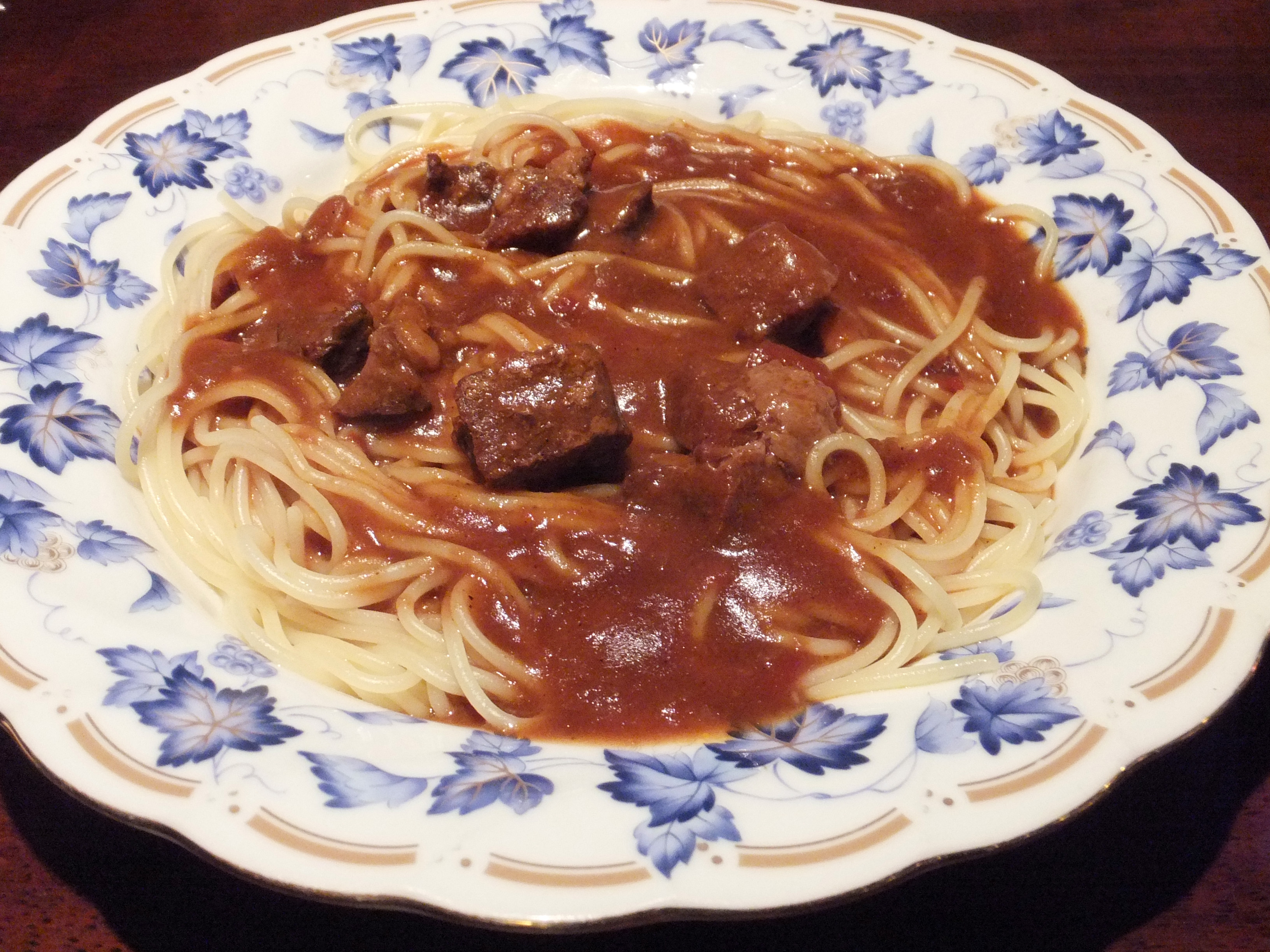
Indian spaghetti

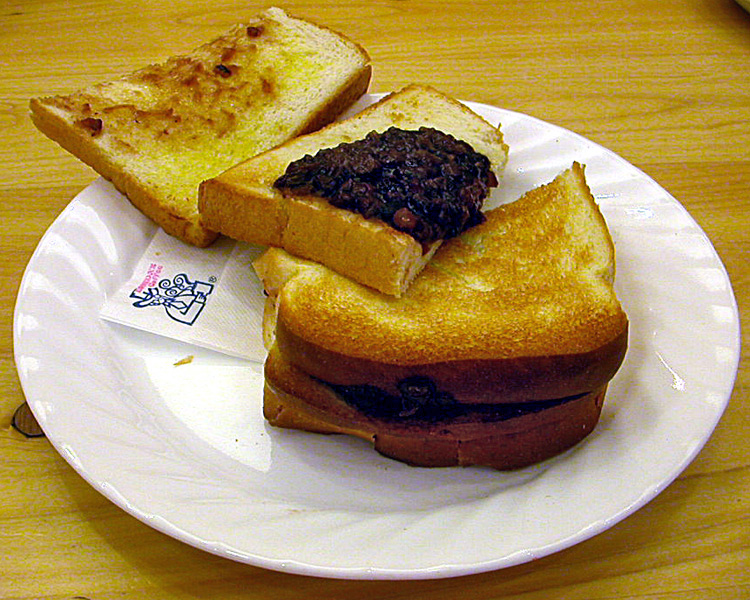
Ogura toast

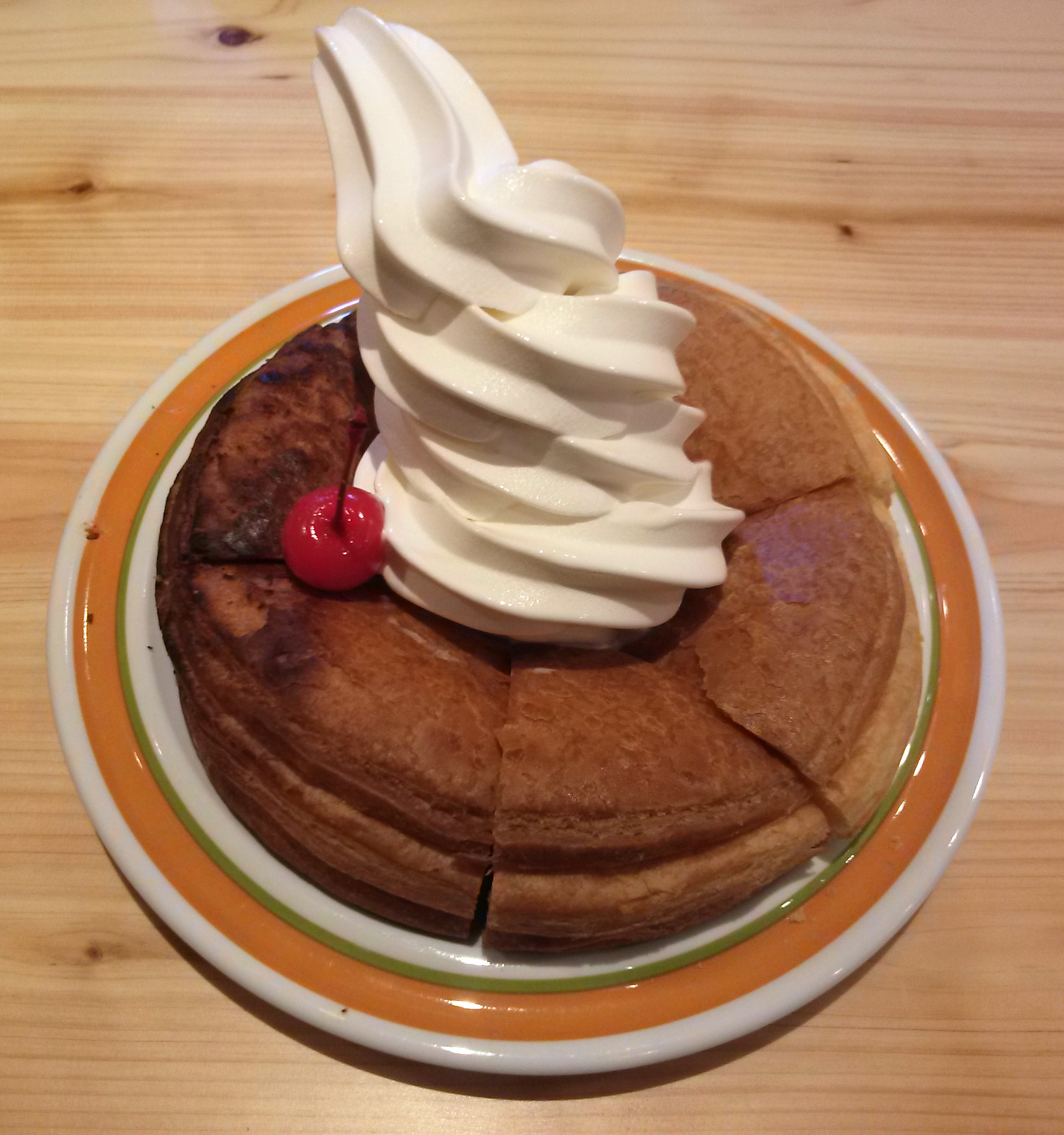
Shironoir

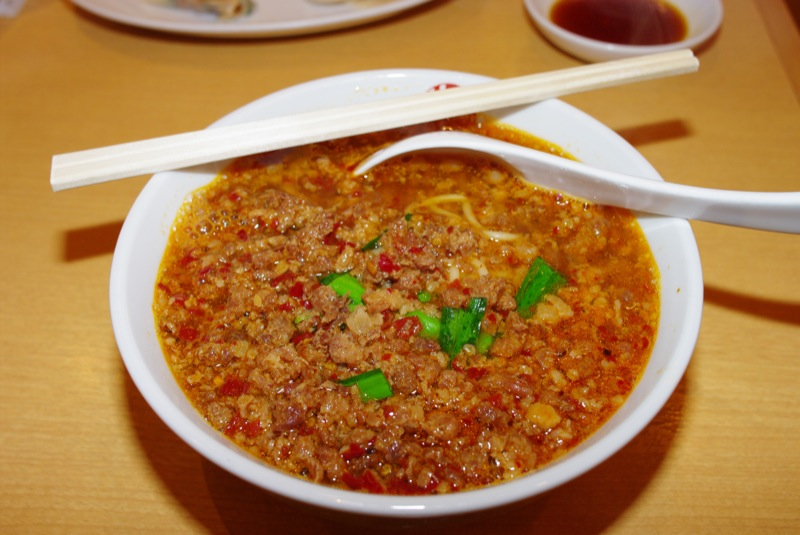
Taiwan ramen

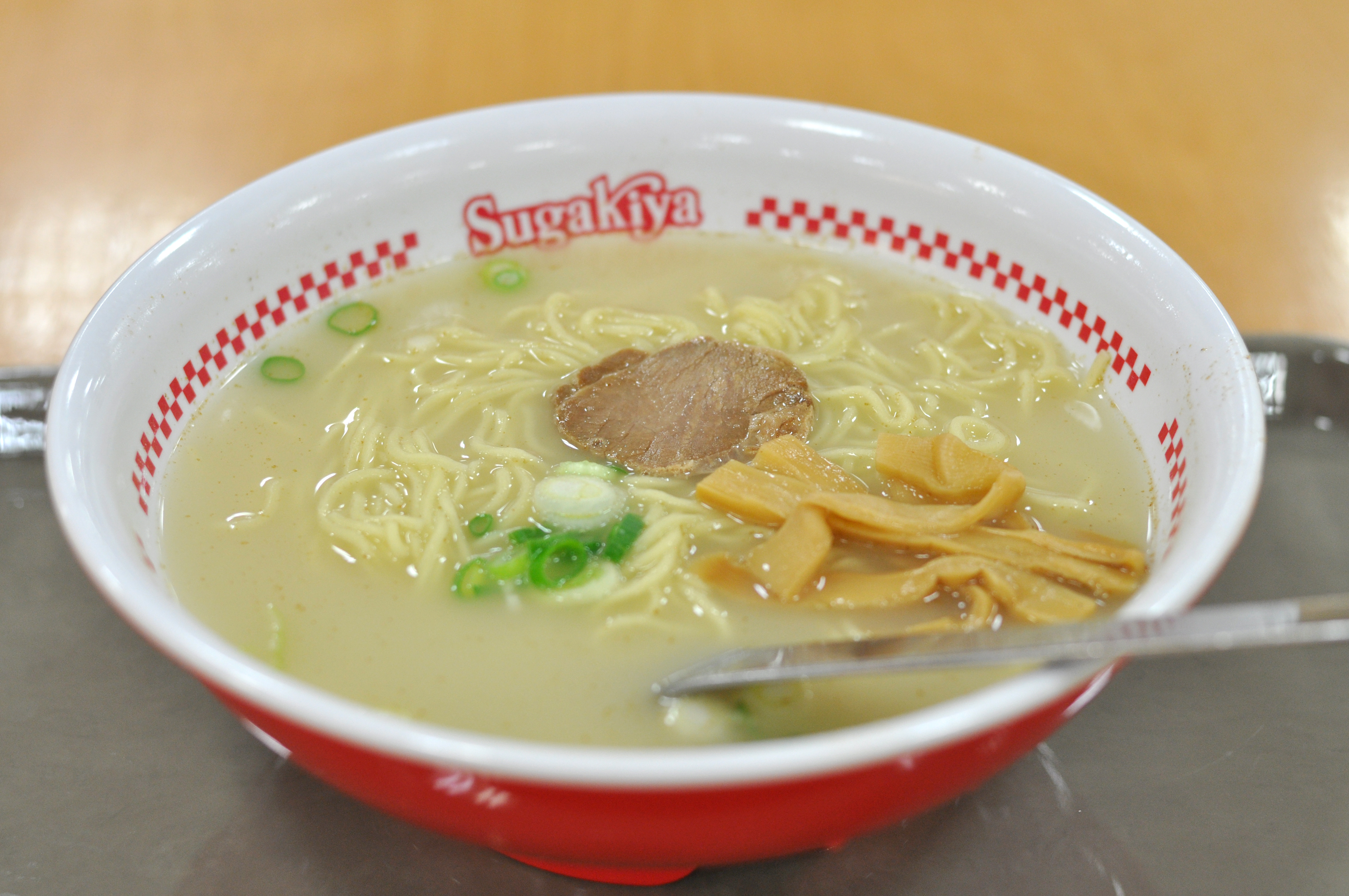
Ramen from Sugakiya

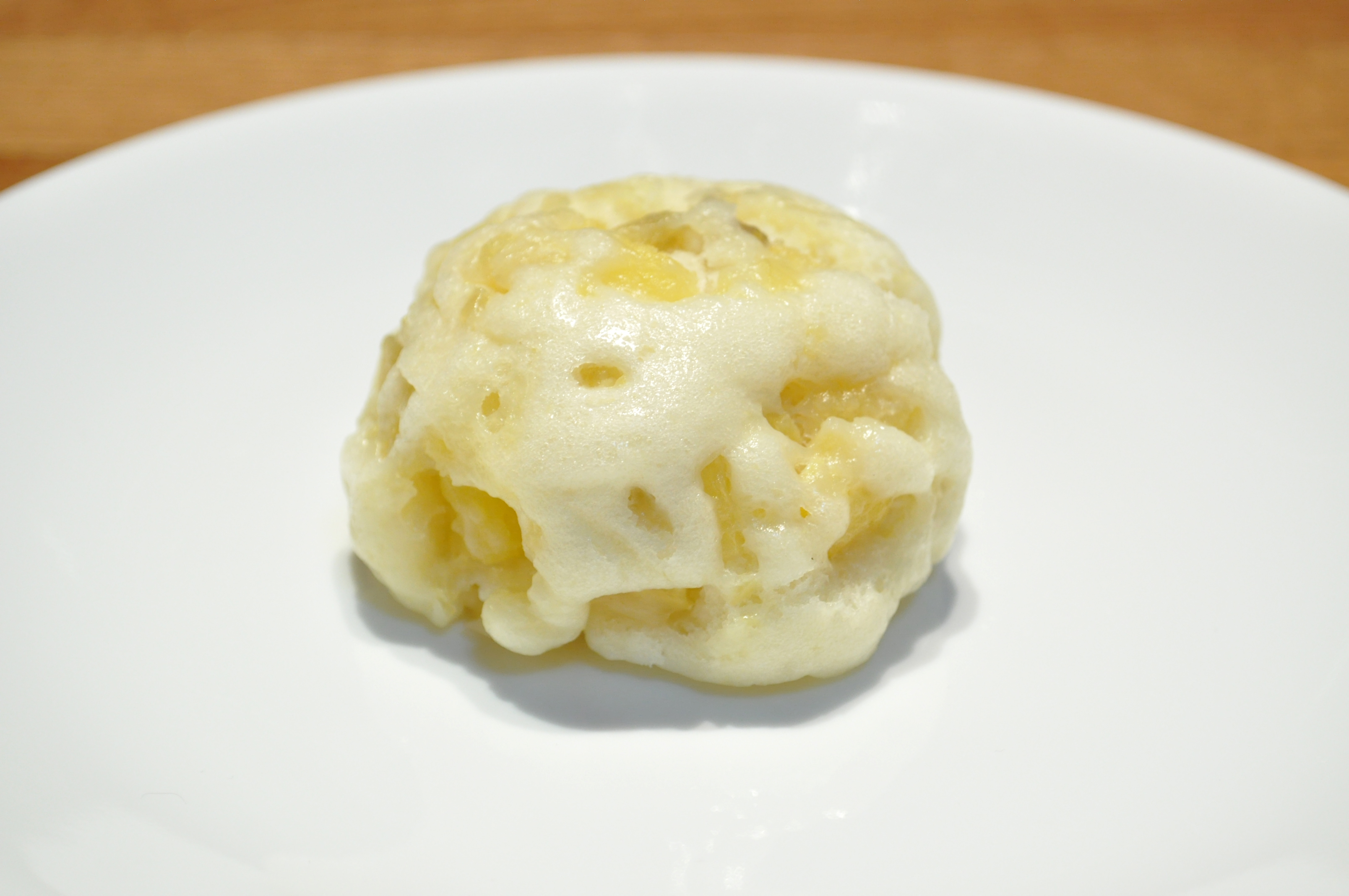
Oni-manju

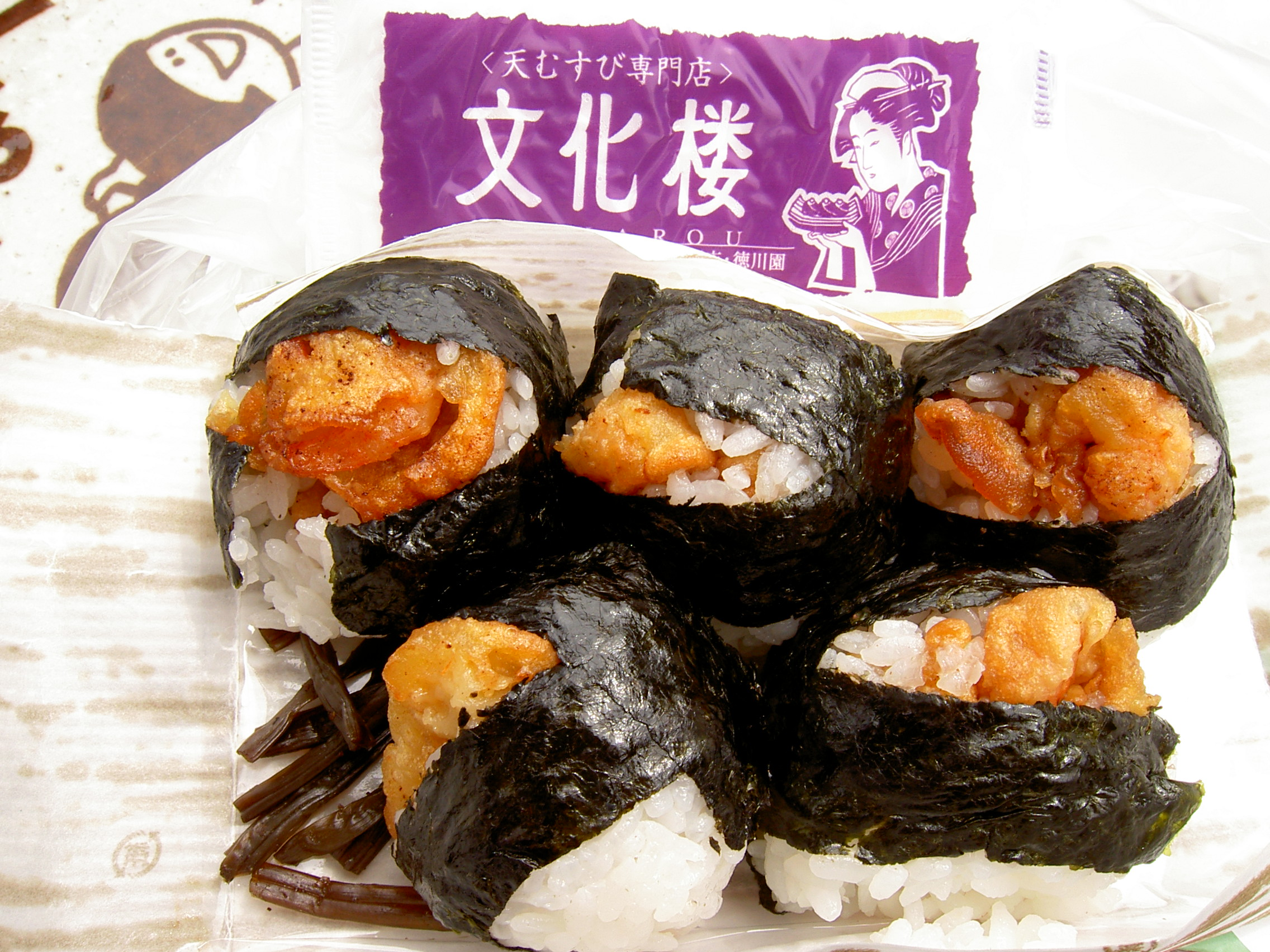
Tenmusu
