= Hitsumabushi =

Japanese eel dish

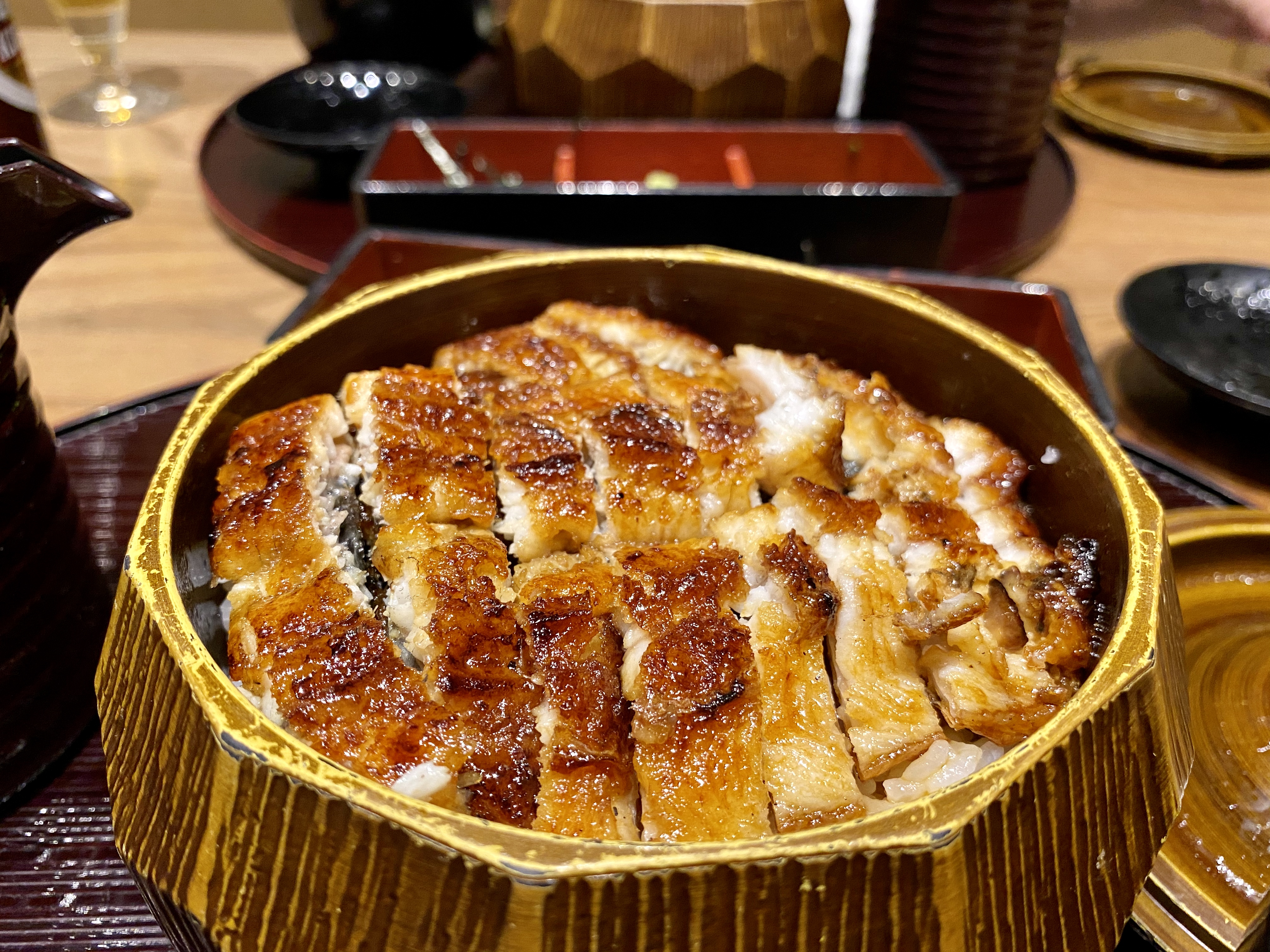
- Alternative names: ひつまぶし
- Region or state: Tōkai region

Hitsumabushi (ひつまぶし) is a local dish of Japan, consisting of sliced unagi (eel) grilled in kabayaki style on rice. Hitsumabushi became common in the 1950s, when farm-raised eel became widely available. It is considered one of the representative dishes of Nagoya cuisine.

== How to eat ==
The grilled eel and rice dish can be eaten three ways. Typically, the first serving is eaten as is, just the eel and rice; the second serving is eaten with toppings such as negi, wasabi, nori, and/or mitsuba; the third serving is eaten with dashi or green tea poured over the eel and rice, in addition to the other toppings, to make chazuke. This method is often called tabekurabe (食べ比べ; "eat-and-compare").

== History ==
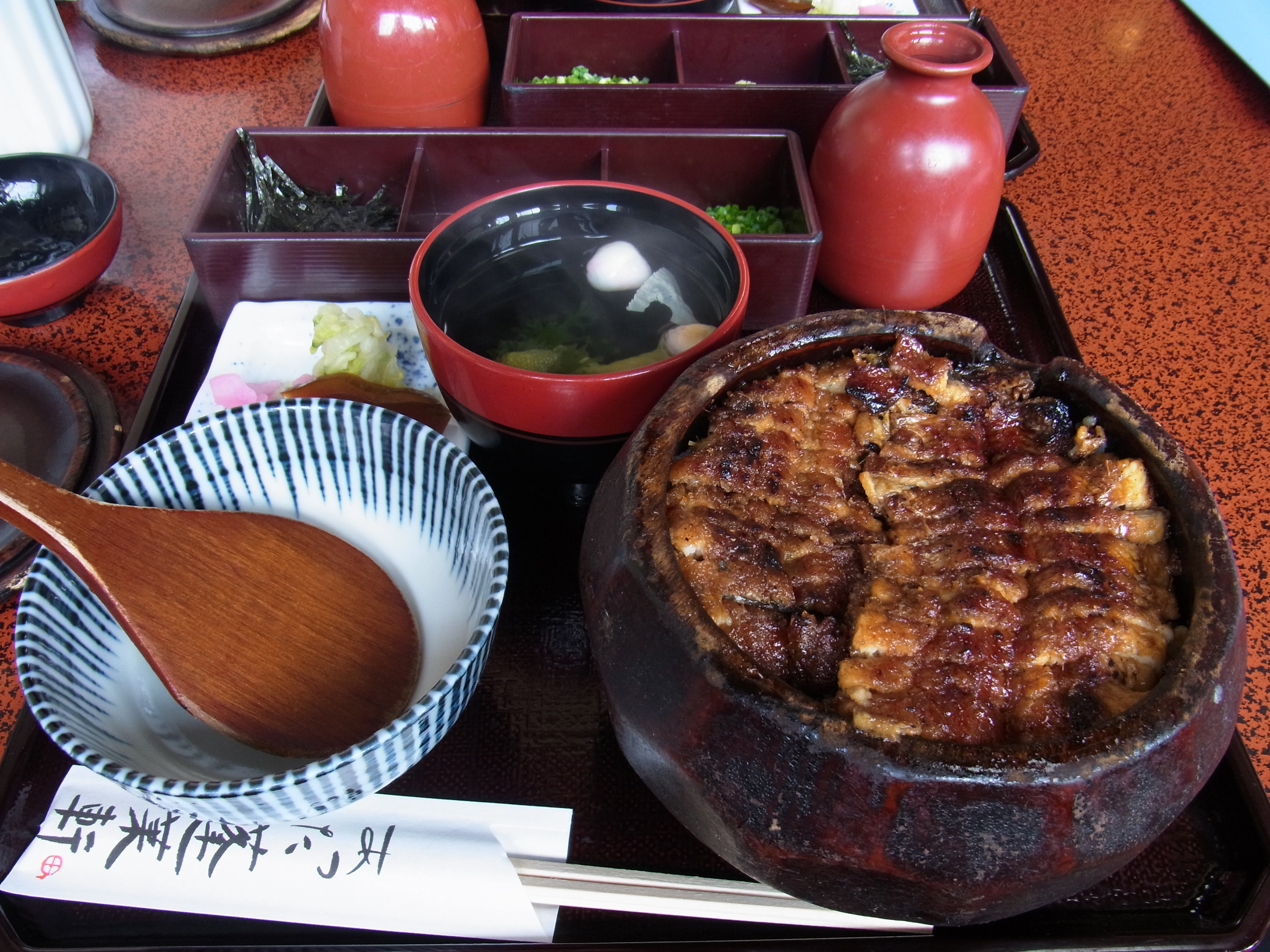
Hitsumabushi from Atsuta Houraiken

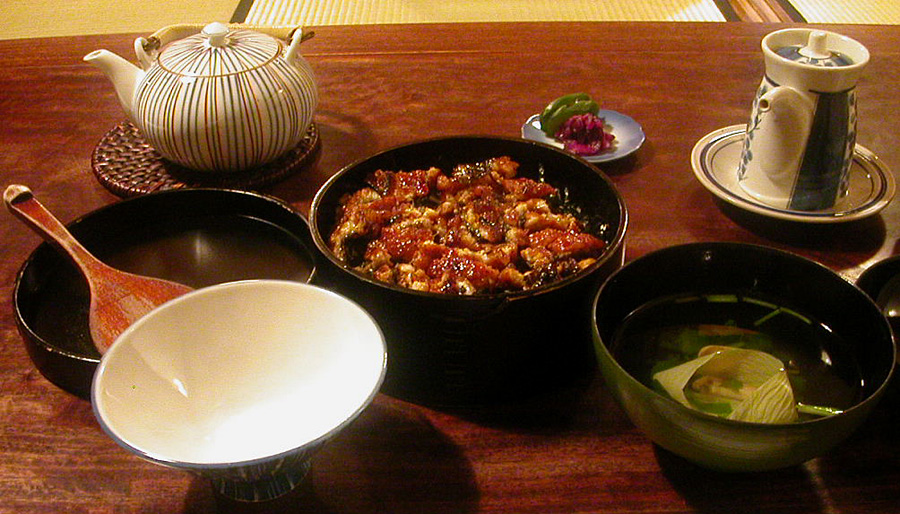
Hitsumabushi from Ibasho

The origins of this cuisine and when it came to be called hitsumabushi are not exactly known. The prevailing theory is that it originated in a Ryōtei restaurant in Nagoya, but some say it originated in Tsu City, Mie Prefecture. Others believe that it originated in the Kansai region.

=== Nagoya origin theory ===
One such restaurant that claims to be the originator is "Atsuta Houraiken" in Atsuta-ku, Nagoya, or "Iba sho" in Naka-ku, Nagoya.

"Atsuta Houraiken" dates the establishment of hitsumabushi to the Meiji period. "Atsuta Houraiken" served unagi rice in pottery bowls at that time, but since there were many deliveries and delivery staff often broke empty bowls when they return. Therefore, the bowls were placed in large, break-proof wooden tubs. The restaurant also added a plate for the number of people to share the bowl with. In 1985, "Atsuta Houraiken" applied to register hitsumabushi as a trademark with the Japan Patent Office, and it was registered in 1987 (see below).

"Ibasyo" states that hitsumabushi was established in the Taishō era. A description of hitsumabushi can be found in the "Ibasho" section of the "Nagoya Mikaku Map" published by Sogensha in 1964.

=== Tsu origin theory ===
According to a restaurant founded in 1875 in Tsu, Mie, before eel farming began, they used natural eels, which were of uneven size. The thicker ones were too hard to serve to customers. It would have been a waste to dispose of them, so they were grilled and chopped into small pieces for the employees' meals. The smell of the fish would linger if it was grilled too quickly, so it is assumed that they added condiments and made it into chazuke (rice with green tea). In other words, it was something they had no choice but to eat at that time. The owner of the restaurant heard that it was offered in Nagoya and started offering it as a menu item around 1975, and several restaurants in Tsu also started offering it after receiving inquiries about hitsumabushi.

=== Other theories ===
Some believe the dish originated prior to the Meiji era.

A book published in Tokyo in 1926, Spring, Summer, Autumn, Winter Daily Dishes, does not mention the word hitsumabushi, but describes a dish in which grilled eel is cut into 2–3 bu (3–9 mm), placed on freshly cooked rice, and stirred with a liquid of soy sauce, mirin and coarse sugar boiled down.

Some people attribute it to the period of food shortages after World War II. The author of the article, however, later changed the term to "apparently prewar period".

== Naming ==
Several hypotheses have been raised as to the origin of the name hitsumabushi.

- The theory that it is because it is spread (mabusu in Japanese) on rice in a tub (hitsu in Japanese.)
- According to the Morisada Mankou (守貞漫稿) written in the 19th century, eel bowls were called mabushi in the Kansai region. If this is the origin of the word hitsu-mabushi, then it has been in use since the 19 century. However, there is a view that this is coincidental and has nothing to do with hitsumabushi.

== Trademark ==
Hitsumabushi is a registered trademark of Nagoya-based Houraiken Corporation, filed in 1985 and registered in 1987. However, this does not mean that Houraiken is the originator of hitsumabushi. In addition, this was registered as a product, and "offering food and drink" was not subject to registration at the time of application. After this category became eligible for registration, Houraiken applied for a trademark for "offering food and drink", but the Japan Patent Office rejected the application, stating that "most eel restaurants in Nagoya add this to their menus, and it is known throughout the country as a Nagoya specialty."

== See also ==
- Eel as food
- Unadon
