= Freshwater eel poaching and smuggling =

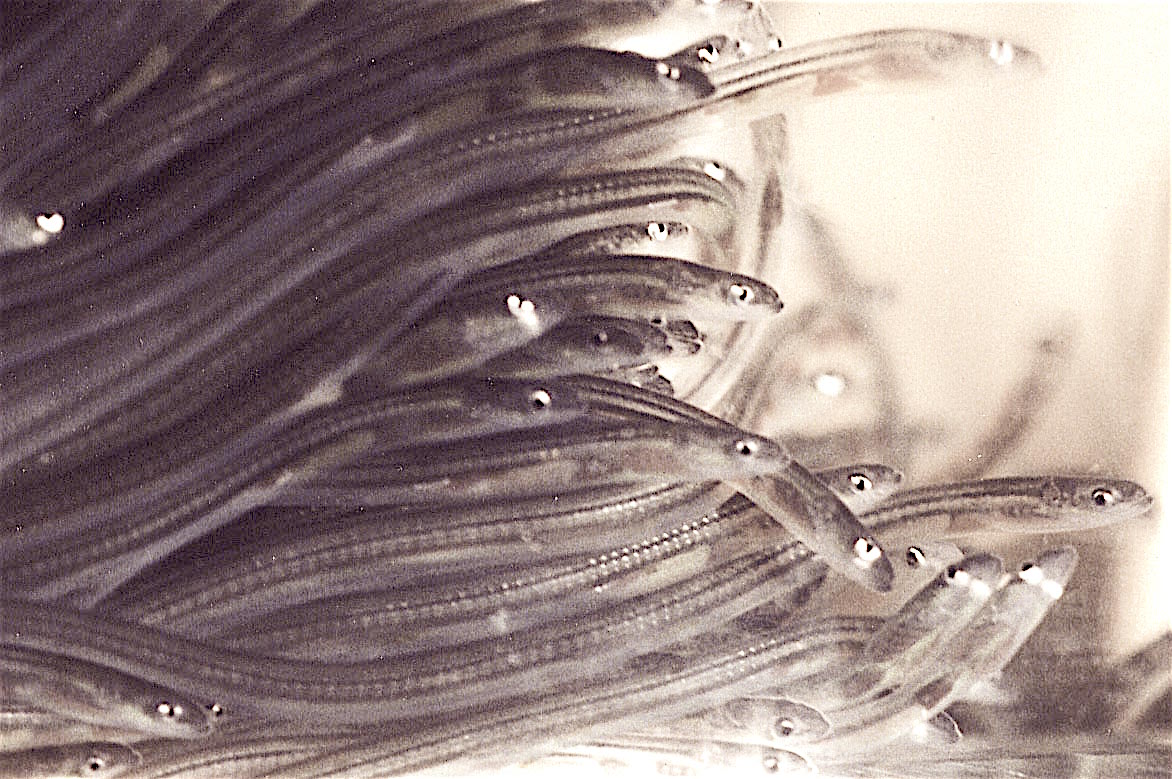
Glass eels

Freshwater eel poaching and smuggling have emerged in recent years as a direct response to the sustained popularity of eels as food combined with the eels' low population, endangered status, and subsequent protections. Freshwater eel are elongated fish in the Anguillidae family of ray-finned fish. The three most commonly consumed eel species are the Japanese eel (A. japonica), European eel (A. anguilla), and American eel ( A. rostrata).

The life cycle for eels has not been closed in captivity on a sustainable level, and any eel farms rely entirely on wild-caught elvers (juvenile eels). These elvers are caught from their native ranges in North America and Europe and are smuggled into East Asian eel farms, where they are often relabeled as the native Japanese eel to subvert legislation. The eels are smuggled disguised as other cargo, such as luggage or other meat products.

== Endangerment ==
The endangerment of freshwater eels is a crisis driven by a combination of biological vulnerability and intense human demand.

Global populations of freshwater species have declined by an average of 84% since 1970 according to the World Wildlife Fund (WWF). The European eel is currently listed as "Critically Endangered" by the IUCN, while the Japanese eel and the American eel also face threats.

A primary factor in their endangerment is their unique life cycle, which as mentioned above, has not yet been closed in captivity on a commercial scale. Consequently, the global aquaculture industry relies entirely on wild-caught juvenile eels. This creates a bottleneck where demand for food directly depletes wild stocks. The decline is further exacerbated by habitat loss, pollution, and climate change, but the thriving illegal trade remains a critical contributor. Despite legislations put in place mentioned below, they continue to be trafficked to Asia to meet consumer demand.

== Legislation ==
The EU placed a ban on import and export of European eels in 2010.

In the US, the only states that are allowed to harvest glass eels are Maine and South Carolina, though Maine is the only one reporting a significant harvest. Market price for glass eels "has risen to more than $2,000 per pound, although in 2014 prices were recorded between $400 and $650 per pound."

In Japan, on 4 December 2020, Japan's The National Diet placed a "ban [on] the importation of illegal, unreported, and unregulated (IUU) seafood." Japan's Fisheries Agency is planning on raising the fine for smuggling of glass eels "from ¥100,000 to ¥30 million starting in 2023, in a bid to stem a source of funding of organized crime syndicates" and increasing the "maximum period of imprisonment for glass eel poaching...[from] six months to three years."

== Smuggling and arrests ==
In order to continue to feed the demand for freshwater eel, poachers began smuggling eels from North American and Europe to stock eel farms in East Asia.

In the 2018-19 fishing season, EUROPOL seized "5 789 kg of smuggled glass eels with an estimated value of € 2 000 per kilo" under the European Union Action Plan against wildlife trafficking.

2019's Operation Fame resulted in 43 arrests and the seizure of 737 kg of glass eels. The fish were in route to Asia and were camouflaged among other cargo, often other meat.

2019's Operation Broken Glass, led by the U.S. Fish and Wildlife Service, led to the arrests of 19 smugglers. All of the smugglers were charged with violations of the Lacey Act, and were believed to be responsible for over $7 million in illegal elver sales.

In 2018, Canadian authorities intercepted 18 tons of eel meat arriving from Asian eel farms, all of which were suspected to be poached from Europe originally, raised in Asian eel farms, and destined to be sold on the North American market. In 2024, Canada's Department of Fisheries and Oceans seized around $500,000 worth of baby eels from Pearson Airport.

EUROPOL's Operation Lake ran from October 2018 to April 2020 and resulted in the arrest of 108 elver smugglers and the seizure of 6.2 million euros worth of elvers.

== The Pipeline Model ==
The illegal trade in European eels is often described using a "pipeline model", which categorizes the illicit flow into distinct stages: extraction, gathering, handling, smuggling, and processing. This trade involves a complex network of actors ranging from local poachers to multinational Asian crime syndicates.

- Extraction and Gathering: The chain begins with extraction, where glass eels are caught by both licensed fishermen exceeding quotas and illegal poachers. For example, in France and Portugal, organized poaching groups use prohibited nets and operate at night to evade authorities. These catches are then given to "collectors" who move the live fish quickly to avoid detection.
- Handling and Middlemen: Middlemen play a crucial role in the handling stage. They often own legitimate fish trading businesses, which are used to launder illegal catches. They provide the necessary infrastructure, such as refrigerated trucks and storage ponds, to keep the eels alive.
- Smuggling: To move eels from Europe to Asia, traffickers employ various methods. A common technique involves "fish mules" who smuggle live eels in oxygenated plastic bags packed into suitcases with thermal blankets. However, recent crackdowns have forced a shift toward concealing eels in air freight cargo, often hidden behind legal fresh produce. Traffickers also use transit hubs in neighboring non-EU countries to obscure the eels origin before flying to Asia.
- Processing: Once in Asia, the European eels are farmed until maturity. Then they are processed, and re-exported globally as prepared eel meat. DNA tests have revealed that a significant portion of eel products sold in places such as Hong Kong came from endangered European eels, mislabeled as American or Japanese species to bypass regulations.

== Relation to Illegal, Unreported, Unregulated (IUU) Fishing ==
The illegal trade in freshwater eels involves a convergence of smuggling and Illegal, Unreported, and Unregulated (IUU) fishing, characterized by complex mutually benefitial relationships between legal and illegal actors. Rather than operating as a distinct underworld economy, eel trafficking relies on the infrastructure of the legitimate seafood industry to function.

This dynamic often manifests through funding and outsourcing. For instance, legitimate corporations have been known to provide poachers with specialized equipment, such as nets or exygenated suitcases, in exchange for illegal catches. By equipping these local groups, major Asian criminal syndicates can ensure a steady supply of glass eels while outsourcing the riskiest tasks to independent middlemen, insulating themselves from direct law enforcement.

Further, laundering techniques as mentioned above in 'The Pipeline Model', effectively "washes" the IUU catch, allowing critically endangered European eels to bypass international regulations and enter the global market as seemingly legal products. This deep integration into the "upperworld" economy means that poached eels can be consumed without the final consumer ever suspecting their illegal origin.
