= Midsummer Ox Day =

Day of the Japanese calendar

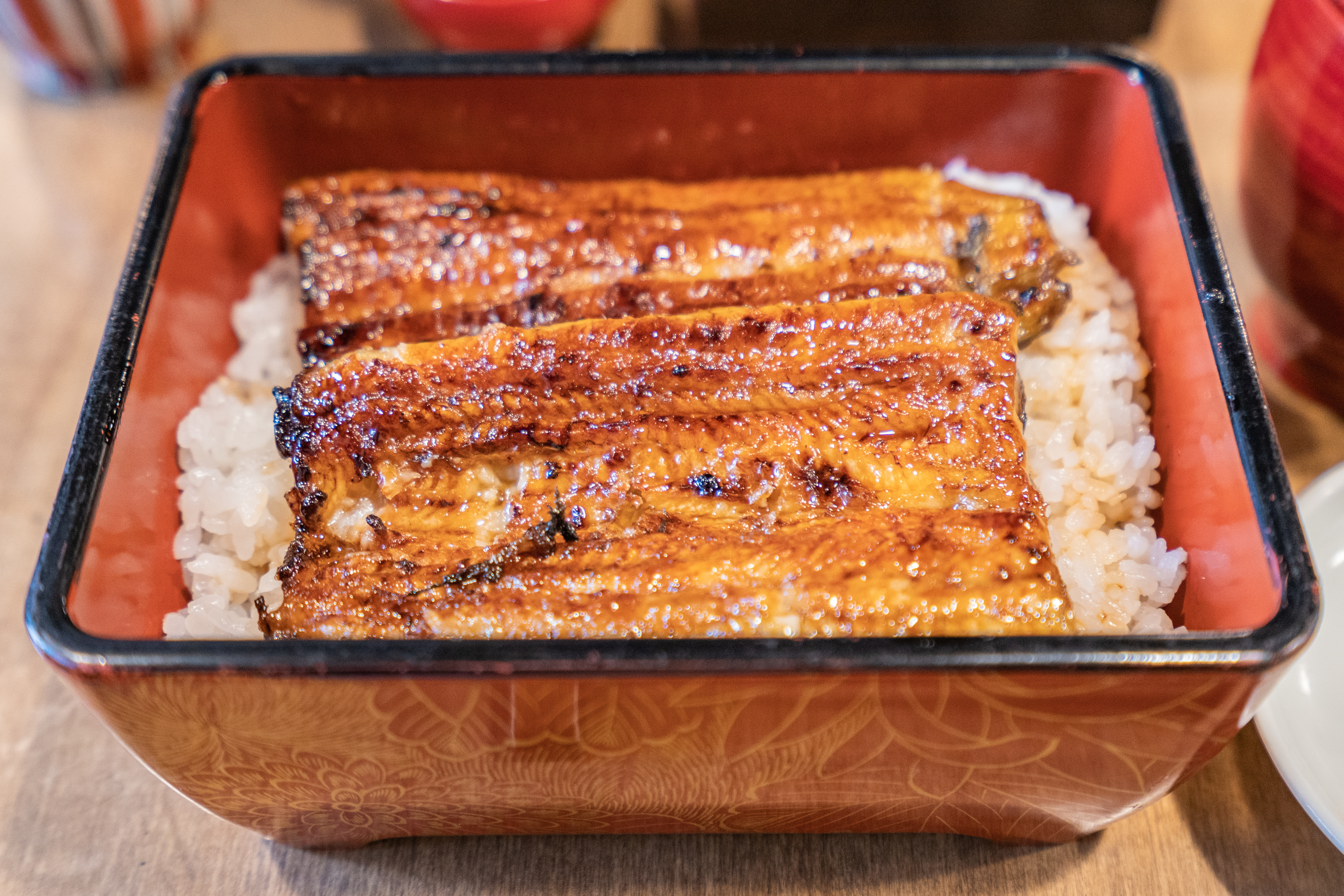
Grilled eel

Midsummer Ox Day (土用の丑の日, Doyō no ushi no hi) is the day associated with the Ox sign in the traditional Japanese calendar. The most famous Ox Day in Japan (one or two days with an interval of 12 days) are on the hottest time of the year (late July – early August), which is also characterized by high humidity. The main dish of this day is kabayaki, baked or fried eel (unagi) with sweet teriyaki sauce. This high-fat food is said to help maintain strength during this hot season.

== Origin of tradition ==
The earliest mention of the association of cooked eel with summer heat is in the Man'yōshū anthology of Japanese poetry (8th century). In Otomono Yakamochi's poem, it is explained that in order not to lose weight due to the summer heat, cooked eel will be beneficial for health.

Year	First day	Second day
2004	21 July	2 August
2005	28 July	
2006	23 July	4 August
2007	30 July	
2008	24 July	5 August
2009	19 July	31 July
2010	26 July	
2011	21 July	2 August
2012	27 July	
2013	22 July	3 August
2014	29 July	
2015	24 July	5 August
2016	30 July	
2017	25 July	6 August
2018	20 July	1 August
2019	27 July	
2020	21 July	2 August
2021	28 July	
2022	23 July	4 August
2023	30 July	
2024	24 July	5 August
2025	19 July	31 July
2026	26 July	
2027	21 July	2 August
