= Unadon =

Japanese rice dish topped with eel filets

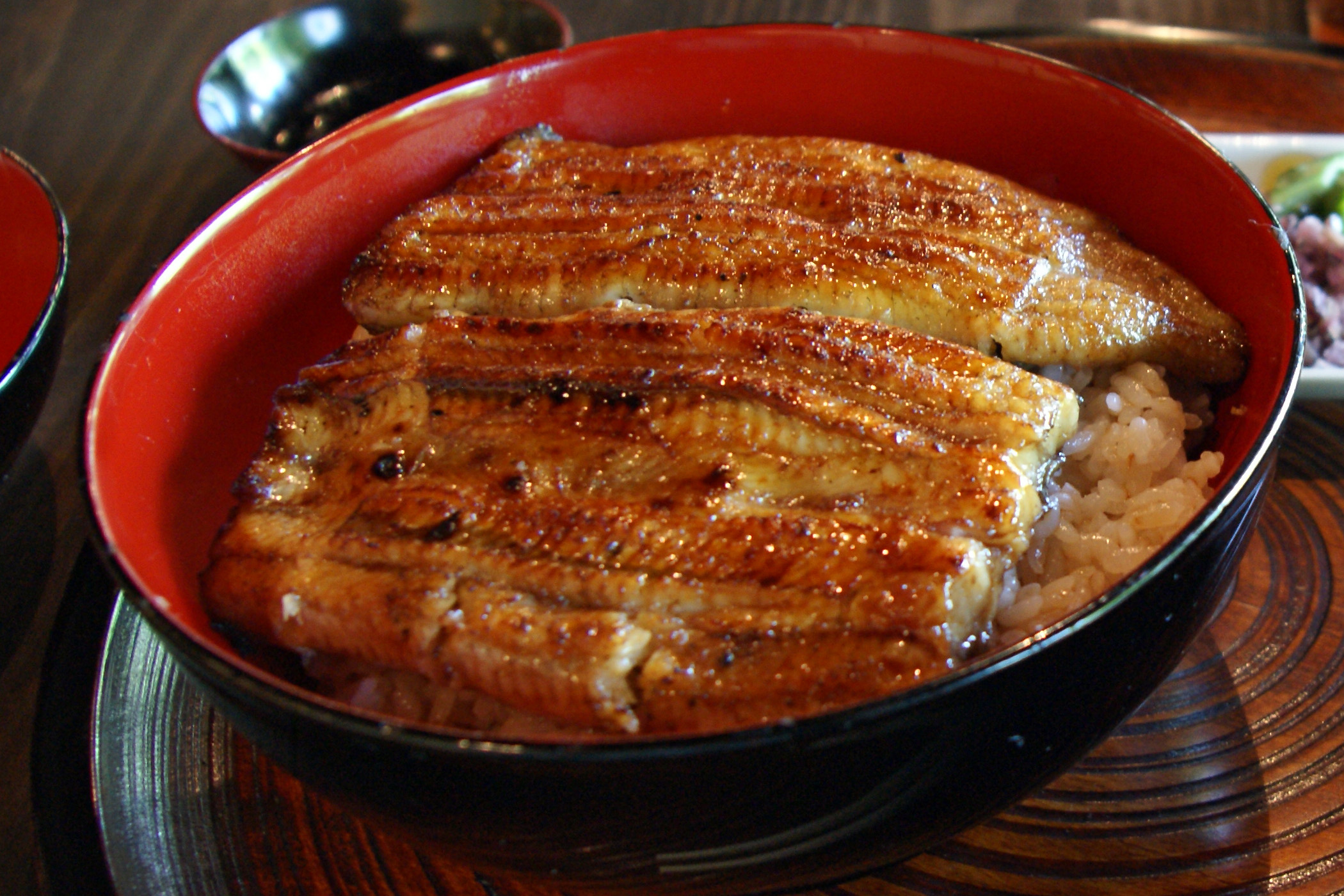
Unadon

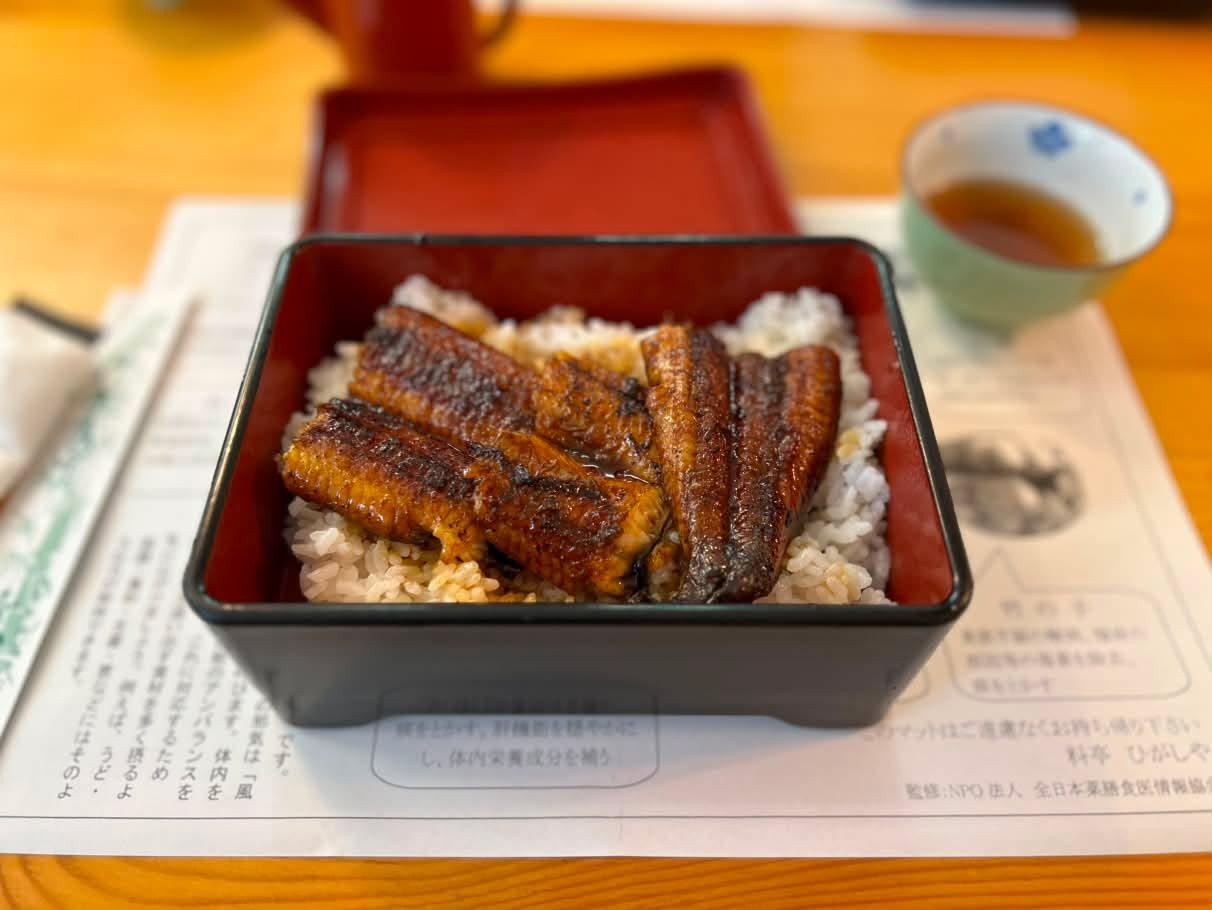
unaju

Unadon (鰻丼; an abbreviation for unagi donburi, "eel bowl") is a dish originating in Japan. It consists of a donburi type large bowl filled with steamed white rice, and topped with fillets of eel (unagi) grilled in a style known as kabayaki, similar to teriyaki. The fillets are glazed with a sweetened soy-based sauce, called tare and caramelized, preferably over charcoal fire. The fillets are not flayed, and the grayish skin side is placed faced down. Sufficient tare sauce is poured over so that some of it seeps through the rice underneath. By convention, pulverized dried berries of sanshō (called Japanese pepper, although botanically unrelated) are sprinkled on top as seasoning. It is also very popular outside of Japan, particularly in Taiwan and the United States.

The places in Japan renowned for unadon include Hamamatsu, Nagoya, Saitama City (Urawa), Narita, Chiba, and Yanagawa, Fukuoka.

== Variations ==
Variations include unajū (鰻重, the same dish served in jūbako (重箱), food boxes often lacquered), nagayaki (長焼き, the eel and rice are served separately), and hitsumabushi (ひつまぶし, finely chopped eel kabayaki scattered (mabusu) over rice in a wooden rice container (hitsu) from Nagoya).

There are two styles of grilled eel, the topic of which is covered more precisely under kabayaki. Essentially, in the Kantō region style, the eel is steamed before being grilled with sauce, which makes the eel more tender. The other is the Kansai region style, which is grilled without steaming.

== History ==
Una-don was the first type of donburi rice dish, invented in the late Edo period, during the Bunka era (1804–1818) by a man named Ōkubo Imasuke of Sakai-machi (in present-day Nihonbashi Ningyōchō, Chūō, Tokyo), and became a hit in the neighborhood, where the Nakamura-za and Ichimura-za once stood.

The first eatery to sell it as a business is claimed to be Ōnoya (大野屋), in Fukiyachō (葺屋町) (adjacent to Sakai-chō) at some indeterminate time, but presumably before the theaters burnt down in 1841 and moved off. After the great famine of 1844, it started selling the unadon for one oblong Tenpō-sen coin, and became a hit.

As for unajū, where the eel and rice is stuffed in jūbako boxes, one theory ascribes its originator to one Gihei (大谷儀兵衛), who started a freshwater fish restaurant business in Sanya, Asakusa, Tokyo, called Funagi (鮒儀) (later known as Jūbako, the current generation of the restaurant is in Akasaka). According to this version the unajū was already around by late Edo period, but there are detractors to this view. Other commentators say unajū appeared in the Taishō era, and by using lacquered boxes, aimed at appearance of luxury. Unajū is usually pricier than unadon.

== See also ==
- Katsudon
- Gyūdon
