= Kabayaki =

Japanese eel dish

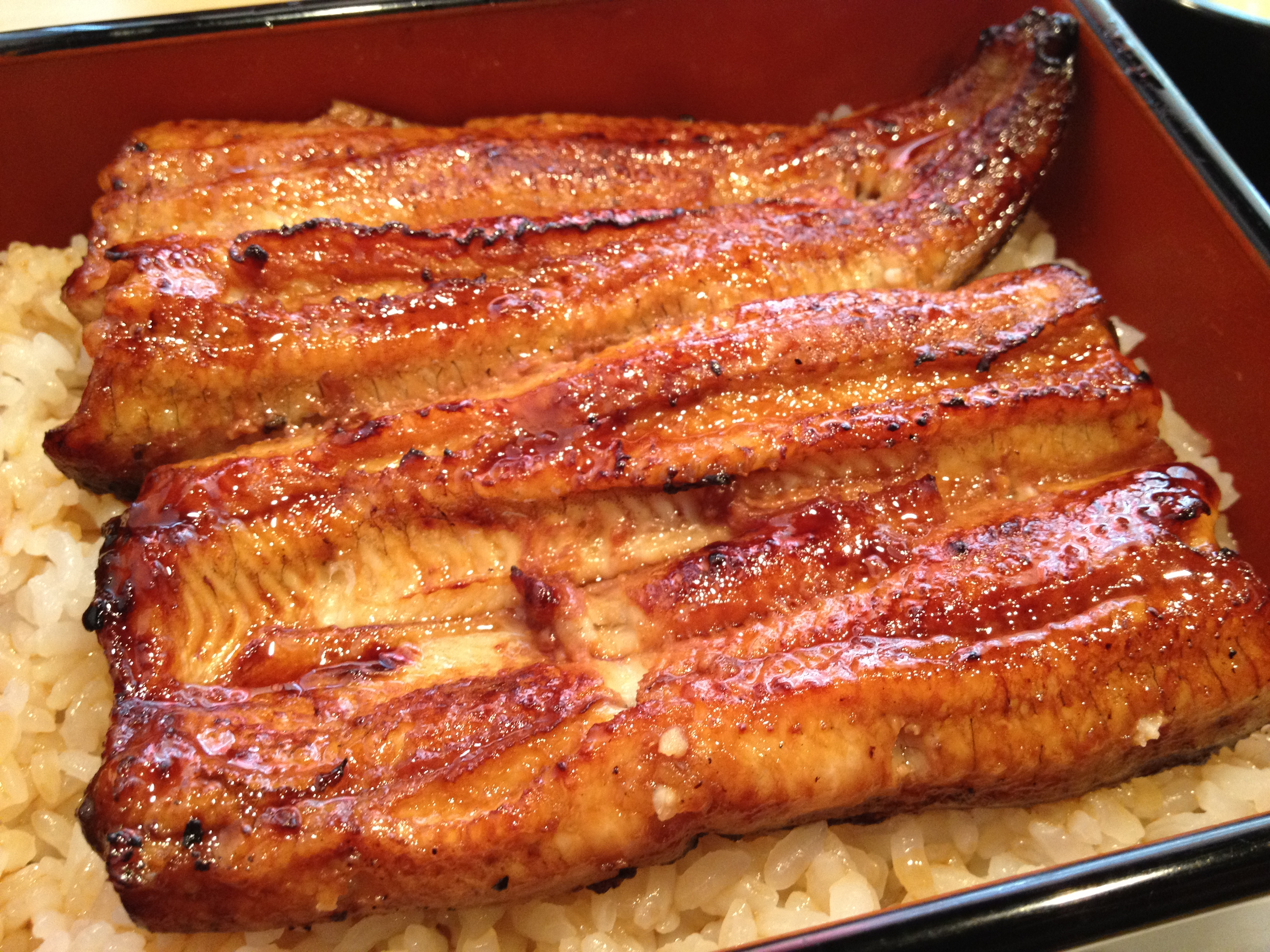
Eel kabayaki on rice

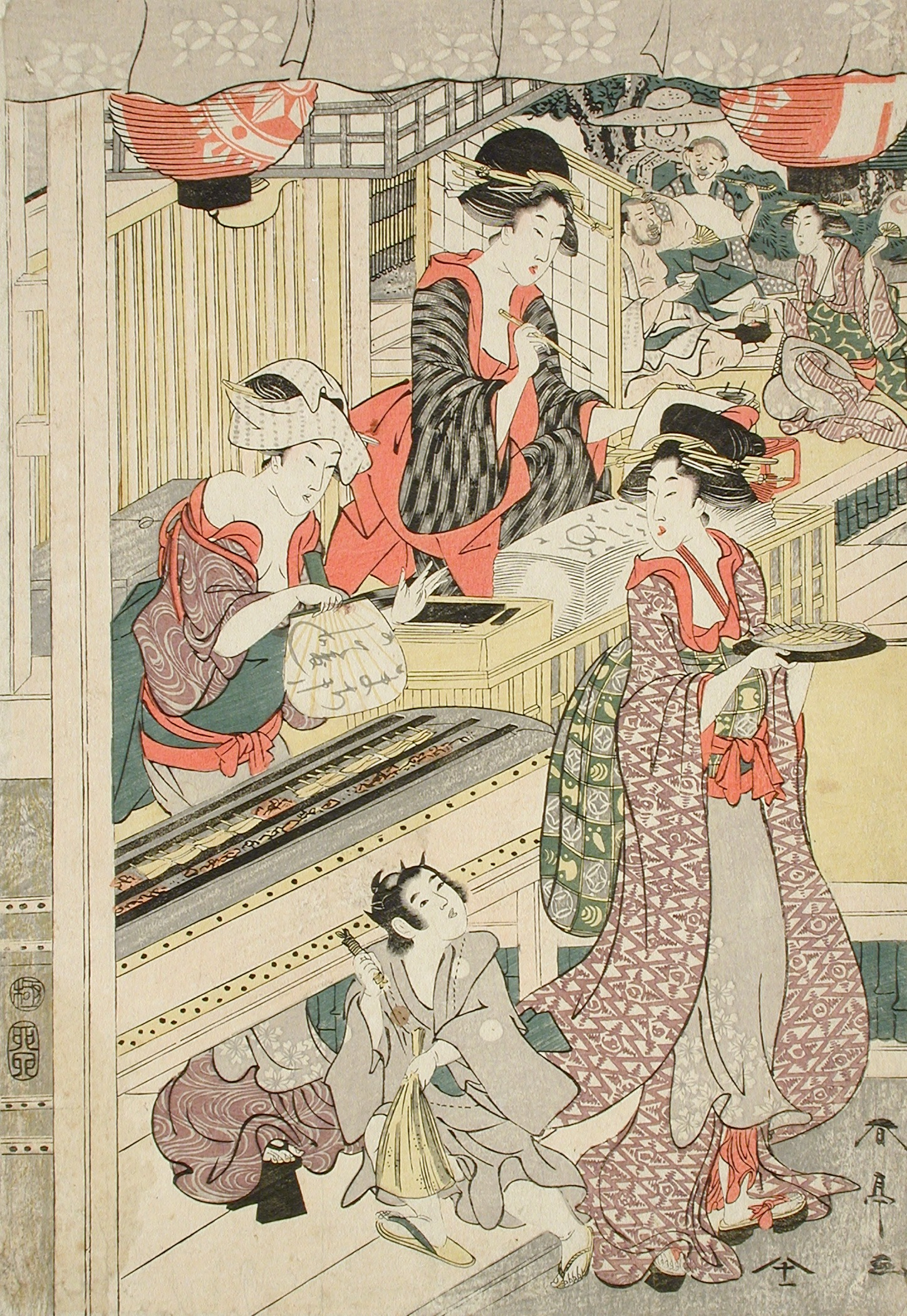
Eel kabayaki shop. Ukiyoe by Katsukawa Shuntei, 1804–1810

Kabayaki (蒲焼) is a preparation of fish, especially unagi eel, where the fish is split down the back (or belly), gutted and boned, butterflied, cut into square fillets, skewered, and dipped in a sweet soy sauce-based marinade before being cooked on a grill or griddle.

Besides unagi, the same preparation is made of other long scaleless fish such as hamo (pike conger), dojō (loach), catfish, anago (conger eel), and gimpo (ギンポ) (gunnels). One can also find canned products labeled as kabayaki-style sanma (Pacific saury).

Kabayaki eel is very popular and a rich source of vitamins A and E, and omega-3 fatty acids. A popular custom from the Edo period calls for eating kabayaki during the summer to gain stamina, especially on a mid-summer day called Midsummer Ox Day (doyō-no ushi-no-hi (土用の丑の日),) which falls between July 18 and August 8 each year.

The eel kabayaki is often served on top of a bowl (donburi) of rice, and called unadon, the fancier form of which is the unajū, placed inside a lacquered box called Jūbako. It is also torn up and mixed up evenly with rice to make hitsumabushi (ひつまぶし), which is enjoyed especially in the Nagoya area.

== Kantō vs. Kansai ==
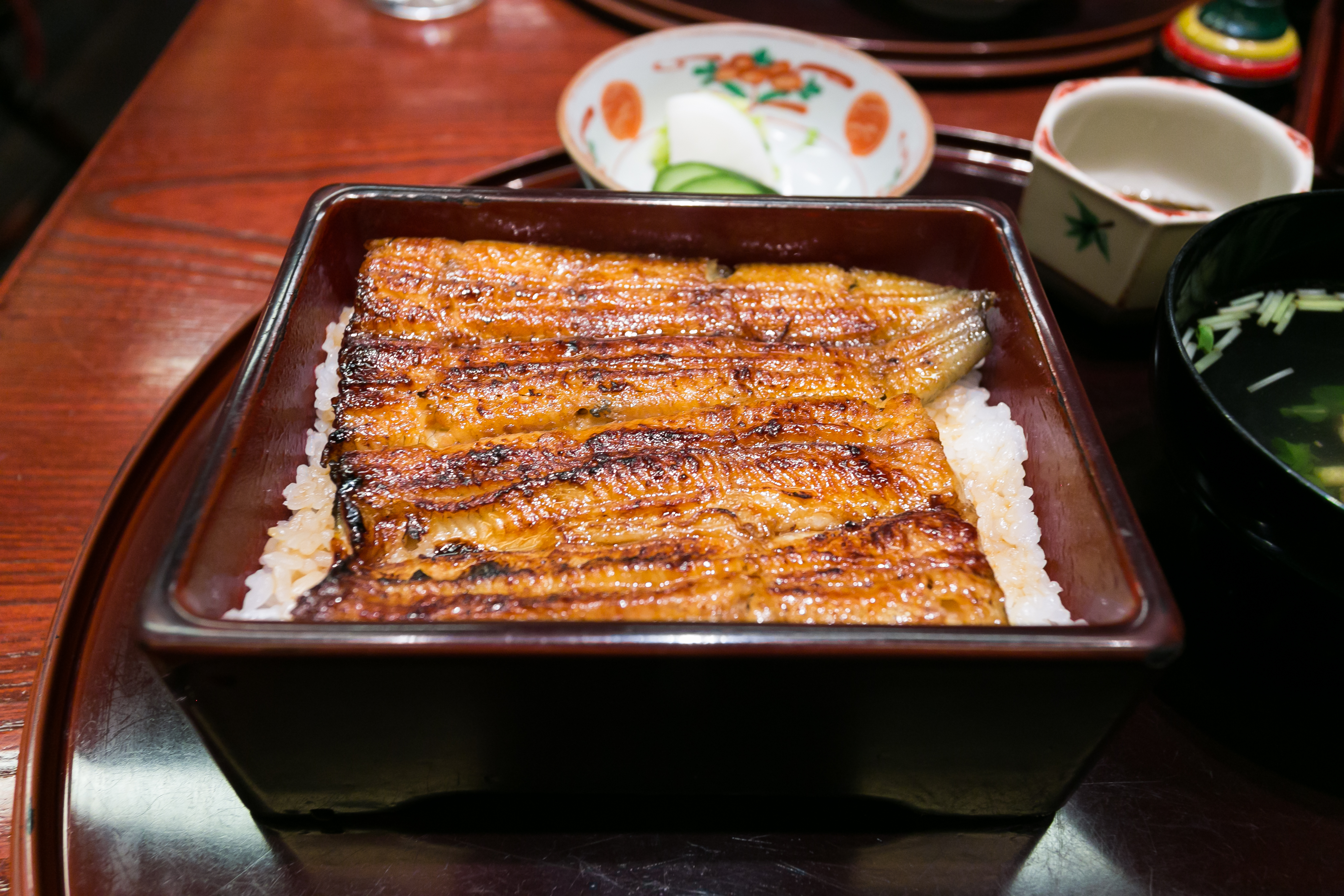
Unaju, a Japanese dish which contains eel kabayaki on rice

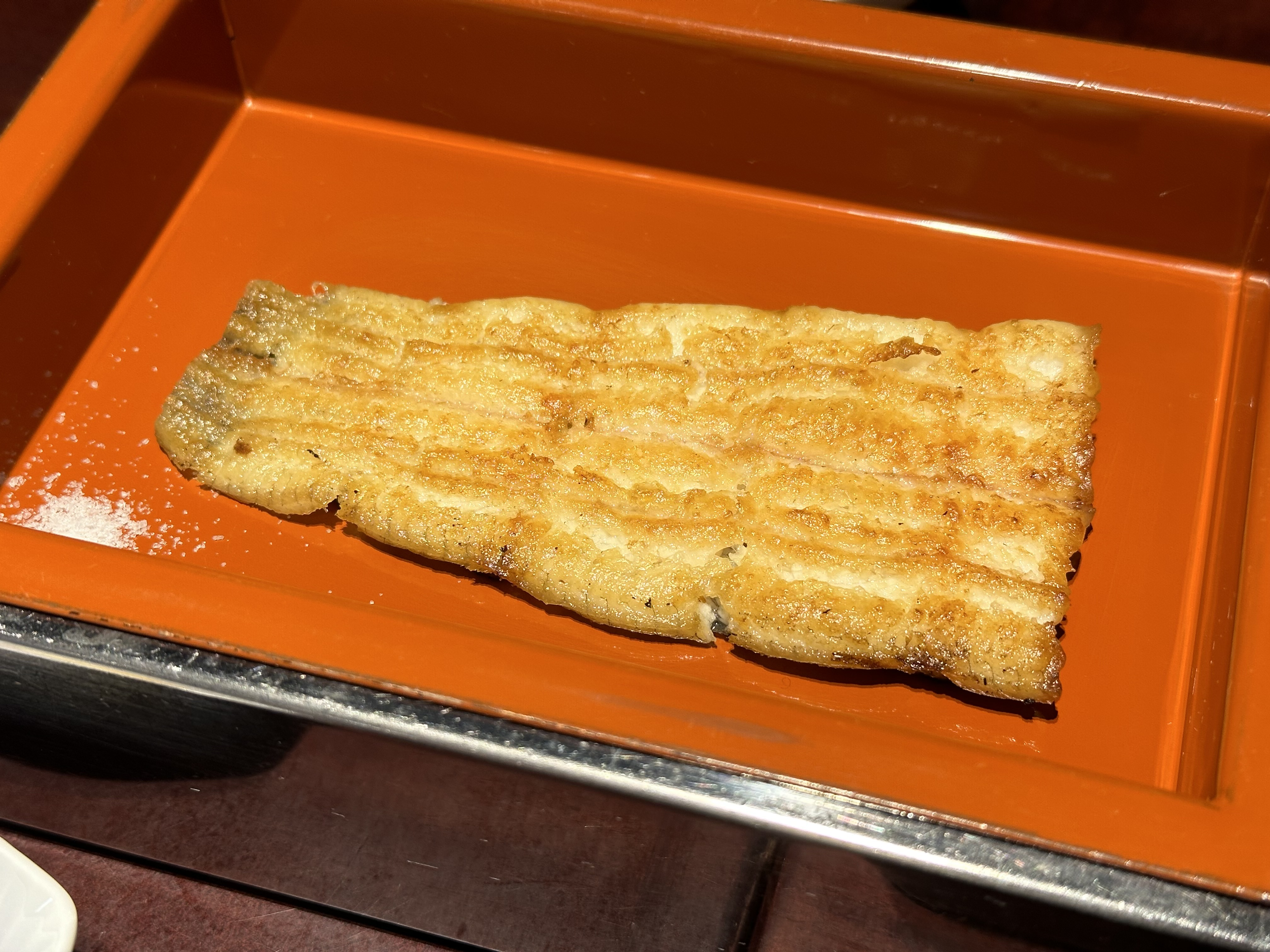
Shirayaki, grilled eel

Broadly, two schools of cooking kabayaki exist. In the Kantō region (eastern Japan), the eel is slit down its back and butterflied, so a lighter-colored stripe of the belly runs down the middle of each fillet on the skin side. The long eel is cut into shorter, squarer fillets and skewered. In Kanto, the skewered eel is first grilled, plain, into what is known as shirayaki (白焼き or 素焼き), then steamed, before being flavored and grilled again; as a result, it turns out more tender and flakier after grilling.

In the Kansai region (western Japan), the eel is slit down the belly and directly grilled without being steamed, often still in their original length, and called nagayaki (長焼き). The outer skin can be tough and chewy, so eel cooked in Kansai style may be placed between layers of hot rice, for the steam to help tenderize it.

In the Kansai area, the eel is often called mamushi, just like the name of the common viper in Japan, Gloydius blomhoffii. Some speculate the name is a corruption of mabushi meaning "besprinkle", while others say it is a reference to the eel being rather similar to the viper in shape and vigor-endowing abilities when consumed.

== Etymology ==
Several hypothesized origins for the name kabayaki are given. The name came to be generally written using the kanji 蒲焼 meaning cattail-grilled. Resemblance to the brown plush flower spikes of the cattail plant has been suggested as etymological origin in several old writings (Zokugo kō (『俗語考』; "Considerations on colloquial words"); the writings of Mankō Morisada; Kinsei jibutsu kō (『近世事物考』; "Considerations on near modern age items")). Food historian Tekishū Motoyama (ja:本山荻舟) (1881–1958) has argued that originally the whole eel was skewered vertically and cooked that way, giving rise to the name on the resemblance to the cattail both in form and color. This is incidentally the same as one hypothesized etymology for kamaboko.

Another touted theory explains the name as due to resemblance of the charred skin side to the kaba-kawa (樺皮; i.e. "beech-bark") (Yōshū fushi (『雍州府志』; "Record of Yamashiro province"), Honchō Seji Danki (『本朝世事談綺』; "Record of Yamashiro province"). Motoyama also notes a proposed etymology from kōbashī (香ばしい; "fragrant (esp. of toasted or roasted items)").
