= Tare sauce =

Family of Japanese sauces

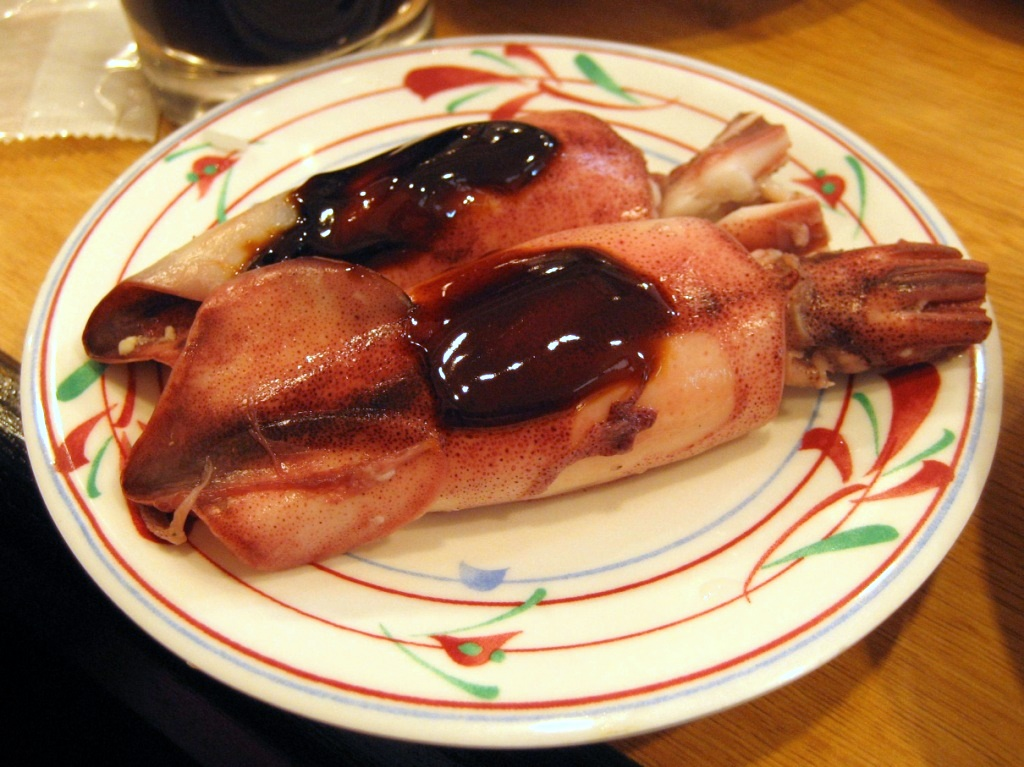
Ikameshi (squid stuffed with rice) topped with tare sauce

Tare (垂れ or タレ; Japanese pronunciation: [taɾe]), or tare sauce, is a type of dipping sauce used in Japanese cuisine. The sauce is best described as sweetened, thickened soy sauce for grilling and flavored soy sauce with dashi, vinegar, etc., for nabemono and nattō such as ponzu but every chef has their own variation. Tare sauce is traditionally made by mixing and heating soy sauce, sake and/or mirin, sugar and/or honey, and optional ingredients include oyster sauce and ginger. The sauce is boiled and reduced to the desired thickness, then used to marinate meat, which is then grilled or broiled, and the final dish may be garnished with spring onions.

Tare sauce is often used in grilling (yakitori and yakiniku, especially as teriyaki sauce) as well as with sushi, nabemono, and gyoza. It can also be used to make the soup for ramen by combining it with stock and/or broth in order to add to the complex combination of flavors, and as a braising liquid for meat (e.g. chāshū). Due to its use in glazing grilled eel (unagi), it is often called unagi no tare (うなぎのタレ) or eel sauce.

The word tare (タレ) is a generic term for different dipping sauces in Japanese. Other Japanese dipping sauces also locally called tare include salt tare (塩ダレ, shio-dare), a clear, salty sauce that contains lemon, salt, oil, and Welsh onions, and sesame tare (ゴマだれ, goma-dare), a sauce that contains sesame seed, which is used in shabu-shabu and other dishes.

== See also ==
- Soy sauce
- Tonkatsu sauce
- Japanese mayonnaise
- Japanese Worcestershire sauce
