= Unagi =

Japanese word for freshwater eel

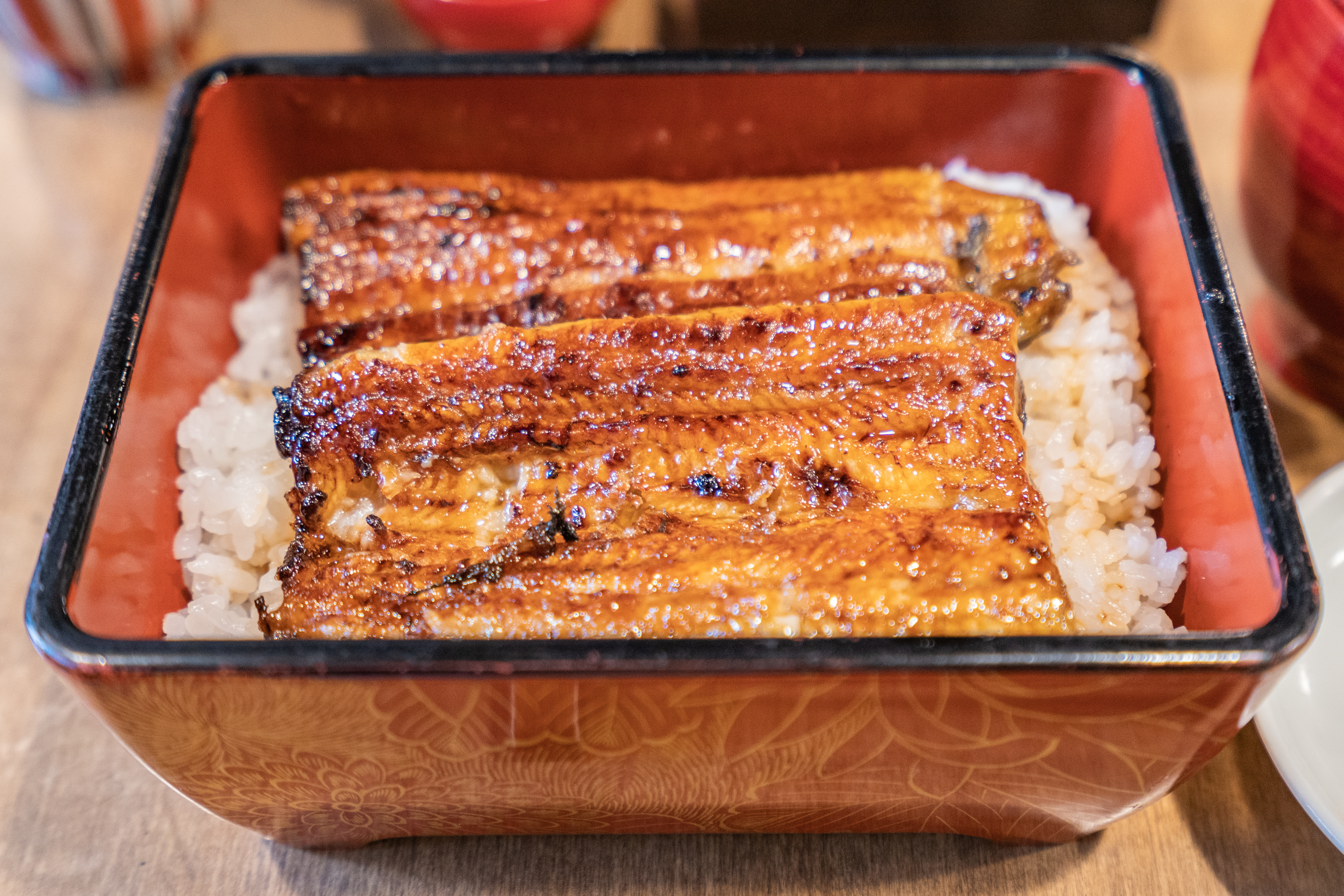
- Unaju, Japanese unagi cuisine
- Place of origin: Japan
- Main ingredients: Eel

Unagi (ウナギ) is the Japanese word for freshwater eel, particularly the Japanese eel, Anguilla japonica (日本鰻, nihon unagi). Unagi is a common ingredient in Japanese cooking, often as kabayaki. It is not to be confused with saltwater eel, which is known as anago in Japanese.

== In Japanese cuisine ==
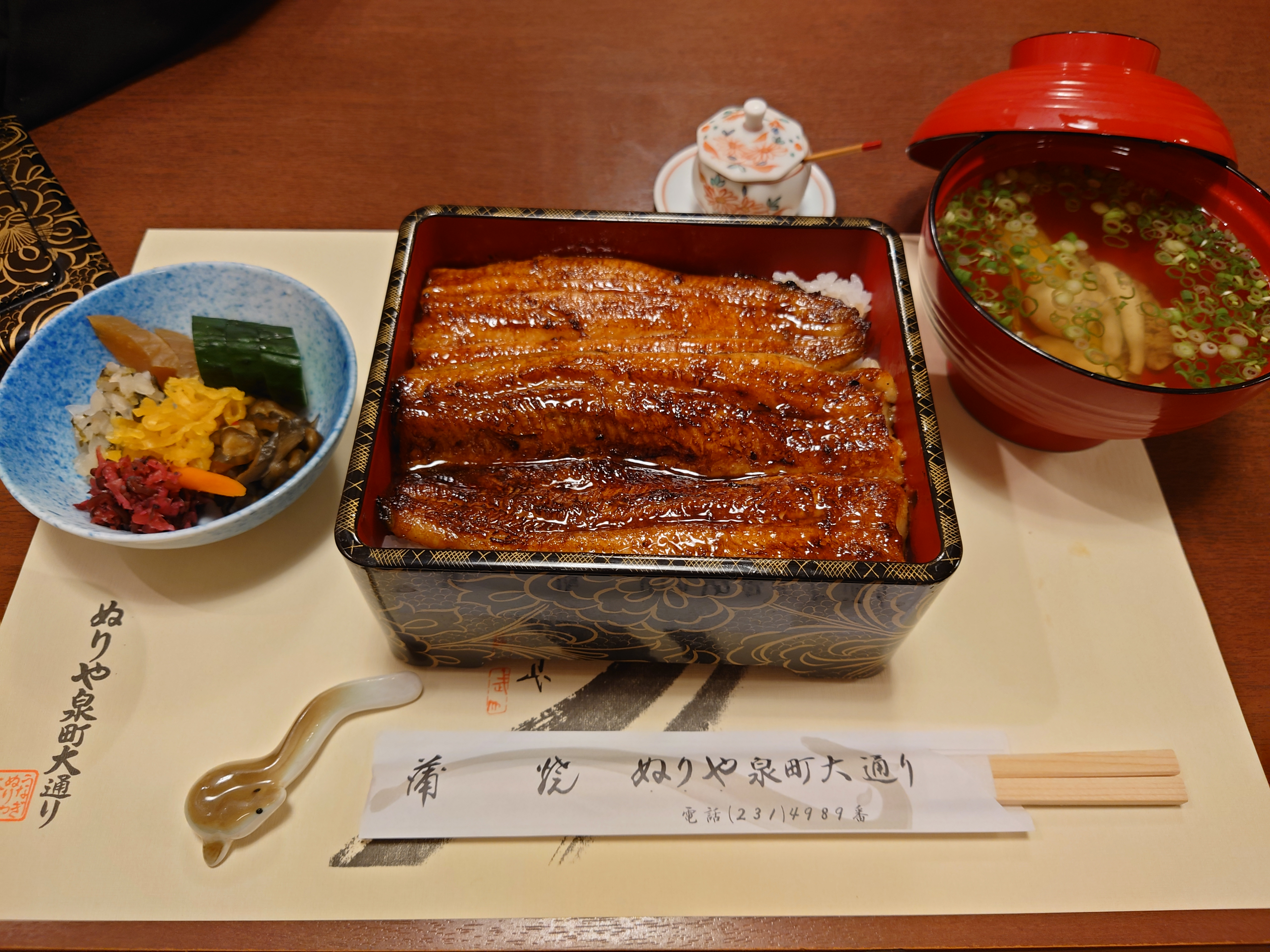
Unadon often comes with kimosui (liver soup)

Unagi is served as part of unadon (sometimes spelled unagidon, especially in menus in Japanese restaurants in Western countries), a donburi dish with sliced eel served on a bed of rice. A kind of sweet biscuit called unagi pie made with powdered unagi also exists. Unagi is high in protein, vitamin A, and calcium.

Specialist unagi restaurants are common in Japan, and commonly have signs showing the word unagi with hiragana う (transliterated u), which is the first letter of the word unagi. Lake Hamana in Hamamatsu city, Shizuoka prefecture is considered to be the home of the highest quality unagi; as a result, the lake is surrounded by many small restaurants specializing in various unagi dishes. Unagi is often eaten during the hot summers in Japan. There is even a special day for eating unagi, the Midsummer Ox Day (doyo no ushi no hi).

As eel is poisonous unless cooked, eels are always cooked; and in Japanese dishes they are often served grilled and basted with tare sauce, a cooking style known as kabayaki. Unagi that is roasted without tare and only seasoned with salt is known as shirayaki (白焼).

Unagi is also commonly served in nigiri style, where a slice of grilled and glazed eel is placed atop a small bed of sushi rice, often secured with a thin strip of nori. Unakyu is a common expression used for sushi containing eel and cucumber.

== Sustainability ==
Seafood Watch, a sustainable seafood advisory list, recommends that consumers avoid eating unagi due to significant pressures on worldwide freshwater eel populations. The dwindling population of unagi species are not only caused by overfishing, but also due to its complex lifecycle and vulnerability to climate change as well as man-made shifts in oceanic and inland environment.All three eel species used as unagi have seen their population sizes greatly reduced in the past half century. For example, catches of the European eel have declined about 80% since the 1960s. The Japanese Ministry of the Environment has officially added Japanese eel to the "endangered" category of the country's Red List of animals ranging from "threatened" to "extinct".

Although about 90% of freshwater eel consumed in the U.S. are farm-raised, they are not bred in captivity. Instead, young eels are collected from the wild and then raised in various enclosures. In addition to wild eel populations being reduced by this process, eels are often farmed in open net pens which allow parasites, waste products, and diseases to flow directly back into wild eel habitat, further threatening wild populations. Freshwater eels are carnivores and as such are fed other wild-caught fish, adding another element of unsustainability to current eel farming practices.

To avoid further declines in wild populations and to ensure sustainability, it is necessary to establish a closed-cycle aquaculture system in which unagi are raised from eggs to adulthood in a controlled environment, induced to spawn, and their offspring are then reared to maturity in successive generations. In 1973, Hokkaido University succeeded in hatching eel eggs in a laboratory for the first time in the world. Since the 1990s, research on the full life-cycle culture of unagi has been led primarily by the Japan Fisheries Research and Education Agency. In 2010, researchers achieved a world-first by successfully inducing spawning in captive-bred adult unagi that had themselves been raised from artificially obtained eggs.

As of 2016, the production cost per fully farmed unagi was approximately 40,000 yen. By 2026, this cost had been reduced to about 1,800 yen, or one twenty-second of the earlier figure. A key breakthrough in this method was the development of a low-cost feed derived from chicken eggs suitable for juvenile fish. Despite these advances, production costs remain roughly three times higher than those of conventional aquaculture, and further reductions are considered necessary for widespread commercial adoption.

In May 2026, Aeon Co., Ltd. began retail sales of fully farmed unagi, marking the first such commercial offering worldwide.
