= Longfin eel =

Longfin eel may refer to:

- African longfin eel
- Celebes longfin eel
- Highlands long-finned eel
- New Zealand longfin eel
- Polynesian longfinned eel
- Speckled longfin eel

== See also ==
- Short-finned eel
