= Marbled eel =

Marbled eel is a common name for several fishes; while it most commonly refers to Anguilla marmorata, it may also refer to:

- Anarchias seychellensis, Seychelles moray, or marbled reef-eel
- Anguilla marmorata, marbled eel or giant mottled eel
- Anguilla reinhardtii, marbled eel or speckled longfin eel
- Callechelys marmorata, marbled snake eel
- Gymnothorax obesus, speckled moray or marbled reef eel
- Lepophidium marmoratum, marbled brotula or marbled cusk-eel
- Muraenolepis marmorata, marbled moray cod or marbled eel-cod
- Mastacembelus vanderwaali, ocellated spiny eel or marbled spiny-eel
- Mastacembelus armatus, large spiny eel or marbled spiny eel
- Synbranchus marmoratus, marbled swamp eel or mottled swamp eel
- Torpedo sinuspersici, marbled electric eel or gulf torpedo, an electric ray
- Uropterygius marmoratus, marbled reef-eel, marbled eel or slender conger eel
