= Polynesian longfinned eel =

Conservation status
- Data Deficient (IUCN 3.1)

Scientific classification
- Kingdom: Animalia
- Phylum: Chordata
- Class: Actinopterygii
- Division: Teleostei
- Order: Anguilliformes
- Family: Anguillidae
- Genus: Anguilla
- Species: A. megastoma

Binomial name
- Anguilla megastoma Kaup, 1856

Species of fish

The Polynesian longfinned eel (Anguilla megastoma), also known as the Pacific long-finned eel, is an eel in the family Anguillidae. It was first described by Johann Jakob Kaup in 1856. A. megastoma is a tropical eel found in freshwaters in the Pacific, including Sulawesi, Indonesia; the Society Islands, and Pitcairn. The eels spend most of their lives in freshwater, but migrate to the ocean to breed.

== Description ==
Polynesian long-finned eels are typically gray, with some individuals appearing more red with varying amounts of brown or black spots, while the color fades to yellow and finally white reaching the ventral side. Small pectoral fins are placed behind the crescent-shaped gill slits, and the dorsal, caudal, and anal fin are fused to wrap around the elongate body of nearly constant width. The term “long-finned” refers to the fact that this combined fin will reach further along the body in long-finned eels than their short-finned counterparts. Their mouths are terminal with thick “lips” that extend past the eye. The lower jaw protrudes slightly compared to the upper jaw. They have a long snout with two tube nostrils at the end, similar to other long-finned eels like A. dieffenbachii, and have no operculum. Eyes are large and well developed with two small pores on the snout in front of each eye respectively. Like all Anguilla, the Polynesian long-finned eel has very small cycloid scales embedded in the skin, giving a smooth texture and appearance. Males can reach a maximum total length (TL) of 100 centimetres, while females can reach a maximum TL of 165 centimetres and a maximum weight of 9,000 grams. Similar to many freshwater eel species, the females grow larger than males.

== Distribution ==
The family Anguillidae refers to freshwater eels, and they are separated into two groups, tropical and temperate. A. megastoma are a tropical species native to the western Southern Pacific Ocean (WSP) and Indian Ocean, and the freshwaters of the encompassed islands, including French Polynesia, the Society Islands, New Caledonia, Sulawesi, and parts of Indonesia. While considered “freshwater” eels, Polynesian long-finned eels are catadromous, meaning they primarily live in freshwater, but travel to saltwater to spawn and where the next generation will live out their larval stage.

Their range overlaps with multiple other freshwater eel species, namely A. marmorata and A. reinhardtii. The freshwater on these islands is limited and potentially ephemeral, making sampling more difficult. As of 2011, there is evidence suggesting two primary populations of A. megastoma, one around Tahiti and the other further west near Samoa. The eastern population has a smaller number of total vertebrae (TV), with one study’s sample ranging from 108-114 and the western population ranging 110-116. The cause of this difference is yet to be determined, but in a related species, A. marmorata, a difference in TV has been linked with genetic differences between populations.^{[9]} The shape and scope of A. megastoma’s range is similar to that of A. obscura, but it is shifted slightly eastward, which could be evidence of population structure difference between the two species.

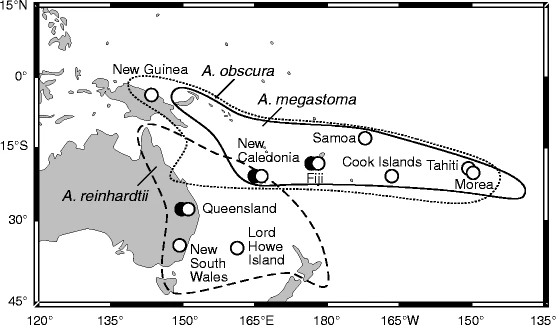
Range of three species of freshwater eels

While the range of A. megastoma overlaps A. obscura in the WSP, more is still to be learned about their specific migration loop from freshwater to saltwater.

== Life History ==
Not much is known about the unique biological aspects of the Polynesian long-finned eel; however, they do share many life history traits common of most freshwater eels, such as catadromy and semelparity. Adult eels will leave freshwater rivers, lakes, and estuaries and enter the WSP or Indian Ocean where they will reproduce. Eggs are assumed to be pelagic, floating in open water until they hatch into leptocephali, larval eels. Leptocephali will feed on marine snow before they metamorphose into glass eels, which migrate back to the freshwater of tropical islands. Once in freshwater they eat small invertebrates and undergo another metamorphosis into elvers. Elvers become yellow eels, before undergoing their final transformation into silver eels before reaching adulthood. Reproductively mature eels then begin their migration back to the ocean where they will begin spawning.

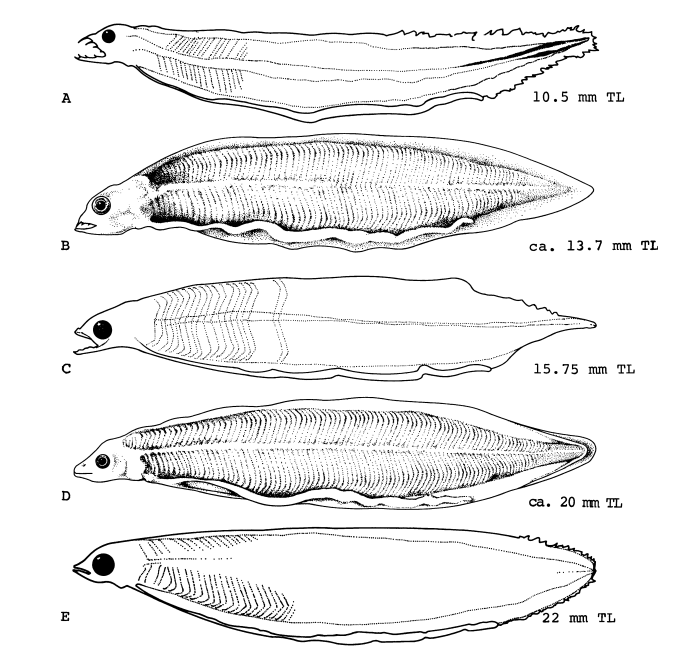
Early life stages of the American eel

Unlike other freshwater eels which are panmictic, meaning they have a randomized breeding structure where any mature individual will mate with any other mature individual, there is evidence to suggest that Polynesian long-finned eels have a population structure. A population structure for breeding indicates non-random mating, implying that A. megastoma undergoes mate selection, although this has yet to be confirmed.

A 2015 study captured A. megastoma leptocephali at an intersection between the South Equatorial Counter Current and the western South Equatorial Current, suggesting that larval eels use the temperature and salinity fronts as landmarks for migration. The potential cues for such migrations include age and body size, endocrinological condition, and behavior drive. Additionally, all species of Anguillidae have been observed to make a diel vertical migration from the epipelagic zone at night into the mesopelagic zone during sunrise. The reason for this migration is still unknown, but it is hypothesized that they travel deep either to avoid predators or to slow gonadal development till they reach warmer waters.

Like similar freshwater eel species, the Polynesian long-finned eel is capable of respiration by gulping water to manually push over their gills in addition to cutaneous respiration. Cutaneous respiration is a process of gas exchange through the skin. Overall, cutaneous respiration makes up a much smaller percentage of respiration than through the gills.

Aging of this species can be achieved through two recorded methods. Rough estimations can be taken by measuring the myomeres of glass eels while more exact measurements can be taken by looking at the otolith.

== Conservation Status ==
As of 2020, the Polynesian long-finned eel is considered Data Deficient (DD) by the International Union for Conservation of Nature Red List, as there is currently not enough information known about them to determine their total population and its status. The Polynesian long-finned eel has been considered Data Deficient since 2014, when the species first appeared on the Red List. They were reevaluated again in 2019, but remained Data Deficient. There have been very few studies specifically pertaining A. megastoma, as they are often studied alongside similar species to learn more about phylogeny of freshwater eels as a whole. Furthermore there have been no studies conducted for the purpose of their conservation. This could be a result of difficulties with sampling or locating their populations given that they are a migratory species that travel through multiple bodies of water. Since the Polynesian long-finned eel goes through a leptocephali stage, these small transparent larvae could also be confused with order eels and fish from their superorder. There is an absence of knowledge regarding the spawning area and larval range which could help determine the status of the species.

Many freshwater eel species are threatened by dams which impede the obligatory migration of their life cycle, which could be true for A. megastoma as there are dams present on the islands whose freshwater they inhabit. Recruitment could also be damaged by climate change modifying landmarks used for migration, making survival for young eels more difficult and decreasing the likelihood they will reach reproductive age.

The Polynesian long-finned eel is not the target of commercial fisheries looking to sell adult eels, however glass eels are often taken for use in aquaculture, potentially making them a target of fisheries.
