= Highlands long-finned eel =

Conservation status
- Data Deficient (IUCN 3.1)

Scientific classification
- Kingdom: Animalia
- Phylum: Chordata
- Class: Actinopterygii
- Order: Anguilliformes
- Family: Anguillidae
- Genus: Anguilla
- Species: A. interioris

Binomial name
- Anguilla interioris Whitley, 1938

Species of fish

The Highlands long-finned eel (Anguilla interioris, also known as the New Guinea eel) is an eel in the family Anguillidae. It was described by Gilbert Percy Whitley in 1938. It is a tropical eel known from freshwaters in eastern New Guinea. The eels spend most of their lives in freshwater but migrate to the ocean to breed. Males can reach a maximum total length of 80 centimetres.

Anguilla interioris is considered most similar morphologically to Anguilla celebensis and Anguilla megastoma.
