= Pacific shortfinned eel =

Conservation status
- Data Deficient (IUCN 3.1)

Scientific classification
- Kingdom: Animalia
- Phylum: Chordata
- Class: Actinopterygii
- Order: Anguilliformes
- Family: Anguillidae
- Genus: Anguilla
- Species: A. obscura

Binomial name
- Anguilla obscura Günther, 1871

Species of fish

The Pacific shortfinned eel (Anguilla obscura), also known as the Pacific shortfinned freshwater eel, the short-finned eel, and the South Pacific eel, is an eel in the family Anguillidae. It was described by Albert Günther in 1871. It is a tropical, freshwater eel which is known from western New Guinea, Queensland, Australia, the Society Islands, and possibly South Africa. The eels spend most of their lives in freshwater, but migrate to the Pacific Ocean to breed. Males can reach a maximum total length of 110 centimetres, but more commonly reach a TL of around 60 cm. The Pacific shortfinned eel is most similar to Anguilla australis (more commonly known as the Short-finned eel), and Anguilla bicolor (the Indonesian shortfin eel), but can be distinguished by the number of vertebrae.

The Pacific shortfinned eel feeds primarily off of bony fish (including the genus Oreochromis), crustaceans and mollusks. It is a commercial eel in subsistence fisheries.
