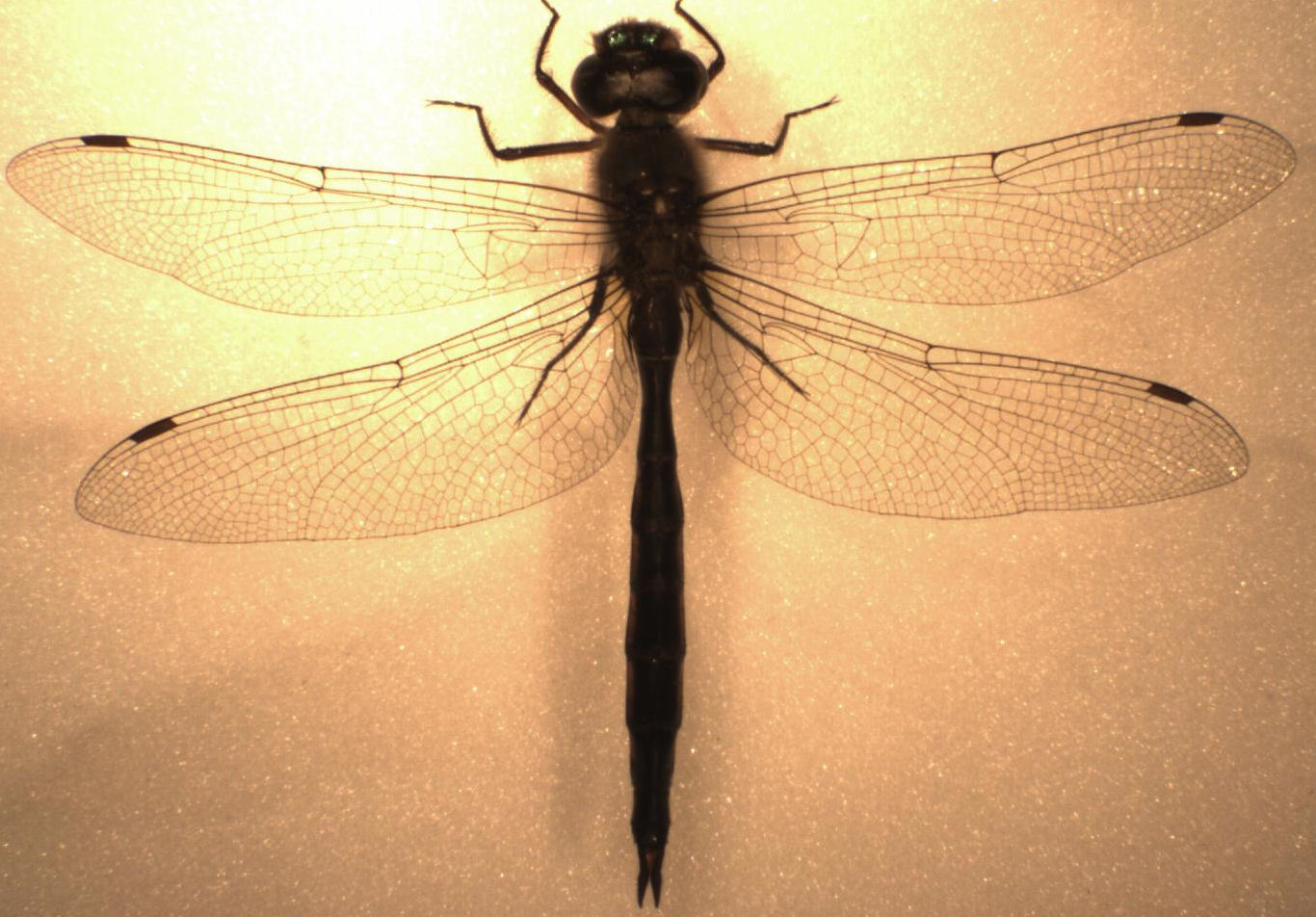
- Procordulia smithii

Scientific classification
- Kingdom: Animalia
- Phylum: Arthropoda
- Clade: Pancrustacea
- Class: Insecta
- Order: Odonata
- Infraorder: Anisoptera
- Family: Corduliidae
- Subfamily: Corduliinae
- Genus: Procordulia; Martin, 1907

= Procordulia =

Genus of dragonflies

Following recent research, species of the genus Procordulia have now been moved into Hemicordulia.

Until recently, Procordulia was a genus of dragonfly in the family Corduliidae. Procordulia was found in Southeast Asia, New Guinea, Australia, New Zealand and parts of the Pacific region.

== Species ==
The genus Procordulia included the following species:

- Procordulia affinis (Selys, 1871)
- Procordulia artemis Lieftinck, 1930
- Procordulia asahinai Karube, 1997
- Procordulia astridae Lieftinck, 1935
- Procordulia fusiformis Lieftinck, 1977
- Procordulia grayi (Selys, 1871)
- Procordulia irregularis Martin, 1907
- Procordulia jacksoniensis (Rambur, 1842)
- Procordulia karnyi Fraser, 1926
- Procordulia leopoldi Fraser, 1932
- Procordulia lompobatang van Tol, 1997
- Procordulia moroensis Lieftinck, 1977
- Procordulia papandayanensis van Tol, 1997
- Procordulia rantemario van Tol, 1997
- Procordulia sambawana (Förster, 1899)
- Procordulia smithii (White, 1846)
- Procordulia sylvia Lieftinck, 1935
- Procordulia valevahalo Marinov, 2016
