= Anguilla borneensis =

Borneo eel

Conservation status
- Vulnerable (IUCN 3.1)

Scientific classification
- Kingdom: Animalia
- Phylum: Chordata
- Class: Actinopterygii
- Division: Teleostei
- Order: Anguilliformes
- Family: Anguillidae
- Genus: Anguilla
- Species: A. borneensis

Binomial name
- Anguilla borneensis Popta, 1924

Species of fish

Anguilla borneensis, also known as the Borneo eel, is a species of the genus Anguilla found in Borneo.
