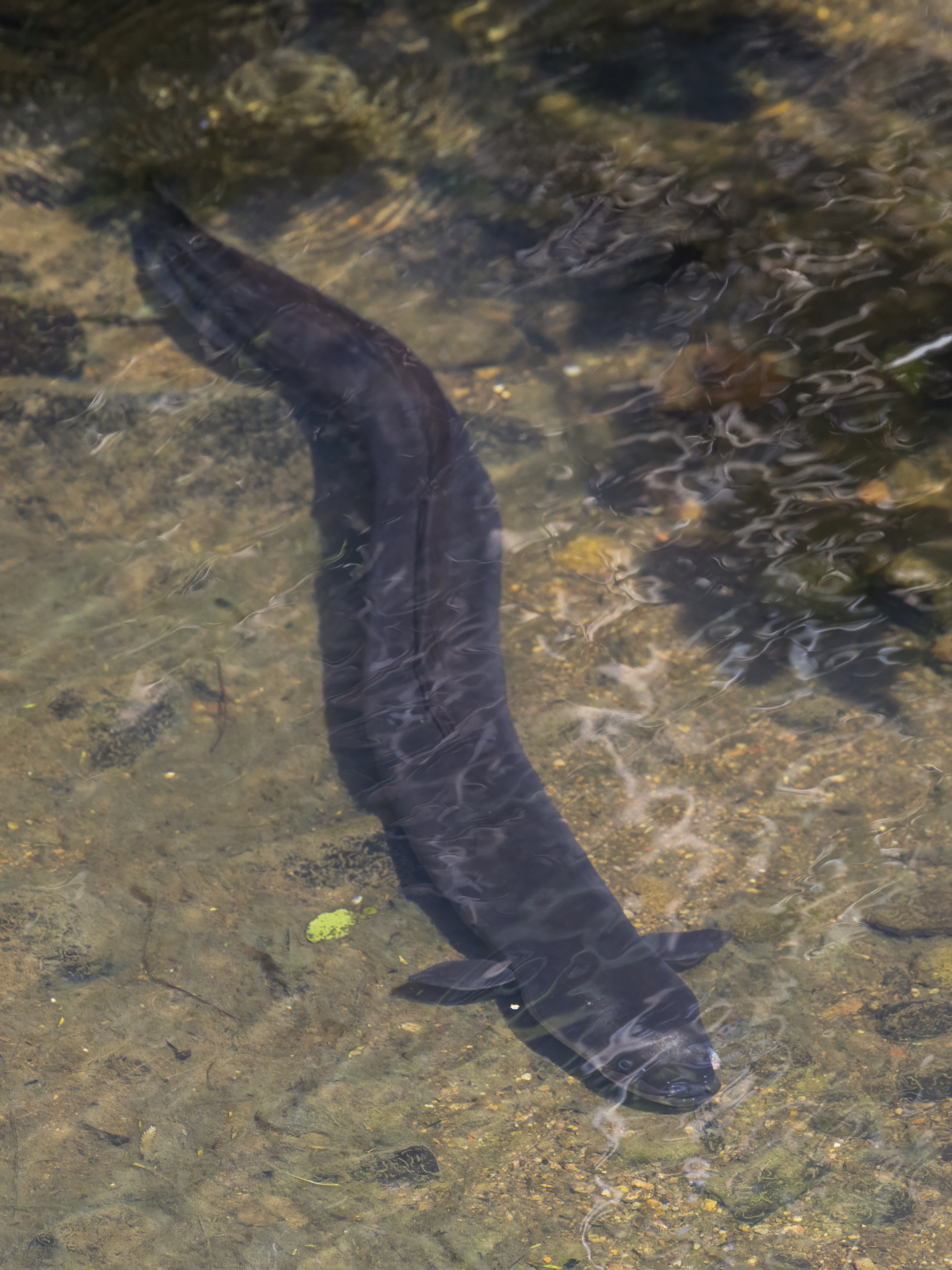
- New Zealand longfin eel (Anguilla dieffenbachii)

Scientific classification
- Kingdom: Animalia
- Phylum: Chordata
- Class: Actinopterygii
- Division: Teleostei
- Order: Anguilliformes
- Suborder: Anguilloidei
- Family: Anguillidae; Rafinesque, 1810
- Genus: Anguilla; Garsault, 1764

Type species
- Anguilla anguilla Linnaeus, 1758

Species
- See text

= Anguillidae =

Anguillidae Temporal range: Danian–0 Early Paleocene (Danian) to Present

Family of fishes

The Anguillidae are a family of ray-finned fish that contains the freshwater eels. All the extant species and six subspecies in this family are in the genus Anguilla, and are elongated fish of snake-like bodies, with long dorsal, caudal and anal fins forming a continuous fringe. They are catadromous, spending their adult lives in freshwater, but migrating to the ocean to spawn.

Eels are an important food fish and some species are now farm-raised, but not bred in captivity. Many populations in the wild are now threatened, and Seafood Watch recommends consumers avoid eating anguillid eels.

== Description ==
Adult freshwater eels are elongated with tubelike, snake-shaped bodies. They have large, pointed heads and their dorsal fins are usually continuous with their caudal and anal fins, to form a fringe lining the posterior end of their bodies. They have relatively well developed eyes and pectoral fins compared to saltwater eels that they use to navigate and maneuver through river bottoms and shallow water. Unlike most eels, freshwater eels have not lost their scales, and instead have soft, thin, scales that are embedded in the epidermis. Additionally, freshwater eels possess small, granular teeth arranged in bands on the jaws and vomer. Anguillidae do exhibit size-dependent sexual dimorphism. Male anguillids invest more energy in mating with as many females as possible than in growth. Therefore, female anguillids are usually larger, ranging from 1.5–3 feet (0.46–0.91 m), while male anguillids rarely get larger than 1.5 feet (0.46 m) long. Adult Anguillidae can vary in color, but normally are brown, olive or olive-yellow, and can be mottled. Coloration matches the floor of rivers and lakes which prevents the eels from being seen by predators while in clear or shallow water. Freshwater eels go through physical changes in their bodies when going to and from the ocean for different stages of life.

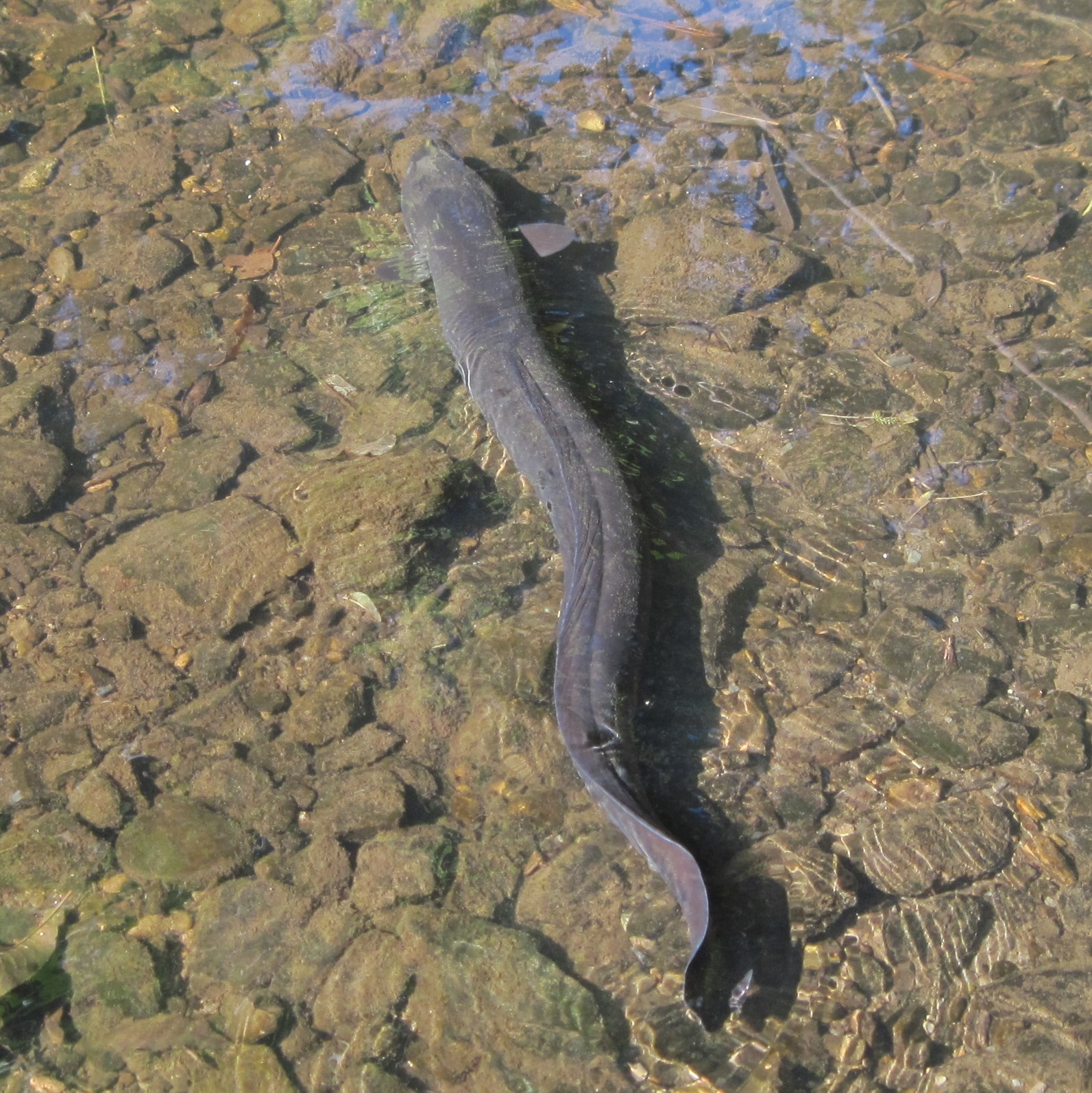
New Zealand longfin eel (Anguilla dieffenbachii)

Aside from their reduced pectoral fins, eels lack paired appendages. They use axial-based lateral undulation as means of locomotion, similar to snakes. High maneuverability of the trunk is an adaptation for hunting in structurally-complex habitats such as reefs. Some species are known to burrow into the sea bed/sediment, including species that utilize head-first or tail-first burrowing techniques. This is related to both foraging and anti-predatory behavior.

=== Sensory ===
Anguillidae, unlike their other relatives, have a fully developed lateral line along their trunk. The lateral line provides the ability for Anguillidae to sense their surrounding environment through water displacement, which aids in predation and hunting, especially because they are predominantly nocturnal generalists.

Olfactory senses in this family are heightened for various reasons. Within the nasal sac are olfactory cells which have the capability of detecting extremely diluted chemicals as low as three to four molecules. This is extremely helpful in their nocturnal endeavors as well as for migratory purposes. They use terrestrial odors as cues in migration as well as low salinity and colder temperatures to direct themselves.

Geomagnetic sensing has been identified as one of the most important specialized senses in this family. Unlike the other relatives, the Anguillidae are catadromous, meaning they must migrate for an extended period and, depending on what life stage they are in, they may be in the open ocean. The Anguillidae were placed in a "magnetic displacement" experiment where the geomagnetic north could be altered, and their actions could be monitored. The results showed that at different stages of life, the Anguillidae, are capable of responding to the geomagnetic field and will alter their direction of interest accordingly. They depend on the intensity and inclination of the magnetic field to migrate. Within this experiment researchers also looked at how the glass eel may rely on the circatidal rhythm in the ocean to work its way back to the coast and into the freshwater systems, but this problem is not yet fully understood.

=== Physiology ===
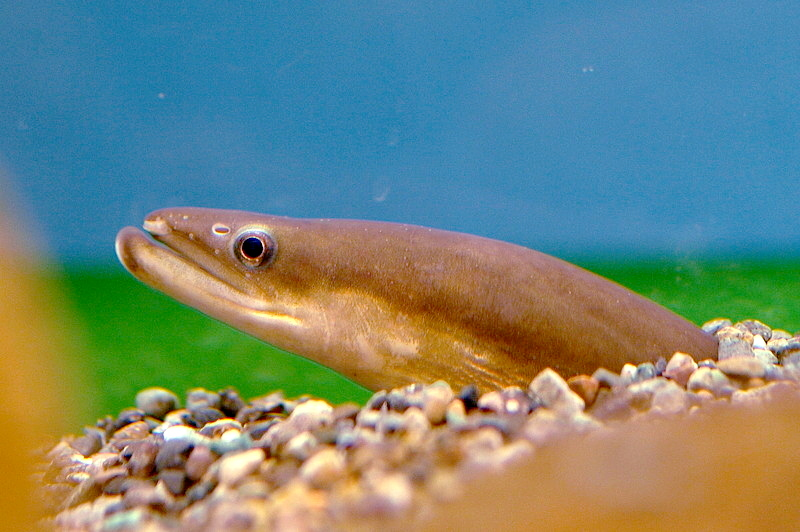
Japanese eel (Anguilla japonica)

Paired frontal bones of skull make for a stronger cranium which aids in their variable burrowing tendencies with mud as well as maneuvering through terrestrial obstacles when hiding under rocks and logs that they encounter at the water's bottom where they spend most of their time during the day.

Ventral lateral gill slits make up eighty-five percent of gas exchange and are highly efficient in converting between salt and freshwater. This feature separates the Anguillidae, freshwater eels, from other eels that have an internal gill chamber.

Many species have variegated skin, which means they will vary in color depending on their environment. This adaptation helps them camouflage, which they utilize for ambushing prey and hiding from predators.

The dorsal, anal and caudal fins are fused and pelvic fins are lacking. Dorsal fin begins at the mid body, creating a long continuous fin, where in other species it begins more posterior and is not as prominent in length. Their body movement depends highly on undulation originating near the anterior axial end. Due to the fins being fused we see a highly skilled swimmer amongst the Anguillidae which aids in migration and hunting/predation.

It was mistakenly reported that Anguillidae lack a scapular bone but after further research and more advanced staining techniques they have a scapula and coracoid which make up their pectoral girdle. The presence of a scapula is important in muscle attachment and allows for the upper head to move in various directions as well as increase strength of body undulation, thus increasing swimming capabilities. The presence of a scapula allows for stronger movements of pectoral fins which aid in movement across terrestrial obstacles.

=== Other features ===
Cutaneous respiration accounts for approximately fifteen percent of their oxygen intake but when they are out of water, they are capable of receiving approximately fifty percent of their oxygen through gas exchange via the outer integument. This is an important feature since Anguillidae at many times need to move between bodies of water to maintain an aquatic environment. It is also known that they will burrow down into mud so having the capability to exchange gas outside of water is highly beneficial to this family.

It is known that when bodies of water start to dry up the Anguillidae burrow down into the mud and wait for rain while undergoing torpor. Since rain is not predictable, torpor allows for the organism to lower its metabolic rate as well as its body temperature increasing its survivability.

Anguillidae are great swimmers due to their axial muscle attachment and W-shaped myomeres giving them the capability of swimming backwards just as well as they can swim forward. Not many other fish can do so. Since their mouths are not very large, they use their swimming capabilities to aid in feeding where they will bite onto their food and twist/spin rapidly tearing off a piece perfectly sized for them.

Population density sex determination is a feature where the Anguillidae regulate their population's gender depending on the abundance of eggs present. High egg concentrations will result in more male than female ratios as well as vice versa. It does not mean that the eggs will all become one sex but rather have a higher ratio in one of the two sexes present.

Mucous cells within the epidermis are found in both the non-sexually mature and sexually mature adult stages. The mucous cells are made of glycoproteins which are found in higher concentrations on the dorsal and ventral sides of the body. It is believed that the family Anguillidae has higher concentrations of slime than other families. This aids in predation as well as helping keep themselves moist outside of water, increasing the efficiency of cutaneous respiration.

Metamorphosis is a big part in the lives of Anguillidae and many changes happen in preparation for migration amongst the adults going from the yellow eel stage to the silver eel stage. The gas bladder adapts for higher pressures which it will be exposed to in the ocean where it will dive much deeper in search of food and avoiding strong currents. Fat reserves increase in preparation for less abundant food sources in the ocean. Females will experience a higher increase than males for the reason of egg production. The eyes also change increasing in size by two times and retinal pigments which are sensitive to red light in shallow waters change to pigments that are sensitive to blue light which is better adapted for the deep ocean that the silver eel will be experiencing.

One experiment talked about the driving force that is seen in Anguillidae. When held in captivity it was reported that they would hit their heads against the glass or make fast for an escape route most likely looking for the fresh or saltwater they seek. This was a key indicator that they are constantly migrating.

== Distribution and conservation ==
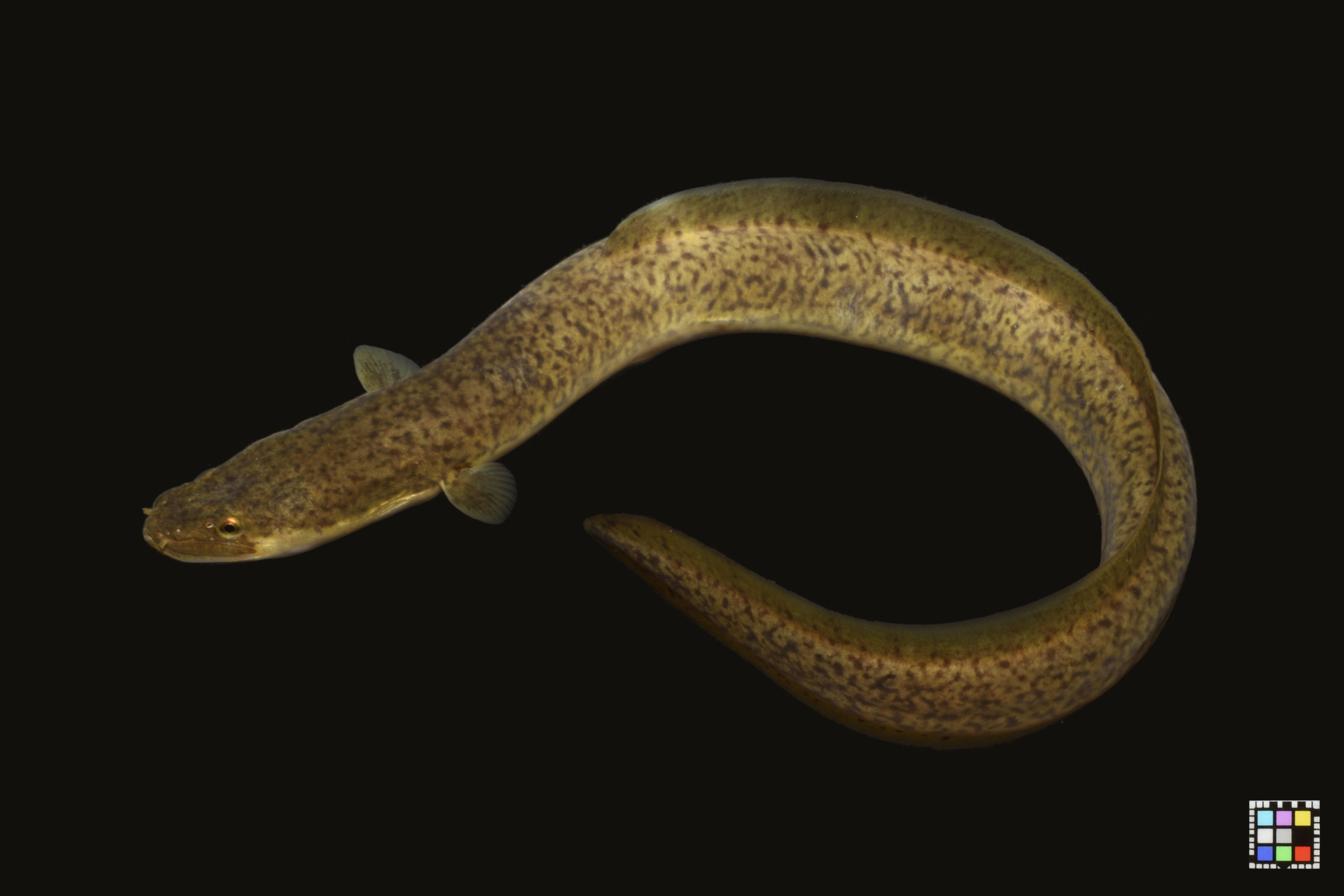
Anguillid eel

Anguillid eels have a global distribution, and inhabit the waters of more than 150 countries. They are mainly found in tropical and temperate waters, except in the Eastern Pacific and South Atlantic. Conservation is difficult for this taxon because not much is known about their life history and behaviors. However, many Anguillid eels are of conservation concern, including the European eel (A. anguilla), the American eel (A. rostrata), the Japanese eel (A. japonica), the New Zealand longfin eel (A. dieffenbachii), and the Indonesian longfinned eel (A. borneensis). Threats to these species include: habitat loss/modification, migration barriers, pollution, parasitism, exploitation, and consumption, as eels are a popular food source especially in Asia and Europe. Fluctuating oceanic conditions associated with climate change also make these species vulnerable, with reduced water quality leading to biodiversity loss among the largest threats. In the Northern hemisphere, anguillid eels have had large declines in populations due to a number of reasons including overexploitation and migration inhibition via migration barriers. According to the IUCN Anguillid Eel Specialist Group, or the AESG, the need for conservation of this family is clear given recent declines. However, conservation efforts are being inhibited by a lack of knowledge of the biology of these species, especially in their social and spawning behavior, as well as a lack of long-term data sets.

== Biology ==
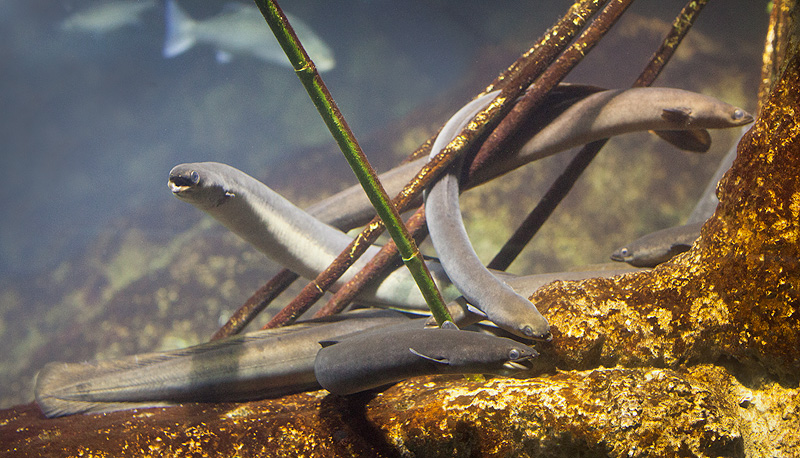
European eel (Anguilla anguilla)

Freshwater eels are aquatic and live in various habitats, including freshwater, estuaries, and saltwater/marine habitats. They occupy the roles of both predator and prey, and evidence has been found of nematode parasitism in some species.

Eels in the family Anguillidae are known to be primarily solitary in nature; they are not known to communicate socially or actively school, however large masses of elvers can be found as a result of synchronicity in response to environmental conditions. These eels are known as generalists and opportunistic feeders; most will consume whatever acceptable prey they happen upon, including things like crustaceans, fishes, and other aquatic fauna. Some eel species have been observed consuming the eggs of predatory fish such as trout, aiding in population control in these systems.

Juvenile eels occupy small spaces in between rocks, in crevices or mud. Freshwater eels are widespread and are catadromous, meaning they spend most of their life in freshwater (rivers mainly) and migrate to the ocean to breed. Leptocephali (larval) migration can range from months to up to almost a year. Temperate eels migrate on average for approximately 6–10 months, while tropical eels undergo shorter migrations between approximately 3–5 months on average. The European eel (A. anguilla) has one of the longest migrations of all freshwater eels, migrating up to 6000 km (over 3700 miles) in a single migration loop. Migration loops may be flexible in some species, and this variability is still being investigated. However, some eels in this family have altered their migration loop to become completely marine, not returning to fresh waters to develop. Ocean-resident eels are the exception of this family, and this behavior may be more common in areas in which the freshwater habitat is of lower quality or productivity.

=== Reproduction and life cycle ===
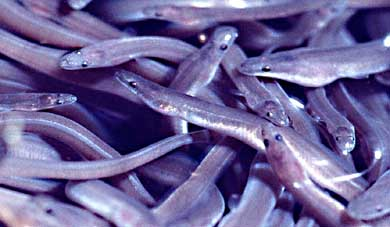
Juvenile American eels (Anguilla rostrata)

Anguillid eels are semelparous, meaning they only live to reproduce once, as they die after reproduction. The European eel can spawn starting at 7 years old, and the oldest of this species that has been found in the wild was 85 years of age. These conditions may include fat content, water quality or temperature, prey availability, river height and water flow rate, etc. This variability allows some eels to live even 50–70 years, however the lifespan of freshwater eels is not well documented. Very little is known about the mechanics of fertilization and spawning, and the time it takes these eels to hatch from their eggs is variable. Tsukamoto and associates found evidence of Japanese eels (A. japonica) may synchronize their breeding cycles during the spawning season with the new moon.

Members of this family spend their lives in freshwater rivers, lakes, or estuaries, and return to the ocean to spawn. All eels pass through several stages of development through their life cycle. Anguillid eels undergo morphological changes during these developmental stages that are associated with environmental conditions and aid in preparing them for further growth and finally reproduction. Anguillid eels begin their life as an egg in the ocean, and once hatched, enter a larval stage called leptocephali. The young eel larvae live only in the ocean and consume small particles called marine snow. Anguillid eels lay adhesive demersal eggs (eggs that are free-floating or attached to substrate), and most species have no parental care. Japanese eels (A. japonica) can lay between 2 million and 10 million eggs. These planktonic (free floating) eggs and translucent, leaf-like larvae are dispersed via ocean currents and migrate sometimes thousands of miles. They grow larger in size, and in their next growth stage, they are called glass eels. At this stage, they enter estuaries-upon returning to freshwater growing habitat, the eels become pigmented and develop through the elver and yellow eel stages. The yellow and silver eel stages are named aptly for the coloration of the underbelly of the eel during these developmental stages. Elvers travel upstream in freshwater rivers, where they grow to adulthood. Finally, anguillids transition through the silver eel stage into adulthood and migrate to the oceanic breeding grounds to reproduce and begin the cycle anew. The discovery of the spawning area of the American and European eels in the Sargasso Sea is one of the more famous anecdotes in the history of ichthyology. The spawning areas of some other anguillid eels, such as the Japanese eel, and the giant mottled eel, were also discovered recently in the western North Pacific Ocean.

== Commercial importance ==
Anguillid eels are important food fish. Eel aquaculture is a fast-growing industry. Important food eel species include longfin eel, Australian long-finned eel, short-finned eel, and Japanese eel. Most eel production historically has been in Japan, Korea, and Taiwan, but in recent years, the greatest production has been in China.

Seafood Watch, one of the better-known sustainable seafood advisory lists, recommends consumers avoid eating anguillid eels due to significant pressures on worldwide populations. Several species used as unagi have seen their population sizes greatly reduced in the past half century. Catches of the European eel, for example, have declined about 80% since the 1960s. Although about 90% of freshwater eels consumed in the US are farm-raised, they are not bred in captivity. Instead, young eels are collected from the wild and then raised in various enclosures. In addition to wild eel populations being reduced by this process, eels are often farmed in open-net pens, which allow parasites, waste products, and diseases to flow directly back into wild eel habitat, further threatening wild populations. Freshwater eels are carnivores so are fed other wild-caught fish, adding another element of unsustainability to current eel-farming practices.

== Systematics ==
The exact placement of freshwater eels is still being debated, but there is a general consensus that Anguillidae are firmly nested within Anguilliformes. Traditionally, molecular studies have placed Anguillidae in the subclass "Anguilloidei" with two other families: Nemichthyidae (snipe eels) and Serrivomeridae (sawtooth eels). Until 2013, this subclass had been lumped together into a cohesive clade. However, recent molecular studies have suggested that Anguillidae are actually more closely related to the Saccopharyngiforms (Gulpers and relatives) than they are to the other Anguilloid families. This leads to two possibilities: Either Anguilloidei is a paraphyletic group, or it was originally delineated inaccurately, and Anguillidae should not be included in this subclass. However, more studies need to be conducted to confirm the placement of freshwater eels within Anguilliformes, and determine the composition of the Anguilloidei subclass.

Based on genetic analysis, it is estimated that Anguillidae diverged from other eels about 52 million years ago, and extant Anguilla species began speciating about 20 million years ago.

=== Species ===
Phylogeny of the Anguillidae by Inoue et al. 2010

- Anguilla
  - - A. mossambica
    - - A. borneensis
      - - - A. anguilla
          - A. rostrata
        - - A. australis
          - A. dieffenbachii
  - - A. reinhardtii
    - - A. japonica
      - - - A. celebesensis
          - A. megastoma
        - - A. marmorata
          - - A. bengalensis
            - - A. interioris
              - - A. obscura
                - A. bicolor

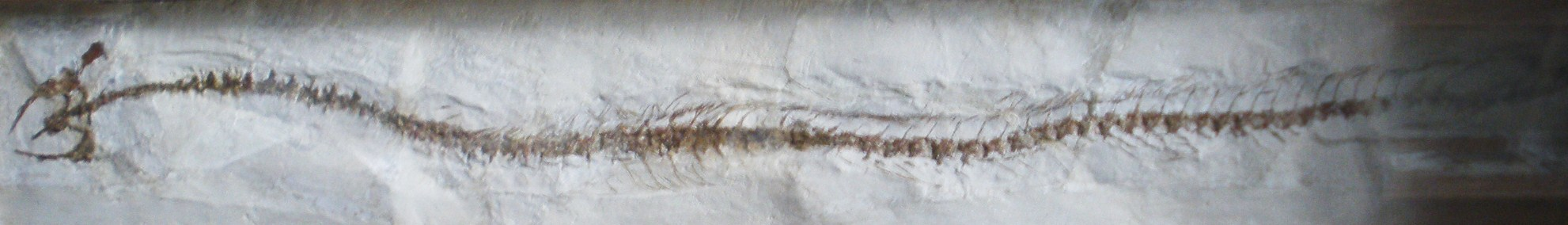
Fossil specimen of Anguilla pachyura from the Middle Miocene of Germany

- †Anguillidarum Schwarzhans 2003
  - †Anguillidarum semisphaeroides Schwarzhans 2003
- Anguilla Garsault 1764
  - Anguilla anguilla (Linnaeus, 1758) (European eel)
  - †Anguilla annosa Stinton 1975
  - Anguilla australis J. Richardson, 1841
    - Anguilla australis australis J. Richardson, 1841 (short-finned eel)
    - Anguilla australis schmidti Phillipps, 1925
  - Anguilla bengalensis (J. E. Gray, 1831) (mottled eel)
    - Anguilla bengalensis bengalensis (J. E. Gray, 1831) (Indian mottled eel)
    - Anguilla bengalensis labiata (W. K. H. Peters, 1852) (African mottled eel)
  - Anguilla bicolor McClelland, 1844
    - Anguilla bicolor bicolor McClelland, 1844 (Indonesian shortfin eel)
    - Anguilla bicolor pacifica E. J. Schmidt, 1928 (Indian shortfin eel)
  - Anguilla borneensis Popta, 1924 (Borneo eel)
  - Anguilla breviceps Y. T. Chu & Y. T. Jin, 1984
  - †Anguilla brevicula Agassiz 1833–1845
  - Anguilla celebesensis Kaup, 1856 (Celebes longfin eel)
  - Anguilla dieffenbachii J. E. Gray, 1842 (New Zealand longfin eel)
  - †Anguilla ignota Micklich, 1985
  - Anguilla interioris Whitley, 1938 (Highlands longfin eel)
  - Anguilla japonica Temminck & Schlegel, 1847 (Japanese eel)
  - Anguilla luzonensis S. Watanabe, Aoyama & Tsukamoto, 2009 (Philippine mottled eel)
  - Anguilla marmorata Quoy & Gaimard, 1824 (giant mottled eel)
  - Anguilla megastoma Kaup, 1856 (Polynesian longfin eel)
  - Anguilla mossambica (W. K. H. Peters, 1852) (African longfin eel)
  - †Anguilla multiradiata Agassiz 1833–1845
  - Anguilla obscura Günther, 1872 (Pacific shortfinned eel)
  - †Anguilla pachyura Agassiz 1833–1845
  - †Anguilla pfeili Schwarzhans 2012
  - †Anguilla rectangularis Stinton & Nolf 1970
  - Anguilla reinhardtii Steindachner, 1867 (speckled longfin eel)
  - Anguilla rostrata (Lesueur, 1817) (American eel)
  - †Anguilla rouxi Nolf 1974
- †Eoanguilla Blot, 1978
  - †Eoanguilla leptoptera (Agassiz, 1835)

An undescribed well-preserved fossil Anguilla is also known from the Foulden Maar lagerstatte of New Zealand.

=== Paleontology ===
Although Anguilla is the only modern representative of the family Anguillidae, a second marine genus, Eoanguilla, is known from the Early Eocene of Monte Bolca in Italy, and appears to be the oldest known representative of Anguillidae known from full body fossils (slightly younger than Anguilla ignota).

There are two important fossils used to date the origin of freshwater eels. The first is the fossil Nardoechelys robinsi which represents the ancestor to all extant eels, and marks the lower-boundary of the age of Anguillidae. The second is Anguilla ignota, which is the fossil that represents the ancestor to all extant freshwater eels and marks the upper boundary of the age of Anguillidae. Using these two fossil calibration points, freshwater eels are said to originate between 83 million years ago and 43.8 million years ago.

N. robinsi was found by Italian scientists in 2002 in the Santonian-Campanian Calcari di Melissano, which is a fossil bed located near the town of Nardò. Strontium-isotope stratigraphy concluded the age of N. robinsi to be 83 million years old. The fossil was discovered incomplete and lacked the skull and part of the anterior skeleton. Despite the morphological uncertainty, cranial and branchial features confirmed it was an eel. At first, it was classified the earliest member of the eel family, Ophichthidae (snake eels). However, upon further inspection, the fossil only displayed one synapomorphy of snake eels, and possessed morphological features more congruent with an ancestral anguilliform. Therefore, many phylogenetic studies use this fossil as a calibration point to date crown anguilliforms. Therefore, if the oldest eel is 83 million years old, it can be concluded that Anguillidae could not have originated any earlier than that.

The earliest known, unequivocal fossil of an anguillid eel is Anguilla ignota and was found in Messel, Germany. The Messel fossil deposit is dated to be 43.8 million years old during the mid-Eocene epoch. During this time period, Messel was undergoing intense volcanic activity which resulted in the formation of freshwater maar lakes. A. ignota was found in the geological remains of one of these lakes, which makes it the oldest eel to inhabit a freshwater environment. Arguably, the most defining feature of Anguillidae is the fact that they inhabit freshwater, being the only family of eels to do so. Therefore, the hypothesis stating that A. ignota is the ancestor to all freshwater eels is strongly supported. This fossil is commonly used as a calibration fossil to pinpoint the lower boundary of the age of freshwater eels.
