= Philippine mottled eel =

Conservation status
- Vulnerable (IUCN 3.1)

Scientific classification
- Kingdom: Animalia
- Phylum: Chordata
- Class: Actinopterygii
- Order: Anguilliformes
- Family: Anguillidae
- Genus: Anguilla
- Species: A. luzonensis

Binomial name
- Anguilla luzonensis Watanabe, Aoyama & Tsukamoto, 2009

Synonyms
- Anguilla huangi Teng, Lin & Tzeng, 2009

Species of fish

The Philippine mottled eel (Anguilla luzonensis) is an eel in the family Anguillidae. It was described by Shun Watanabe, Jun Aoyama, and Katsumi Tsukamoto in 2009. It is a tropical eel known from the Pinacanauan River system on Luzon Island (from which the species epithet is derived), in the Philippines. The eels spend most of their lives in freshwater but migrate to the ocean to breed.
