= Eoanguilla =

Eoanguilla Temporal range: Early Eocene

Scientific classification
- Kingdom: Animalia
- Phylum: Chordata
- Class: Actinopterygii
- Order: Anguilliformes
- Family: Anguillidae
- Genus: †Eoanguilla; Blot, 1978
- Species: †E. leptoptera

Binomial name
- †Eoanguilla leptoptera (Agassiz, 1835)

Synonyms
- †Anguilla leptoptera Agassiz, 1835

Extinct genus of prehistoric bony fish

Eoanguilla ("dawn Anguilla") is an extinct genus of prehistoric marine eel that lived during the early Eocene. It contains a single species, E. leptoptera from the Ypresian-aged Monte Bolca site of Italy. It is thought to have been an early marine relative of the modern freshwater eels (genus Anguilla).

It was first described in error as a fossil specimen of the European conger (then treated as Muraena conger) by Volta in 1796. It was later reclassified into Anguilla by Agassiz as its relationship to that genus was determined, and reclassified into its own genus over a century later.

== See also ==
- Prehistoric fish
- List of prehistoric bony fish
