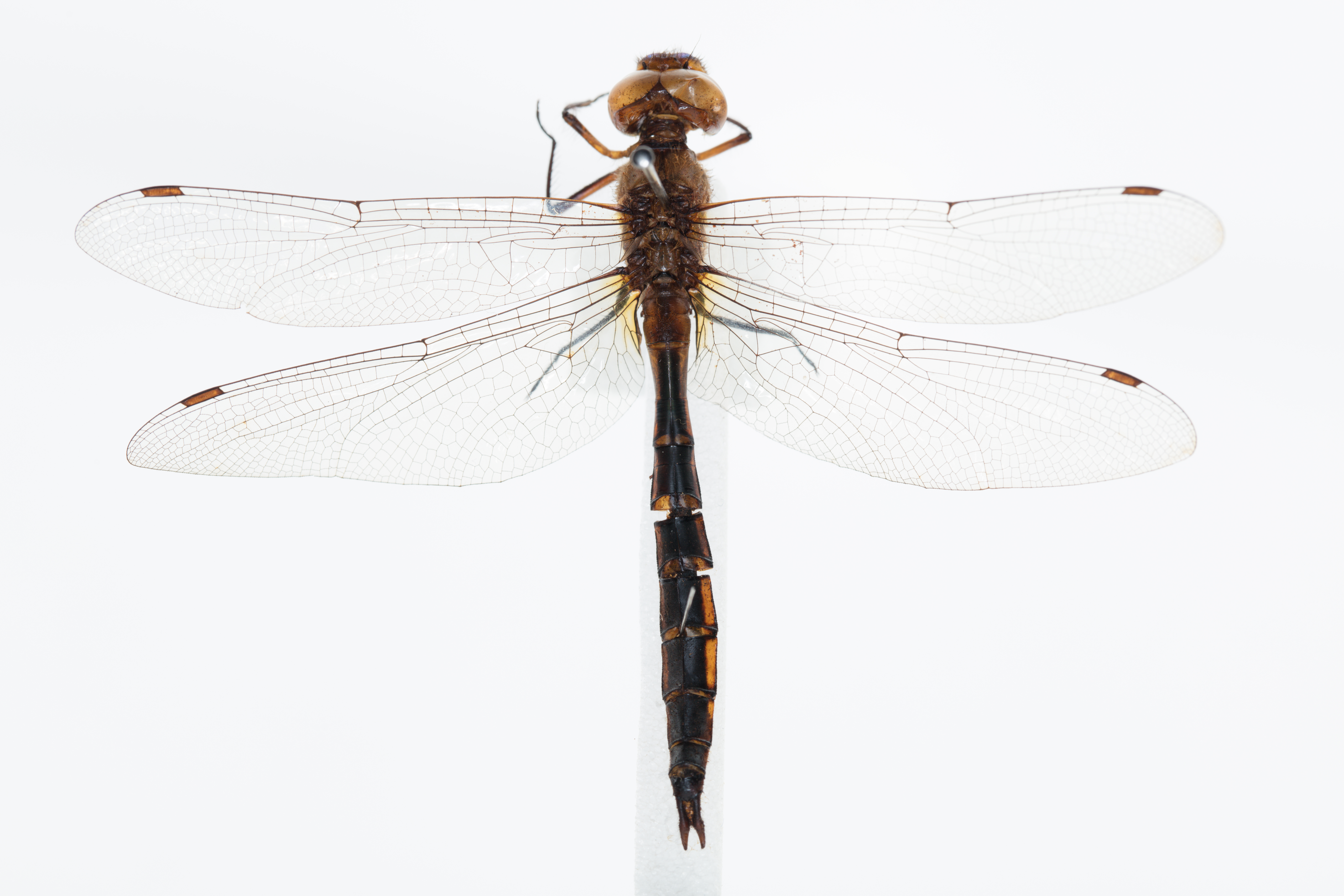
- Preserved specimen from the Auckland Museum

Conservation status
- Least Concern (IUCN 3.1)

Scientific classification
- Kingdom: Animalia
- Phylum: Arthropoda
- Clade: Pancrustacea
- Class: Insecta
- Order: Odonata
- Infraorder: Anisoptera
- Superfamily: Libelluloidea
- Family: Corduliidae
- Genus: Hemicordulia
- Species: H. smithii

Binomial name
- Hemicordulia smithii (White, 1846)

Synonyms
- Cordulia smithii White, 1846; Cordulia novae-zeelandiae Brauer, 1865

= Hemicordulia smithii =

Species of dragonfly

Hemicordulia smithii, commonly known as Smith's dragonfly or the ranger dragonfly, is a species of dragonfly endemic to New Zealand. It is similar in appearance to its close relative Hemicordulia grayi.

The species was formerly classified as Procordulia smithii, but is now placed in Hemicordulia following current taxonomic treatments including the World Odonata List.

Interest in New Zealand dragonflies dates back to Cook's voyages, but the first collection containing dragonflies was not established until 1842. George Hudson made significant contributions to the study of New Zealand Odonata, although he had difficulty distinguishing Hemicordulia smithii from Hemicordulia grayi due to their close resemblance.

The order Odonata has one of the stronger fossil records among insects, yet comparatively few studies have examined the biogeographical patterns of its taxa. Distribution trends appear to correlate with climatic zones. Hemicordulia smithii is widespread in the South Island and lower North Island, suggesting the species is well adapted to cooler environments. Rowe (1987) supported this view, noting that eggs of Procordulia smithii—the genus then in use—were able to withstand freezing temperatures during glacial advances.

== Description ==
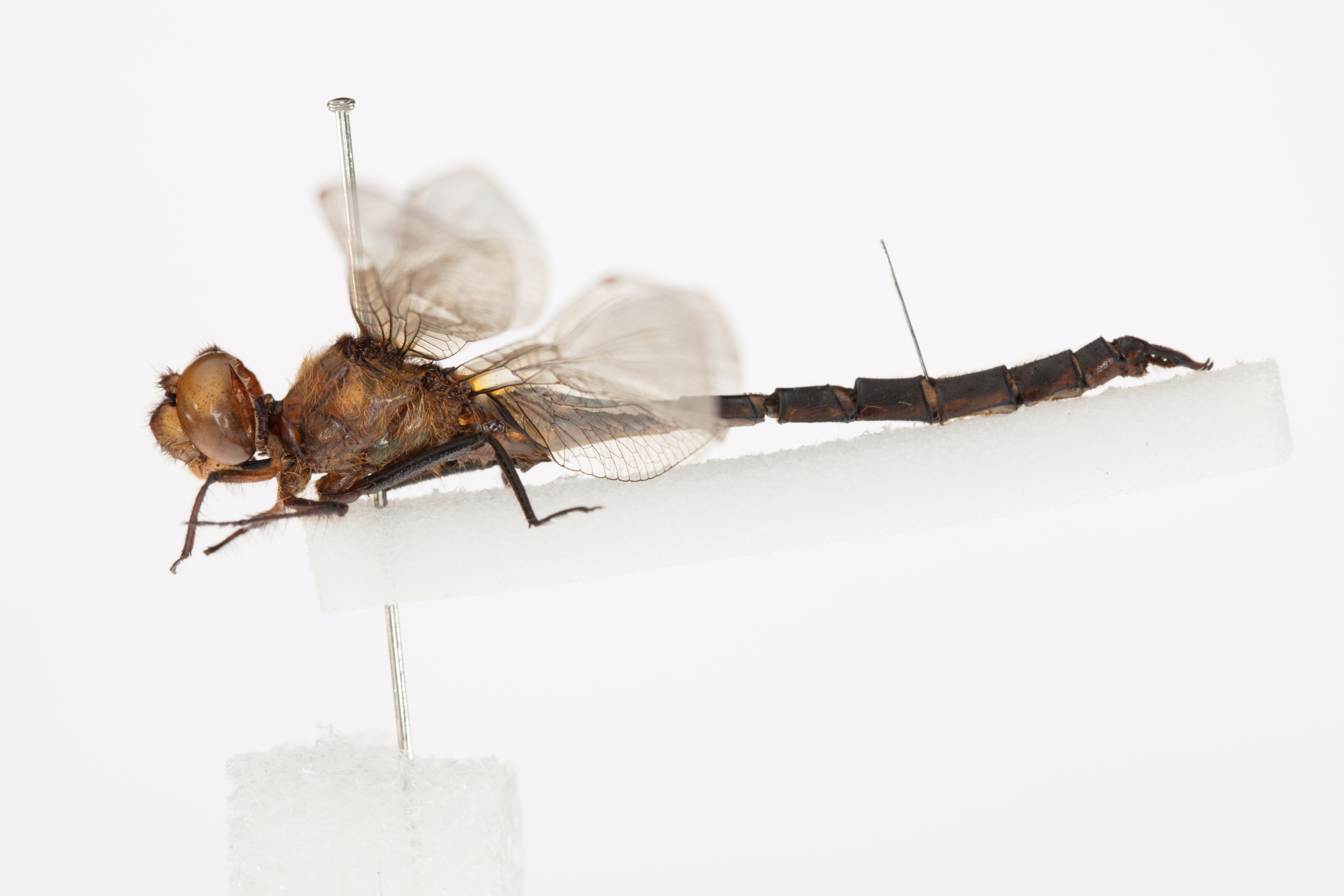
Lateral view of a preserved specimen at the Auckland Museum

Hemicordulia smithii has large, globe-like compound eyes that meet at the top of the head. In males the eyes are green with a slight iridescence, while in females they are brown and lack iridescence. The species’ eyes are highly sensitive to movement and changes in light, giving it rapid, radar-like visual responses.

The abdomen is long, tubular, and slightly flattened, usually black or dark brown in colour. Rowe (1987) noted that the intersegmental membranes “often appear bright pale-yellow, producing the appearance of narrow, illuminated, widely separated transverse stripes down the abdomen when the species is in flight.”

The legs are thin and spiny, adapted for seizing prey and carrying it while in flight. Norberg (1972) described the wings as having considerable flexibility due to the presence of the nodus, a structural bend located roughly halfway along the wing, which allows the wing to flex during flight. The pterostigma assists in stabilising the wing. Hemicordulia smithii typically measures 46–50 mm in length. Rowe (1987) recorded that legs closer to the body tend to be brown, whereas those further out are black. Specimens from the Chatham Islands have been reported to show colour variations compared with mainland individuals.

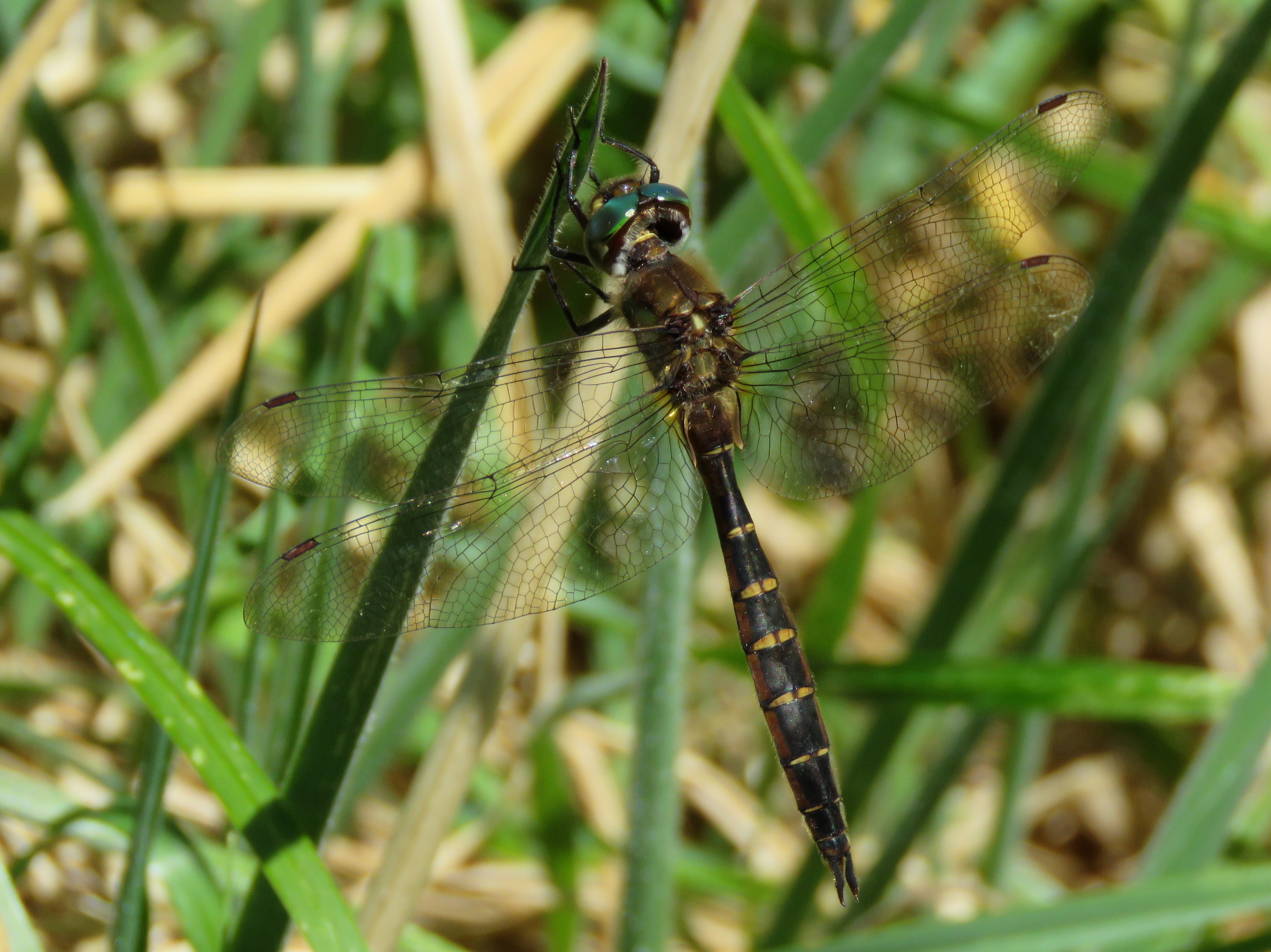
Smith's dragonfly (Hemicordulia smithii) male resting on a grass blade at Okuru in South Westland

== Distribution ==
Although Hemicordulia smithii is now considered endemic to New Zealand, it shows strong affinities with Australian and Pacific species. Rowe (1987) noted that Procordulia smithii, as it was then classified, shares features with the broader Hemicordulia–Procordulia group found throughout Australia and the Pacific, and suggested that the species may have colonised New Zealand during an interglacial period.

Hemicordulia smithii occurs only in New Zealand. It has been recorded on coastal islands, including Little Barrier Island and the Chatham Islands. It is particularly abundant in the Canterbury region of the South Island.

Rowe (1987) reported the species as widespread across New Zealand and especially common in the South Island and southern parts of the North Island. However, he also noted an apparent absence from the northern North Island and suggested that this required further investigation. Rowe further commented that the abundance of Procordulia smithii populations had fluctuated since the 1950s.

Hemicordulia smithii inhabits a wide range of freshwater environments, including inland wetlands, streams, creeks, swamps, peatlands, marshes, bogs, waterfalls, and fens. Larvae are less frequently found in flowing waters and occur more often in bulrush beds, small bog ponds adjacent to streams, and backwaters or flood ponds. Adults are typically associated with stream habitats, and exuviae are commonly found near ponded or slow-flowing areas. Marinov (2015) also reported that adults may occur in grasslands up to five kilometres away from the nearest water source.

== Life cycle/phenology ==
Like other dragonflies, Hemicordulia smithii does not have a pupal stage; the life cycle proceeds directly from larva to adult. Deacon (1979) estimated that the full life cycle of Procordulia smithii, as then classified, takes approximately four years to complete. Rowe (1987) reported that females lay their eggs in shallow, still water, but also noted that limited research has led to a poor understanding of maturation periods in New Zealand dragonflies. He suggested that mark-and-recapture studies would help clarify adult longevity and behaviour.

Larvae of Hemicordulia smithii inhabit freshwater and brackish environments. They remain aquatic until developing wing sheaths roughly halfway through their growth, after which they begin leaving the water. Ware and Herrera (2012) described the species’ distinctive mating behaviour: pairs form a tandem position leading into a copulatory wheel, a heart-shaped posture characteristic of dragonflies. Copulation involves indirect fertilisation via secondary genitalia located at the base of the abdomen in both sexes.

Rowe (1987) noted two periods of peak adult abundance: late December to early January, and again in late February.

== Diet and foraging ==
Wolfe (1949) reported that male Hemicordulia smithii at Cass, Canterbury, made daily foraging movements of about 0.7 km, travelling to nearby river flats to feed before returning to their territories the following morning.

Like other odonates, Hemicordulia smithii preys on small flying insects and is considered an agile and highly capable hunter in both its larval and adult stages. Dragonflies and damselflies are often among the top predators in freshwater ecosystems, and their hunting success rates are exceptionally high. While a lion captures its prey roughly 25% of the time, some dragonfly species are estimated to succeed in about 95% of attempts.

== Predators, parasites and diseases ==
Hemicordulia smithii is not regarded as threatened and is currently listed as a species of Least Concern. Like many odonates, however, it may be vulnerable to the effects of climate change. Populations in high-elevation habitats could be at risk if suitable environments contract, while species living in warmer or tropical regions may be affected by deforestation and rising temperatures, potentially leading to local declines or extinctions.

Adult dragonflies are preyed upon by trout and various spider species, and mites are also known to parasitise odonates. Little specific information exists regarding parasites or diseases affecting Hemicordulia smithii, and further research is needed to better understand these aspects of its biology, as well as its sensitivity to climate-related environmental changes.
