= Anguilla breviceps =

Scientific classification
- Kingdom: Animalia
- Phylum: Chordata
- Class: Actinopterygii
- Division: Teleostei
- Order: Anguilliformes
- Family: Anguillidae
- Genus: Anguilla
- Species: A. breviceps

Binomial name
- Anguilla breviceps Chu & Jin, 1984

Species of fish

Anguilla breviceps is a species of eels in the family Anguillidae. It was described by Y.T. Chu and Jin in 1984. It is a subtropical eel found in freshwater bodies in China.
