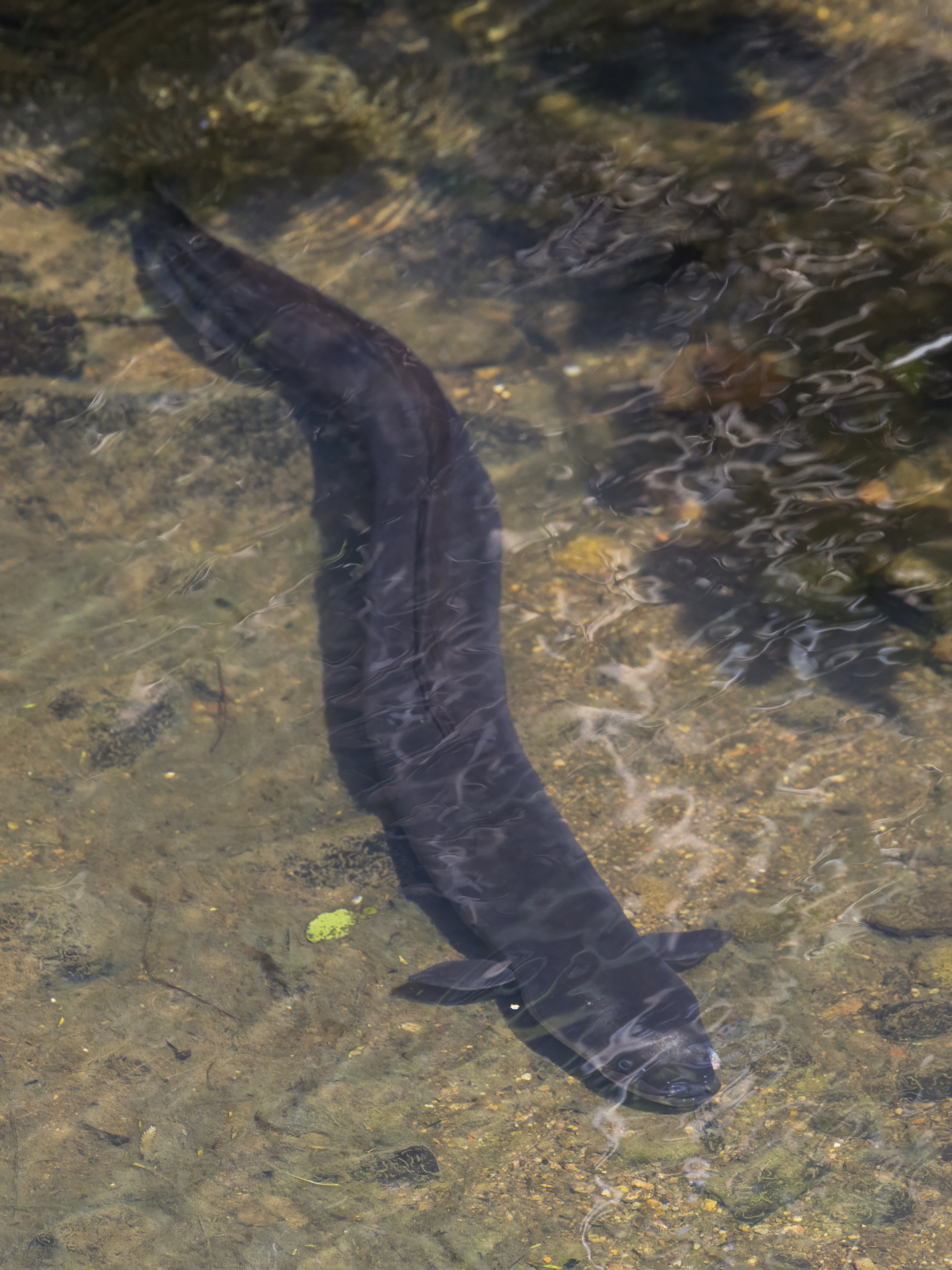

Conservation status
- Endangered (IUCN 3.1)

- Gradual Decline (NZ TCS)

Scientific classification
- Kingdom: Animalia
- Phylum: Chordata
- Class: Actinopterygii
- Division: Teleostei
- Order: Anguilliformes
- Family: Anguillidae
- Genus: Anguilla
- Species: A. dieffenbachii

Binomial name
- Anguilla dieffenbachii J. E. Gray, 1842
- Approximate known distribution (in orange) of the New Zealand longfin eel on a map of New Zealand

= New Zealand longfin eel =

Species of fish

The New Zealand longfin eel (Anguilla dieffenbachii) is a species of freshwater eel that is endemic to New Zealand. It is the largest freshwater eel in New Zealand and the only endemic species – the other eels found in New Zealand are the native shortfin eel (Anguilla australis), also found in Australia, and the naturally introduced Australian longfin eel (Anguilla reinhardtii). Longfin eels are long-lived, migrating to an unknown site in the tropical Pacific Ocean to breed at the end of their lives. They are good climbers as juveniles and so are found in streams and lakes a long way inland. An important traditional food source for Māori (who name them ōrea), longfin eel numbers are declining and they are classified as endangered, but over one hundred tonnes are still commercially fished each year.

== Description ==
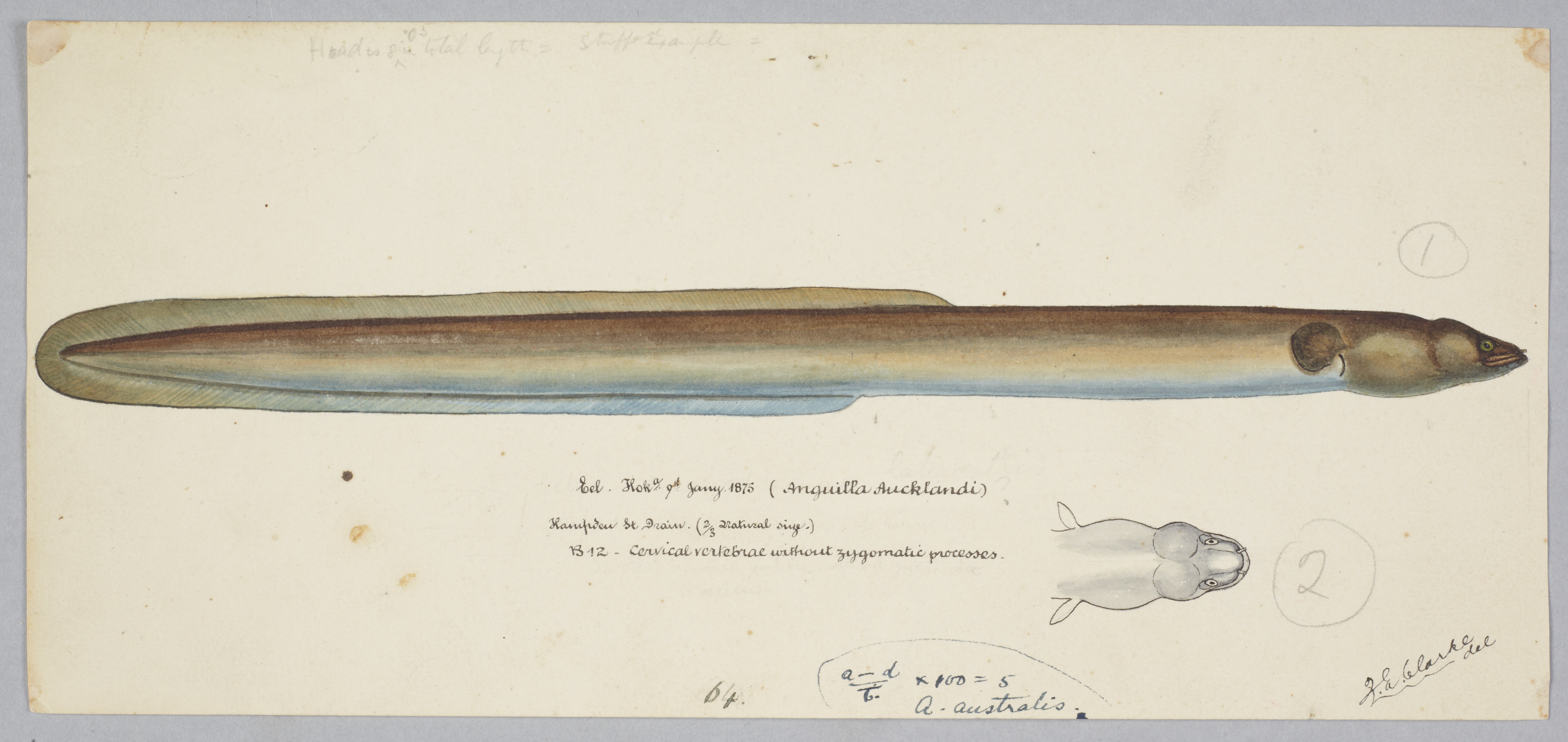
Illustration by Frank Edward Clarke

The easiest way to identify the longfin eel is by the length of its fins: the dorsal (top) fin is about two-thirds the length of the body and starts significantly further towards the head than the anal (bottom) fin. In the shortfin eel the fins are of similar length. When a longfin eel bends its loose skin wrinkles distinctively inside each bend, where a shortfin eel's skin is smooth. A longfin's mouth extends past its eyes, further than a shortfin's.

Female longfin eels are larger and longer-lived than males. Males average 66.6 cm but reach up to 73.5 cm in length, with an average age of 23 years (12–35 years). Females are considerably larger, ranging from 73 to 156 cm with an average length of 115 cm. Females attain an age of 20 to 60 years before migrating to sea to breed. Longfin eels in the North Island migrate at a younger age and thus have faster generation times.

Determining longfin sex is difficult as their sexual organs are not determined until they are over 45 cm in length. The only method to determine longfin eels sex is through internal examination and it only becomes easy to distinguish when the eels mature and migrate.

== Life cycle ==
Like other members of the Anguillidae, longfin eels have a rather unusual life cycle: they grow and mature into fertile adults in fresh water, then migrate to the sea to breed. This catadromous breeding system also ensures randomised mating, creating a panmictic population.

The New Zealand longfin eel is a very long-lived fish, with records of females reaching 106 years old and weighing up to 24 kg. They have the slowest growth rate of any eel species studied, just 1–2 centimetres a year.

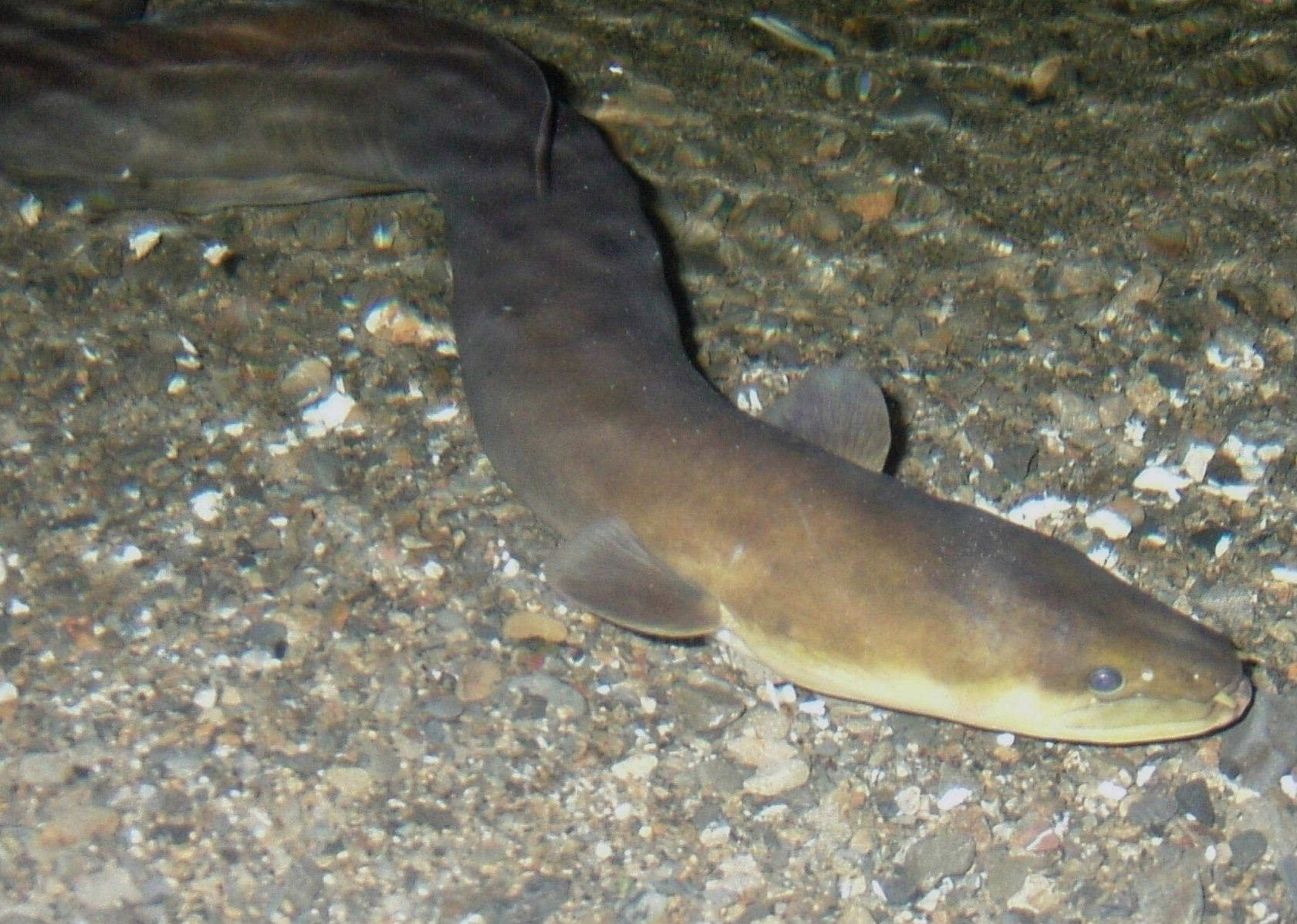
Longfin eel seen in a river at night in the Tararua Ranges

Longfin eels life cycle like other species of Anguillidae eels is rather complex consisting of four distinct life stages which remained a mystery for many decades and still is not fully understood.

New Zealand longfins breed only once at the end of their lives, making a journey of thousands of kilometres from New Zealand to their spawning grounds in the western South Pacific, possibly in the South Fiji basin. Although the spawning location of this species has often been stated as "near Tonga" or "east of Tonga", this was based on an analogy with the latitude of Atlantic eel spawning; no larval A. dieffenbachii have ever been observed, so the spawning location remains unknown. Their eggs (of which each female eel produces between 1 and 20 million) are fertilised in deep tropical water. The mature eels then die, their eggs floating to the surface to hatch into very flat leaf-like larvae (called leptocephalus) that then drift along large oceanic currents back to New Zealand. This drifting is thought to take up to 15 months. There have been no recorded captures of either the eggs or leptocephali of longfin eels. Upon arriving in New Zealand, the larvae undergo a transformation (metamorphosis) into glass eels, like small transparent adult eels. These occupy estuaries for their first year, during which they develop colouration and become elvers, which resemble small adult longfin eels. The elvers migrate upstream, where they develop into adults.

The recruitment of glass eels into New Zealand's freshwater river networks is a very variable process, thought to be affected by the El Niño and La Niña Southern Oscillations. This is a major reason for the failure of longfin eel aquaculture in the 1970s.

== Diet ==
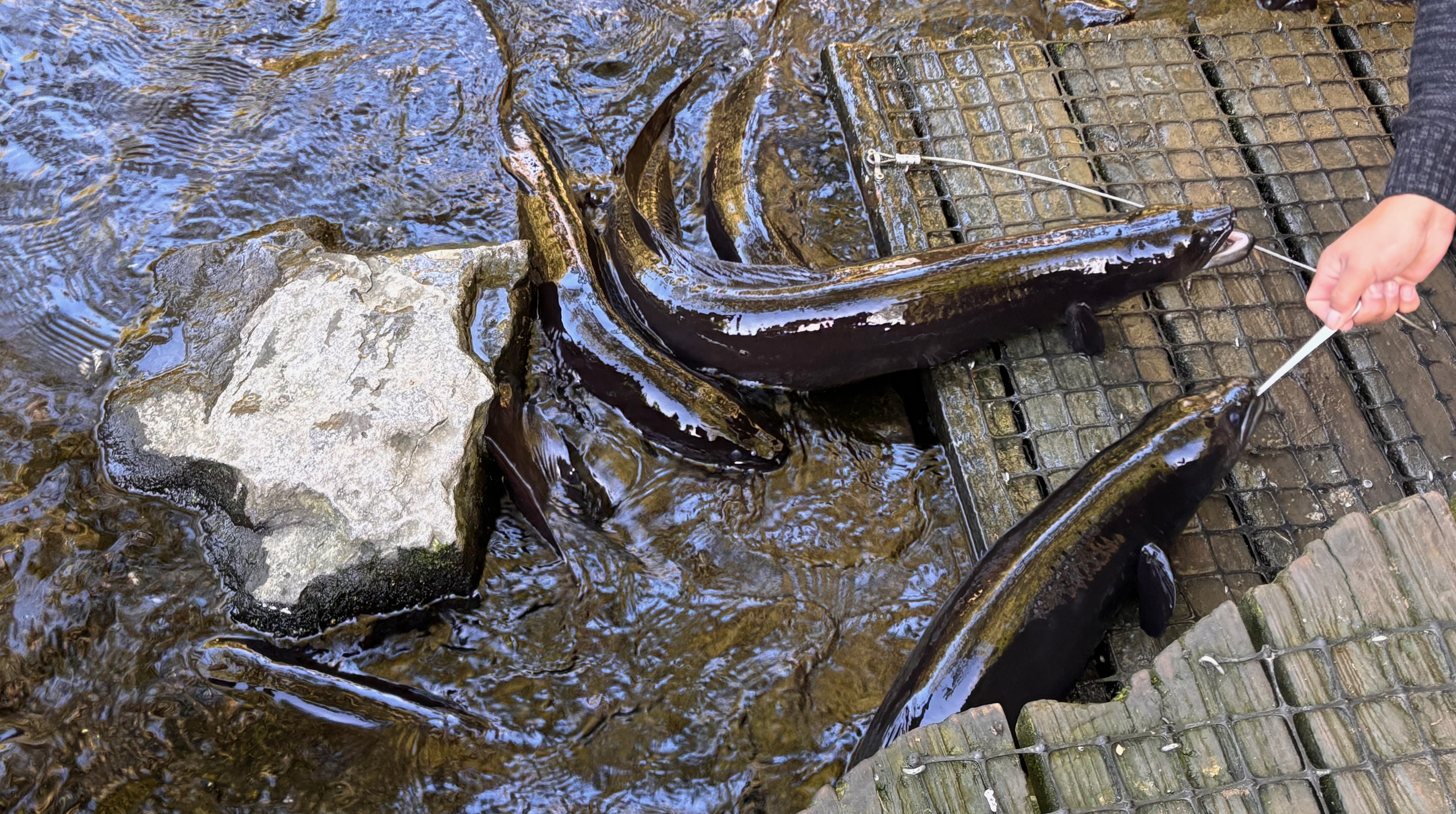
New Zealand longfin eels feeding at Willowbank Wildlife Reserve.

Longfin eels have an omnivorous diet and are opportunistic feeders. Their diet as small eels largely consists of insect larvae, such as dragonfly nymphs (Procordulia grayi). As the eels grow, they also feed heavily on Lymnaea snails and fish, including galaxiids, the upland bully, and yearling trout which are taken by larger eels. There are reports of these eels eating small waterfowl, such as ducklings.

== Habitat and distribution ==
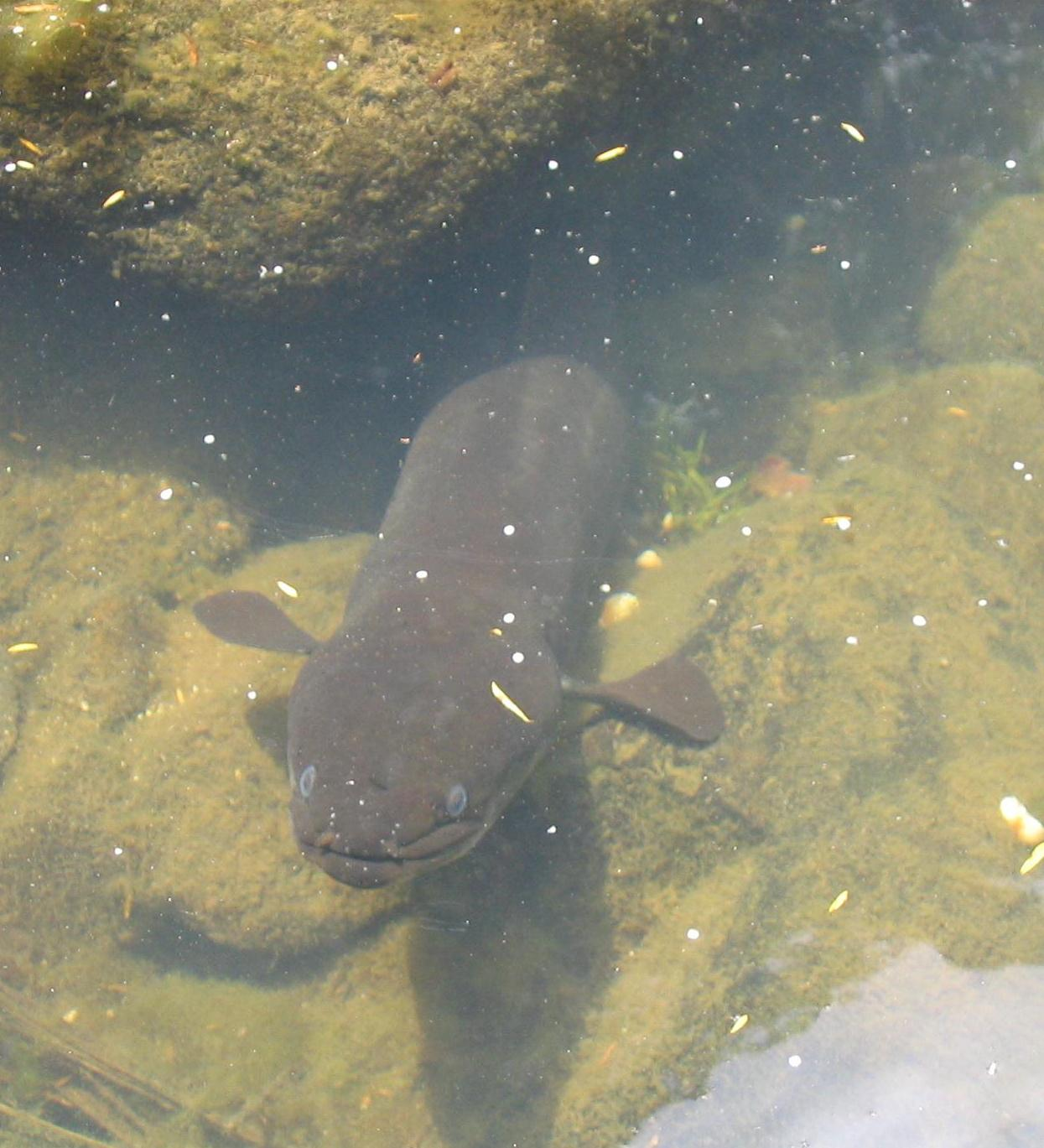
New Zealand longfin eel at the base of a waterfall near Piha beach, Waitākere Ranges, Auckland.

Anguilla dieffenbachii is endemic species to New Zealand, widely distributed through the country's lakes and rivers, including the Chatham Islands.

Longfin eels are often found great distances inland (up to 361 km) along fresh waterways and in high country lakes which are connected to the sea. Aiding in their inland distribution is their climbing ability in elver (juvenile) stage, under 12 cm in length. These migration events frequently coincide with increased temperate, water flow and low light conditions. At this size the elvers can travel up to 130 km inland over a summer, and have been observed climbing near-vertical surfaces up to 43 m tall. This feat is accomplished through a combination of surface tension (with the water) and friction.

Where in a waterway longfin eels live depends on their life stage. As juveniles, they prefer shallow water (under 0.5 m deep) with coarse substratum and faster than average stream flow (such as that found in riffles). Adult longfin eels tend to be found next to or under large pieces of debris and undercut river banks.

== Significance for Māori ==
Ōrea are an important traditional food source for Māori, who have long had extensive knowledge of the timing of their upstream and downstream migrations.

== Commercial fishing ==
The commercial fishing of longfin eels began to gain momentum in the 1960s, and by the 1970s there was a 2000 tonne yearly catch. The fishery went into decline in the early 1980s, and in the 2000–2001 fishing season only 1079 tonnes were taken. Commercial longfin eel fishing was included in the Quota Management System (QMS) in 2000 for the South Island and 2004 for the North Island. This set limits to the minimum and maximum size (220 grams and 4 kg) and the Total Allowable Catch (TAC). As of 2007, the TAC has not been reached in any fishing season since the implementation of the QMS. In recognition of the traditional significance of longfin eels, Māori have a 20 percent allocation of fishery stocks. The capture and export of glass eels in New Zealand has been prohibited. As of 2022 up to 137 tonnes of eels including longfin eels were still being caught for export – despite the species being officially classified as endangered by the International Union for Conservation of Nature (IUCN) Red List of Threatened Species.

== Aquaculture ==
There have been a number of attempts at aquaculture of longfin eels. The first were in the 1970s, and did not remain operational for long, with the last farm closing in 1982. The most common reasons for these failures were economic (the high cost of production vs low price for the eels), variable recruitment of glass eels, and the high mortality (death) rates in the farms. Since the early 2000s, there has been renewed interest in the aquaculture of longfins due to the increasing knowledge of their biology and the diminishing stocks of European eels (Anguilla anguilla), but no farms have been built.

== Conservation ==
In 2003 biologist Don Jellyman predicted longfin numbers would drop by between 5 and 30% in the following decade. The species was classified in 2014 and again in 2018 by the Department of Conservation as "At Risk: Declining" under criteria "C(2/1) Total area of occupancy > 10 000 ha (100 km^{2}), predicted decline 10–70%". The DOC panel concluded though that the commercial fishery of the species is stable or increasing, and noted "that public discourse on the longfin eel portrays the species as being severely threatened despite data that indicate otherwise." This conclusion has been seriously questioned, repeatedly, both before and since then, throwing its validity into doubt.

In June 2012 it was reported that some pet food companies use the nationally threatened eels in their products, sparking outrage by conservationists. Scientists and conservation groups have growing concern for the survival of the species, as they can be legally killed and have a slow reproduction rate, breeding only once at the end of their lifetime. The 2018 IUCN assessment noted a sharp decline in longfin numbers over the last century, accompanied by significant reduction of habitat.

The IUCN currently classes the species as "Endangered", making the following notes: "Population Severely Fragmented; Continued Reduction in Mature Individuals; Continuing Decline in Area/Extent and/or Quality of Habitat" Despite this, the New Zealand government continues to allow its export and allows legal recreational killing of the fish.

== See also ==
- Eel life history
