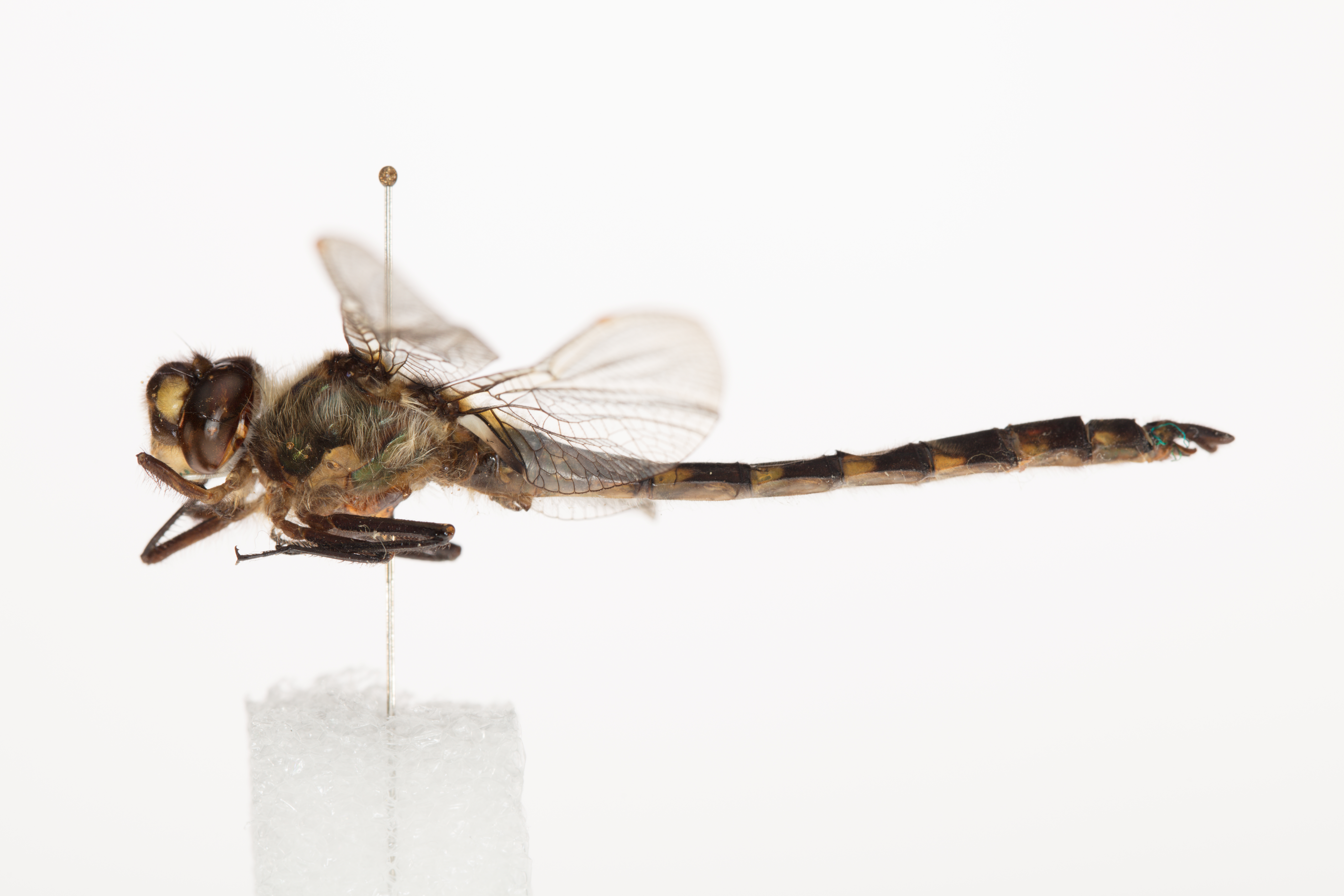

Conservation status
- Least Concern (IUCN 3.1)

Scientific classification
- Kingdom: Animalia
- Phylum: Arthropoda
- Clade: Pancrustacea
- Class: Insecta
- Order: Odonata
- Infraorder: Anisoptera
- Superfamily: Libelluloidea
- Family: Corduliidae
- Genus: Hemicordulia
- Species: H. grayi

Binomial name
- Hemicordulia grayi (Selys, 1871)

Synonyms
- Epitheca grayi Selys, 1871; Procordulia grayi (Selys, 1871)

= Hemicordulia grayi =

Species of dragonfly

Hemicordulia grayi, commonly known as the yellow-spotted dragonfly or Gray's dragonfly, is a species of dragonfly endemic to New Zealand.

The species was formerly classified as Procordulia grayi, but is now placed in Hemicordulia following current taxonomic treatments including the World Odonata List.

== Description ==
Hemicordulia grayi is distinguished by two lines of yellow spots running along each side of the abdomen. Adults measure between 48 and 52 mm (1.9 and 2.0 in) in length. The thorax is dark greenish bronze, while the abdomen is dull brown above and paler below, with a yellow spot at the front of each abdominal segment. The legs may appear blackish or tawny red.

In older descriptions, Procordulia grayi was noted to have a setate posteromesal tubercle on the posterior margin of the eye. The eyes are closely set and green with a faint iridescent sheen.

Larvae have an abdomen that widens posteriorly and ends in stiff, pointed appendages rather than caudal lamellae. The arrangement of palpal setae is also distinctive.

In some early New Zealand literature, Procordulia grayi was occasionally misidentified as a large Uropetala carovei. It can be distinguished by its smaller size and non-burrowing habit.

== Range ==
Hemicordulia grayi is endemic to New Zealand, where it occurs across much of the southern volcanic plateau of the North Island and throughout the South Island. Although recorded in Auckland, it is most commonly found south of the Waikato.

Its elevational range extends from sea level to about 1,000 m. The species shows a strong association with large lakes, and is often linked with substantial areas of standing water. Although sometimes described as subalpine, larvae occur from near sea level up to around 960 m.

== Habitat ==
Hemicordulia grayi occupies a range of freshwater environments, including shrubland wetlands and vegetated lake and pond margins.

Earlier research indicated a preference for standing waters, with larvae common along rocky lakeshores such as Lake Taupō and Lake Rotoiti.

== Ecology ==
=== Life cycle ===
The life cycle begins with the laying of eggs on or near submerged vegetation. Development is strongly temperature-dependent: eggs of Procordulia grayi do not hatch below 9.5 °C, and maturation ceases at around 8.7 °C. Low temperatures are associated with arrested development. Because Hemicordulia grayi emerges early in the season but requires relatively warm conditions for egg maturation, early-season survival can be precarious.

Adults are fully functional on emergence, with hardened cuticle, operational wings, and reproductive organs. They disperse and feed actively around lake and wetland margins. Exuviae are left on partially submerged stones or stems.

=== Phenology ===
Adults may travel up to 5 km between feeding and breeding areas, but movement patterns are limited and the species is considered “not a migrant”.

Emergence peaks from late October to mid-November and finishes by late January. Timing varies with local temperature. Earlier observations of Procordulia grayi reported emergence before sunrise and after twilight, with the latest individual leaving at 10:45 solar time. Most adults were already flying by civil twilight, sometimes at temperatures as low as 10 °C.

=== Diet and foraging ===
With a larval lifespan of two to four years, Hemicordulia grayi is a benthic predator consuming a broad range of invertebrates.

Adults hunt flying insects on the wing, while naiads use underwater ambush tactics.

Larval prey includes chironomids, oligochaetes, other odonates such as Austrolestes colensonis, and crustaceans (Cladocera, Ostracoda). Larger prey may include caddisflies, diving beetles (Dytiscidae), and water bugs (Notonectidae, Corixidae).

=== Predators, parasites, and diseases ===
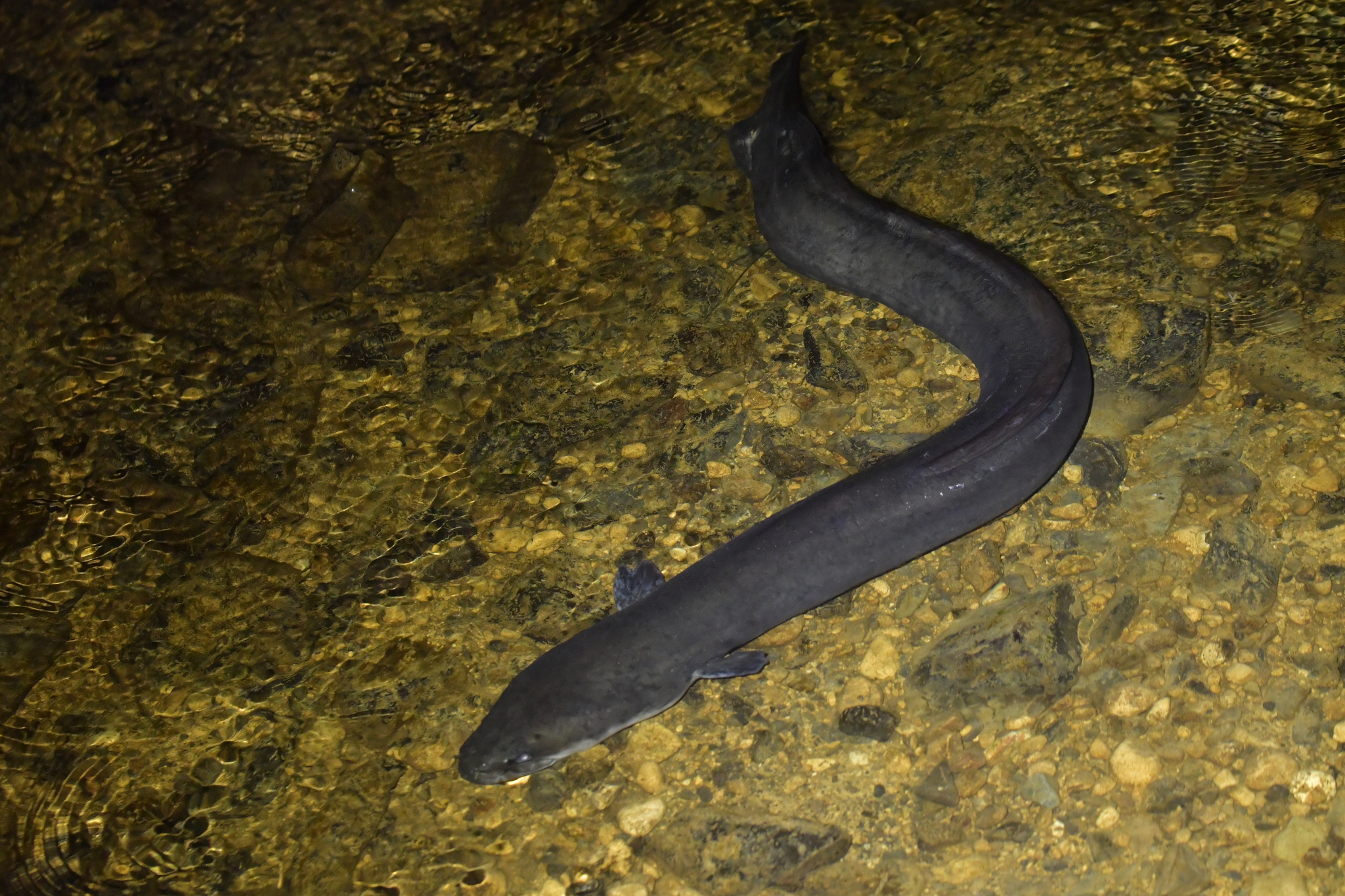
Anguilla dieffenbachii

Larvae are preyed upon by frogs, toads, fish, beetles, aquatic bugs, and other dragonfly larvae. Longfin eels (Anguilla dieffenbachii) feed primarily on snails but also consume Procordulia grayi larvae during coastal migrations.

Information on parasites or diseases specific to Hemicordulia grayi is limited.

=== Population ===
Because Hemicordulia grayi often inhabits remote areas, it was once considered rare. Competition from Hemicordulia australiae has resulted in some displacement of Procordulia grayi in earlier records. Despite this, the species remains relatively stable and is assessed as Least Concern.
