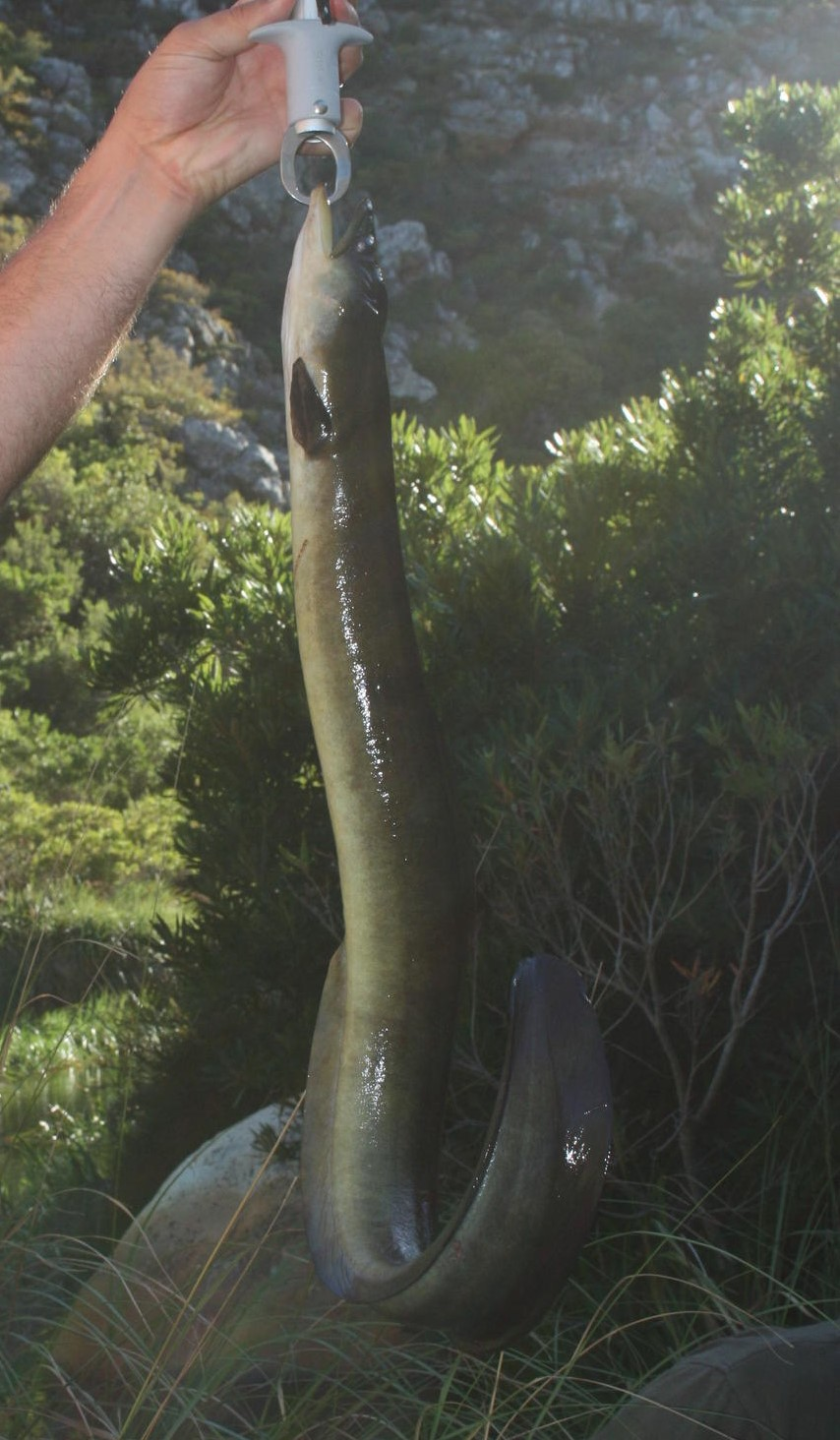
- Near Cape Town, South Africa

Conservation status
- Near Threatened (IUCN 3.1)

Scientific classification
- Kingdom: Animalia
- Phylum: Chordata
- Class: Actinopterygii
- Division: Teleostei
- Order: Anguilliformes
- Family: Anguillidae
- Genus: Anguilla
- Species: A. mossambica

Binomial name
- Anguilla mossambica (Peters, 1852)

Synonyms
- Anguilla capensis Castelnau, 1861; Anguilla capensis Kaup, 1860; Anguilla delalandi Kaup, 1856; Anguilla delalandii Kaup, 1856; Muraena mossambica Peters, 1852; Tribranchus anguillaris Peters, 1846

= African longfin eel =

Species of fish

The African longfin eel (Anguilla mossambica), also known simply as the longfin eel, is an eel in the family Anguillidae. It was described by Wilhelm Peters in 1852, originally under the genus Muraena. It is a tropical eel known from freshwaters in southern Kenya, Cape Agulhas, Madagascar, and New Caledonia. The eels spend most of their lives in freshwaters far inland, but migrate to the Western Indian Ocean to breed. Males can reach a maximum total length of 150 centimetres; females can reach a maximum standard length of 120 centimetres and a maximum weight of 5,000 grams. The eels can live for about 20 years. Juveniles and adults are known to feed off of carcasses, crabs, and bony fish.

== As food ==
The African longfin eel is raised in commercial fisheries as well as aquafarms, and is also considered a game fish. It has fatty flesh which is prized in a smoked or jellied dish.

== See also ==
- List of smoked foods
