= Celebes longfin eel =

Conservation status
- Data Deficient (IUCN 3.1)

Scientific classification
- Kingdom: Animalia
- Phylum: Chordata
- Class: Actinopterygii
- Division: Teleostei
- Order: Anguilliformes
- Family: Anguillidae
- Genus: Anguilla
- Species: A. celebesensis

Binomial name
- Anguilla celebesensis Kaup, 1856

Synonyms
- Anguilla amboinensis Peters, 1866; Anguilla ancestralis Ege, 1939; Anguilla celebensis Kaup, 1856; Anguilla cellebesensis Kaup, 1856

Species of fish

The Celebes longfin eel (Anguilla celebesensis) is an eel in the family Anguillidae. It was described by Johann Jakob Kaup in 1856. It is a tropical eel known from freshwaters in the Western Pacific, including Indonesia, the Philippines, New Guinea, and Western and American Samoa. The eels spend most of their lives in freshwater but migrate to the ocean to breed. Males can reach a maximum total length of 150 centimetres.

The Celebes longfin eel is minorly commercial in fisheries.
