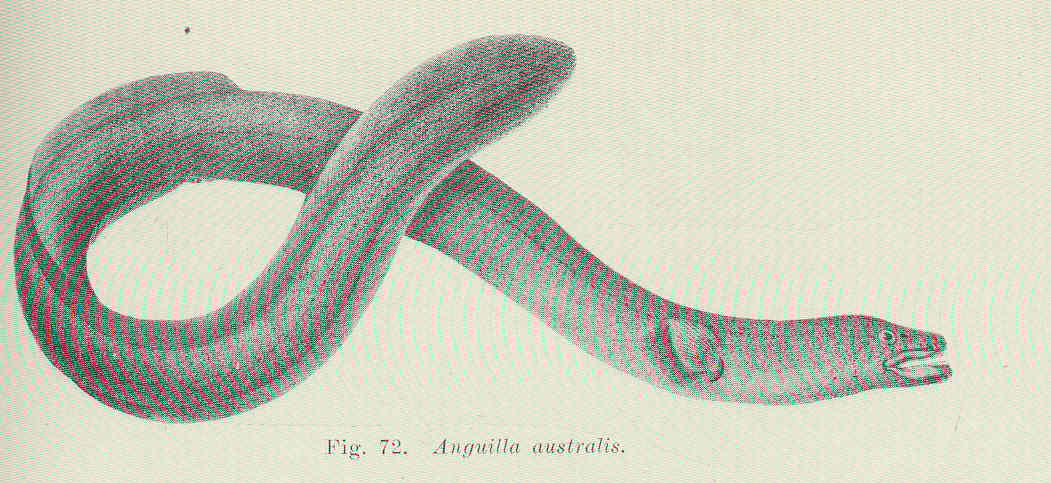

Conservation status
- Near Threatened (IUCN 3.1)

Scientific classification
- Kingdom: Animalia
- Phylum: Chordata
- Class: Actinopterygii
- Division: Teleostei
- Order: Anguilliformes
- Family: Anguillidae
- Genus: Anguilla
- Species: A. australis

Binomial name
- Anguilla australis J. Richardson, 1841

= Short-finned eel =

Species of fish

The short-finned eel (Anguilla australis), also known as the shortfin eel, is one of the 15 species of eel in the family Anguillidae. It is native to the lakes, dams and coastal rivers of south-eastern Australia, New Zealand, and much of the South Pacific, including New Caledonia, Norfolk Island, Lord Howe Island, Tahiti, and Fiji.

== Description ==
The dorsal and anal fins are similar in length

The body of the adult short-finned eel is long and snakelike, roughly tubular and the head is small, with the jaws reaching back to below the eye or further. The dorsal (top) and anal (bottom) fins are of roughly equal length. The colour varies considerably from one individual to another; a deep olive-green is typical but it can be much lighter; golden or even (rarely) yellowish. There are no markings of note, but the underside is pale, often silvery, and the fins greenish. When full grown, they reach about 90 cm (2 ft 11 in). The short-finned eel has a typical regeneration time of 15 to 30 years for females and it reaches a maximum size of about 1.1 m (3 ft 7 in) and 3 kg (6.6 lb). Males tend to be slower growing and reach a smaller adult size.

Anguillid eels are undifferentiated gonochoristic fish. This means that the sex of the animal is determined from an undifferentiated gonad. Differentiation then occurs and an eel becomes male or female, and this is generally correlated to the size (30 cm (12 in)) of the animal, not its age.

== Distribution and habitat ==
They are common throughout the lowlands of New Zealand, including both Chatham and Stewart Island/Rakiura, but tend not to ascend as far inland as New Zealand longfin eels.

In Australia, they are restricted to the area on the seaward side of the Great Dividing Range, from about Mount Gambier in the south-eastern corner of South Australia, through Victoria, Tasmania, the Bass Strait islands, and up the eastern seaboard to the Richmond River in northern New South Wales. Unable to scale the Great Dividing Range, and not extending as far west as the outlet of the Murray River, they are excluded from the thousands of kilometres of waterways that drain inland eastern Australia.

A. australis is the most widely distributed longitudinally of the Anguillid eels, where its larvae can be found just south of Fiji to the north-west of Australia in the Southern Equatorial Current region (14.5–21°S, 154–179.5°E).

During their life cycle however, eels migrate over huge distances to spawn.

== Diet ==
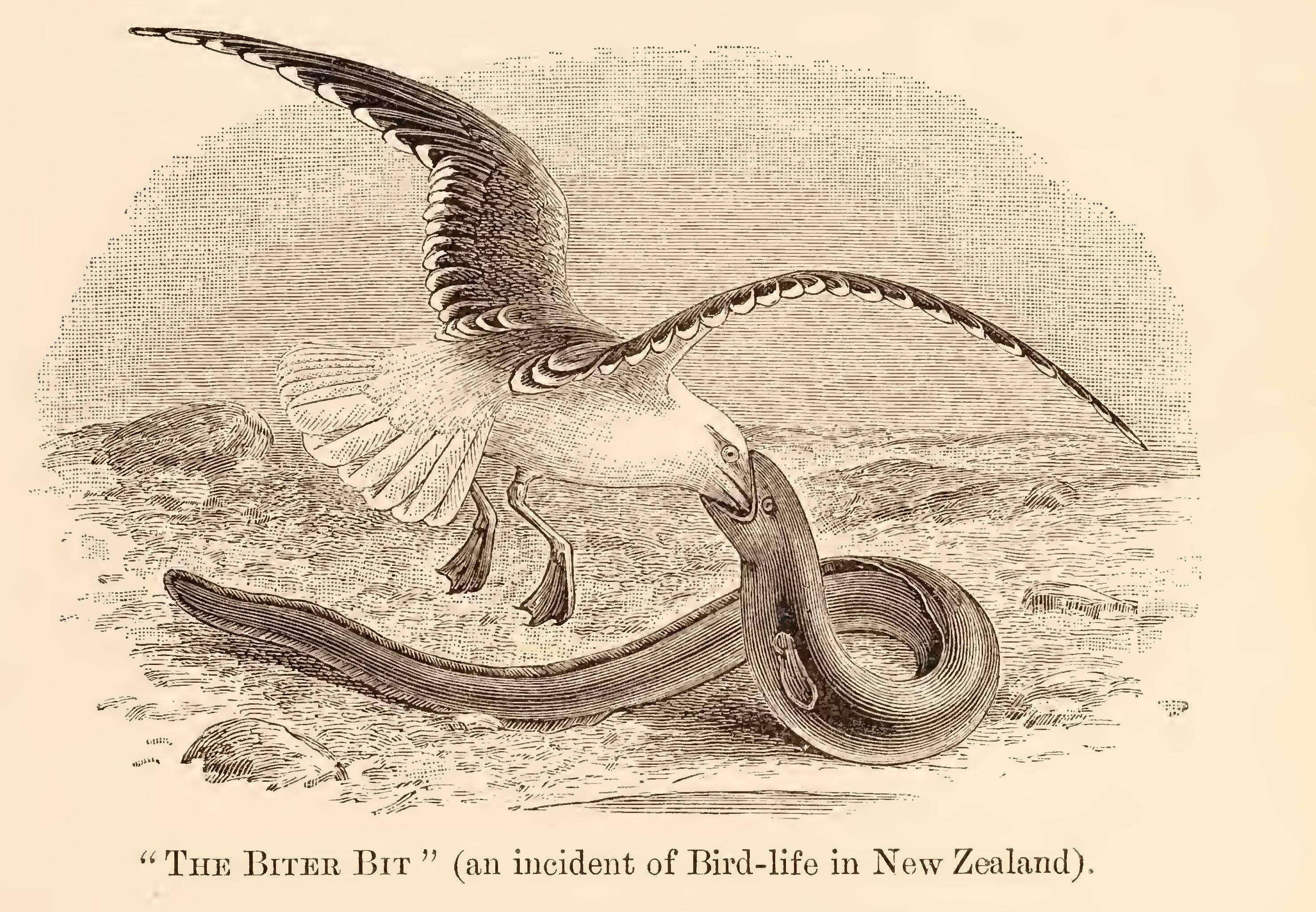
An 1888 illustration of a short-finned eel attacking a black-backed gull in New Zealand

A. australis are carnivorous, ferocious ambush predators, feeding on crustaceans, fish, frogs, snakes, and even waterbirds and aquatic mammals such as rakali.

== Life cycle ==
Like the other anguillids, short-finned eels are catadromous: when they reach maturity, they stop feeding and migrate downstream to the sea, then anything up to three or four thousand kilometres to a spawning ground in deep water somewhere in the vicinity of New Caledonia, Vanuatu, and Fiji. A 1963 estimation based on the four larval specimens available at the time suggested a spawning location between Fiji and Tahiti, though this was commonly stated in the literature and popular accounts as "east of Samoa". Recent captures of larvae and estimations of drift on ocean currents suggest there are A. australis spawning areas to the east and west of Vanuatu.

The larvae recruit from the sea as small adults when they lack colour and are transparent-giving them the name "glass eel". Tropical species have year-round recruitment, whereas temperate species such as the short-finned eel have strong seasonal recruitment. Recent evidence that has utilised analytical microchemical techniques in eel otoliths has suggested that eels are facultatively catadromous rather than obligatory. Discrete populations of ocean and estuarine residents exist, that very rarely enter freshwater.

The leptocephalus ("narrow head" larvae), drift on the ocean currents (off Australia, the South Equatorial Current and eventually reach coastal waters, where they metamorphose into "glass eels" (tiny, semi-transparent eels). At this stage they are unable to eat, and can only eat after reaching an estuary or river mouth, where they metamorphose again into elvers, which are darker in colour. From there, they migrate upstream, traversing numerous obstacles — if necessary, leaving the water and travelling short distances over moist ground. They are well-suited to this task, being able to absorb some of the oxygen they need through the skin.

It is only when they reach about 30 cm (12 in) in length that they hit puberty and it is only then that their sex, which depends on population density, is determined. In an area with many eels, they tend to turn into males, whereas further upstream, where there are fewer eels, they are more likely to become female. Eventually, they take up residence in a lake, swamp, dam or river, typically occupying a home range of about 400 m (1,300 ft) in length, where they remain until they reach maturity at about 14 years for males and 18 to 24 years for females.

At some point, the eels start changing their shape again, to prepare for a trip back into the ocean for spawning. Their digestive system shrinks and their gonads become larger, to make room for the eggs and sperm that they will be making, and they stop eating. Their eyes get bigger, and their heads pointier, possibly an adaptation for better ocean swimming. In the case of the south-east Australian eels, they head north up the east coast, heading for the Coral Sea. A 2021 study by the Arthur Rylah Institute tracked short-finned eels that travelled 2,620 km (1,630 mi) from western Victoria up the east coast to the Coral Sea. The study did not establish where the eels spawned, but the researchers thought that it was somewhere near New Caledonia.

=== Reproductive biology ===
As of 2000, the reproductive biology of these eels has remained elusive during the marine phase. Much is known about the longer freshwater phase from the juvenile to pubertal stage, but much less is known about the marine stage Research done in 2008 identified that tropical species such as A. reinhardtii (Australian long-finned eels) have a shorter larval migration and faster corresponding growth, suggesting a water temperature effect on growth.

Like other anguillids, short-finned eels are remarkably hardy: they can tolerate high water temperatures and low oxygen concentrations, endure long periods without food, and bury themselves in mud or sand and enter an energy-saving torpor when the water temperature drops below 10°C. They are one of the few Australian freshwater fish to have coped well with the introduction of European and American species.

== As food ==
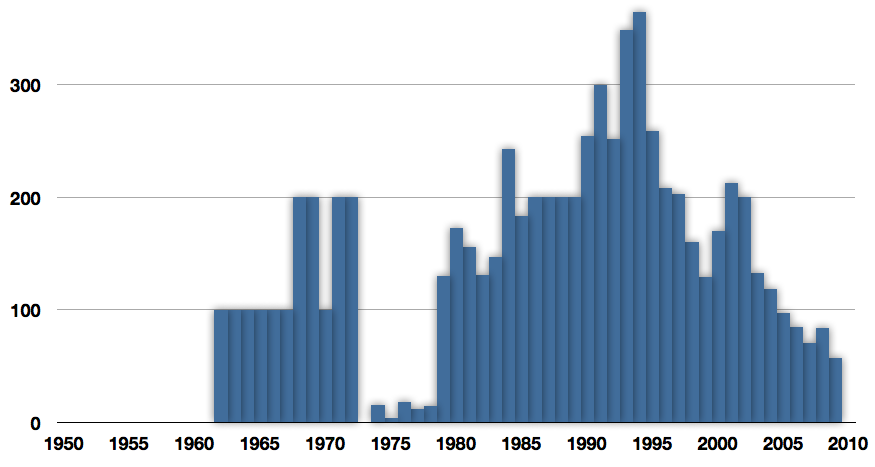
Global wild capture of short-finned eel in tonnes reported by the FAO, 1950–2009

The consumption of short-finned eels is a longstanding tradition in many Pacific nations, including Japan, Australia and New Zealand.

Prior to European settlement at least two Aboriginal Australian nations, the Gunditjmara and the Djab wurrung from Western Victoria, farmed eels on a large scale, trading smoked eel with distant communities in return for other goods.

For the Māori people of New Zealand, starved of protein after the extinction of New Zealand megafauna, the short-finned eel was a significant food resource. The short-finned eel is known to Māori as tuna, alongside the endemic New Zealand longfin eel. One traditional method of preparing eels was to cook them in an umu bound in rangiora or kanono leaves. They had a highly developed fishery for freshwater eels before the arrival of Europeans, and an extensive knowledge of the ecology of eels, harvesting them through a variety of techniques. Present-day recreational anglers catch and eat them regularly, and New Zealand has a well-established commercial eel fishery. Māori are now concerned that the commercial fishery is compromising their ability to harvest short-finned eels for ceremonial purposes.

=== Decline of wild seed ===
The main reason that the aquaculture of Anguillid eels has become more popular in recent times is that the wild seed supply cannot support the demand of the consumer. Because of declining catches of both the European and Japanese glass eels, seed from the short-finned eels is at a commercial premium. The increasing pressure on eels has led to reduced recruitment of juveniles of anguilid species which limits the industry and potentially leads to ecological impacts. Supply of seed to aquaculture operations of these eels relies solely on wild stocks of glass eels. These stocks are declining and there is now pressure being placed on the development of intensive eel culture technology. Anguillid eels cannot be reared from eggs in a culture setting, it is the glass eels caught from wild stock that are reared.

== Aquaculture of the short-finned eel ==
=== History ===
Extensive systems of aquaculture to farm the short-finned eel were developed by the Gunditjmara people of western Victoria, Australia, dating to at least 7,000 years ago in the wetlands created by the Tyrendarra lava flow of the Budj Bim volcano. Today, the areas are protected by three Budj Bim heritage areas. The eel was known as kooyang in the Gunditjmara language.

=== Current industry ===
Since short-finned eels make excellent eating, there is global demand for them. The major market is Japan with smaller markets in other parts of Asia and in Europe. Aquaculture is the single fastest growing animal food producing sector in the world, having an annual growth rate of 6.9%. The worldwide production of Anguillid eels from aquaculture is estimated to be 242 000 t per annum with a value of $US 1 billion. Chinese eel aquaculture production has increased dramatically over the last 10 years, now accounting for 75% of the total annual world production, and relies on the demand of the Japanese market.

Techniques for artificial breeding of the Japanese eel "A. japonica" have been studied intensively since the 1960s. It is difficult to rear these animals in captivity, the main problem being incomplete techniques for inducing sexual maturation and incomplete rearing techniques of larvae.

However the main way that full growth of oocytes is achieved is by repeated injections of salmon pituitary extracts, and also additions of other hormones.

=== Development of the industry ===
The important factors for developing and growing this industry are having viable and reliable seed sources, as well as understanding the basic biology of the animal. This includes an understanding of the times at which spawning in freshwater occurs as well as maintaining a sustainable catch of any given population.

Eel farming was trialled in New Zealand in the 1970s but had limited success. However, the implementation of new technology has made farming a viable option once more, with greater production efficiency. NIWA (National Institute of Water and Atmospheric Research) has begun developing culture and husbandry techniques in freshwater, and will also be investigating trials in saltwater.

New Zealand is in a unique position where the shortfin eel stock, despite heavy exploitation, show little evidence of decline nationally. New Zealand is therefore in a position to enhance global production of shortfin eels and relieve pressure on other stocks around the world in countries such as China, Japan, Korea and Taiwan where aquaculture potential has been limited.

Most eel culture facilities utilise freshwater. However a saltwater eel farm operated in Bristol in the United Kingdom for 15 years, using warm seawater growing eels to a marketable size in 18–24 months (it was shut down for economic reasons).

Water temperature has a notable effect on the metabolic activity of fish species. Anguillids can withstand a wide variety of temperatures but the optimum temperature in cultured species is between 22 and 28 °C (72 and 82 °F)- at this temperature growth is maximised Recent work has determined that the optimal water temperature is for maximal growth of short-finned eels is 26.5 °C (79.7 °F), and salinity is optimum at 17.5%. These parameters were shown to give the highest mean specific growth rate of these eels. It has been shown in the European eel that they achieve higher growth when in saline. Much research continues in this area.

=== Sustainability of aquaculture operations ===
A major problem in the sustainability of aquaculture of these eels is controlling reproduction and larval development. Culture conditions have a skewed male sex ratio from a small body size. This size difference between sexes is seen in eels housed within a tank. Males are smaller than females and some size difference extends 3–270 g (0.11–9.52 oz). Many fisheries therefore concentrate on females, except for the Lake Ellesmere (New Zealand) fishery which consists of a two-thirds male catch. The goal of many aquaculture operations is to favour female development, the most common way is by the addition of hormones however this is not favoured in all areas of the world.

== See also ==
- Long-finned eel
