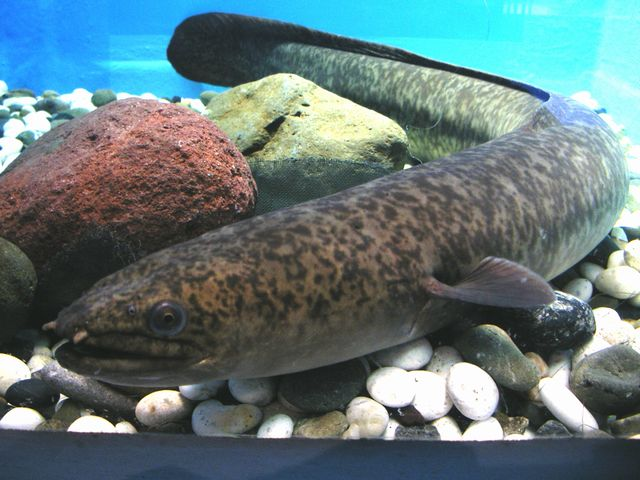

Conservation status
- Least Concern (IUCN 3.1)

Scientific classification
- Kingdom: Animalia
- Phylum: Chordata
- Class: Actinopterygii
- Order: Anguilliformes
- Family: Anguillidae
- Genus: Anguilla
- Species: A. marmorata

Binomial name
- Anguilla marmorata Quoy and Gaimard, 1824

Synonyms
- Anguilla fidjiensis Günther, 1870; Anguilla hildebrandti Peters, 1881; Anguilla labrosa Richardson, 1848; Anguilla mauritiana Bennett, 1831; Anguilla ohannae Günther, 1867; Muraena manillensis Bleeker, 1864

= Giant mottled eel =

Species of fish

The giant mottled eel (Anguilla marmorata), also known as the marbled eel, is a species of tropical anguillid eel that is found in the Indo-Pacific and adjacent freshwater habitats.

== Description ==
Specimen

Similar to other anguillids, the giant mottled eel is cylindrical with small, well-developed pectoral fins and a protruding lower jaw. The eel has thick, fleshy lips. The eel has dorsal and anal fins that are continuous around the tail, with the origin of the dorsal-fin between the pectoral fins and anus. It has small, oval-shaped scales that are embedded in the skin.

Unlike some other anguillid species, this species has a mottled color. The adult eels are yellow with a greenish-brown to black marbling on their back and a white belly. The young elvers have less visible marbling and are grayish to yellow. The dorsal fin of the marbled eel is closer to the gill opening than to the anus, more anterior than other species of Anguilla. Like all anguillid eels, it does not have pelvic fins. The head is rounded and the snout is depressed. Its teeth are small and in bands. It has a total of 100 to 110 vertebrae.

It can grow up to 2 meters (6.6 ft) for females and 1.5 meters (4.9 ft) for males and can weigh up to 20.5 kilograms (45 lb), making it the largest species of anguillid eels. The marbled eel can live up to about 40 years.

== Distribution and habitat ==
This anguillid species can be found from East Africa to French Polynesia and as far north as southern Japan. In Africa, it may be found within Mozambique and the lower Zambezi River. The giant mottled eel has the widest distribution of all the Anguilla eels. It is usually found in tropical climates between 24°N to 33°S. It has also been found in other more distant regions such as the Galapagos possibly due to abnormal larval transport associated with El Niño-Southern Oscillation events. It is not on the IUCN Red List of Threatened Species, but in Taiwan, it is endangered.

In 2002, a single eel was captured from a pond close to Kaupo, Maui, Hawaii, though it is not indigenous to the area.

== Ecology and behaviour ==
Life cycle of eels

The adults of this species are demersal, living on the bottom of fresh to brackish waters, in rivers, lakes, and tributaries. This species and all anguillid eels are catadromous, migrating sometimes long distances out into the open ocean to spawning over deep water. A spawning area of this species is known to be west of the Mariana Islands in an area of the North Equatorial Current in the western North Pacific, but other spawning areas are thought to exist in the western South Pacific and Indian Ocean.

Marbled eels spend their adult lives in freshwater or estuarine habitats, and migrate to the ocean to reproduce. When the eggs hatch, the leptocephali drift in ocean currents for months until they reach estuaries as glass eels where they migrate upstream into freshwater as elvers. Then, after about 8 to 20 years in brackish or freshwater, the yellow eels grow up into silver eels (mature eels), and they return to the ocean for reproduction.

== Feeding ==
The marbled eel is carnivorous, but harmless, with a wide-ranging diet, eating shrimp, crabs, bony fish, and frogs. It is nocturnal, so it is active at night.

== Significance to humans ==
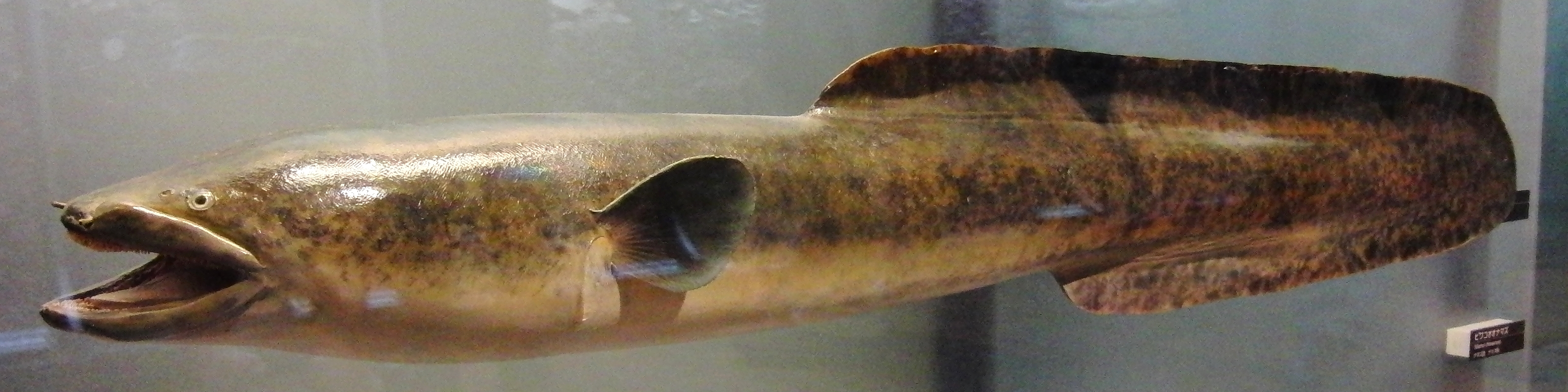
Stuffed specimen in the National Museum of Nature and Science in Tokyo

Like other anguillid eels, this species is used as a source of food in some regions. Some restaurants buy live eels. In 1992, for example, a typical 12 kilogram (26.5 lb) marbled eel retailed for one thousand US dollars in China.

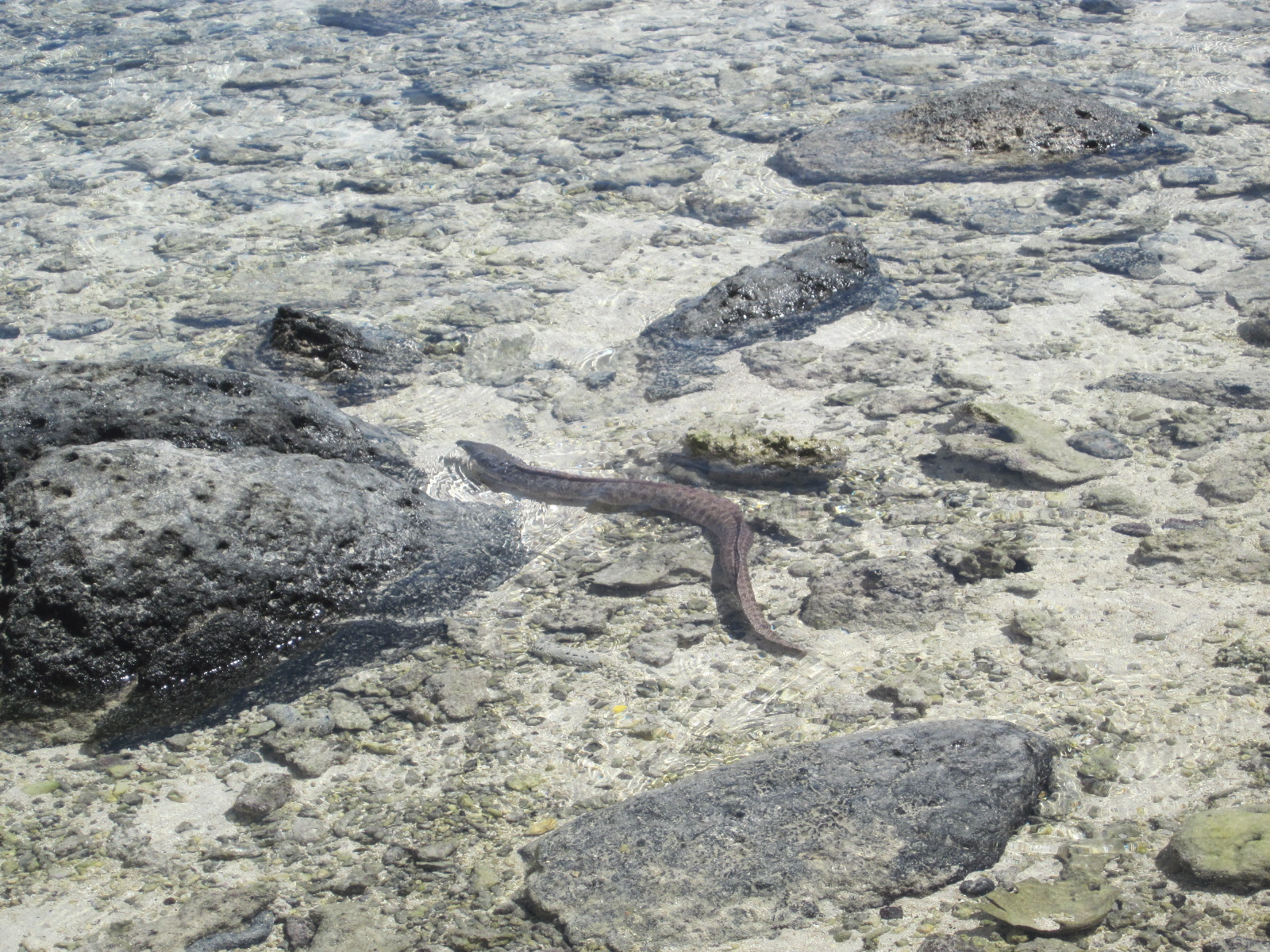
A giant mottled eel in the lagoon of Wallis island (South Pacific).

An eel habitat, Cheonjiyeon Waterfalls' pond, is a natural monument in South Korea.

Large individuals of this species are also highly regarded and are not harmed by native people in some island groups of the western Pacific.
