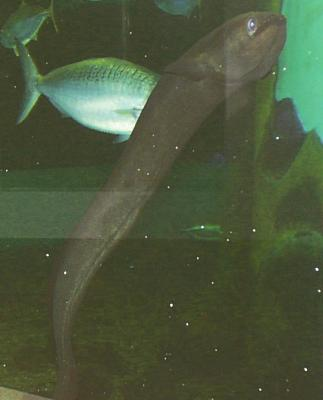

Conservation status
- Least Concern (IUCN 3.1)

Scientific classification
- Kingdom: Animalia
- Phylum: Chordata
- Class: Actinopterygii
- Division: Teleostei
- Order: Anguilliformes
- Family: Anguillidae
- Genus: Anguilla
- Species: A. reinhardtii

Binomial name
- Anguilla reinhardtii Steindachner, 1867

= Speckled longfin eel =

Species of fish

The speckled longfin eel, Australian long-finned eel or marbled eel (Anguilla reinhardtii) is one of 15 species of eel in the family Anguillidae. It has a long snake-like cylindrical body with its dorsal, tail and anal fins joined to form one long fin. The dorsal fin also often extends further than the anal fin. It usually has a brownish green or olive green back and sides with small darker spots or blotches all over its body. Its underside is paler. It has a small gill opening on each side of its wide head, with thick lips. It is Australia's largest freshwater eel, and the female usually grows much larger than the male. It is also known as the spotted eel.

== Description ==
Long-finned eels can grow up to a maximum of 2.6 m (8 ft 6 in) and 70 kg (150 lb), although they generally grow to 1 m (3 ft 3 in) for females while males are much smaller at 650 mm (2 ft 2 in) and 600 g (1.3 lb). Landlocked eels have been reported to grow to 3 m (9.8 ft).

== Distribution ==
The long-finned eel is a native of New Guinea, eastern Australia (including Tasmania), Lord Howe Island, and New Caledonia. It can be found in many freshwater areas, including creeks, streams, rivers, dams, swamps, lagoons, and lakes, although generally more often in rivers than lakes.

== Breeding and migration ==
Like other Anguilla species, the eel lives predominantly in freshwater rivers and streams, but is born in deep waters of the ocean. Each species has its own spawning grounds; spawn use ocean currents to return to their adult species range. The long-finned eel spawns in the Western arm of the Southern Equatorial Current, which carries spawn to the eastern coast of Australia. This species is panmictic, spawning throughout the year.

== Diet ==
A carnivorous species, the speckled longfin eel eats an assortment of aquatic vertebrates, such as fish, turtles, and small birds.

== See also ==
- Short-finned eel
