= Ayiramthengu =

Village in Kerala, India

- Village
- Location within Kerala Location within India
- Coordinates: 9°07′11″N 76°28′53″E
- Country: India
- State: Kerala
- Division: South Kerala
- District: Kollam
- Sub District: Karunagappalli
- City: Oachira
- Time zone: UTC+5:30 (IST)
- Pin code: 690547

Ayiramthengu is a coastal village located in the Oachira Block Panchayat of the Kollam district in the Indian state of Kerala.

The village is situated approximately 30 kilometres (19 mi) north of the district headquarters in Kollam city and about 5 kilometres (3.1 mi) from Oachira town.

== Etymology and significance ==
The name Ayiramthengu (Malayalam: ആയിരംതെങ്ങ്) is derived from Malayalam words and translates directly to "A Thousand Coconut Trees" (ayiram meaning "thousand" and thengu meaning "coconut tree"). This name reflects the historical agricultural character of the region, which is dominated by coconut cultivation, a primary economic activity in the Kollam midland and lowland areas.

== Economy and infrastructure ==
Ayiramthengu's economy is centered around its coastal location, supported by fishing, agriculture, and infrastructure linking it to the wider district.

== Geography ==
Ayiramthengu is part of the Kayamkulam Kayal backwater ecosystem. The main area of the village is a slender landmass separating the backwater from the coast. It is bordered by Azheekal to the north and Kovilthottam to the south.

=== Transport and connectivity ===
- Water transport: The village serves as a designated stopping point for ferry services operated by the Kerala State Water Transport Department (KSWTD), connecting it to Kollam and other locations via the backwater system of TS Canal.
- Kayamkulam IWT Terminal: The village is the official location of the Kayamkulam Inland Water Transport (IWT) Terminal, situated on National Waterway 3 (NW-3). This terminal, administered by the Inland Waterways Authority of India (IWAI), serves as a crucial cargo and passenger facility for the region, despite being named after the nearby town of Kayamkulam.
- Road connectivity: It is linked to the nearby coastal area of Azheekal by the Azheekal-Ayiramthengu Bridge, improving local road access.

=== Local resources ===
- Aquaculture: Ayiramthengu hosts a Government Fish Farm (Ayiramthengu Government Fish Farm), emphasizing its role in local aquaculture and commercial fisheries.
- Environmental importance: The village is ecologically significant due to the presence of mangrove forests, called Ayiramthengu Mangrove Forest, along the backwater edges. These vital ecosystems have been a subject of local environmental protection efforts against encroachment and unauthorized cutting.

== See also ==
- Azheekal Beach
- Alappad
