= Azheekal Beach =

Beach and fishing harbour in Kollam district, Kerala, India

Azheekal Beach Azheekkal Beach
- Beach
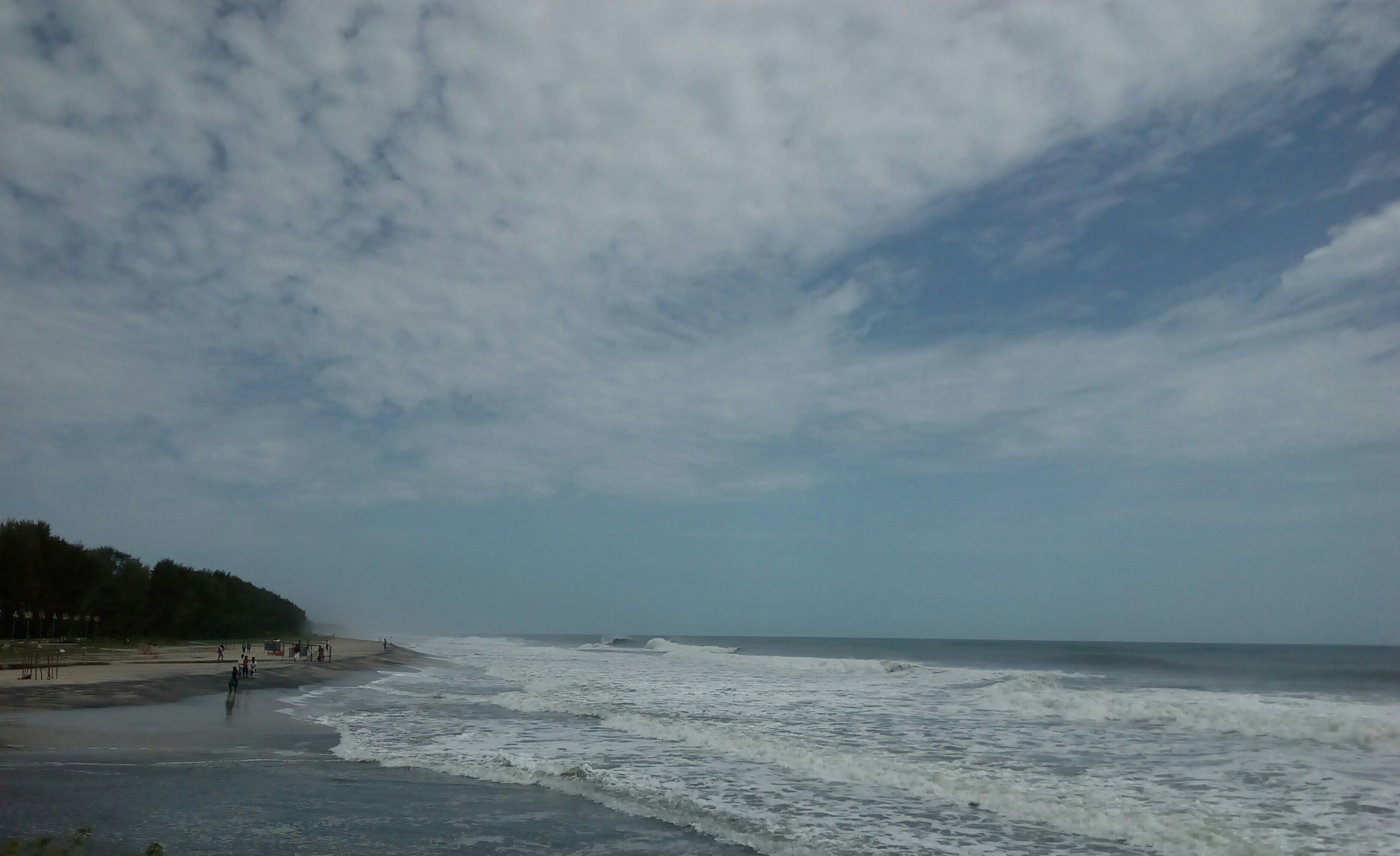
- Azheekkal Beach

- Location within Kerala
- Coordinates: 9°07′55.9164″N 76°27′49.9392″E
- Location: Azheekal, Oachira (via Karunagappally Taluk), Kollam, Kerala
- Range: Alappad peninsula
- Part of: Arabian Sea
- Water bodies: T. S. Canal (to the east)

Dimensions
  - Length: 660 m
- Hazard rating: Low
- Nearest Transport: Karunagappally - 17 km Oachira - 9 km Trivandrum Airport - 110 km

Azheekal Beach is a coastal landform on the Arabian Sea in the Karunagappally Taluk of Kollam district, Kerala, India. It is at the northern end of the Alappad peninsula, a land strip separating the sea from the T. S. Canal. The area is a site for the Azheekal Fishing Harbour and is a center for the regional fishing industry. Following the 2004 Indian Ocean earthquake and tsunami, the beach was identified as a high-vulnerability zone. Modern environmental research focuses on the area due to coastal erosion and the impact of mineral sand mining.

== Location and Geography ==
It is located on the Alappad peninsula, which measures less than 50 meters wide at several points between the Arabian Sea and the National Waterway 3 T. S. Canal The beach is 12 km (7.5 mi) from Kayamkulam and 14 km (8.7 mi) from Karunagappally. Azheekal Beach is approximately 660 meters long.

== Fishing industry ==
The local economy is centered on the Azheekal Fishing Harbour. It supports a fleet of about 180 motorized boats, mostly under 15 HP, which use monofilament gillnets. The harbour is a landing and distribution point for the Kollam district fisheries sector, which directly employs an estimated 100,000 workers.

== Environmental change and mining ==
Data indicates a reduction in the Alappad peninsula's surface area. Lithographic maps from 1955 recorded the village area at 89.5 square kilometers; by 2018, the area was measured at 8.9 square kilometers. Between 1973 and 2020, 59.24% of the coastline underwent erosion.

Local residents attribute this land loss to mineral sand mining by public sector units, including Indian Rare Earth Limited (IREL) and Kerala Minerals and Metals Limited (KMML) These entities extract minerals such as ilmenite, rutile, and zircon from reserves estimated at 127 million tonnes. Research suggests mining contributes to saline water intrusion into local groundwater aquifers.

== 2004 tsunami impact ==
Azheekal and Alappad recorded between 132 and 149 deaths during the 2004 Indian Ocean earthquake and tsunami The village lost 2,194 houses, and another 3,000 were damaged. Research indicates the narrow geography and loss of natural sand barriers increased the vulnerability of residential zones to the waves. Long-term studies identified rates of post-traumatic stress disorder (PTSD) among survivors cited in assessments conducted a decade later.

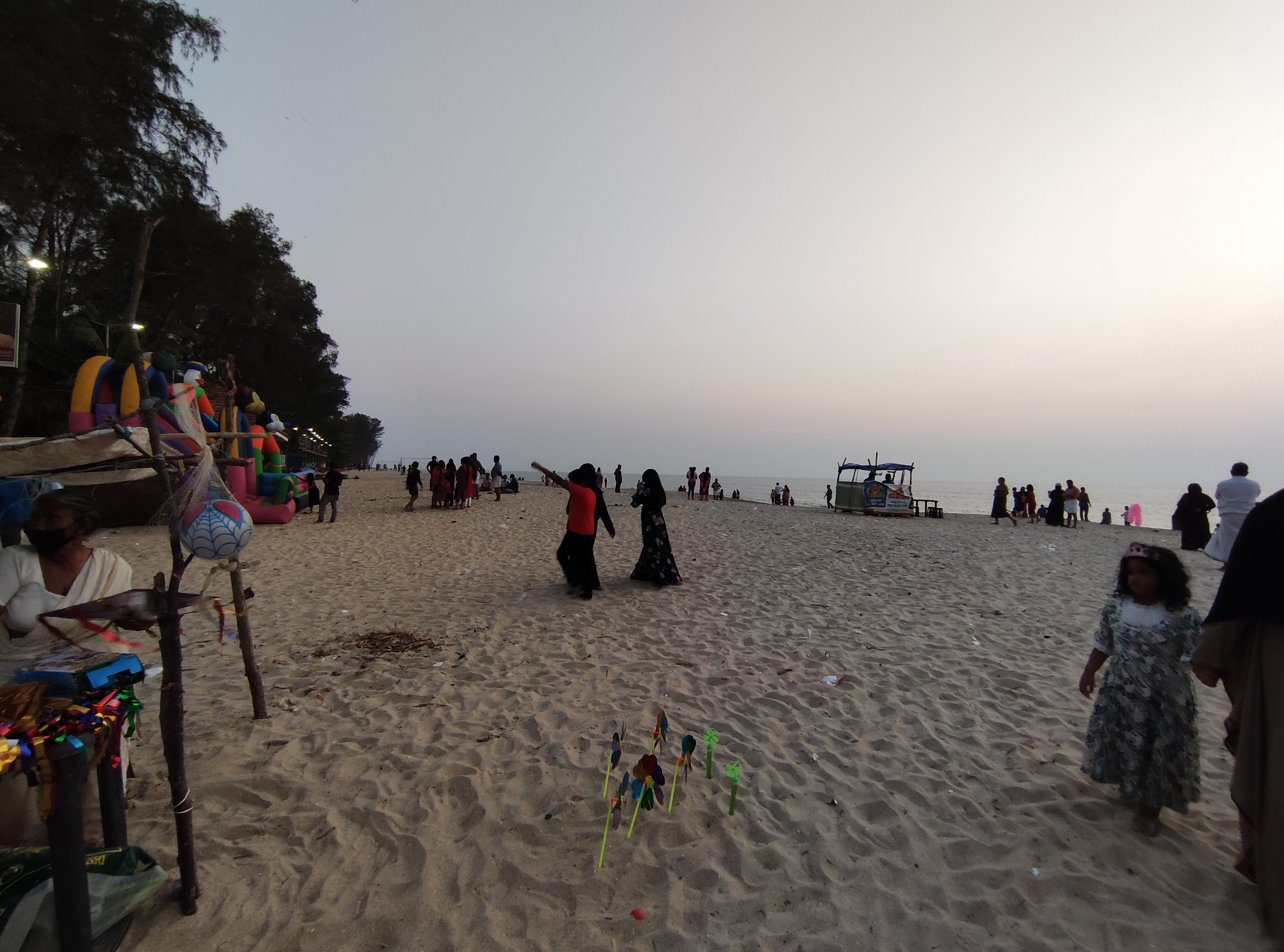
Azheekal Beach

== Tourism and demographics ==
The beach is a site for domestic tourism and features a seaward pier. Activities include swimming and small-scale boating. Agencies maintain a low hazard rating for the area under standard weather conditions.

The population primarily consists of traditional fishing castes, including the Hindu Dheevara and Araya communities. Other groups include Latin Catholics and members of the Ezhava community.

== See also ==
- Kollam
- Alappad
- Fisheries Industry in Kollam
- Valiyazheekkal Bridge
