= Aratupuzha =

Arattupuzha
- village
- Location in Kerala, India Arattupuzha (India)
- Coordinates: 9.2277000°N 76.424622°E
- Country: India
- State: Kerala
- District: Alappuzha

Government
  - Type: Grama Panchayat
  - Panchayat President: N Sajeevan
  - MLA: Ramesh Chennithala
  - MP: A.M. Ariff

Population
  - Total: 29,463

Languages
  - Official: Malayalam, English
- Time zone: UTC+5:30 (IST)
- PIN: 690535
- Vehicle registration: KL-29kayamkulam Rto

Arattupuzha is a village near Haripad of Karthikappally Taluk in Alappuzha district in Kerala, India.

Arattupuzha is the south-west part of Alappuzha district, Kerala, India. It is close to the Arabian Sea and was affected by the tsunami created by the 2004 Indian Ocean earthquake. Kayamkulam Kayal passes through this village. Arattupuzha panchayat is further divided into 18 wards on either side of Kayamkulam Kayal.

The total geographical area of vil] lage is 2270 hectares. Arattupuzha has a total population of 29,463 peoples. There are about 7,471 houses in Arattupuzha village. Kayamkulam is the nearest town which is approximately 13 km away.

== Demand For Merging with Kayamkulam Constituency ==
Arattupuzha is near to Kayamkulam town and heavily dependent on Kayamkulam than Haripad. Also most people of Arattupuzha identify them as Kayamkulam region people and they are demanding for merging Arattupuzha panchayat to Kayamkulam constituency for years. Request for merging is still pending in government.

== See also ==
- Valiyazheekkal Bridge

== Notable people ==
- Arattupuzha Velayudha Panicker: Known as Kallaseril Velayuthan Panicker (7 January 1825 – 3 January 1874) was a warrior of the 19th century in Kerala, India, who fought against oppression of lower castes by the upper castes.
