= Uralungal Labour Contract Co-operative Society =

Indian worker co-operative

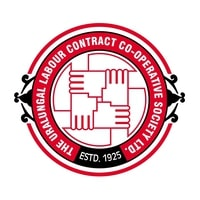
ULCCS logo

The Uralungal Labour Contract Co-operative Society (ULCCS) is recognized as one of the oldest worker cooperative in India. It was founded in 1925 under the guidance of Vagbhadananda in Calicut, Kerala. Managed and owned by workers themselves, ULCCS has successfully completed over seven thousand projects. It specializes in construction works for various government departments including public works department, national highways, irrigation, and tourism.

The ULCCS has successfully undertaken major construction projects in Kerala. These include popular ones like the reconstruction of Palarivattom flyover, which had to be redone following improper constructions by RDS Projects Limited.

== History ==
The Guru (Vagbhadananda) suggested a simple solution: "to start a cooperative group by organizing young people who are willing to work". Thus, on 13 February 1925, the Unemployed Mutual Assistance Group of Mercantile Workers registered a co-operative group. This is the story behind the birth of the Uralungal Labour Contract Co-operative Society (ULCCS Ltd), which has transformed the face of Kerala by building major over-bridges, highways, and fly-overs. - Excerpt from Building alternatives: The story of India's oldest construction workers' cooperative

Few youngsters from the village of Uralungal visited Mahi in 1917 to listen to Vagbatananda, a popular social reformer in Kerala. The advice and teachings of Vagbatananda soon led to the formation of Kerala Atmavidya Sangham. The Sangham wanted to create better livelihoods for their underprivileged youngsters, who were suffering under the caste discrimination of the time. Their idea was to find local construction contracts through the newly created Uralungal Labourer's Mutual Aid and Co-operative Society, later renamed as Uralungal Labour Contract Co-operative Society (ULCCS). The society's first project was the restoration of farmlands which were destroyed in the flood of 1924. The initial projects undertaken by the society consisted of local pathways and meagre structures in the Malabar region. Over the years, the scale and quality of the projects started enhancing.

Palery Kanaran Master became the president of ULCCS in 1952.

Rameshan Paleri was elected as the president of ULCCS in 1995. He is credited with converting the society into a major contractor in the country with a reputation for limited cost and precise schedule.

The most acclaimed works from ULCCS include Valiyazheekkal Bridge, purported as the longest bowstring bridge in South Asia and the renovation of Palarivattom Flyover.

== Activity ==
=== Major roads by ULCCS ===
1. Karamana - Kaliyikkavila Road
2. Calicut City Road
3. Kozhikode Bypass
4. Hill Highway

=== Major flyovers & bridges by ULCCS ===
1. Palarivattom Flyover
2. Valiyazheekkal Bridge
3. Ramanattukara Flyover
4. Korappuzha Bridge
5. Thondayad Flyover

=== Major buildings by ULCCS ===
1. Guruvayoor Car Parking
2. Kalamassery Startup Mission
3. Kunnamkulam Bus Stand
4. KSFE Head Office
5. Mathrubhumi Calicut

The ULCCS Foundation operates a training institute in Kozhikode that caters to the needs of the neurodivergent community.
