= Azheekal =

Place in Kerala, India

Azheekal Azheekkal
- Place
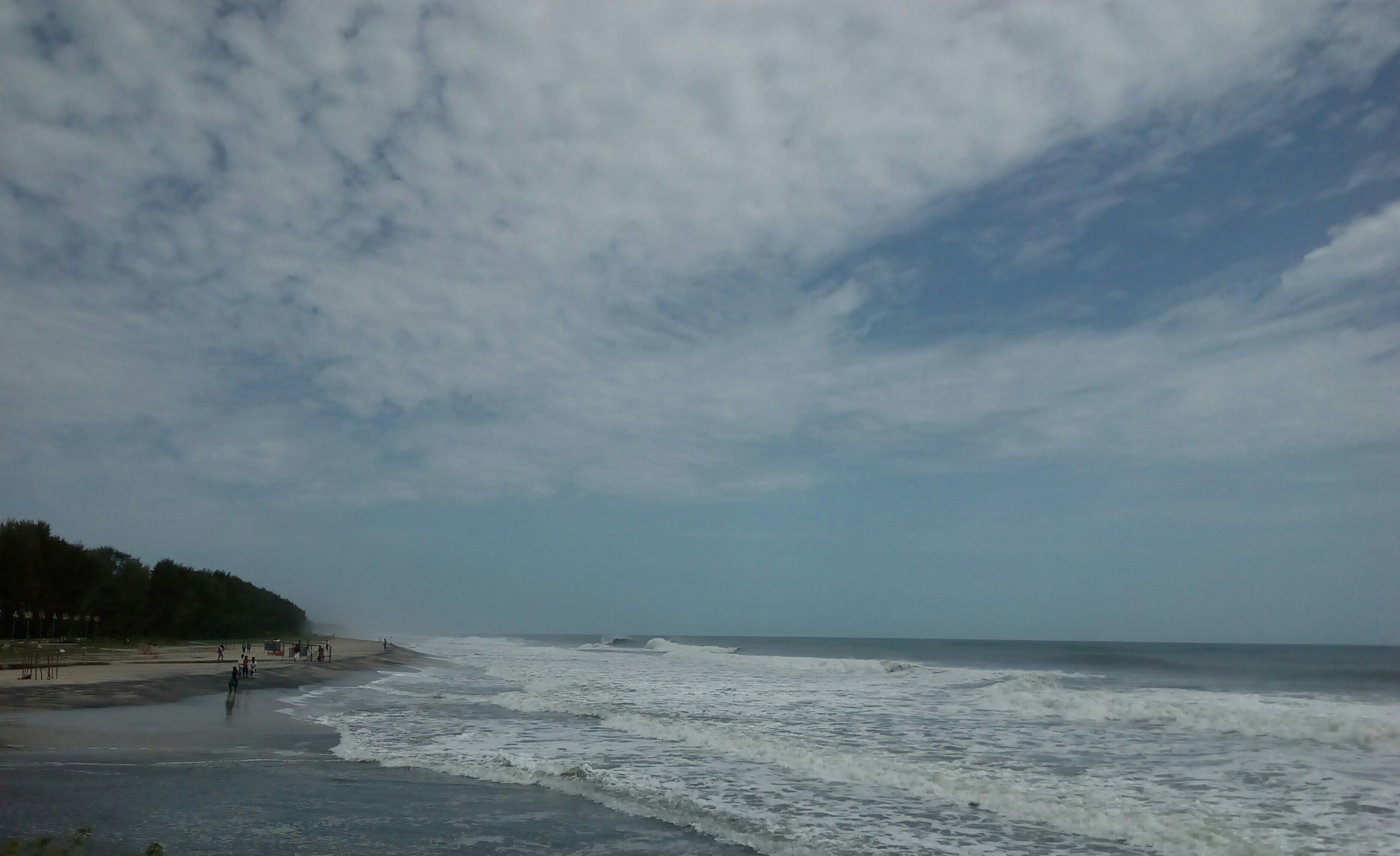
- Azheekkal

- Coordinates: 9°07′55.9164″N 76°27′49.9392″E
- Location: Azheekal, Oachira (via Karunagappally Taluk), Kollam, Kerala.
- Range: Alappad peninsula
- Part of: Arabian Sea
- Offshore water bodies: T. S. Canal (to the east)

Dimensions
  - Length: 660 m
- Hazard rating: Low
- Nearest Transport: Karunagappally - 17 km Oachira - 9 km Trivandrum Airport - 110 km

Azheekal is the name of coastal locations in the Indian state of Kerala, deriving from the Malayalam word Aazhee, meaning the "confluence of backwaters and the sea" (an estuary)

The location is a coastal town situated in the Karunagappally Taluk of the Kollam metropolitan area, and is primarily known for its beach (Azheekal Beach. The primary and most referenced location is a coastal town and fishing harbor in the Kollam district of Kerala, fishing harbor, and significant infrastructure.

== Geography and features ==
Azheekal is located at the northern tip of the Alappad peninsula in Kollam district, facing the Arabian Sea to the west and the Kayamkulam Kayal (backwater) to the east.

Azheekal Fishing Harbour is a major active fishing harbor along the Kerala coast, serving as a vital economic center for the local population.

Azheekal is connected to Valiyazheekkal in the neighboring Alappuzha district by the Valiyazheekkal Bridge. Spanning approximately 1,200 meters across the mouth of the estuary, it is noted as one of Asia's longest tension steel bar concrete bowstring bridges and forms a crucial link in the proposed Kerala Coastal Highway.

Azheekal is connected to Ayiramthengu in the neighboring Kollam district by the Ayiramthegu Bridge. Spanning approximately 759.8 meters across the T.S Canal.

== Environmental impact ==
The coastal sands around Azheekal are known to contain valuable rare-earth minerals, including monazite, which is rich in thorium.

The area was severely affected by the 2004 Indian Ocean earthquake and tsunami, resulting in loss of life, significant erosion, and structural damage along the coastline.
