= Aayiramthengu mangrove forest =

Mangrove forest in Kollam district, Kerala, India

Ayiramthengu Mangrove Forest
- Interactive map of Ayiramthengu Mangrove Forest
- Location: Ayiramthengu, Oachira Block, Kollam district, Kerala, India
- Coordinates: 9°7′33.85″N 76°28′43.21″E
- Area: 25 acres (10 ha)
- Designation: Environmental Hot Spot
- Established: Restoration began in 1998
- Governing body: Department of Fisheries, Government of Kerala

The Ayiramthengu mangrove forest is located in Kollam district of Kerala, India. The forest is adjacent to Kayamkulam Lake and is 25 acres in size.

== Ecology and conservation ==
The mangrove ecosystem was destroyed in 2004 Indian Ocean Tsunami, but it has since been successfully restored. Now it has been designated as an Environmental Hot Spot because of its fragile status and ecological value.

There is a management plan developed by the State Fisheries Department for the mangrove forest, which is an important fish breeding area with ecological value to the area.

In 1998, there was management to restore the area for the introduction of native species of plant life. The mangrove forest has at least 9 species, such as Avicennia marina, Bruguiera cylindrica, and Rhizophora apiculata. The mangrove forest ecosystem also has value as habitat space and shelter for other species, like crabs, snails, and support at least 27 species of the fish in the area.

== Threats ==
Although the mangroves have been restored successfully, they are still threatened by people who are cutting down the mangroves and converting the land to be developed or farmed for agricultural purposes, and they are also threatened by other sources of pollution.
