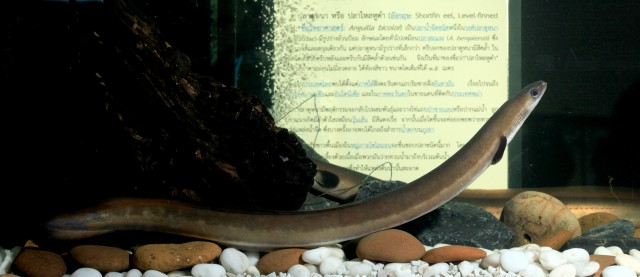

Conservation status
- Near Threatened (IUCN 3.1)

Scientific classification
- Kingdom: Animalia
- Phylum: Chordata
- Class: Actinopterygii
- Order: Anguilliformes
- Family: Anguillidae
- Genus: Anguilla
- Species: A. bicolor
- Subspecies: A. b. bicolor

Trinomial name
- Anguilla bicolor bicolor McClelland, 1844

= Indonesian shortfin eel =

Tropical species of freshwater eel found in Southeast Asia

The Indonesian shortfin eel (Anguilla bicolor bicolor) is a species of freshwater eel (Anguillidae) native to the Indo-Pacific, including East Africa along with South and Southeast Asia. Akin to other species of Anguilla, these eels are catadromous: juvenile stages migrate up from estuaries into river systems, where they metamorphose and grow into the adults. Adults eventually migrate out to sea, back to their offshore spawning grounds to reproduce. However, some individuals may not move into freshwater at all. Like most eels, they are carnivorous, hunting in the benthic regions of freshwater habitats.

A. bicolor is considered one of the most economically valuable eel species in Southeast Asia and has been increasingly fished since the late 2000s. The species is potentially at risk of being overexploited due to their rapid rise in demand, though there is scant information about their historical or current population trends.

== Description ==
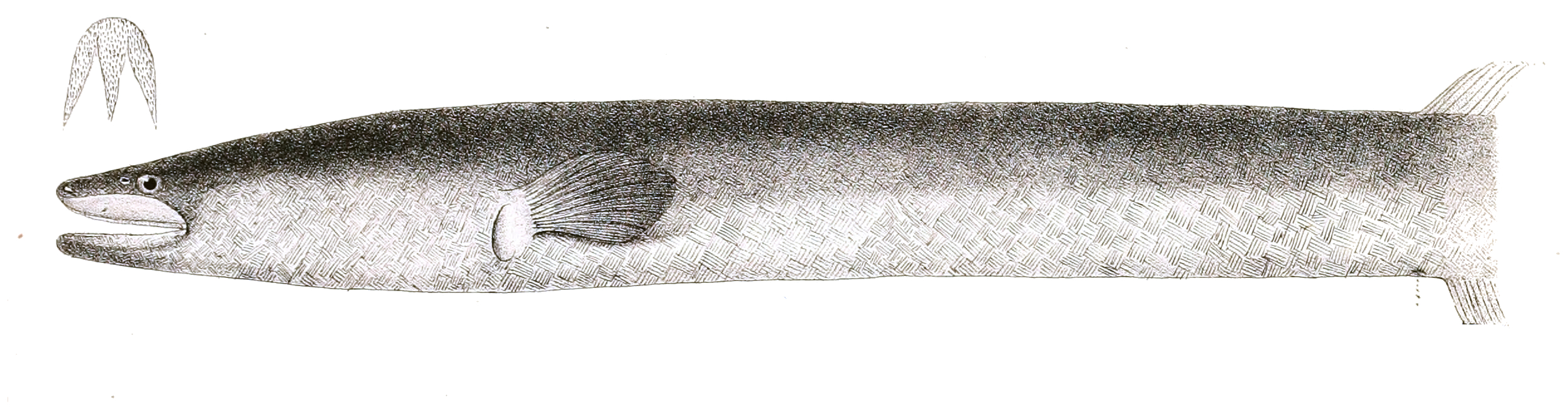
The dorsal fin origins on shortfin eels are only slightly forward of the anal fins

The Indonesian shortfin eel has the typical anguilliform body plan of eels, with an elongated, slender body that allows for high maneuverability and flexibility. Like other Anguilla eels, they lack pelvic fins though retain relatively small but notable pectoral fins. In contrast, their long dorsal and anal fins, which are fused with their caudal fins, allow them to swim via wave-like, sinusoidal, movements. As a shortfin eel, their dorsal fin is only slightly longer than their anal fin, with its origin more forward on the body than the anal fin's origin. In contrast, longfin eels have a much greater distance between the anal fin and dorsal fin along their bodies.

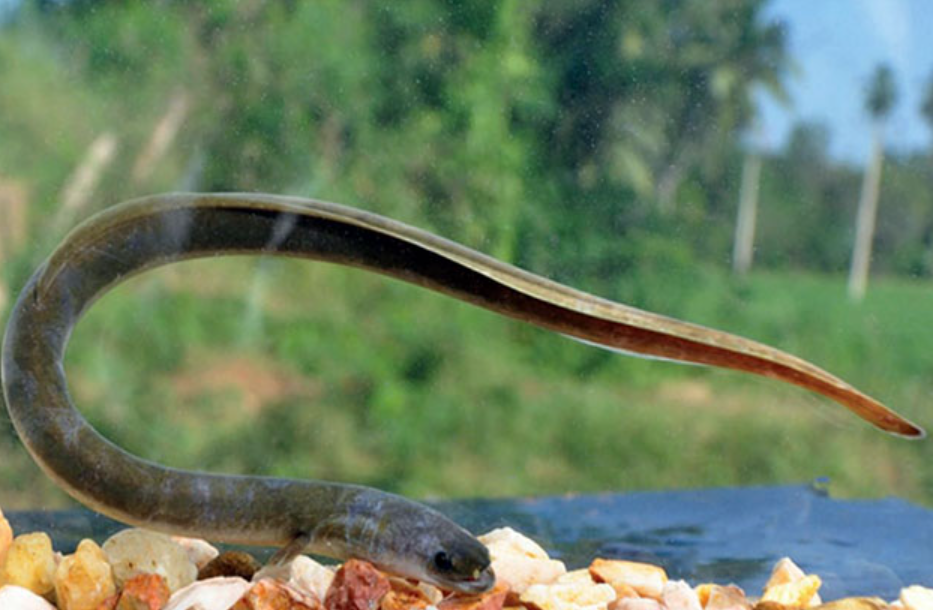
Eel in a photography tank, Sri Lanka

Their body is primarily a gray and brown color, most prominent on their dorsal side, with a lighter tan color on their ventral side. Their length and body weight may vary greatly but range from 411 to 720 mm (16.2 to 28.3 in) and 126 to 1,125 g (4.4 to 39.7 oz) respectively.

== Taxonomy ==
The Indonesian shortfin eel (Anguilla bicolor bicolor) is one of two subspecies of Anguilla bicolor with the other subspecies being the Indian shortfin eel (Anguilla bicolor pacifica). The two subspecies are separated by a number of traits: Indonesian shortfin eels lives exclusively in the Indian Ocean, while Indian shortfin eels reside in the Indo-Pacific region, with Northern & Eastern Indonesia being their inland range. Both subspecies share some of their distribution in areas of Indonesia and exhibit similar morphologies, but may be distinguished through genetic characters; A. b. bicolor and A. b. pacifica are estimated to have diverged about 1.6 million years ago.

== Distribution ==
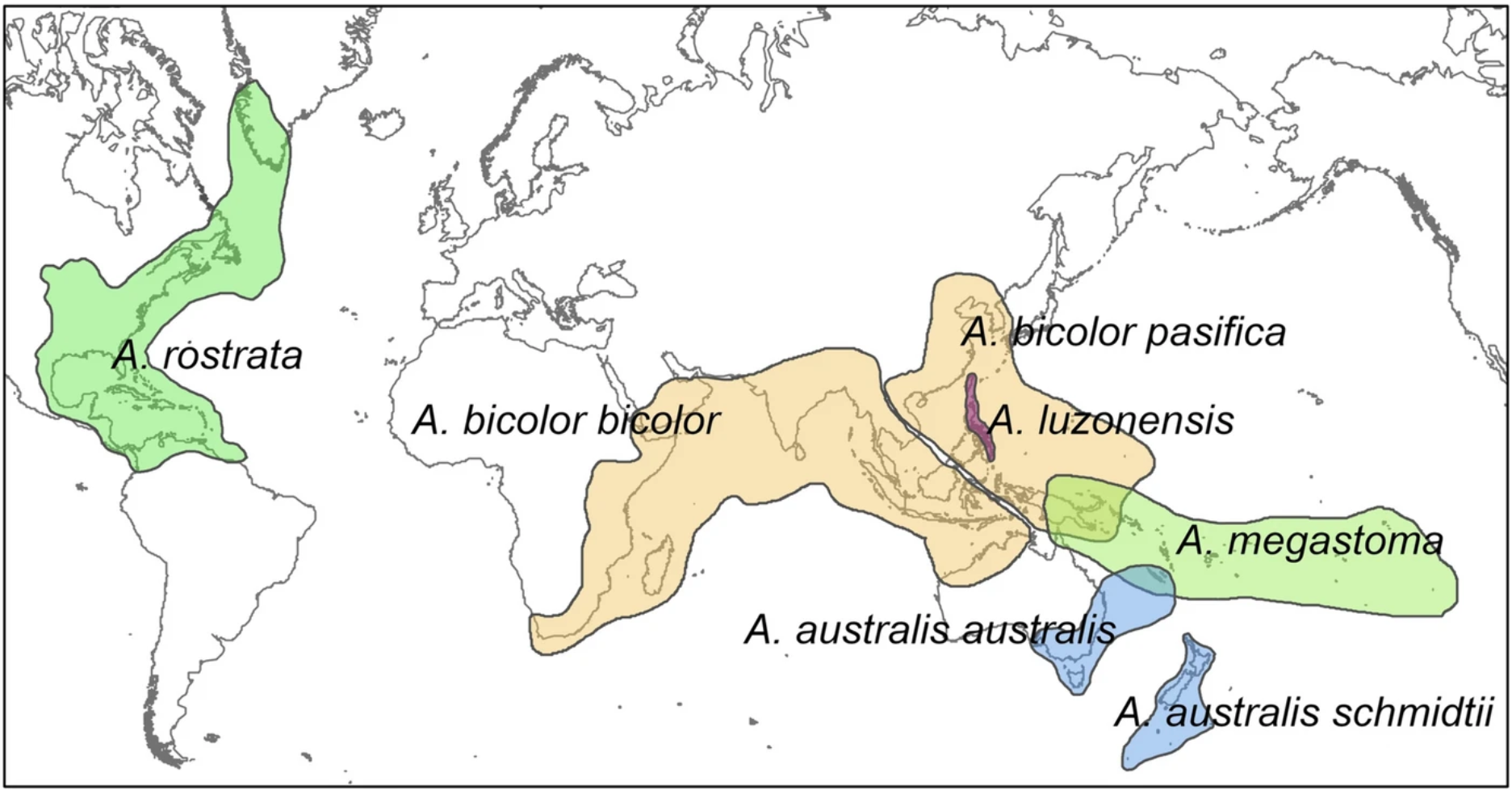
Map showcasing the approximate ranges of distribution for various Anguilla species including both subspecies of Anguilla bicolor.

A. b. bicolor are found exclusively in the Indian Ocean basin in a variety of habitats, but are typically found in freshwater environments. As adults they primarily reside in small creeks, pools, and marsh habitats near the coast, usually avoiding larger rivers. During reproductive seasons, adults will usually migrate towards the ocean like their congeners. However, Indonesian shortfin eels may exhibit a high degree of flexibility in their migration behavior which allow many individuals to not follow the standard strategy of living in freshwater until maturity and reproducing in saltwater: analysis of otolith composition showed some individuals may reside entirely in coastal waters or estuaries, while more migratory individuals move between freshwater, brackish waters, and marine waters freely. This degree of flexibility in migration behavior is similar to some other Anguilla species, which have also been observed to exhibit a similar degree of behavioral plasticity.

== Biology ==
Indonesian shortfin eels primarily reside near the benthic region of water systems. Like many eels, they are carnivorous, preying on small organisms. Shortfin eels in the glass eel stage feed on microcrustaceans and other zooplankton, while older individuals become increasingly piscivorous. Typical of many eels, they are nocturnal.

=== Reproduction ===
Typical catadromous life cycle of Anguilla eels

A. b. bicolor are facultatively catadromous, meaning that they typically reside in freshwater and migrate to marine environments to spawn. This catadromous behavior is likely derived from the full-marine condition of true eel species outside the Anguillidae, and individual Anguilla which reside fully in marine environments are likely to have retained this ancestral marine lifestyle. It is unknown whether the behavioral difference of individuals is related to genetics, or simply behavioral plasticity allowing individuals to select for preferred habitats.

During spawning, female shortfin eels releases eggs into the marine environment which are externally fertilized by the male. The eggs eventually hatch as small, leaf shaped larvae called leptocephali that last until the larvae reach 44.1–55 mm (1.74–2.17 in) in total length. Eventually these leptocephali undergo metamorphosis and become glass eels before they return to freshwater ecosystems. Eventually, elvers develop into yellow eels where they become pigmented and spend several years growing further in freshwater as young adults. A. b. bicolor mature at an approximate age range of 5.5 to 8.5 years which is notably faster compared to temperate eel species, which is likely due to the warmer environmental conditions. The mature adult stage is termed "silver eels", and they migrate back to saltwater. It is thought that this species is semelparous, reproducing once before death, as typical of its genus.

== Relation to humans ==
Indonesian shortfin eels are a commonly consumed species of eel that has seen increasing demand, especially in East Asia, due to the decreasing availability of other Anguilla species. Although the Japanese eel (Anguilla japonica) is often the most preferred form of eel for consumption in many Asian countries, A. bicolor has been regarded as the second most preferred eel species to consume due to the species sharing similar taste and texture with Japanese eel. The Japanese eel has seen significant declines in population size along with other widely consumed species such as the European eel (Anguilla anguilla) and American eel (Anguilla rostrata) in recent decades. As such, the significant population declines in these species have resulted in government intervention and environmental protection plans which therefore limit their ability to be fished. Southeast Asian countries, most prominently Indonesia, have worked to fill in the gap in eel supply for Asian markets by relying more on the harvesting of tropical freshwater eels which directly includes A. bicolor. As such, the Indonesian shortfin eel has continued to grow as an important food source for millions of people in East Asia due to the high demand for eel food products.

Shortfin eels are aquacultured, though farms are reliant on newly recruited elvers collected in coastal regions, which are grown to market size. The use of aquaculture or captive breeding as a means of bolstering Anguilla populations is currently not a practical option due to the fact that cultivation facilities rely entirely on capturing wild glass eels and elvers.

=== Conservation Status ===
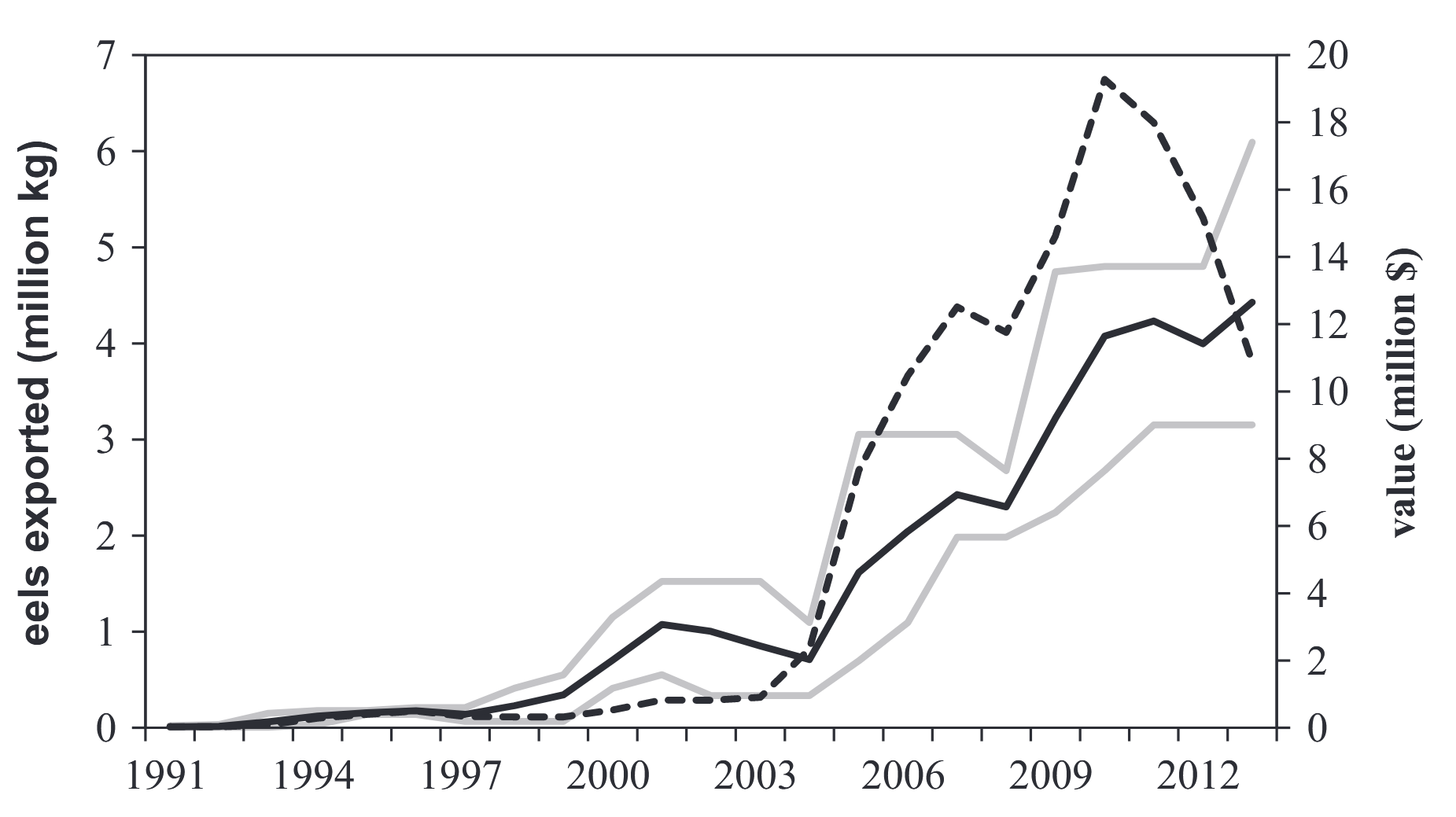
Export of Anguilla eel species from Indonesia between 1989 – 2013. Solid black line represents 3 year averages for eel exports and dotted line represents 3 year average monetary values.

Due to increasing demand of eels for consumption, particularly in East Asia, the fishing and export of tropical freshwater eel species such as A. bicolor has grown rapidly within recent decades. In particular, the listing of European eel (Anguilla Anguilla) on Appendix II of the 2007 Convention on International Trade in Endangered Species (CITES) of Wild Fauna and Flora in the EU and complete ban of European eel exports in 2010 has been contributed as a major influence for the rise in A. bicolor exports. The European eel had been listed as critically endangered in 2008 by the International Union for Conservation of Nature (IUCN) with a major contributing factor being attributed to overfishing and the high consumer demand for eels in Europe and Asia. Due to these government regulations for the European eel, the high demand for eels created a gap in supply that has been filled in by other nations, most prominently Indonesia, by relying on the export of tropical Asian eel species such as A. bicolor. Indeed, the overexploitation of local populations or entire species of eel and resulting shift towards other species has been a consistent historical trend which is likely happening again with the Indonesian shortfin eel.
