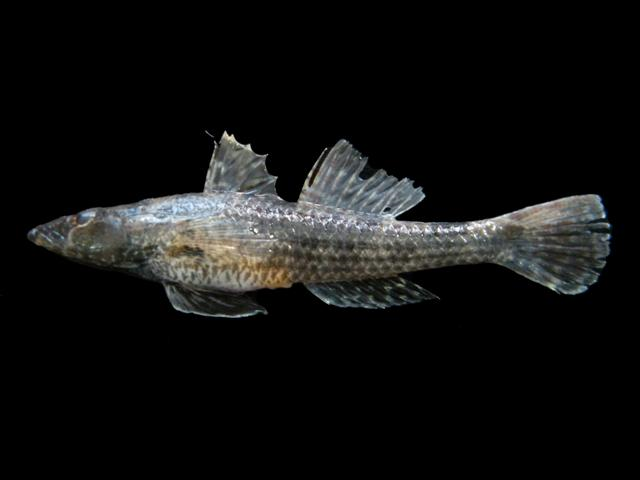
- Psammogobius biocellatus

Scientific classification
- Kingdom: Animalia
- Phylum: Chordata
- Class: Actinopterygii
- Order: Gobiiformes
- Family: Gobiidae
- Genus: Psammogobius; J. L. B. Smith, 1935

Type species
- Psammogobius knysnaensis J. L. B. Smith, 1935

= Psammogobius =

Genus of fishes

Psammogobius is a genus of fish in the family Gobiidae found in the Atlantic, Indian and Pacific Ocean.

== Species ==
There are currently 4 recognized species in this genus:

- Psammogobius biocellatus (Valenciennes, 1837) (Sleepy sandgoby)
- Psammogobius knysnaensis J. L. B. Smith, 1935 (Knysna sandgoby)
- Psammogobius pisinnus Allen, 2017 (Sandslope goby)
- Psammogobius viet Prokofiev, 2016
