= Fisheries Industry in Kollam =

Fisheries in Kollam, India

The fisheries industry in Kollam is a major economic driver for the city and the surrounding region. Kollam is located on the coast of Kerala, India, and has a number of major fishing ports. The city is also home to a number of fish processing plants, and it is a major exporter of fish products.

The fisheries industry in Kollam has a long history. The city has been a major fishing center for centuries, and it was once the capital of the erstwhile princely state of Travancore. The industry has grown significantly in recent years, and it is now one of the most important economic sectors in Kollam. Fuel pumps operating in the Neendakara, Shaktikulangara, Alappad and Azheekal areas.

27 fishing villages are present in Kollam district. The fishing sector directly employs around 100,000 people, and the fish processing sector employs around 50,000 people. The industry also indirectly employs a large number of people in supporting activities, such as boat building, ice making, and transportation. The main types of fish caught in the area are sardines, mackerel, tuna, and shrimp. The fish processing plants in Kollam produce a variety of products, including frozen fish, canned fish, and fishmeal. It is mostly export-oriented, and the main export markets are the Middle East, Europe, and the United States.

== Indo-Norwegian Project ==
Indo-Norwegian Project, started in 1953 in Neendakara, Kollam on the basis of a tripartite agreement between the United Nations, the Government of India and the Government of Norway. It is said, inter alia, that the Government of Norway will "assist the Government of India in carrying out a programme of development Projects to contribute to the furtherance of the economic and social welfare of the people of India"

== Inland Fisheries ==
Ashtamudi Lake and Azheekal Lake are major contributors to the inland fisheries in Kerala. The clam fishery in Ashtamudi Lake began in 1981 and supports the livelihoods of around 3,000 fisherfolk involved in collecting, cleaning, processing, and trading clams. The growth of the commercial fishery in Ashtamudi was driven by demand from Vietnam, Thailand, and Malaysia in the 1980s and 1990s. The catch peaked at 10,000 tonnes per year in 1991, but declined by 50% in 1993 due to overfishing.

== Main fishing harbors in Kollam ==
- Neendakara Fishing Harbour: This is the largest fishing harbor in Kollam. It is located 8 km from Kollam city, and it is a major center for the fishing industry in Kerala. The harbor has a capacity to accommodate over 500 fishing boats, and it is a major source of fish for the domestic and export markets.
- Vaadi Fishing Harbour: This is a smaller fishing harbor located near Kollam port.
