= Rajiv Gandhi Combined Cycle Power Plant =

Power plant in India

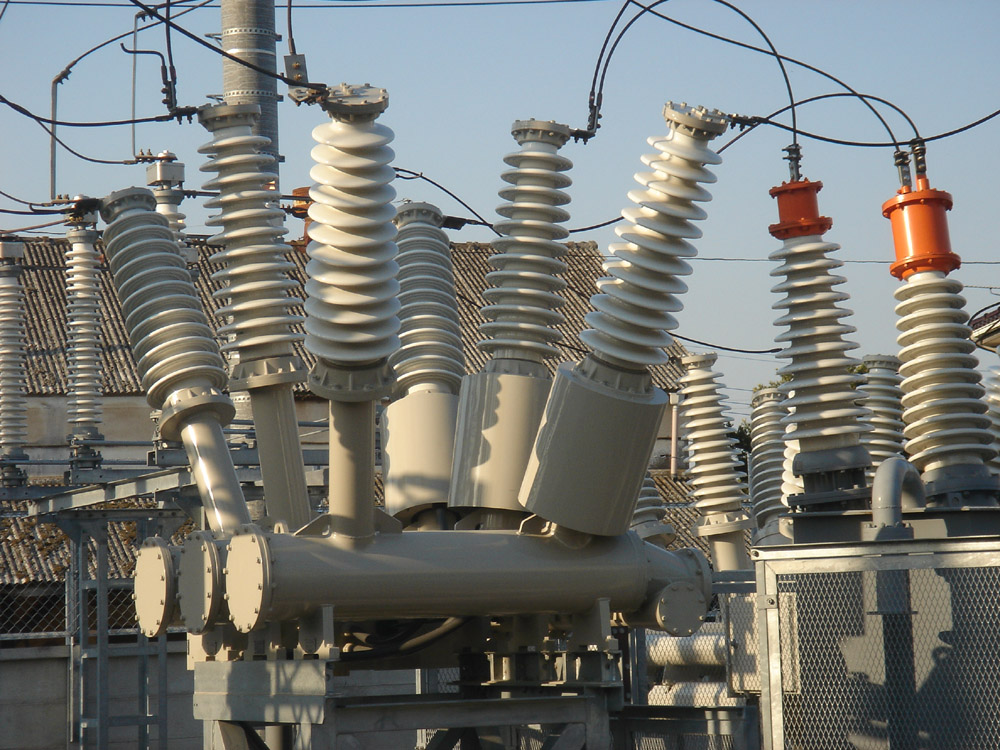
- Location of the Rajiv Gandhi Combined Cycle Power Plant in Kerala
- Official name: രാജീവ് ഗാന്ധി സംയുക്ത സൈക്കിൾ പവർ പ്ലാൻ്റ്
- Country: India
- Location: Choolatheruvu, Muthukulam, Haripad, Alappuzha district, Kerala.
- Coordinates: 9°14′20″N 76°25′49″E
- Status: Operational
- Commission date: Unit 1: November 1998; Unit 2: February 1999; Unit 3: October 1999
- Construction cost: A lot
- Owner: Government of India
- Operator: NTPC Limited

Thermal power station
- Primary fuel: Naphtha
- Combined cycle?: Yes

Power generation
- Units operational: 2 X 115 MW; 1 X 120 MW
- Nameplate capacity: 350; 1,400 MW (Planned)

The Rajiv Gandhi Combined Cycle Power Plant or Haripad Thermal Power Plant (also known as Rajiv Gandhi CCPP) is a combined cycle power plant located at shore of Kayamkulam Lake in Haripad which is Alappuzha district, Kerala, India. The power plant is owned by NTPC Limited. The power plant is fueled by imported and indigenous naphtha. Source of the cooling water is Achankovil river at Nalukettumkavala in Pallipad.

== Capacity ==
Stage	Unit Number	Installed Capacity (MW)	Date of Commissioning	GT / ST
1st	1	115	1998 November	GT
1st	2	115	1999 February	GT
1st	3	120	1999 October	ST
Total	Three	350		

There is a plan to expand the plant by three units with capacity of 350 MW each. New units would be fueled by re-gasified liquefied natural gas.

== See also ==
- NTPC Haripad Floating Solar Power Plant
