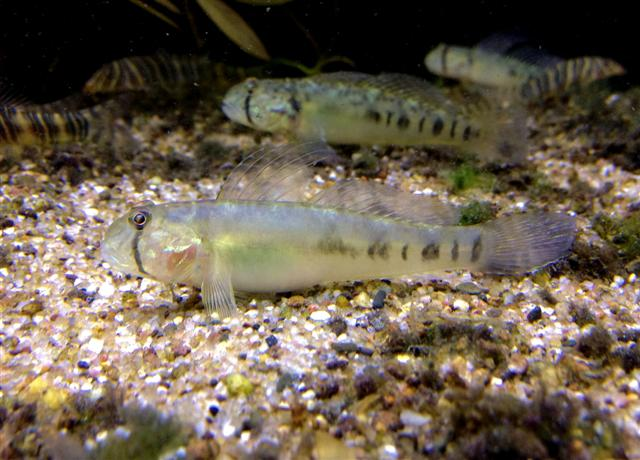
- Oligolepis acutipennis

Scientific classification
- Kingdom: Animalia
- Phylum: Chordata
- Class: Actinopterygii
- Order: Gobiiformes
- Family: Oxudercidae
- Subfamily: Gobionellinae
- Genus: Oligolepis; Bleeker, 1874

Type species
- Gobius melanostigma Bleeker, 1849

Synonyms
- Aparrius Jordan & Richardson, 1908; Waitea Jordan & Seale, 1906

= Oligolepis =

Genus of fishes

Oligolepis is a genus of fish in the goby family Gobiidae, native to marine, fresh and brackish waters of the coastal areas of the Indian Ocean and the western Pacific Ocean.

== Species ==
There are currently 7 recognized species in this genus:

- Oligolepis acutipennis (Valenciennes, 1837) (Sharptail goby)
- Oligolepis cylindriceps (Hora, 1923)
- Oligolepis formosanus (Nichols, 1958)
- Oligolepis jaarmani (M. C. W. Weber, 1913)
- Oligolepis nijsseni (Menon & Govindan, 1977)
- Oligolepis oligolepis (Bleeker, 1854)
- Oligolepis stomias (H. M. Smith, 1941)

The genera Oligolepis and Oxyurichthys were rearranged by Larsson and Pezold in 2015 and O. keiensis was moved to Oxyurichthys while two other species Oligolepis formosanus and Oligolepis nijsseni were added to this genus.
