= Oligolepis formosanus =

Scientific classification
- Domain: Eukaryota
- Kingdom: Animalia
- Phylum: Chordata
- Class: Actinopterygii
- Order: Gobiiformes
- Family: Oxudercidae
- Genus: Oligolepis
- Species: O. formosanus

Binomial name
- Oligolepis formosanus (Nichols, 1958)

Synonyms
- Oxyurichthys formosanus Nichols, 1958; Oxyurichthys nijsseni Menon & Govindan, 1977; Oxyurichthys jaarmani (non Weber, 1913)

Species of fish

Oligolepis formosanus is a species of goby found in the Indo-West Pacific. This species reaches a length of 5 cm (2.0 in).
