= Srayikkadu =

- village
- Location in Kerala, India Srayikkadu (India)
- Coordinates: 9.1002635°N 76.4781797°E
- Country: India
- State: Kerala
- District: Kollam
- Panchayat: Alappad

Government
  - Type: local self government
- Elevation: 14 m (46 ft)

Languages
  - Official: Malayalam, English
- Time zone: UTC+5:30 (IST)
- PIN: 690547
- Telephone code: +91 (0)4762
- Vehicle registration: KL-23

Srayikkadu is a coastal village in Kerala, India. It is in Kollam district. Srayikkadu is part of Alappad panchayat which is part of karunagappally Taluk situated on a narrow strip of land sandwiched between the Arabian Sea and the T S Canal.The village is connected to the mainland by bridges as well as by country boat ferries. The main nearby places Karunagappally, Kayamkulam, Ochira are connected by roads. By water, it is connected to various places like Alappuzha, Kollam. Mata Amritanandamayi Math is 1 km away from this small village as well. It is a green land with backwaters and beaches.
