= Cheriazheekkal =

Village in Kerala, India

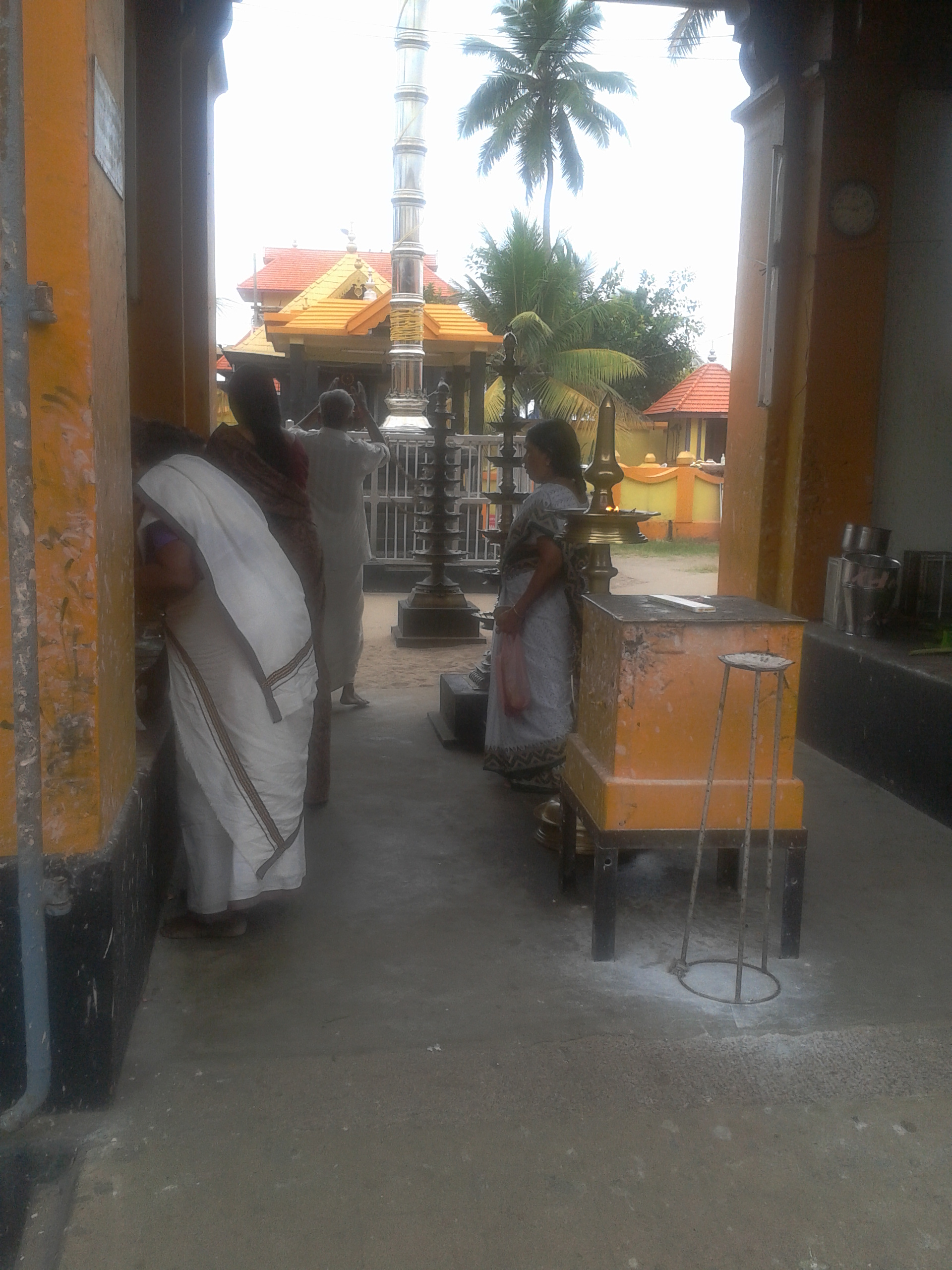
Kashi Vishwanatha Temple

Cheriazheekkal or Cheriazheeckal is a village in the Alappad panchayat in the town of Karunagapalli in Kerala, India.
