= Vellanathuruthu =

Indian village

Vellanathuruthu is a serene coastal area and island village located in the Alappadu Panchayat of the Kollam District in Kerala. It is known for its distinct geography, rich mineral deposits, and significant environmental challenges, primarily related to industrial sand mining. Vellanathuruthu is in the Kollam District along the southwest coast of India. It is situated in the environmentally sensitive Neendakara – Kayamkulam coastal stretch. The area is a micro-tidal coast. The shoreline orientation changes in this region, with noticeable dents and caving in of the beach at the Vellanathuruthu mining site due to high-energy waves and human activities.

The region is an important ecological habitat, particularly recognized as an bird hotspot that attracts various bird species, including migratory shorebirds like the endangered Great Knot, during their seasonal visits. The local environment is vital for maintaining the balance of the coastal ecosystem.

== Black sand mining ==
Vellanathuruthu sits on a globally renowned stretch of the Chavara coast that contains rich placer deposits, or "black sand," which are abundant in heavy minerals like ilmenite, zircon, rutile, monazite, garnet, and sillimanite. The primary industrial activity is heavy mineral sand mining, conducted by state-owned companies such as Indian Rare Earths Ltd. (IREL) and Kerala Minerals and Metals Ltd. (KMML) since the mid-20th century. Rampant and unsustainable sand mining has led to severe coastal erosion and a retreating shoreline. Studies have indicated that the mining rate exceeds the natural replenishment rate of the sand, causing the shoreline to cave in by as much as 120–200 meters in critical locations.

== Equatorial launching station ==
When selecting the location for India's first rocket launch site, a team led by Vikram Sarabhai considered several places. They nearly settled on Vellanathuruthu in Kollam, as surveys showed the magnetic equator passed directly through it. However, the location was ultimately rejected due to its name. Upon learning that "Vellanathuruthu" translates to "White Elephant Sand Bar," Sarabhai became concerned the government would view the project as a "white elephant" (a costly, useless endeavor) and decided against it. Thumba was then chosen as the final site for what is now the Vikram Sarabhai Space Centre (VSSC).
