= Kuzhithura =

- village
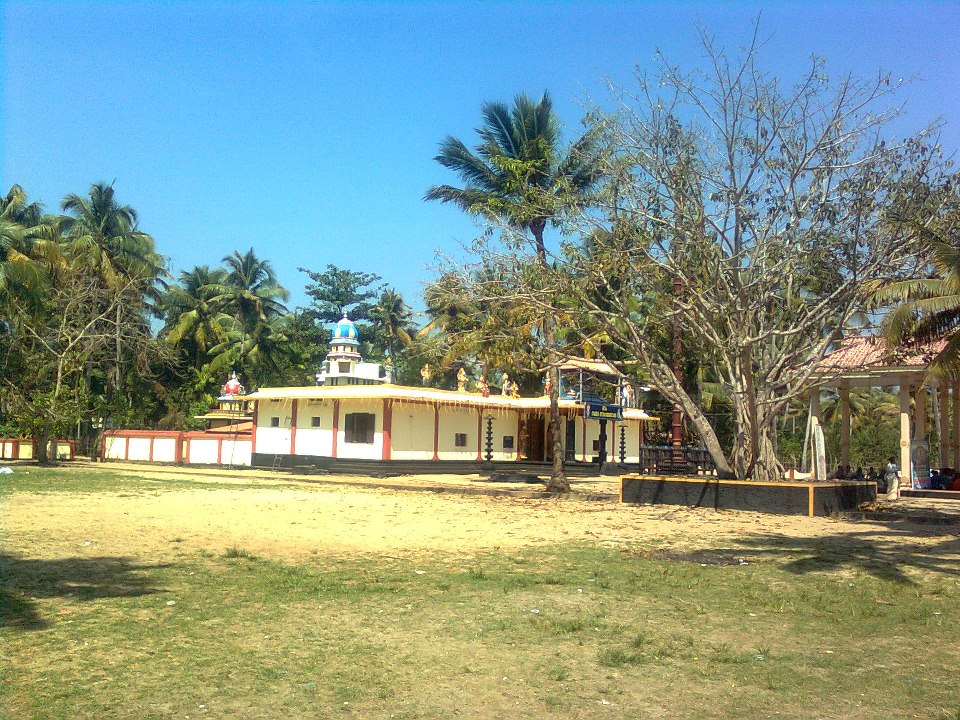
- Sree Krishnaswamy Temple
- Interactive map of Kuzhithura
- Coordinates: 9.0788572°N 76.49158°E
- Country: India
- State: Kerala
- District: Kollam
- Panchayat: Alappad
- Elevation: 14 m (46 ft)

Languages
  - Official: Malayalam, English
- Time zone: UTC+5:30 (IST)
- PIN: 690542
- Telephone code: +91 (0)4762
- Vehicle registration: KL-23

Kuzhithura is a village in the Kollam district of the Indian state of Kerala. Kuzhithura is part of Alappad panchayat, which is part of the Karunagappally Taluk, situated on a narrow strip of land sandwiched between the Arabian Sea and the Thiruvananthapuram–Shoranur canal. It is a tourist destination with green land, backwaters, and beaches.

== Demographics ==
The village has total of 400 houses and 401 households. 94.50% of the houses are pucca, 5% are semi-pucca and .5% are kaccha. All the houses are electrified.

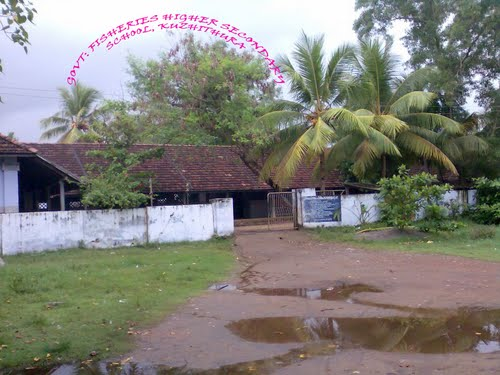
Govt. Fishery Hidher Secondary School Kuzhithura

== Sree Krishnaswamy Temple ==
Sree Krishnaswamy Temple Kuzhithura (also called Kuzhithura Sree Krishnaswamy Temple) is one of the oldest Krishna temples in Kerala. It is located near the Thiruvananthapuram–Shoranur canal. An annual temple festival occurs between January and February, drawing large crowds.

== Educational institutions ==
For education, there are two anganwadis and the Govt. Fishery Higher Secondary School for older students.

== Geography ==
Kuzhithura is located 8 km from Karunagappally and 10 km from Ochira by road. The nearest rail stations are in Karunagappally and Kayamkulam. The nearest international airports are 97 km at Thiruvananthapuram and 145 km at Kochi.

The village is connected to the mainland by bridges as well as by country boat ferries. By water, it is connected to Alappuzha and Kollam. Mata Amritanandamayi Math is 1 km away.
