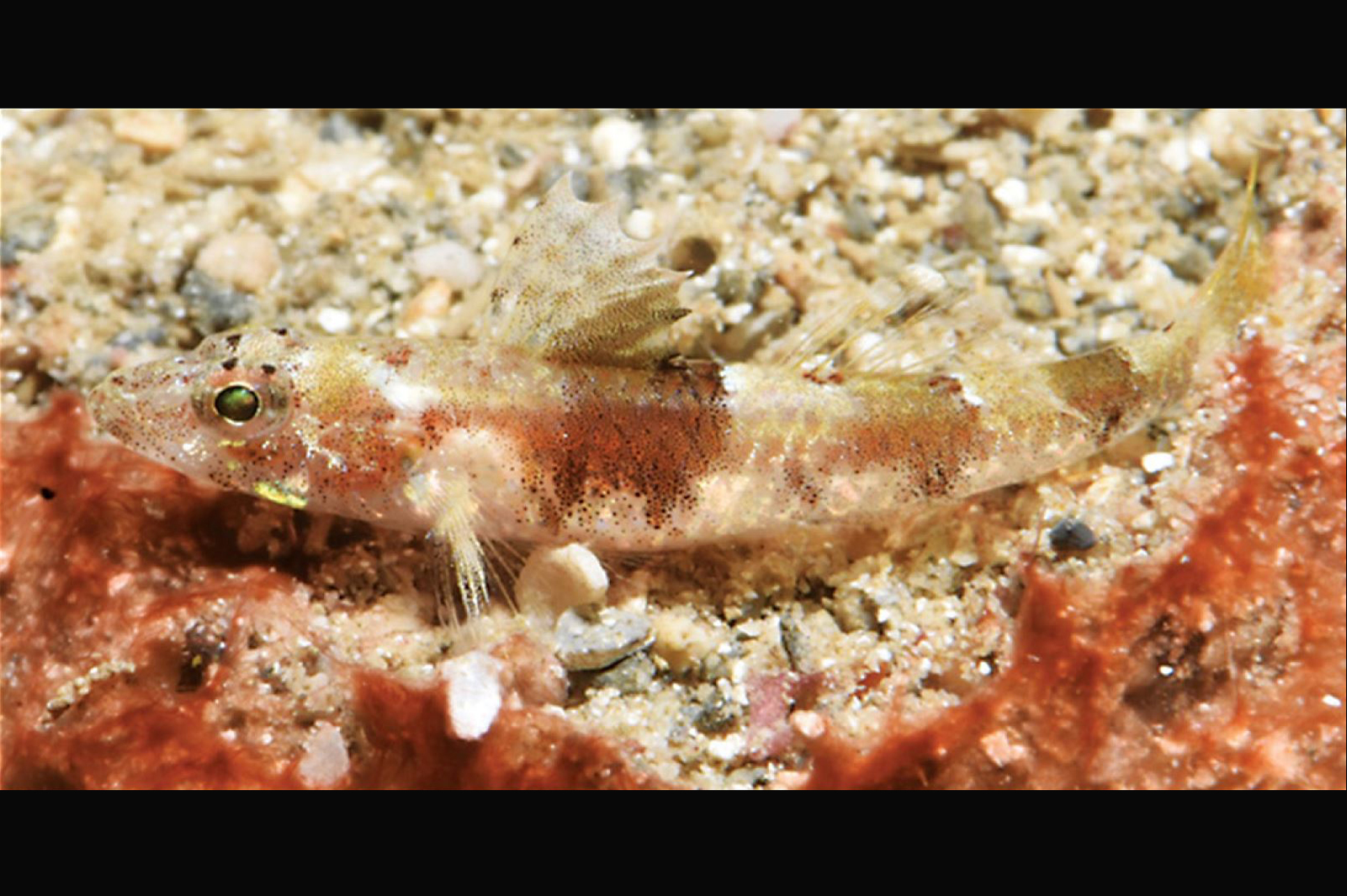

Scientific classification
- Kingdom: Animalia
- Phylum: Chordata
- Class: Actinopterygii
- Order: Gobiiformes
- Family: Gobiidae
- Genus: Psammogobius
- Species: P. pisinnus

Binomial name
- Psammogobius pisinnus G. R. Allen, 2017

= Psammogobius pisinnus =

Species of fish

Psammogobius pisinnus, the sandslope goby, is a species of goby in the family Gobiidae from Australia and New Guinea.

== Description ==
Psammogobius pisinnus is a tiny pale species of goby, with a background colour of grey to whitish and marked with three broad brown blotches on its upper sides, the first blotch is the darkest and is located underneath first dorsal fin, the cheek and gill covers are mottled dark brown, and there a whitish stripe on the middle pectoral fin rays. The specific name refers to the very small size of the adults, they attain a total length of 2 centimetres (0.79 in).

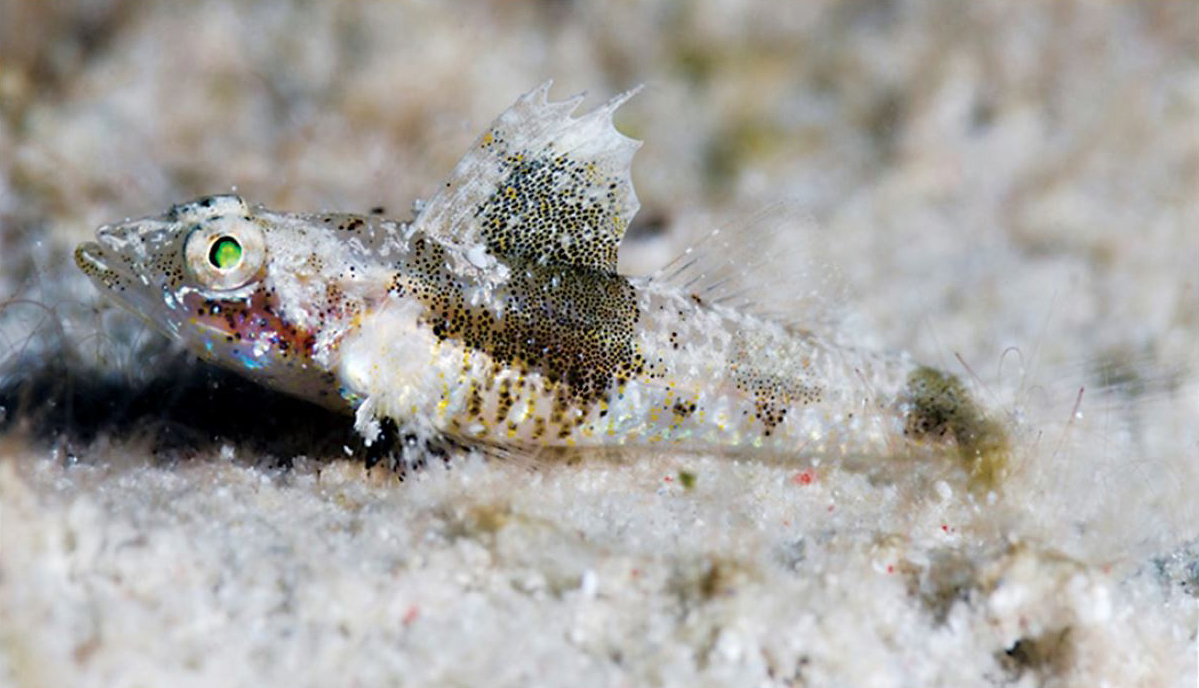
Psammogobius pisinnus Flynn Reef, Great Barrier Reef, Australia

== Distribution ==
Psammogobius psinnus is found around New Britain in Papua New Guinea with a single record from the northern Great Barrier Reef at Flynn Reef, Queensland.

== Habitat and biology ==
This species occurs on gentle reef slopes where there are patches of live coral mixed with sand-rubble at depths of about 10–20 metres (33–66 ft). It is a fully marine species, unlike its congeners. This goby was recorded either solitarily or in loose pairs. When approached individuals fully erected their first dorsal fin which was waved gently.
