= NTPC Haripad Floating Solar Power Plant =

Photovoltaic power station in Kayamkulam, India

- NTPC Haripad Floating Solar Power Plant
- Location of the NTPC Haripad Floating Solar Power Plant
- Country: India
- Location: Choolatheruvu, Haripad, Alappuzha district, Kerala.
- Coordinates: 9°14′20″N 76°25′49″E
- Status: Operational
- Commission date: Unit 1: 22 MW March 2022; Unit 2: 35 MW May 2022; Unit 3: 35 MW June 2022
- Operator: National Thermal Power Corporation

Power generation
- Nameplate capacity: 92 MW

NTPC Haripad Floating Solar Power Plant is a floating photovoltaic power station in Haripad, India.

== History ==
The 92 MW floating solar power plant is constructed upon a number of reservoirs owned by the National Thermal Power Corporation's Rajiv Gandhi Combined Cycle Power Plant. The last phase of the plant went online in July 2022. The plant supplies power to the Kerala State Electricity Board, utilizing the 22 0kV GIS substation.

The implementation of the project costs ₹465 crore (US$48 million). About 2.16 lakh solar panels will be installed on floaters. There was a delay in completing the project, which was initially planned to be operational in 2021. The delay occurred due to issues in importing solar cells from China, causing a setback in the project timeline. The contractors involved are Tata Power Solar for 70 MW and Bharat Heavy Electricals Ltd for 22 MW.
