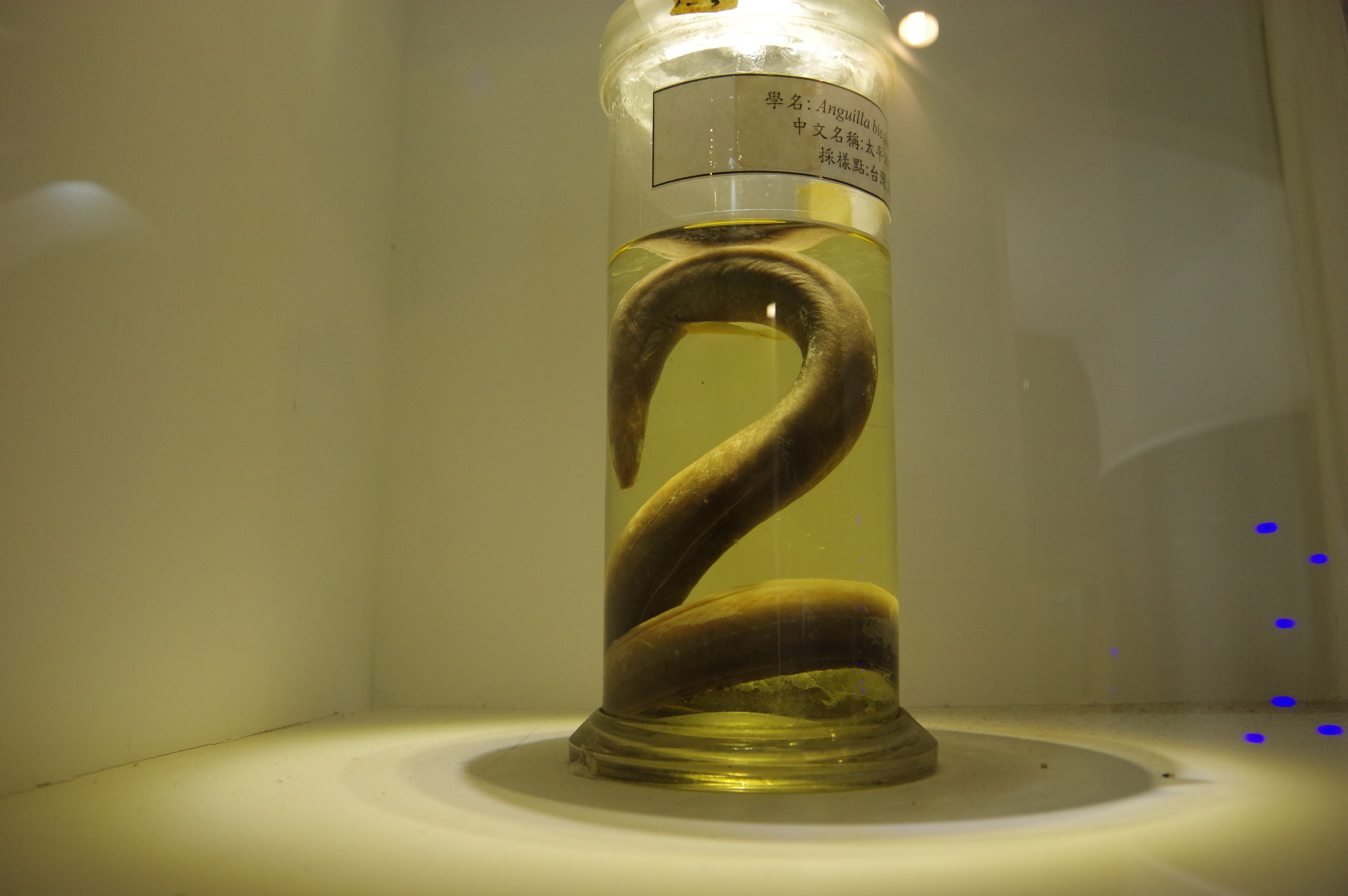
- Anguilla bicolor pacifica

Conservation status
- Near Threatened (IUCN 3.1)

Scientific classification
- Kingdom: Animalia
- Phylum: Chordata
- Class: Actinopterygii
- Order: Anguilliformes
- Family: Anguillidae
- Genus: Anguilla
- Species: A. bicolor

Binomial name
- Anguilla bicolor McClelland, 1844

Subspecies
- A. b. bicolor A. b. pacifica
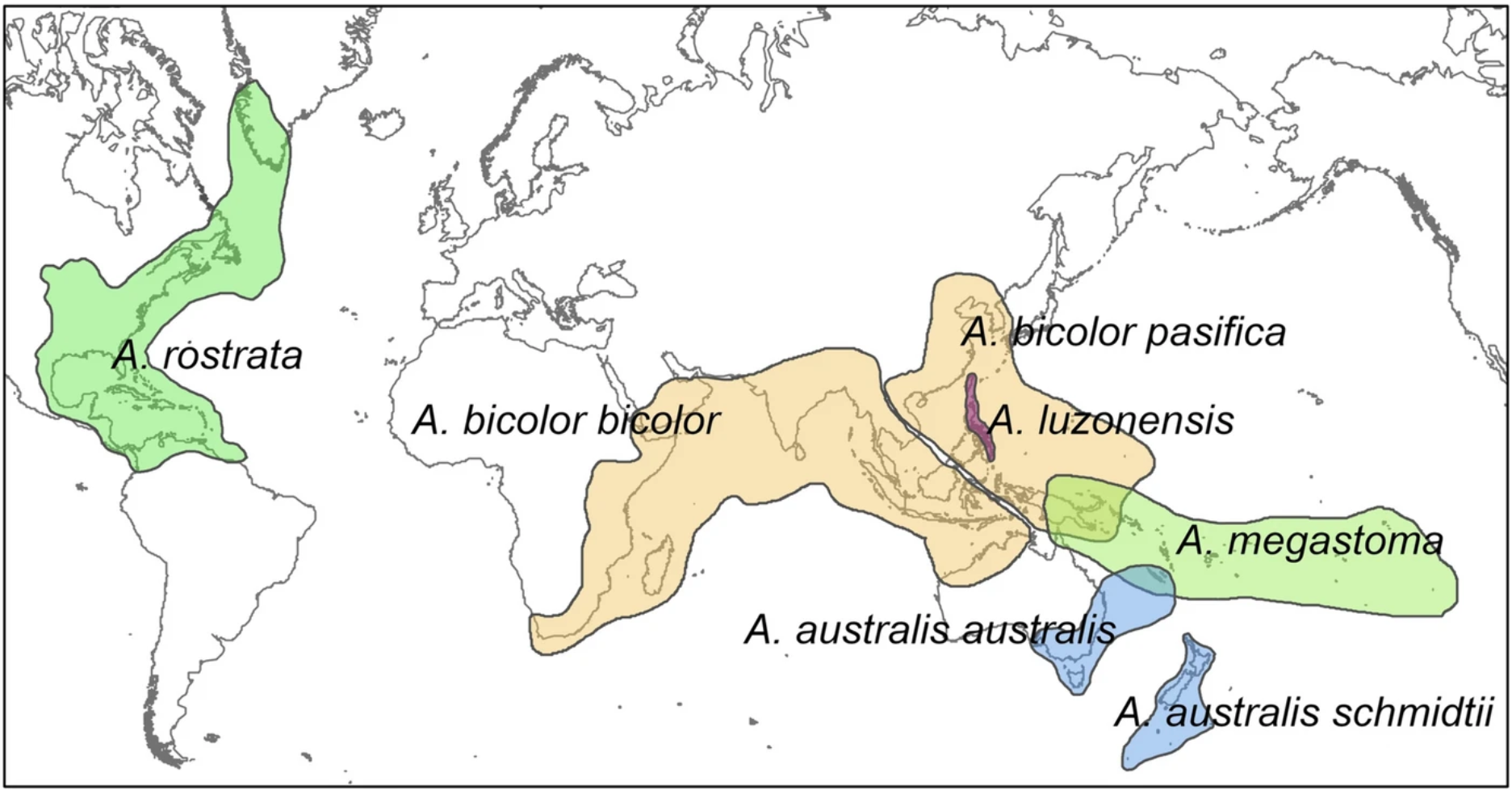
- Species distribution (orange)

Synonyms
- Anguilla amblodon Günther, 1867; Anguilla bleekeri Kaup, 1856; Anguilla cantori Kaup, 1856; Anguilla dussumieri Kaup, 1856; Anguilla foochowensis Chu & Yin, 1984; Anguilla malabarica Kaup, 1856; Anguilla moa Bleeker, 1849; Anguilla mowa Bleeker, 1853; Anguilla sidat Bleeker, 1853; Anguilla spengeli Weber, 1912; Muraena halmaherensis Bleeker, 1856; Muraena virescens Peters, 1852

= Anguilla bicolor =

Species of fish

Anguilla bicolor is a species of eel in the genus Anguilla of the family Anguillidae, consisting of two subspecies.

== Subspecies ==
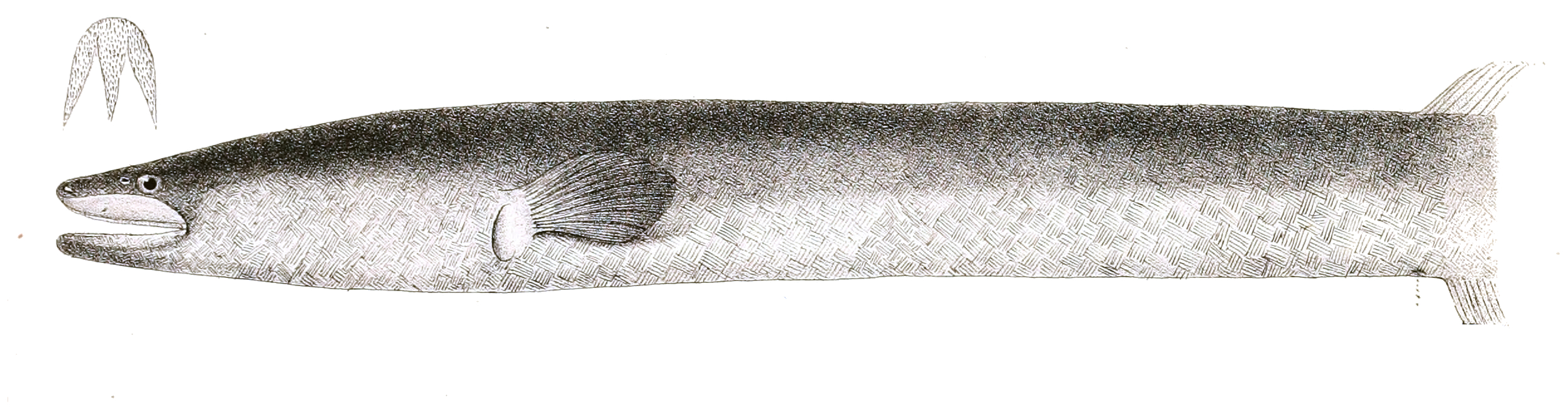

- Anguilla bicolor bicolor sometimes known as the Indonesian shortfin eel.
- Anguilla bicolor pacifica sometimes known as the Indian shortfin eel.
