= Valiyazheekkal Bridge =

Bridge in Kerala, India

Azheekkal Bridge അഴീക്കൽ പാലം
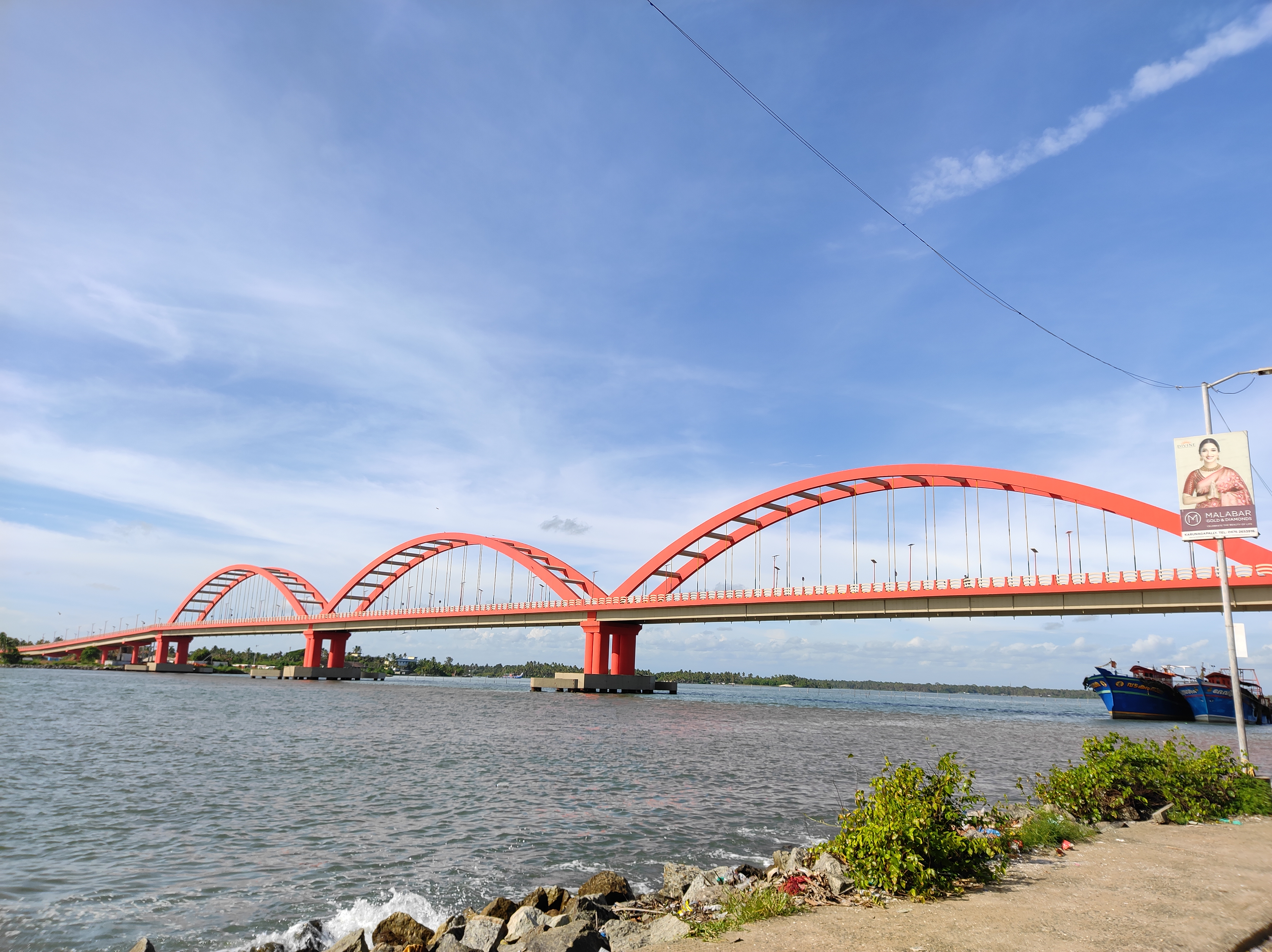
- A view of Valiyazheekkal / Azheekal Bridge from the harbor
- Coordinates: 9°08′13″N 76°27′54″E
- Carries: Coastal Highway (in future)
- Locale: Valiazheekkal and Azheekkal, Kayamkulam, Alappuzha, Azheekal Alappad kerala

Characteristics
- Material: Concrete steel bar
- Total length: 1200 meter
- Width: 13.2 meter
- Height: 36 meter
- No. of spans: 29

History
- Designer: P. K. Aravindan
- Constructed by: Uralungal Labor Contract Society
- Construction start: 2016
- Construction cost: ₹146.5 crores
- Inaugurated: 11 March 2022

Location
- Interactive map of Azheekkal Bridge

The Valiyazheekkal Bridge connecting between Valiyazheekkal, a coastal area of Aratupuzha village in Kayamkulam in Alappuzha district and Azheekal Beach in Alappad village of Kollam district in Kerala, India. Built across the mouth of the Arabian Sea, it is the longest tension steel bar concrete bowstring bridge in Asia. It is also the second longest bowstring bridge in Asia, after Chaotianmen Bridge in China. Valiyazheekkal is situated on the shore of Kayamkulam Town.

== Overview ==
Valiyazheekkal/Azheekal Bridge is the longest concrete arch span bridge in South India in terms of single span length. Out of a total of 29 spans, the middle three spans over the estuary are 110 meters each. This position was previously held by the 97.552 meter long Godavari bridge. Although larger bowstring spans have been built in China, they are all made of steel or concrete-filled steel tube (CFST) and span the river. Considering that it is constructed of tension steel bar concrete and is located in the sea (estuary), Valiyazheekkal Bridge has been touted as first of its kind. The spans are 12 meters high to accommodate large boats. Due to the fact that many boats, including large ones, have to come and go to the fishing harbors in the lake at the same time, the bridge is built at such a height on the pillars at such a distance. The height of the upper portion is 15 meters from the water including the thickness of the slab. The arch are at a height of 21 m. The total height of the bridge is 36 meters. The spans are attached to the tension rods of the McAlloy Company in England. The bridge has been given International orange and cream color, which is the color of the famous Golden Gate Bridge in San Francisco.

P. K. Aravindan, a renowned IIT Madras professor in the field of design, is the designer of the bridge. This bridge was his last design after he died. Its construction was started in 2016 and built by Uralungal Labor Contract Society. It was inaugurated on 11 March 2022. The total estimated cost of the project is 146.5 crores. After the construction of Valiyazheekkal Bridge, the distance between Valiyazheekkal and Aratupuzha was reduced by 28 km. The bridge is also a part of the proposed Coastal Highway.

The bridge is parallel to the sea and the Kayamkulam backwater. A walkway of 2.2 meters each is provided on the three spans in the middle of the bridge and on both sides to get a view from the bridge. The total width of the bridge, including the crash barrier and hand rails between the footpath and the road, is 13.2 meters. The rest of the pavement is 1.6 meters. The total length of the bridge including the approach road is 1.6 km.

With sea on one side, in consideration of the possibility of the port coming in the future, the approval of the port department was obtained following the rule of 100 meters distance between two pillars and 12 meters height from the water level. COVID-19 and Ockhi cyclone have created challenges, but construction work did not come to a standstill. During the floods of 2018 and 2019, the work was continued by finding temporary systems. The construction was completed after overcoming both sea storms and labor disputes.
