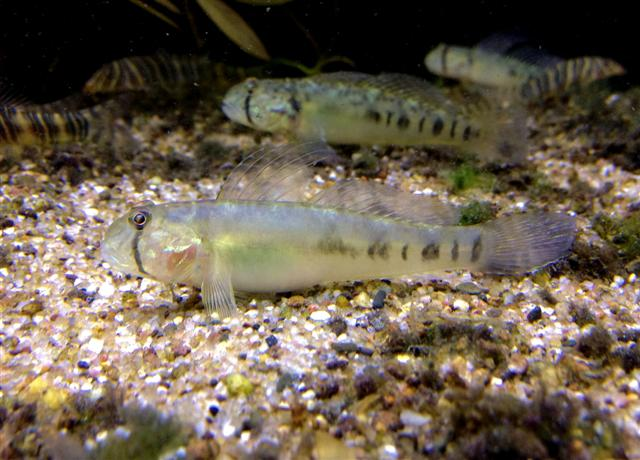

Conservation status
- Least Concern (IUCN 3.1)

Scientific classification
- Kingdom: Animalia
- Phylum: Chordata
- Class: Actinopterygii
- Order: Gobiiformes
- Family: Oxudercidae
- Genus: Oligolepis
- Species: O. acutipennis

Binomial name
- Oligolepis acutipennis (Valenciennes, 1837)

Synonyms
- Ctenogobius acutipennis Valenciennes, 1837; Ctenogobius acutipinnis Valenciennes, 1837; Gobius acutipennis Valenciennes, 1837; Gobius melanostigma Bleeker, 1849; Gobius setosus Valenciennes, 1837; Oligolepis acutipinnis (Valenciennes, 1837) [orth. error]

= Oligolepis acutipennis =

Species of fish

Oligolepis acutipennis, the sharptail goby, is a species of goby native to marine, freshwater and brackish waters along the coasts of Indo-West Pacific region. This species can reach a length of 12 centimetres (4.7 in) TL.

Mostly inhabit in muddy estuaries and coastal bays around marine and brackish water, enters freshwater systems.

== Distribution ==
The true distribution is unknown. But, may found in Indo-West Pacific regional countries such as India, Indonesia, Japan, Kenya, Madagascar, Palau, Solomon Islands, South Africa and perhaps in Sri Lanka.

== Sources ==
- https://www.researchgate.net/publication/230139422_Maturation_and_spawning_of_a_gobiid_fish_Oligolepis_acutipennis_(Cuv.__Val.)_from_the_southwest_coast_of_India
- http://www.practicalfishkeeping.co.uk/content.php?sid=3143
