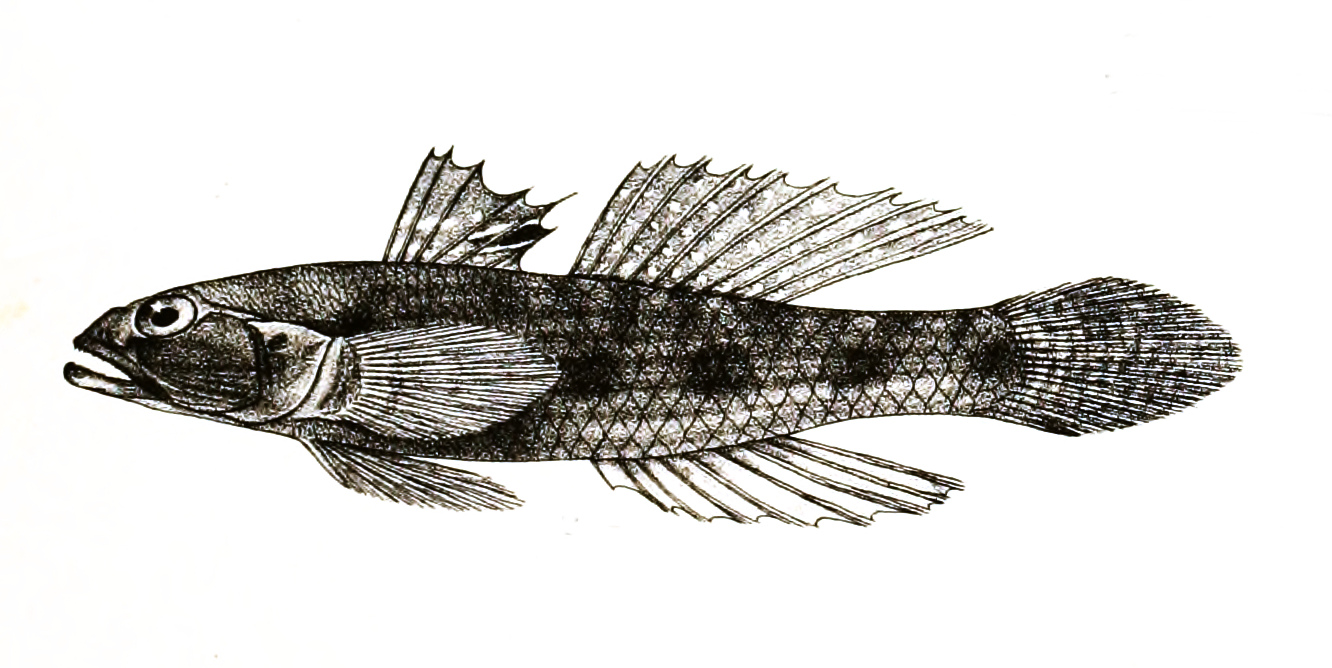

Conservation status
- Least Concern (IUCN 3.1)

Scientific classification
- Kingdom: Animalia
- Phylum: Chordata
- Class: Actinopterygii
- Division: Teleostei
- Order: Gobiiformes
- Family: Gobiidae
- Genus: Psammogobius
- Species: P. biocellatus

Binomial name
- Psammogobius biocellatus (Valenciennes, 1837)

Synonyms
- Gobius biocellatus Valenciennes, 1837; Glossogobius biocellatus (Valenciennes, 1837); Gobius sumatranus Bleeker, 1854

= Sleepy goby =

Species of fish

The sleepy goby (Psammogobius biocellatus) is a species of fish in the family Gobiidae.

== Description ==
Psammogobius biocellatus is a goby which varies in colour from dark brown to blackish, marked with rows of small black spots along its flanks and 2-3 dark blotches along the back and upper flanks. There is a dark band on the first dorsal fin with more dark bands on the lower part of the caudal fin and narrow bands on the pelvic fins. It attains a maximum total length of 12 centimetres (4.7 in).

== Distribution ==
Psammogobius biocellatus is a widespread species and is distributed East Africa and through the Western Indian Ocean and the Pacific as far east as Fiji and Samoa, north to Japan and south to Australia.

== Habitat and biology ==
The sleepy goby occurs in the intertidal zone in estuaries, lagoons and coastal rivers, often amongst mangroves where it burrowing into the silty-sand substrate, it may also be found in the lower reaches of freshwater streams. It buries itself in the sand.
