= Neendakara Port =

Neendakara port (Neendakara Fishing Harbour) is an intermediate port located in the Kollam district of Kerala. It is situated on the Ashtamudi Lake, which comprises both sides - Neendakara and Sakthikulangara. The port is used for fishing and cargo transportation. It has the capacity to contain over 500 fishing boats at a time.

The history of Neendakara port dates back to the early 16th century, when Portuguese traders settled in Kollam. Their ships passed through the Neendakara bar, which is now the site of the Neendakara Bridge. The bridge is part of National Highway 66, which connects the village of Neendakara to Sakthikulangara across the Ashtamudi Lake.

The name "Neendakara" means "a long bank" in Malayalam. The port is also known as the "Norwegian Project" because the headquarters of the Indo-Norwegian Fisheries Community project was based in Neendakara until 1961. The port has a natural depth of 12 feet and has a fish landing center that handles over 100,000 tonnes of fish per year.

== Features ==
Type of Harbour	Estuary
Location	8°56′12″N 76°32′14″E
Nearest Town	Kollam
Road access	1 km from NH 47
Sanctioned date and amount	No.33013-16/85 - Fy(H) dt.15.01.1992 of Rs.622 lakhs
Area of harbour basin	Neendakara - 5.50 Hector, 1.43 hector
Length of break water (1)	680.0m
Length of break water (2)	380.0m
Land area available	Neendakara - 8.5125 hectares (Including Puramboke land and harbour basin); Sakthikulangara - 4.94 hectares
Quay length (M)	Neendakara - 425m Sakthikulangara - 407 m
Auction hall (M2)	Neendakara - 6270 m2, Sakthikulangara - 582m2
Parking area in (M2)	Neendakara - 9500 M2; Sakthikulangara - 4500 m2
Internal road in (M)	Neendakara - 560 m (Way In & Way Out); Sakthikulangara - 250m.
Other facilities available	Neendakara Side Loading area, Locker room, Drains, Wharf, Packing shed, Rest shed, Canteen, Petty shops, Temporary shed for fish selling, Electrical room, Security room, Wharfage counter, Women shelter, Ice seller's room, Hygienic improvement facilities, Water supply; Sakthikulangara Side: Toilet Block, Ice plant, Locker Rooms, Shops,
