= Kayamkulam Kayal =

Back water in allepey

- Kayamkulam Lake; Kayamkulam Estuary
- കായംകുളം കായൽ (Malayalam)
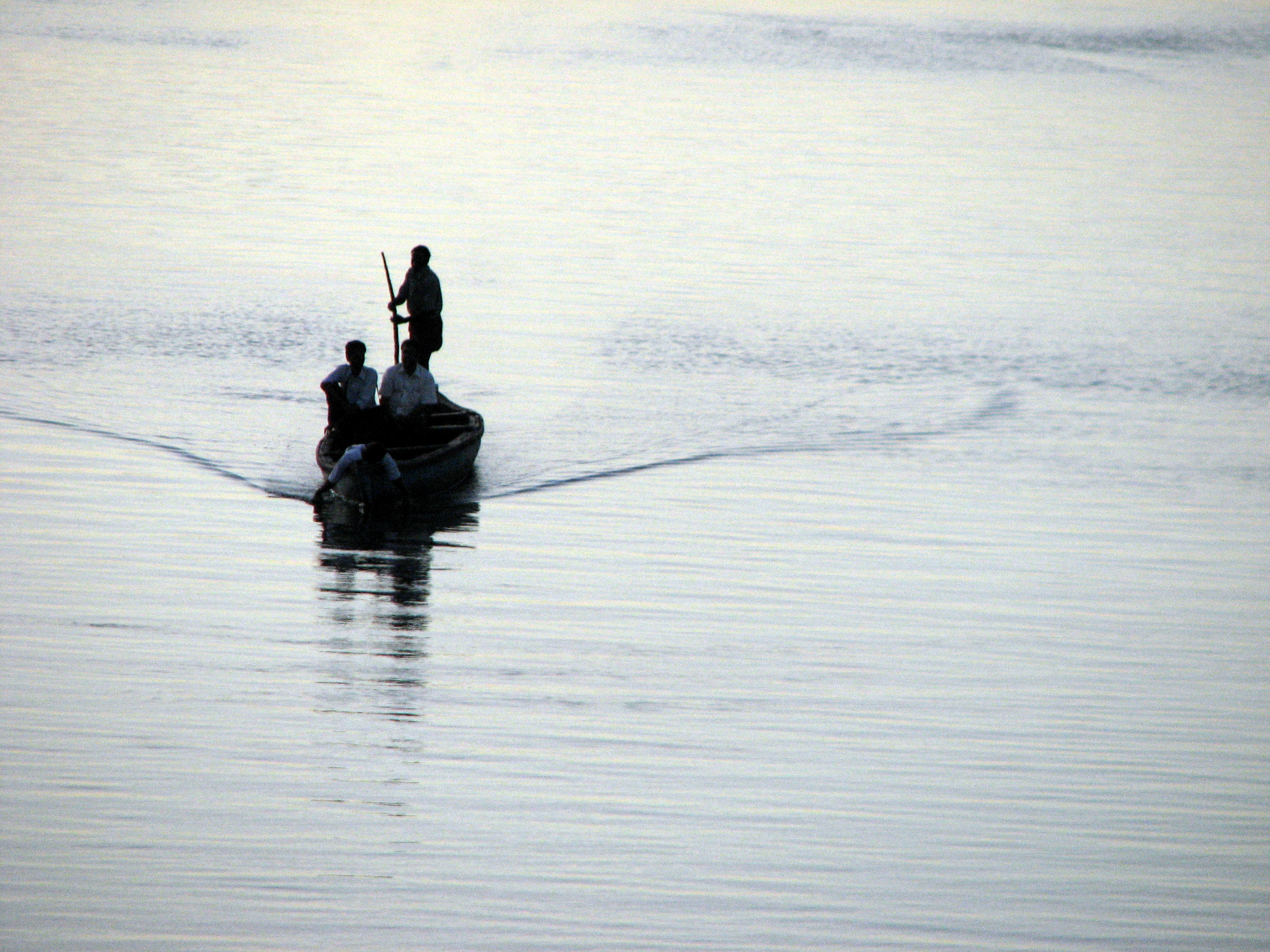
- View of Kayamkulam lake

- Location within Kerala
- Coordinates: 9°10′N 76°28′E
- Primary inflows: Achankovil, Pamba through Canals
- Basin countries: India
- Max. length: 30.4 kilometres (18.9 mi)
- Max. width: 2.74 kilometres (1.70 mi)
- Surface area: 1,652.33 hectares (4,083.0 acres)
- Average depth: 1.77 metres (5 ft 10 in)
- Max. depth: 2.5 metres (8 ft 2 in)
- Surface elevation: less than 1 metre (3.3 ft)
- Settlements: Kayamkulam

Kayamkulam Kayal, Kayamkulam Lake or Kayamkulam Estuary is a shallow brackish water lagoon stretching between Panmana and Karthikapally. It has an outlet to the Arabian sea at Kayamkulam barrage. The Kayal used to be connected to the sea most of the time except during dry season when a bar like formation separates it from the sea. Now the bar has been opened up permanently for construction of Kayamkulam Fishing Harbor. Kayamkulam boat race is conducted in Kayamkulam Kayal. Kayamkulam Kayal is the third largest back water or kayal in Kerala.

== History ==
There is a popular belief that Kayamkulam kayal was once lush green fields and Kayamkulam Raja, angry and desolate from being defeated by Travancore King Marthanda Varma, ordered his naval officers, Arattupuzha Arayars, to rupture the barrier separating it from the sea and let salt water in to make the fields un-cultivable. It is believed that when Kayamkulam was annexed the King threw all the valuables in his palace into Kayamkulam lake and fled the Kingdom.

In Aithihyamala it is mentioned that Kayamkulam Kochunni sunk his mother-in-law, after killing her, in Kayamkulam Lake.

== Geography ==
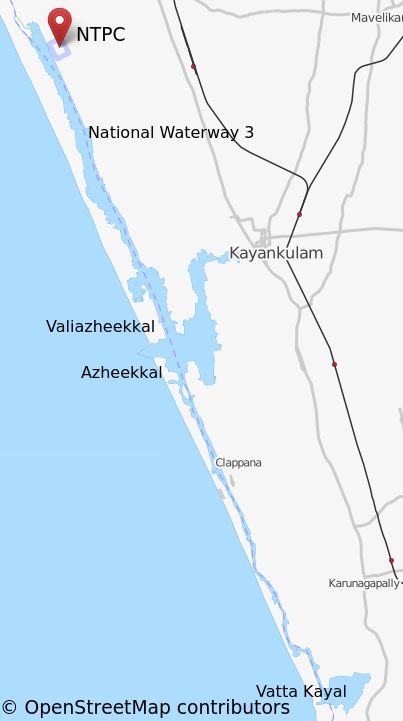
Map of Kayamkulam Kayal

Kayamkulam Kayal lies between latitudes 9°2'N and 9°16'N and longitudes 76°25'E and 76°32'E. The backwater occupies area in both Alappuzha district and Kollam of the total 1,652.33 hectares (4,083.0 acres), 140.58 hectares (347.4 acres) is in Kollam district and the rest 1,511.75 hectares (3,735.6 acres) in Alappuzha district. The Kayal has high length to width ratio and is almost a linear water body. It fall within the Survey of India(501) topographic sheets 58C/8 and 58C/12. The Kayal is connected to Vembanad Kayal in the north and Ashtamudi Kayal in the south.

== Meteorology and climate ==
The Kayal area has wet and maritime tropical climate influenced by the seasonal heavy rains. It receives more than 2000 mm of rain annually more than 70% of which come from the southwest summer monsoon(ഇടവപ്പാതി) and the rest from northeast winter monsoon (തുലാവർഷം). Annual mean temperature minimum and maximum are around 25 °C (77 °F) and 30 °C (86 °F). Humidity is higher in mornings than in afternoons.

The Kayal used to be connected to the sea most of the time but during dry season the sediments from the inflows separate the Kayal from the sea by forming a bar like formation and during the rainy season the bar is cut open by rivers and the Kayal was connected to the sea. Now the bar has been opened up permanently for construction of Kayamkulam Fishing Harbor.

== Water quality ==
Quality of water in the Kayal is highly dependent on the season as it is connected to both sea and fresh water rivers. The salinity of the water is highly season dependent and it also exhibits a gradient. In monsoon season salinity is 11% while in dry season it 30% almost that of a marine system. Presence of heavy metals is quite low and there is marked decrease in monsoon season due to heavy inflow. Levels of toxic material is below detectable limit. These estimations were done before setting up of Rajiv Gandhi CCPP on the banks of the Kayal. A study after setting up of the power plant reported that the temperature of cooling effluents were perceptibly higher than the lake water and the dissolved oxygen contend also fell near the plant site.

The water was studied by Central Inland Fisheries Research Institute after NTPC was set up. Recorded pH values vary from 6.75 (May 2000) to 8.3 (April 2002). Mean water temperature is 29.5 °C (85.1 °F)(2002). Biochemical oxygen demand (BOD5) values, Chemical oxygen demand(COD) values and nutrient content were high, these were attributed to NTPC effluent discharge and retting of coconut husks.

== Algae ==
The shallow warm waters of the Kayal is abundant in vegetation and planktons. The distribution of algae is climate dependent showing marked variations. A 2001-02 study reported the presence of forty-one genus of algae seven genus of Myxophyceae, Twenty one genus of Chlorophyceae, five genus of Desmidiaceae and eight genus of Bacillariophyceae. It also report the presence of fifteen zooplanktons which includes four genus of protozoa, eight genus of Rotifera and three genus of Copepoda. A 2012 study reports the presence of ten genus of Chlorophyceae. This study also remark on the seasonal variation of algae population and reports that Chlorophyceae population peaks in post monsoon. The deeper part of the lake is poor in vegetation except for encrustation by blue green algae Oscillatoria. A 1975 study reported the presence sixteen genus of foraminiferans.

== Sediments ==
Percentage of sand, silt and clay varies widely with location and season with more percentage of sand in post monsoon season than in pre-monsoon. Silt and clay contents are higher in pre-monsoon. Sand grains fall mainly under the medium to very fine sand grade of Wentworth grain size scale. The northern part is silty or clayey centre mostly sandy and southern part mostly muddy but with great variations in between.

Environment Impact Assessment before setting up Rajiv Gandhi CCP in Kayamkulam noted that concentration of mercury and nickel in the sediments is much lower than the crust rocks. Distribution of copper is inconsistent and varies spatially. Concentration of lead is marginally high but they are generally associated with chelates and other organic matter and are fixed in the sediment matrix and are not leachable. Sediment is high in iron content possiblily because weathering of charnockite and pagmetite rocks.

== Aquafauna ==
A 1955 study by Mary John identified fifteen species of grey mullets. She reports that most species of grey millets migrate to the lake during the months when Kayal is connected to the sea. The Kayal is rich in prawns. An environment impact assessment by National Thermal Power Corporation in association with the Fisheries department lists about 70 species of fishes in the Kayal. There are about 40 commercially important fish species which includes flathead mullet, greenback mullet, longarm mullet, largescale mullet, gold-spot mullet, bluespot mullet, tade grey mullet, bluetail mullet, Commerson's glassy perchlet, bald glassy perchlet, greasy grouper, tiger perch, spotted catfish, milkfish, longfin snake-eel, largetooth flounder, Solea indica, roughscale tonguesole, speckled tonguesole, barracuda, pearlspot, orange chromide, sulphur goatfish, spotted scat, whipfin silver-biddy, slender silver-biddy, small Bengal silver-biddy, common ponyfish, splendid ponyfish, shortnose ponyfish, Indo-Pacific tarpon, tenpounder, fringescale sardinella, Indian anchovy, Commerson's anchovy, Malabar thryssa and walking catfish. Besides the commercially important species there are about 30 other species of fish including northern whiting, bigeye trevally, black-tailed trevally, congaturi halfbeak, long-billed halfbeak, Quoy's garfish, chacunda gizzard shad, milkspotted puffer, diodon, Indian halibut, chorinemus, dusky sleeper, tank goby, mangrove red snapper, dory snapper, sleepy goby, sharptail goby, spotfin snouted goby Indian short-finned eel, Macrognathus guentheri, long whiskers catfish, yellow catfish, striped dwarf catfish, scarlet-banded barb, greenstripe barb, climbing perch, Indian carplet and spotted snakehead.

There are about fifteen species of prawn in the Kayal of which eleven are commercially important. Commercially important species include giant tiger prawn, Indian prawn, green tiger prawn, Metapenaeus dobsoni, speckled shrimp, Jinga shrimp, giant freshwater prawn, Macrobrachium idae, Macrobrachium Spence, Macrobrachium idella, Macrobrachium scabriculum and other species include Caridina nilotica, orange shrimp, Metapenaeus brevicornis and Macrobrachium equidens.

The Kayal is also home to crab species Scylla serrata and Portunus pelagicus.

=== Inland fishing ===
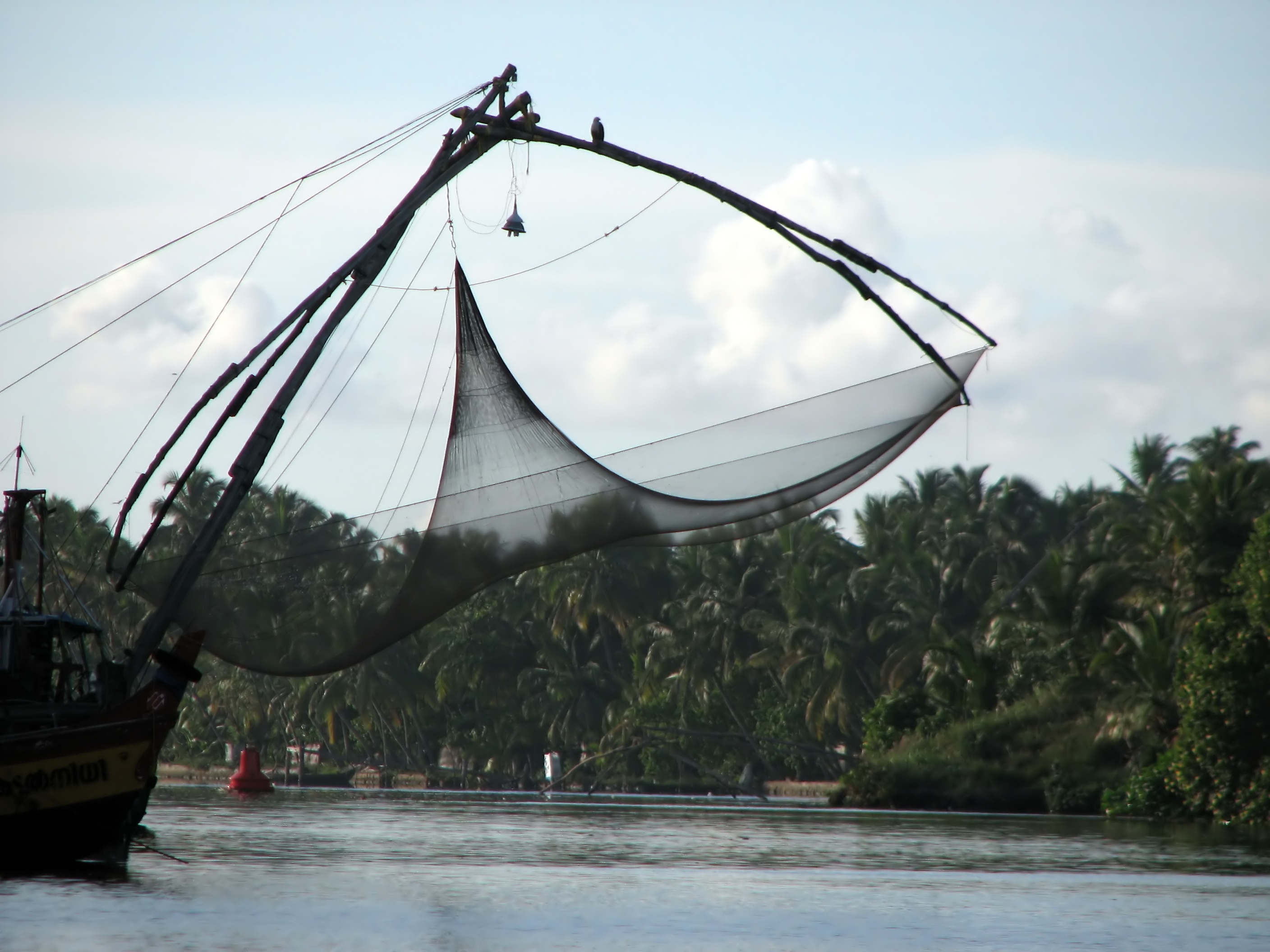
Fishing Net

The Kayal directly serves as the means of livelihood of thousands of fishermen. The chief catch is grey millets and prawns. The main fishing season is from October to January during the season the Kayal will be connected to the sea. The majority of fish are caught using any one of cast net, gill net, scare net, seine net, dip net, ring net, scoope net or trap. Arattupuzha, a fishing village on the bank of Kayamkulam Kayal, is famous for chakara mud formation resulting from thronging of large amount of fish and prawns.

== Avifauna ==
The environment impact assessment survey conducted by NTPC, reports the presence of 27 species of birds that fall into 25 different genera. These birds include common myna, common kingfisher, Malabar pied hornbill, snakebird, cattle egret, little ringed plover, Indian roller, house crow, jungle crow, jungle fowl, fork-tailed drongo, black-rumped flameback, little egret, Asian koel, common moorhen, black-capped kingfisher, house sparrow, black kite, white-throated kingfisher, yellow-throated sparrow, stork-billed kingfisher, baya weaver, red-vented bulbul, greater painted-snipe, black-headed ibis, common babbler and hoopoe.

== Benthic fauna ==
Environment Impact Assessment Survey conducted by NTPC, recorded the presence Amphipoda, Bivalvia, Gastropoda, Gastrotricha, Isopoda, Nemertea(ribbon worm), Oligochaeta, Polychaetes, Sipuncula(peanut worm) and Tanaidacea in the lake bed. Kayal is home to molluscs, two mussel species Asian green mussel and brown mussel, oyster species Crassostrea bilineata and clams of genus Meretrix and black clam are found in Kayamkulam Kayal.

== Alappuzha Mega Tourism Project ==
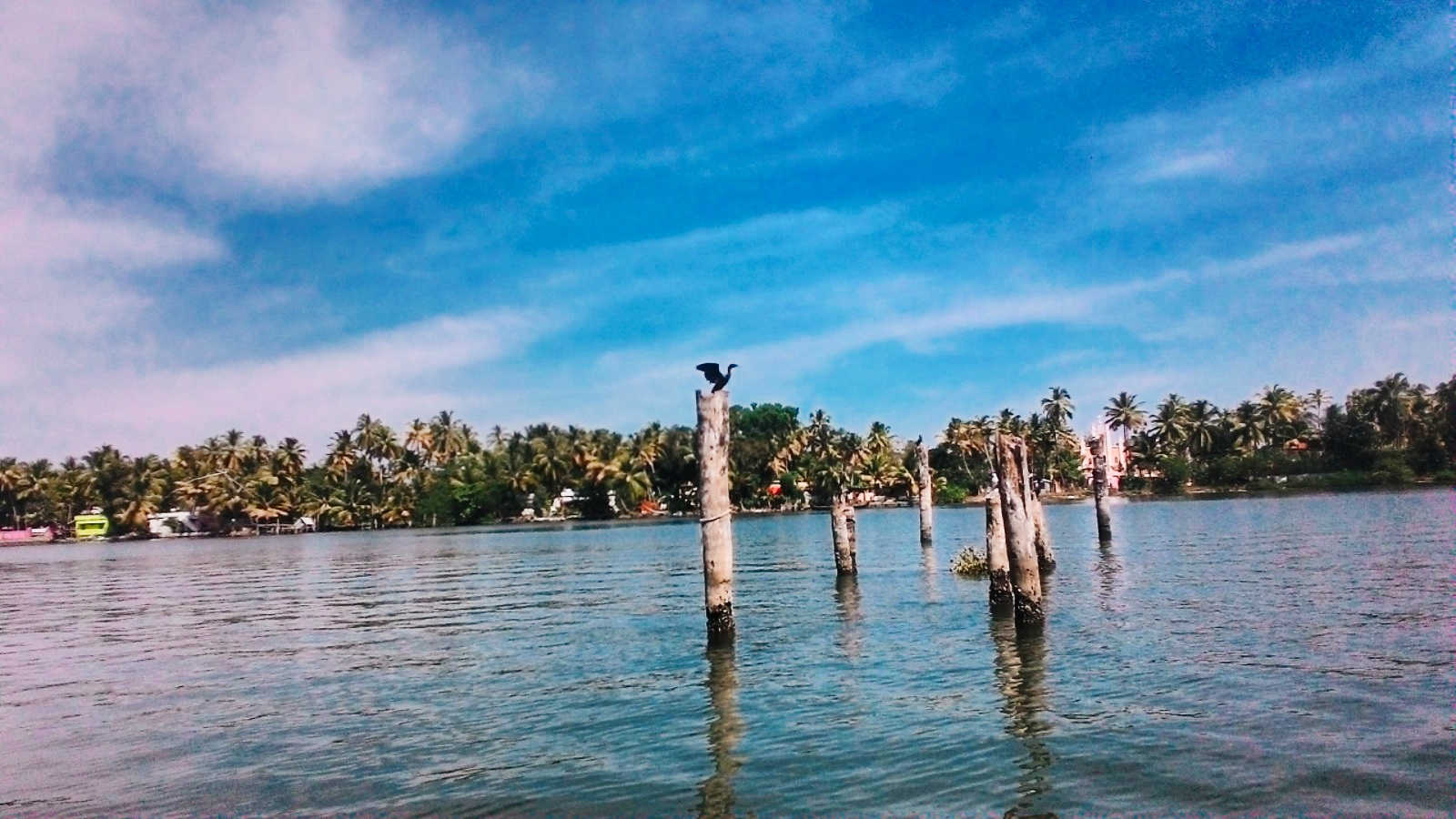
At Clappana

Kayamkulam Kayal area is one of the benefactors of Alappuzha Mega Tourism Project announced by the President of India, when he was visiting Alappuzha to witness the Nehru Trophy Boat Race. Tourism project that aims to exploit the tourism potential of Kayamkulam and nearby area aims build waterway connecting Kayamkulam Lake and National Waterway, Water sports complex, Seasting Gallery, Tsunami Memorial, Museum, Cycling Track, floating restaurant, Recreation Zone, Adventure zone and House boat terminal with Amenities like Tourist arrival centre, Tourist inter protection centre, Boardwalk and view point, Landscaping, Yard lighting, Houseboat Jetty and waterway for boats. There are also allegations of misuse of the money.

== Rajiv Gandhi CCPP Kayamkulam ==
Rajiv Gandhi Combined Cycle Power Plant Kayamkulam or NTPC Kayamkulam is on the bank of Kayamkulam Kayal. The majority of the plant site is reclaimed land from the Kayal which originally belonged to the Keral State Agricultural Department and was used for Grass Farming. The site was then acquired by NTPC. Kayal was drenched and the bed materials were used for leveling the plant site. Effluents and other waste from the plant, after processing, is discharged into the Kayamkulam Kayal.

== National Waterway 3 ==
National waterway 3 passes through Kayamkulam Kayal. Total length of waterway in the Kayal is approximately 25 kilometres (16 mi) and Least Available Depth is at least 1.5 metres (4 ft 11 in). Kayamkulam Kayal had been drenched for creation of the Waterway. There is an IWT terminal in Kayamkulam occupying an area of 1.6304 acres (0.6598 ha).

== Kayamkulam Boat Race ==
Kayamkulam boat race is held in Kayamkulam kayal. The race track is 1,200 metres (3,900 ft) in length 70 metres (230 ft) in width and 2 metres (6 ft 7 in) in depth. 2 Crore Rupees were spent for the restoration work. The inaugural boat race was conducted on 28 August 2010. Kayamkulam boat race as the brain child of MLA C.K. Sadashivan. The first boat race was inaugurated by the Chief Minister V.S. Achuthanandan. Snake boat race is the main event. Besides the main category other categories include Thekkenodi women's category, Veppu A grade category, Veppu B grade category and Churulan category and Iruttukutthi A grade category.

Sl. no.	Date	Winner	Reference
1	28 August 2010	Payipad Chundan	
2	27 August 2011	Sree Ganesh Chundan	
3	25 August 2012	Jawahar Thayankkari Chundan	
4	7 September 2013	Jawahar Thayankkari Chundan	

== 2004 tsunami ==
Kayamkulam Kayal and its shore were the most affected parts in Kerala. Here the tsunami coincided with high tide amplifying the damage. Cheriazhikkal a village to the north of Kayamkulam inlet on the shore of Kayamkulam lake had a water run up of 5 metres. Azhikkal on the southern side of Kayamkulam inlet had a water run up of 4.5 m. A Tsunami Memorial is built in Azhikkal for commemoration of the event.
