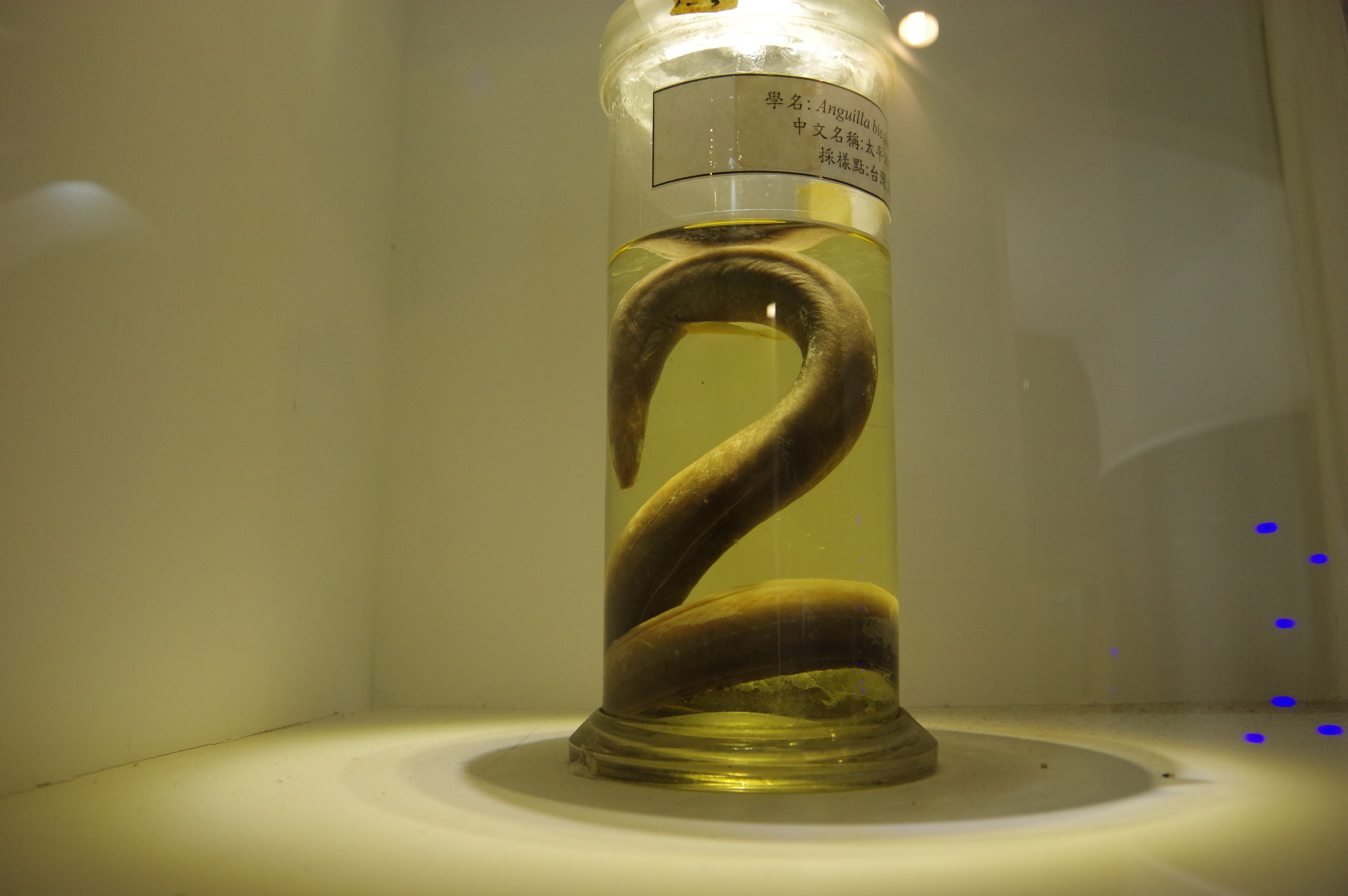

Scientific classification
- Kingdom: Animalia
- Phylum: Chordata
- Class: Actinopterygii
- Order: Anguilliformes
- Family: Anguillidae
- Genus: Anguilla
- Species: A. bicolor
- Subspecies: A. b. pacifica

Trinomial name
- Anguilla bicolor pacifica E. J. Schmidt, 1928

= Indian shortfin eel =

Subspecies of fish

The Indian shortfin eel, Anguilla bicolor pacifica, is a species of eel in the genus Anguilla of the family Anguillidae. The Indian shortfin eel typically lives in fresh water or brackish water. The habitat use of the Indian shortfin eel is dependent on environmental factors.
