= Alappad =

- Village
- Location in Kerala, India Alappad (India)
- Coordinates: 9°5′N 76°29′E
- Country: India
- State: Kerala
- District: Kollam
- Taluk: Karunagappalli

Languages
  - Official: Malayalam, English
- Time zone: UTC+5:30 (IST)
- PIN: 680641
- Vehicle registration: KL-23

Alappad is a coastal village in the Kollam district of the Indian state Kerala. It is situated on a narrow strip of land sandwiched between the Arabian Sea and the TS Canal – the village is approximately 16 km long and its narrowest point is as thin as 33 meters. Connect to the mainland is by bridge as well as by country boat ferries, operated by the Panchayat and private parties. Until recently there was only one bridge at the southern point of the land strip, but after the 2004 tsunami, two other bridges have been constructed. The protests are taking place in the village against Unscientific sand mining by IREL.

== Administration ==
Alappad village is a ward of the panchayat of the same name. Often, the whole panchayat is referred as Alappad; however, the panchayat actually consists of various wards/places such as Srayikkadu, Azheekal, Kuzhithura, Parayakadavu, Cheriazheekkal, Pandarathuruthu Vellanathuruth

== 2004 tsunami ==
Portions of the village were damaged during the 2004 tsunami. Alappad was the worst-affected village in Kerala – several people lost their lives. After the tragedy, the state government realised need for more bridges, and constructed one bridge at northern Azheekal, and another one at Cheriyazhekkal

== Mineral sand mining ==
The public sector undertaking in Kollam, Kerala Minerals and Metals Limited (KMML) and Indian Rare Earths (IRE) started mineral sand mining in the Alappad. The local residents of Alappad started the strike against black sand mining by raising the slogan 'Save Alappad, Stop Mining'.

== Demographics – 2011 census data ==
Information	Figure	Remark
Population	21,655	
Males	10,689	
Females	10,966	
0–6 age group	1,999	9.23% of population
Female sex ratio	1026	state av=1084
literacy rate	95.52 %	state av=94.0
Male literacy	95.88 %	
Female literacy	95.18 %	
Scheduled Caste	361	
scheduled tribe	18	

The residents of Alappad are mostly Hindus. The village is home to many temples. Temples act as places of worship, and temple committees play a crucial role in temple administration and festivals which play important role in social life.

== Notable residents ==
Mata Amritanandamayi, renowned Hindu Sanyasin, spiritual leader and philanthropist was born in Parayakadavu. Mata Amritanandamayi Math is located in Parayakadavu.
