= Passenger pigeon =

Passenger pigeon Temporal range: 5.33–0 Ma Zanclean–Holocene
- Live female in 1898, kept in the aviary of C. O. Whitman

Conservation status
- Extinct (1914) (IUCN 3.1)

- Presumed Extinct (1914) (NatureServe)

Scientific classification
- Kingdom: Animalia
- Phylum: Chordata
- Class: Aves
- Order: Columbiformes
- Family: Columbidae
- Genus: †Ectopistes; Swainson, 1827
- Species: †E. migratorius

Binomial name
- †Ectopistes migratorius (Linnaeus, 1766)
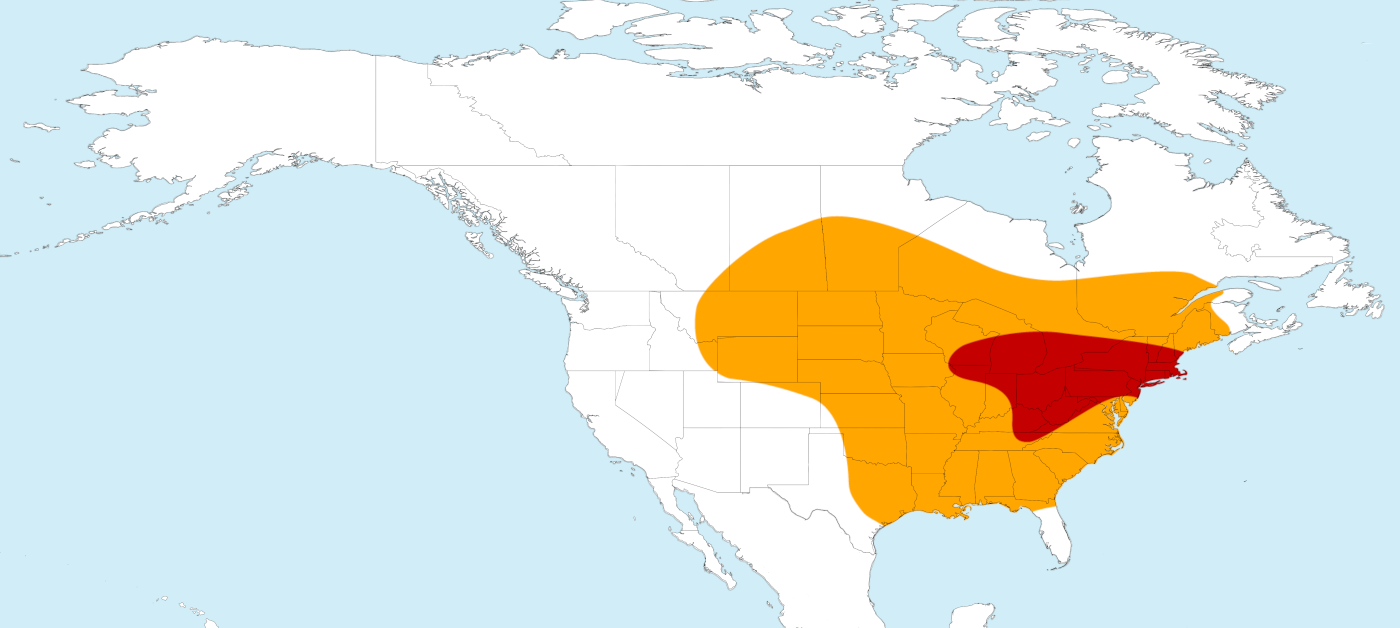
- Distribution map, with former range in orange and breeding zone in red

Synonyms
- Columba migratoria Linnaeus, 1766; Columba canadensis Linnaeus, 1766; Ectopistes migratoria Swainson, 1827; Columba macroura Edwards, 1743

Extinct North American migratory pigeon

The passenger pigeon or wild pigeon (Ectopistes migratorius) is an extinct species of pigeon that was endemic to North America. Its common name is derived from the French word passager, meaning "passing by", due to the migratory habits of the species. The scientific name also refers to its migratory characteristics. The morphologically similar mourning dove (Zenaida macroura) was long thought to be its closest relative, and the two were at times confused, but genetic analysis has shown that the genus Patagioenas is more closely related to it than the Zenaida doves.

The passenger pigeon was sexually dimorphic in size and coloration. The male was 390 to 410 mm (15.4 to 16.1 in) in length, mainly gray on the upperparts, lighter on the underparts, with iridescent bronze feathers on the neck, and black spots on the wings. The female was 380 to 400 mm (15.0 to 15.7 in), and was duller and browner than the male overall. The juvenile was similar to the female, but without iridescence. It mainly inhabited the deciduous forests of eastern North America and was also recorded elsewhere, but bred primarily around the Great Lakes. The pigeon migrated in enormous flocks, constantly searching for food, shelter, and breeding grounds, and was once the most abundant bird in North America, numbering around 3 billion, and possibly up to 5 billion. A very fast flyer, the passenger pigeon could reach a speed of 100 km/h (62 mph). The bird fed mainly on mast, and also fruits and invertebrates. It practiced communal roosting and communal breeding, and its extreme gregariousness may have been linked with searching for food and predator satiation.

Passenger pigeons were hunted by Native Americans, but hunting intensified after the arrival of Europeans, particularly in the 19th century. Pigeon meat was commercialized as cheap food, resulting in hunting on a massive scale for many decades. There were several other factors contributing to the decline and subsequent extinction of the species, including shrinking of the large breeding populations necessary for preservation of the species and widespread deforestation, which destroyed its habitat. A slow decline between about 1800 and 1870 was followed by a rapid decline between 1870 and 1890. A historical plaque in Indiana states that the last confirmed wild passenger pigeon was shot in Laurel in 1902. The last captive birds were divided in three groups around the turn of the 20th century, some of which were photographed alive. Martha, thought to be the last passenger pigeon, died on September 1, 1914, at the Cincinnati Zoo. The eradication of the species is a notable example of anthropogenic extinction.

== Taxonomy ==
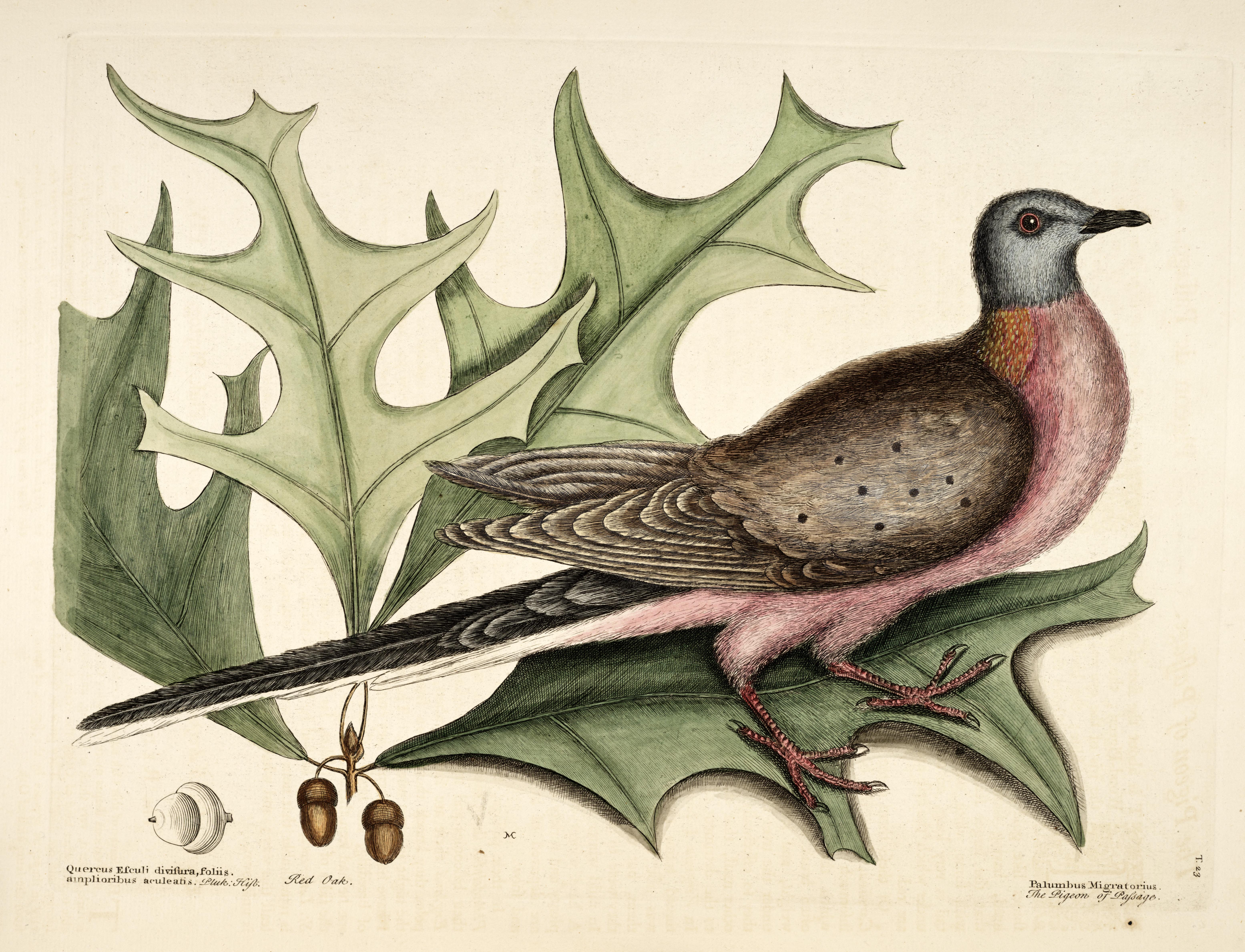
Earliest published illustration of the species (a male), Mark Catesby, 1731

Swedish naturalist Carl Linnaeus coined the binomial name Columba macroura for both the mourning dove and the passenger pigeon in the 1758 edition of his work Systema Naturae (the starting point of biological nomenclature), wherein he appears to have considered the two identical. This composite description cited accounts of these birds in two pre-Linnean books. One of these was Mark Catesby's description of the passenger pigeon, which was published in his 1731 to 1743 work Natural History of Carolina, Florida and the Bahama Islands, which referred to this bird as Palumbus migratorius, and was accompanied by the earliest published illustration of the species.

Catesby's description was combined with the 1743 description of the mourning dove by George Edwards, who used the name C. macroura for that bird. There is nothing to suggest Linnaeus ever saw specimens of these birds himself, and his description is thought to be fully derivative of these earlier accounts and their illustrations. In his 1766 edition of Systema Naturae, Linnaeus dropped the name C. macroura, and instead used the name C. migratoria for the passenger pigeon, and C. carolinensis for the mourning dove. In the same edition, Linnaeus also named C. canadensis, based on Turtur canadensis, as used by Mathurin Jacques Brisson in 1760. Brisson's description was later shown to have been based on a female passenger pigeon.

In 1827, William Swainson moved the passenger pigeon from the genus Columba to the new monotypic genus Ectopistes, due in part to the length of the wings and the wedge shape of the tail. In 1906 Outram Bangs suggested that because Linnaeus had wholly copied Catesby's text when coining C. macroura, this name should apply to the passenger pigeon, as E. macroura. In 1918 Harry C. Oberholser suggested that C. canadensis should take precedence over C. migratoria (as E. canadensis), as it appeared on an earlier page in Linnaeus' book. In 1952 Francis Hemming proposed that the International Commission on Zoological Nomenclature (ICZN) secure the specific name macroura for the mourning dove, and the name migratorius for the passenger pigeon, since this was the intended use by the authors on whose work Linnaeus had based his description. This was accepted by the ICZN, which used its plenary powers to designate the species for the respective names in 1955.

=== Evolution ===
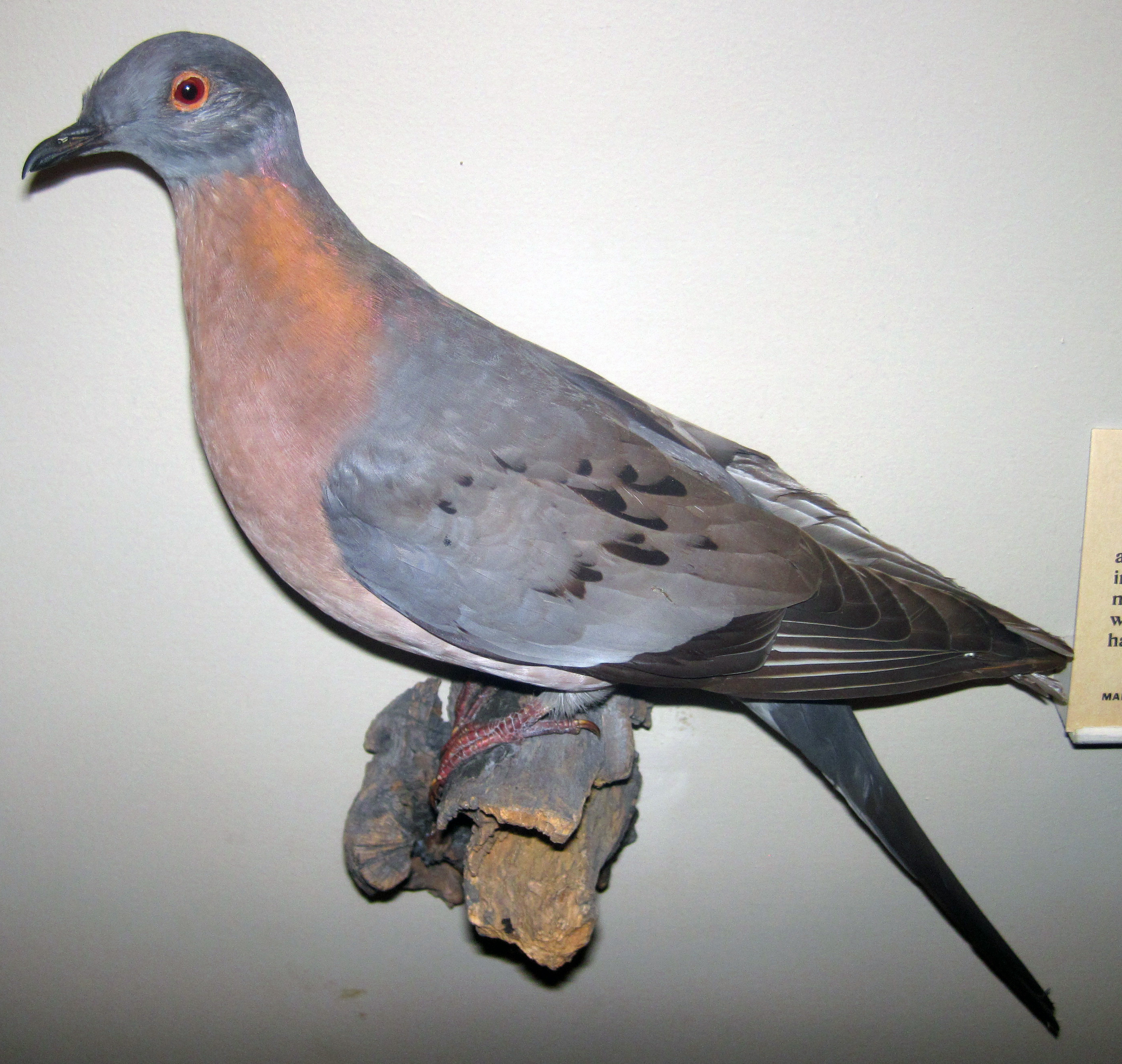
Mounted male passenger pigeon, Field Museum of Natural History

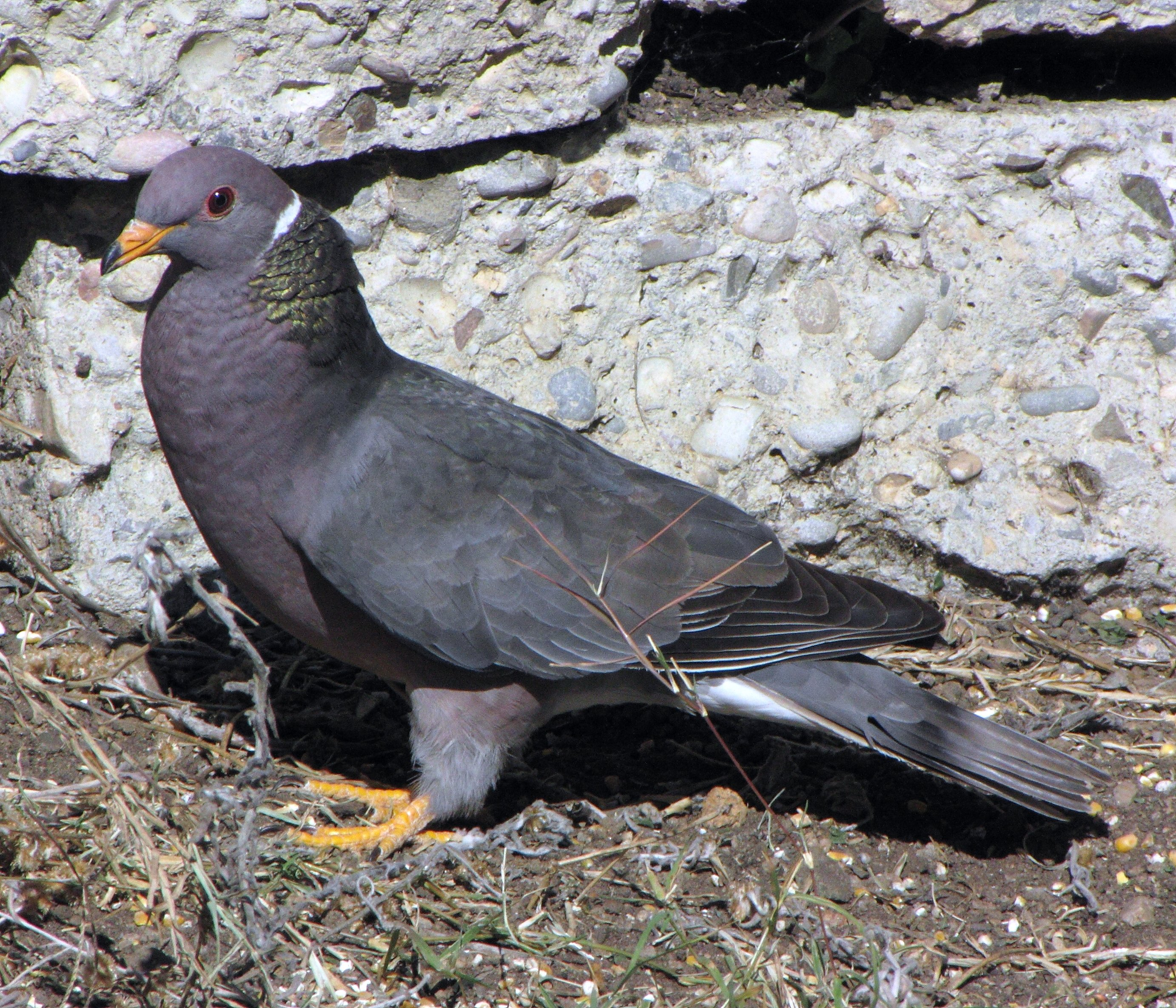
Band-tailed pigeon, a species in the related genus Patagioenas

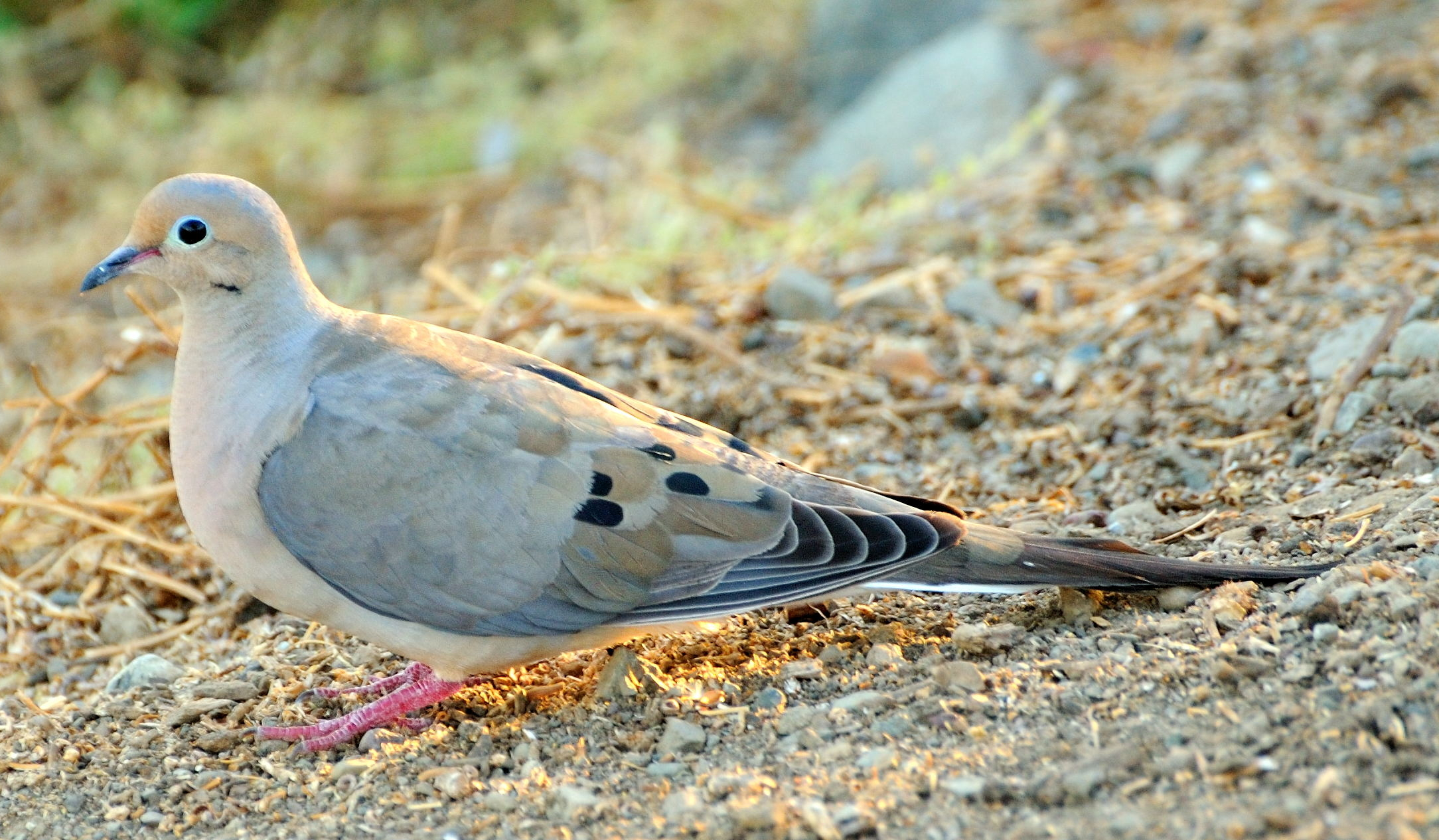
The physically similar mourning dove is not closely related.

The passenger pigeon was a member of the pigeon and dove family, Columbidae. The oldest known fossil of the genus is an isolated humerus (USNM 430960) known from the Lee Creek Mine in North Carolina in sediments belonging to the Yorktown Formation, dating to the Zanclean stage of the Pliocene, between 5.3 and 3.6 million years ago. Its closest living relatives were long thought to be the Zenaida doves, based on morphological grounds, particularly the physically similar mourning dove (now Z. macroura). It was even suggested that the mourning dove belonged to the genus Ectopistes and was listed as E. carolinensis by some authors, including Thomas Mayo Brewer. The passenger pigeon was supposedly descended from Zenaida pigeons that had adapted to the woodlands on the plains of central North America.

The passenger pigeon differed from the species in the genus Zenaida in being larger, lacking a facial stripe, being sexually dimorphic, and having iridescent neck feathers and a smaller clutch. In a 2002 study by American geneticist Beth Shapiro et al., museum specimens of the passenger pigeon were included in an ancient DNA analysis for the first time (in a paper focusing mainly on the dodo), and it was found to be the sister taxon of the cuckoo-dove genus Macropygia. The Zenaida doves were instead shown to be related to the quail-doves of the genus Geotrygon and the Leptotila doves.

A more extensive 2010 study instead showed that the passenger pigeon was most closely related to the New World Patagioenas pigeons, including the band-tailed pigeon (P. fasciata) of western North America, which are related to the Southeast Asian species in the genera Turacoena, Macropygia, and Reinwardtoena. This clade is also related to the Columba and Streptopelia doves of the Old World (collectively termed the "typical pigeons and doves"). The authors of the study suggested that the ancestors of the passenger pigeon may have colonized the New World from South East Asia by flying across the Pacific Ocean, or perhaps across Beringia in the north.

In a 2012 study, the nuclear DNA of the passenger pigeon was analyzed for the first time, and its relationship with the Patagioenas pigeon was confirmed. In contrast to the 2010 study, these authors suggested that their results could indicate that the ancestors of the passenger pigeon and its Old World relatives may have originated in the Neotropical region of the New World.

The cladogram below follows the 2012 DNA study showing the position of the passenger pigeon among its closest relatives:

- - - - - - Macropygia (cuckoo-doves)
          - Reinwardtoena
        - Turacoena
      - - Columba (Old World pigeons)
        - Streptopelia (turtle doves and collared doves)
    - - Patagioenas (New World pigeons)
      - Ectopistes (passenger pigeon)

DNA in old museum specimens is often degraded and fragmentary, and passenger pigeon specimens have been used in various studies to discover improved methods of analyzing and assembling genomes from such material. DNA samples are often taken from the toe pads of bird skins in museums, as this can be done without causing significant damage to valuable specimens. The passenger pigeon had no known subspecies. Hybridization occurred between the passenger pigeon and the Barbary dove (Streptopelia risoria) in the aviary of Charles Otis Whitman (who owned many of the last captive birds around the turn of the 20th century, and kept them with other pigeon species) but the offspring were infertile.

=== Etymology ===
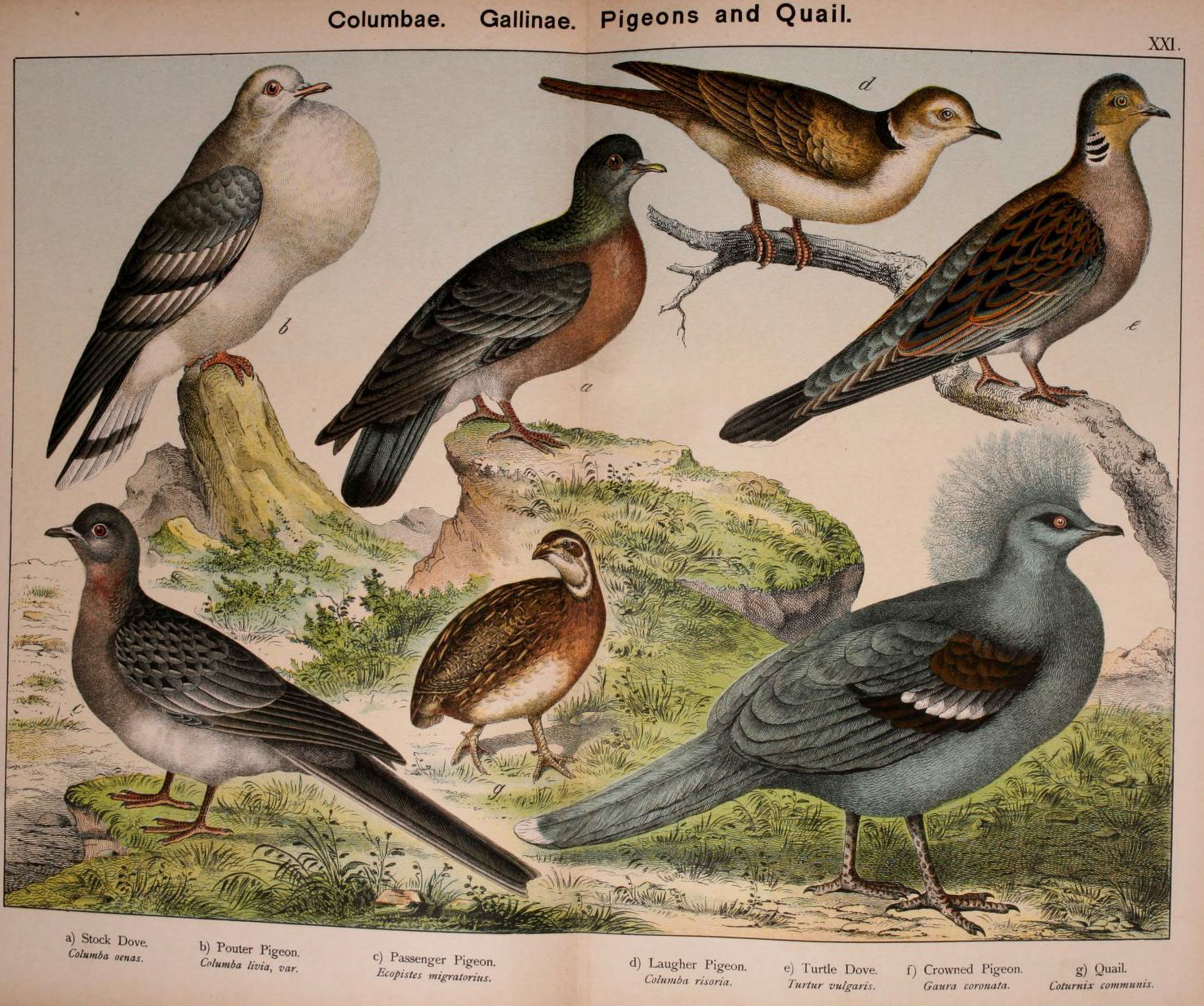
Illustration of pigeon species from a 1889 zoology book, including the passenger pigeon (lower left)

The genus name, Ectopistes, translates as "moving about" or "wandering", while the specific name, migratorius, indicates its migratory habits. The full binomial can thus be translated as "migratory wanderer". The English common name "passenger pigeon" derives from the French word passager, which means "to pass by" in a fleeting manner. While the pigeon was extant, the name "passenger pigeon" was used interchangeably with "wild pigeon". The bird also gained some less-frequently used names, including blue pigeon, merne rouck pigeon, wandering long-tailed dove, and wood pigeon. In the 18th century, the passenger pigeon was known as tourte in New France (in modern Canada), but to the French in Europe it was known as tourtre. In modern French, the bird is known as tourte voyageuse or pigeon migrateur, among other names.

In the Native American Algonquian languages, the pigeon was called amimi by the Lenape, omiimii by the Ojibwe, and mimia by the Kaskaskia Illinois. Other names in indigenous American languages include oriteʼkó꞉wa in Mohawk, tsahgó:wa:ˀ in Cayuga, dzä́:hgo:wa:’ in Seneca, and putchee nashoba, or "lost dove", in Choctaw. The Seneca people called the pigeon jahgowa, meaning "big bread", as it was a source of food for their tribes. Chief Simon Pokagon of the Potawatomi stated that his people called the pigeon O-me-me-wog, and that the Europeans did not adopt native names for the bird, as it reminded them of their domesticated pigeons, instead calling them "wild" pigeons, as they called the native peoples "wild" men.

== Description ==
Turntable video of an adult male specimen at Naturalis Biodiversity Center

The passenger pigeon was sexually dimorphic in size and coloration. It weighed between 260 and 340 g (9.2 and 12.0 oz). The adult male was about 390 to 410 mm (15.4 to 16.1 in) in length. It had a bluish-gray head, nape, and hindneck. On the sides of the neck and the upper mantle were iridescent display feathers that have variously been described as being a bright bronze, violet, or golden-green, depending on the angle of the light. The upper back and wings were a pale or slate gray tinged with olive brown, that turned into grayish-brown on the lower wings. The lower back and rump were a dark blue-gray that became grayish-brown on the upper tail-covert feathers. The greater and median wing-covert feathers were pale gray, with a small number of irregular black spots near the end. The primary and secondary feathers of the wing were a blackish-brown with a narrow white edge on the outer side of the secondaries. The two central tail feathers were brownish gray, and the rest were white.

The tail pattern was distinctive as it had white outer edges with blackish spots that were prominently displayed in flight. The lower throat and breast were richly pinkish-rufous, grading into a paler pink further down, and into white on the abdomen and undertail covert feathers. The undertail coverts also had a few black spots. The bill was black, while the feet and legs were a bright coral red. It had a carmine-red iris surrounded by a narrow purplish-red eye-ring. The wing of the male measured 196 to 215 mm (7.7 to 8.5 in), the tail 175 to 210 mm (6.9 to 8.3 in), the bill 15 to 18 mm (0.59 to 0.71 in), and the tarsus was 26 to 28 mm (1.0 to 1.1 in).

Turntable video of an adult female specimen at Naturalis

The adult female passenger pigeon was slightly smaller than the male at 380 to 400 mm (15.0 to 15.7 in) in length. It was duller than the male overall, and was a grayish-brown on the forehead, crown, and nape down to the scapulars, and the feathers on the sides of the neck had less iridescence than those of the male. The lower throat and breast were a buff-gray that developed into white on the belly and undertail-coverts. It was browner on the upperparts and paler buff brown and less rufous on the underparts than the male. The wings, back, and tail were similar in appearance to those of the male except that the outer edges of the primary feathers were edged in buff or rufous buff. The wings had more spotting than those of the male. The tail was shorter than that of the male, and the legs and feet were a paler red. The iris was orange red, with a grayish blue, naked orbital ring. The wing of the female was 180 to 210 mm (7.1 to 8.3 in), the tail 150 to 200 mm (5.9 to 7.9 in), the bill 15 to 18 mm (0.59 to 0.71 in), and the tarsus was 25 to 28 mm (0.98 to 1.10 in).

Turntable video of a juvenile female specimen at Naturalis

The juvenile passenger pigeon was similar in plumage to the adult female, but lacked the spotting on the wings, and was a darker brownish-gray on the head, neck, and breast. The feathers on the wings had pale gray fringes (also described as white tips), giving it a scaled look. The secondaries were brownish-black with pale edges, and the tertial feathers had a rufous wash. The primaries were also edged with a rufous-brown color. The neck feathers had no iridescence. The legs and feet were dull red, and the iris was brownish, and surrounded by a narrow carmine ring. The plumage of the sexes was similar during their first year.

Of the hundreds of surviving skins, only one appears to be aberrant in color—an adult female from the collection of Walter Rothschild, Natural History Museum at Tring. It is a washed brown on the upper parts, wing covert, secondary feathers, and tail (where it would otherwise have been gray), and white on the primary feathers and underparts. The normally black spots are brown, and it is pale gray on the head, lower back, and upper-tail covert feathers, yet the iridescence is unaffected. The brown mutation is a result of a reduction in eumelanin, due to incomplete synthesis (oxidation) of this pigment. This sex-linked mutation is common in female wild birds, but it is thought the white feathers of this specimen are instead the result of bleaching due to exposure to sunlight.

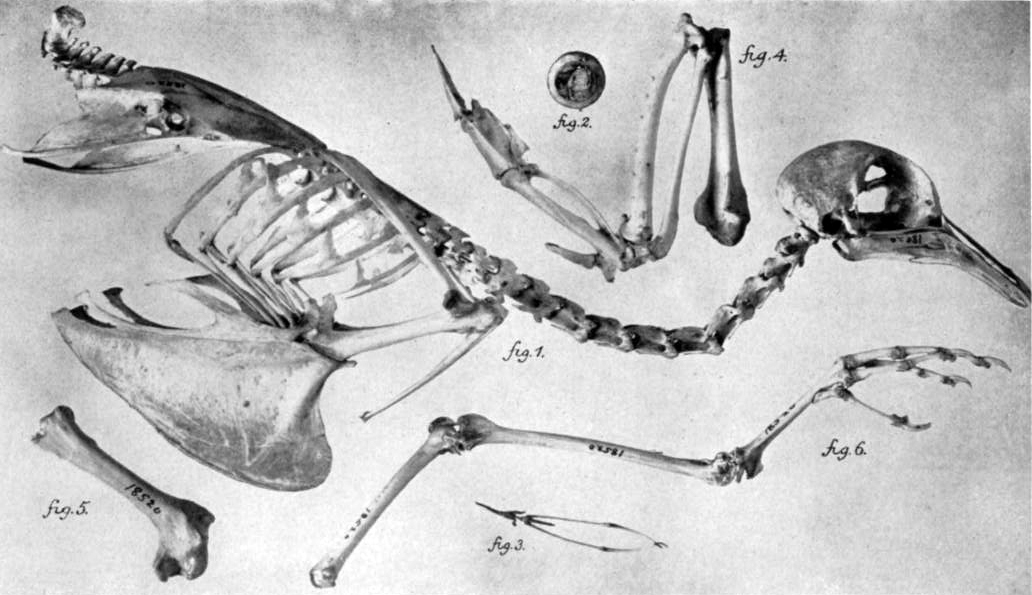
Skeleton of a male bird, 1914

The passenger pigeon was physically adapted for speed, endurance, and maneuverability in flight, and has been described as having a streamlined version of the typical pigeon shape, such as that of the generalized rock dove (Columba livia). The wings were very long and pointed, and measured 220 mm (8.7 in) from the wing-chord to the primary feathers, and 120 mm (4.7 in) to the secondaries. The tail, which accounted for much of its overall length, was long and wedge-shaped (or graduated), with two central feathers longer than the rest. The body was slender and narrow, and the head and neck were small.

The internal anatomy of the passenger pigeon has rarely been described. Robert W. Shufeldt found little to differentiate the bird's osteology from that of other pigeons when examining a male skeleton in 1914, but Julian P. Hume noted several distinct features in a more detailed 2015 description. The pigeon's particularly large breast muscles indicated a powerful flight (musculus pectoralis major for downstroke and the smaller musculus supracoracoideus for upstroke). The coracoid bone (which connects the scapula, furcula, and sternum) was large relative to the size of the bird, 33.4 mm (1.31 in), with straighter shafts and more robust articular ends than in other pigeons. The furcula had a sharper V-shape and was more robust, with expanded articular ends. The scapula was long, straight, and robust, and its distal end was enlarged. The sternum was very large and robust compared to that of other pigeons; its keel was 25 mm (0.98 in) deep. The overlapping uncinate processes, which stiffen the ribcage, were very well developed. The wing bones (humerus, radius, ulna, and carpometacarpus) were short but robust compared to other pigeons. The leg bones were similar to those of other pigeons.

=== Vocalizations ===
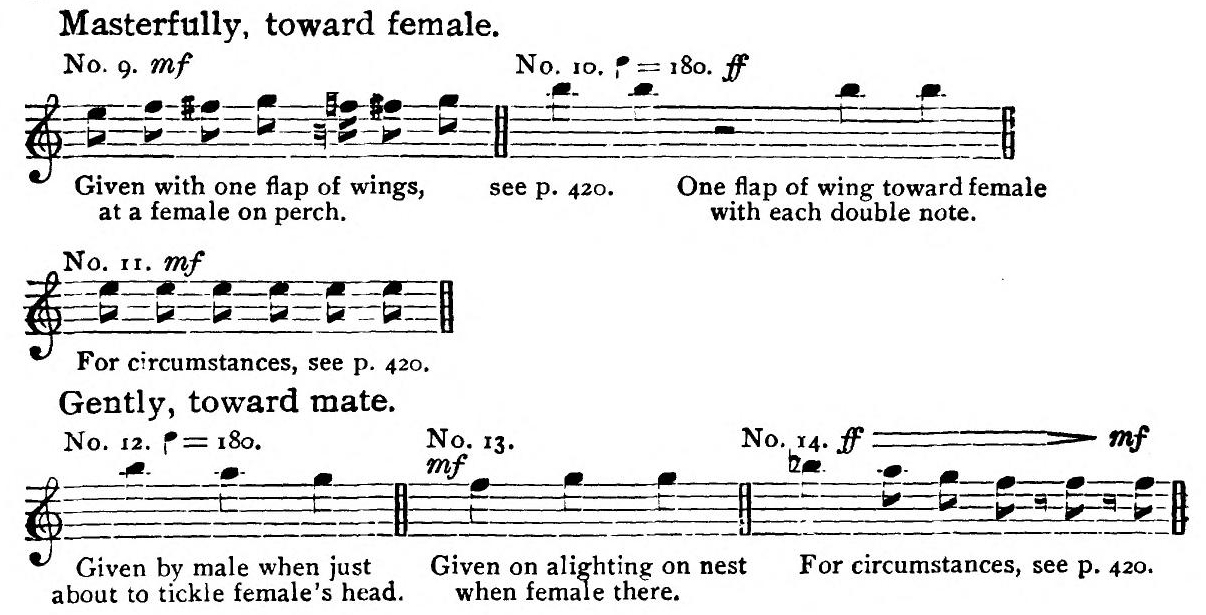
Musical notes documenting male vocalizations, compiled by Wallace Craig, 1911

The noise produced by flocks of passenger pigeons was described as deafening, audible for miles away, and the bird's voice as loud, harsh, and unmusical. It was also described by some as clucks, twittering, and cooing, and as a series of low notes, instead of an actual song. The birds apparently made croaking noises when building nests, and bell-like sounds when mating. During feeding, some individuals would give alarm calls when facing a threat, and the rest of the flock would join the sound while taking off.

In 1911, American behavioral scientist Wallace Craig published an account of the gestures and sounds of this species as a series of descriptions and musical notations, based on observation of C. O. Whitman's captive passenger pigeons in 1903. Craig compiled these records to assist in identifying potential survivors in the wild (as the physically similar mourning doves could otherwise be mistaken for passenger pigeons), while noting this "meager information" was likely all that would be left on the subject. According to Craig, one call was a simple harsh "keck" that could be given twice in succession with a pause in between. This was said to be used to attract the attention of another pigeon. Another call was a more frequent and variable scolding. This sound was described as "kee-kee-kee-kee" or "tete! tete! tete!", and was used to call either to its mate or towards other creatures it considered to be enemies. One variant of this call, described as a long, drawn-out "tweet", could be used to call down a flock of passenger pigeons passing overhead, which would then land in a nearby tree. "Keeho" was a soft cooing that, while followed by louder "keck" notes or scolding, was directed at the bird's mate. A nesting passenger pigeon would also give off a stream of at least eight mixed notes that were both high and low in tone and ended with "keeho". Overall, female passenger pigeons were quieter and called infrequently. Craig suggested that the loud, strident voice and "degenerated" musicality was the result of living in populous colonies where only the loudest sounds could be heard.

== Distribution and habitat ==
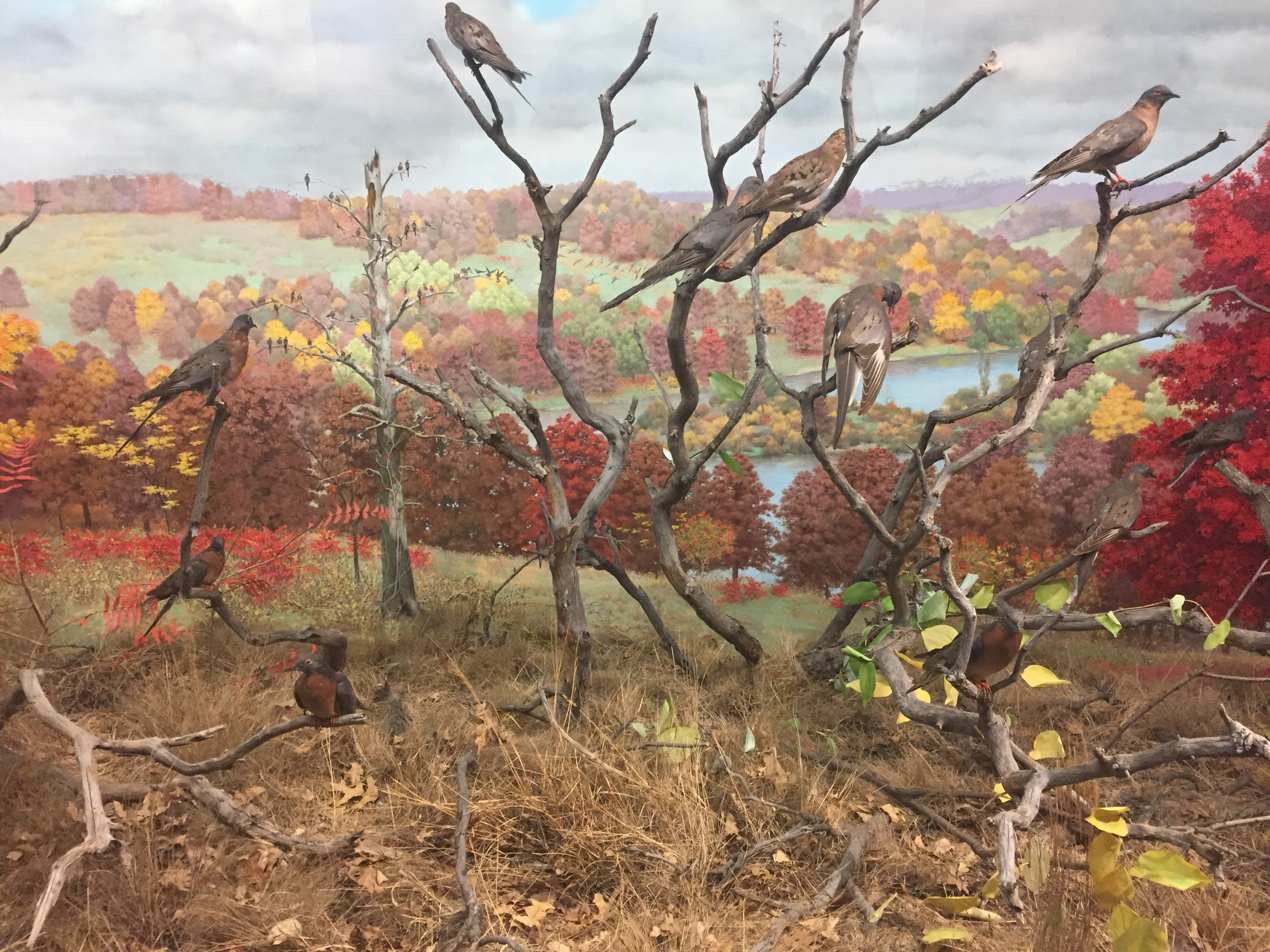
Mounted specimens representing a roosting group in 1890s Johnson County, Iowa, at Denver Museum of Nature and Science

The passenger pigeon was found across most of North America east of the Rocky Mountains, from the Great Plains to the Atlantic coast in the east, to the south of Canada in the north, and the north of Mississippi in the southern United States, coinciding with its primary habitat, the eastern deciduous forests. Within this range, it constantly migrated in search of food and shelter. It is unclear if the birds favored particular trees and terrain, but they were possibly not restricted to one type, as long as their numbers could be supported. It originally bred from the southern parts of eastern and central Canada south to eastern Kansas, Oklahoma, Mississippi, and Georgia in the United States, but the primary breeding range was in southern Ontario and the Great Lakes states south through states north of the Appalachian Mountains. Though the western forests were ecologically similar to those in the east, these were occupied by band-tailed pigeons, which may have kept out the passenger pigeons through competitive exclusion.

Humerus bone from the Pleistocene of Cartersville, Georgia, Tellus Science Museum

The passenger pigeon wintered from Arkansas, Tennessee, and North Carolina south to Texas, the Gulf Coast, and northern Florida, though flocks occasionally wintered as far north as southern Pennsylvania and Connecticut. It preferred to winter in large swamps, particularly those with alder trees; if swamps were not available, forested areas, particularly with pine trees, were favored roosting sites. There were also sightings of passenger pigeons outside of its normal range, including in several Western states, Bermuda, Cuba, and Mexico, particularly during severe winters. It has been suggested that some of these extralimital records may have been due to the paucity of observers rather than the actual extent of passenger pigeons; North America was then unsettled country, and the bird may have appeared anywhere on the continent except for the far west. There were also records of stragglers in Scotland, Ireland, and France, although these birds may have been escaped captives, or the records incorrect.

More than 130 passenger pigeon fossils have been found scattered across 25 US states, including in the La Brea Tar Pits of California. These records date as far back as 100,000 years ago in the Pleistocene era, during which the pigeon's range extended to several western states that were not a part of its modern range. The abundance of the species in these regions and during this time is unknown.

== Behavior and ecology ==
Live bird showing "highly characteristic attitude", 1896

A skilled flyer, the passenger pigeon is estimated to have averaged 100 km/h (62 mph) during migration. It flew with quick, repeated flaps that increased the bird's velocity the closer the wings got to the body. It was equally adept and quick flying through a forest as through open space. When landing, the pigeon flapped its wings repeatedly before raising them at the moment of landing. The pigeon was awkward when on the ground, and moved around with jerky, alert steps.

If the pigeon became alert, it would often stretch out its head and neck in line with its body and tail, then nod its head in a circular pattern. When aggravated by another pigeon, it raised its wings threateningly, but passenger pigeons almost never actually fought. The pigeon bathed in shallow water, and afterwards lay on each side in turn and raised the opposite wing to dry it.

The passenger pigeon drank at least once a day, typically at dawn, by fully inserting its bill into lakes, small ponds, and streams. Pigeons were seen perching on top of each other to access water, and if necessary, the species could alight on open water to drink. One of the primary causes of natural mortality was the weather, and every spring many individuals froze to death after migrating north too early. In captivity, a passenger pigeon was capable of living at least 15 years; Martha, the last known living passenger pigeon, was at least 17 and possibly as old as 29 when she died. It is undocumented how long wild pigeons lived.

=== Migration and social behavior ===
The passenger pigeon was nomadic, constantly migrating in search of food, shelter, or nesting grounds. In his 1831 Ornithological Biography, American naturalist and artist John James Audubon described a migration he observed in 1813 as follows:

I dismounted, seated myself on an eminence, and began to mark with my pencil, making a dot for every flock that passed. In a short time finding the task which I had undertaken impracticable, as the birds poured in in countless multitudes, I rose and, counting the dots then put down, found that 163 had been made in twenty-one minutes. I traveled on, and still met more the farther I proceeded. The air was literally filled with Pigeons; the light of noon-day was obscured as by an eclipse; the dung fell in spots, not unlike melting flakes of snow, and the continued buzz of wings had a tendency to lull my senses to repose ... I cannot describe to you the extreme beauty of their aerial evolutions, when a hawk chanced to press upon the rear of the flock. At once, like a torrent, and with a noise like thunder, they rushed into a compact mass, pressing upon each other towards the center. In these almost solid masses, they darted forward in undulating and angular lines, descended and swept close over the earth with inconceivable velocity, mounted perpendicularly so as to resemble a vast column, and, when high, were seen wheeling and twisting within their continued lines, which then resembled the coils of a gigantic serpent ... Before sunset I reached Louisville, distant from Hardensburgh fifty-five miles. The Pigeons were still passing in undiminished numbers and continued to do so for three days in succession.

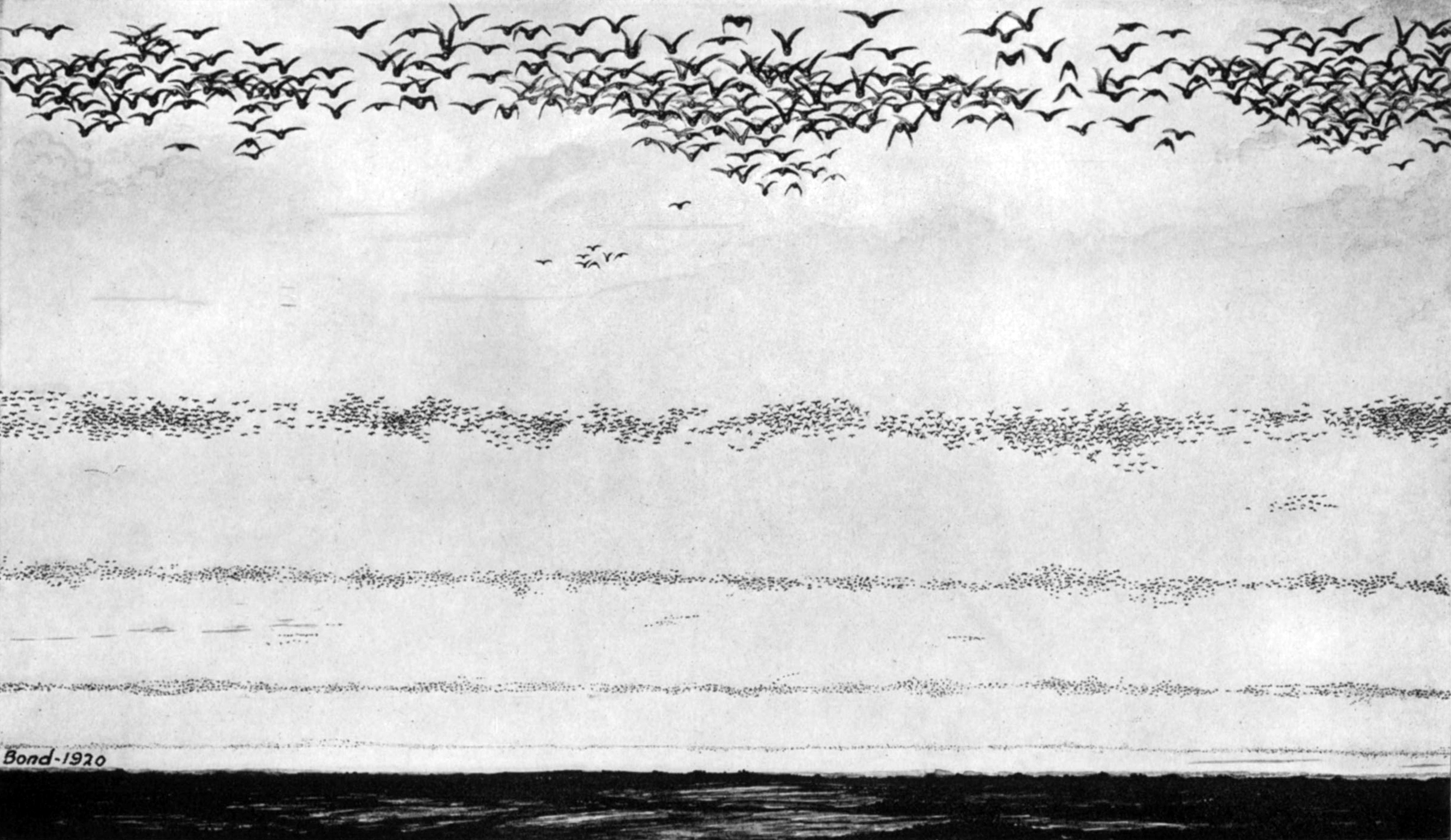
Illustration of migrating flocks, Frank Bond, 1920

These flocks were frequently described as being so dense that they blackened the sky and as having no sign of subdivisions. The flocks ranged from only 1.0 m (3.3 ft) above the ground in windy conditions to as high as 400 m (1,300 ft). These migrating flocks were typically in narrow columns that twisted and undulated, and they were reported as being in nearly every conceivable shape. A flock was also adept at following the lead of the pigeon in front of it, and flocks swerved together to avoid a predator.

The passenger pigeon was one of the most social of all land birds. Estimated to have numbered three to five billion at the height of its population, it may have been the most numerous bird on Earth; researcher Arlie W. Schorger believed that it accounted for between 25 and 40 percent of the total land bird population in the United States. The passenger pigeon's historic population is roughly the equivalent of the number of birds that overwinter in the United States every year in the early 21st century. Even within their range, the size of individual flocks could vary greatly. In November 1859, Henry David Thoreau, writing in Concord, Massachusetts, noted that "quite a little flock of [passenger] pigeons bred here last summer," while only seven years later, in 1866, one flock in southern Ontario was described as being 1.5 km (0.93 mi) wide and 500 km (310 mi) long, took 14 hours to pass, and held in excess of 3.5 billion birds. Such a number would likely represent a large fraction of the entire population at the time, or perhaps all of it. Most estimations of numbers were based on single migrating colonies, and it is unknown how many of these existed at a given time. American writer Christopher Cokinos has suggested that if the birds flew single file, they would have stretched around the Earth 22 times.

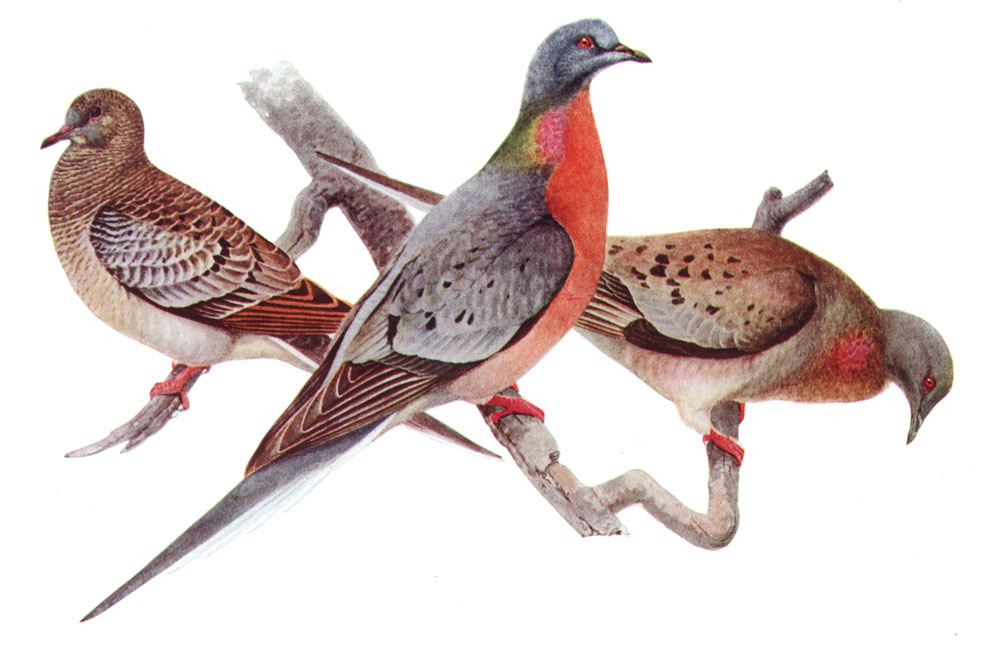
Juvenile (left), male (center), female (right), Louis Agassiz Fuertes, 1910

A communally roosting species, the passenger pigeon chose roosting sites that could provide shelter and enough food to sustain their large numbers for an indefinite period. The time spent at one roosting site may have depended on the extent of human persecution, weather conditions, or other, unknown factors. Roosts ranged in size and extent, from a few acres to 260 km^{2} (100 sq mi) or greater. Some roosting areas would be reused for subsequent years, others would only be used once. The passenger pigeon roosted in such numbers that even thick tree branches would break under the strain. The birds frequently piled on top of each other's backs to roost. They rested in a slumped position that hid their feet. They slept with their bills concealed by the feathers in the middle of the breast while holding their tail at a 45-degree angle. Dung could accumulate under a roosting site to a depth of over 0.3 m (1.0 ft).

=== Diet ===
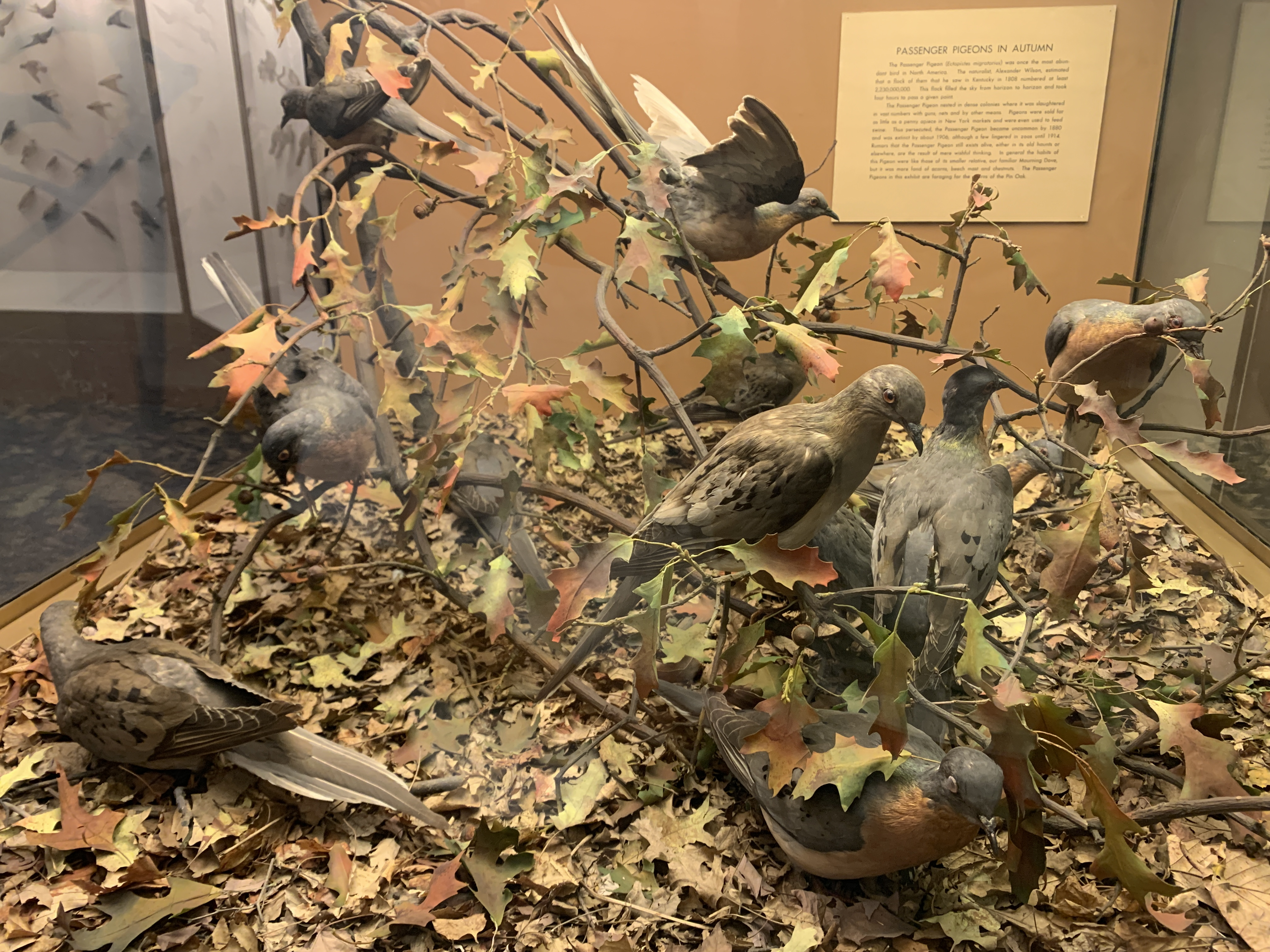
Taxidermied specimens mounted as if foraging for pin oak acorns, at the American Museum of Natural History.

Beeches and oaks produced the mast needed to support nesting and roosting flocks. The passenger pigeon changed its diet depending on the season. In the fall, winter, and spring, it mainly ate beechnuts, acorns, and chestnuts. During the summer, berries and softer fruits, such as blueberries, grapes, cherries, mulberries, pokeberries, and bunchberry, became the main objects of its consumption. It also ate worms, caterpillars, snails, and other invertebrates, particularly while breeding. It took advantage of cultivated grains, particularly buckwheat, when it found them. It was especially fond of salt, which it ingested either from brackish springs or salty soil.

Mast occurs in large quantities in different places at different times, and rarely in consecutive years, which is one of the reasons why the large flocks were constantly on the move. As mast is produced during autumn, there would have to be a large amount of it left by the summer, when the young were reared. It is unknown how they located this fluctuating food source, but their eyesight and flight powers helped them survey large areas for places that could provide food enough for a temporary stay.

The passenger pigeon foraged in flocks of tens or hundreds of thousands of individuals that overturned leaves, dirt, and snow with their bills in search of food. One observer described the motion of such a flock in search of mast as having a rolling appearance, as birds in the back of the flock flew overhead to the front of the flock, dropping leaves and grass in flight. The flocks had wide leading edges to better scan the landscape for food sources.

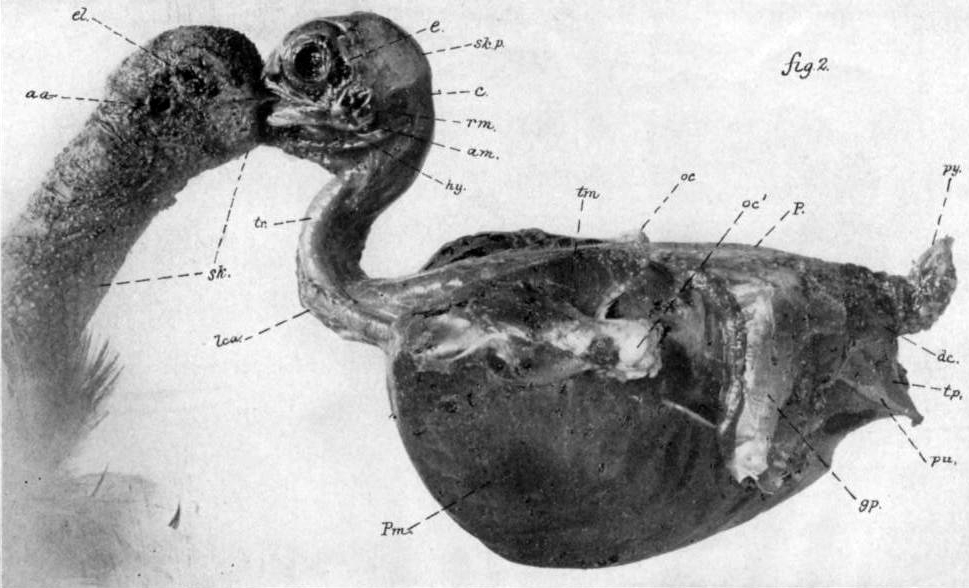
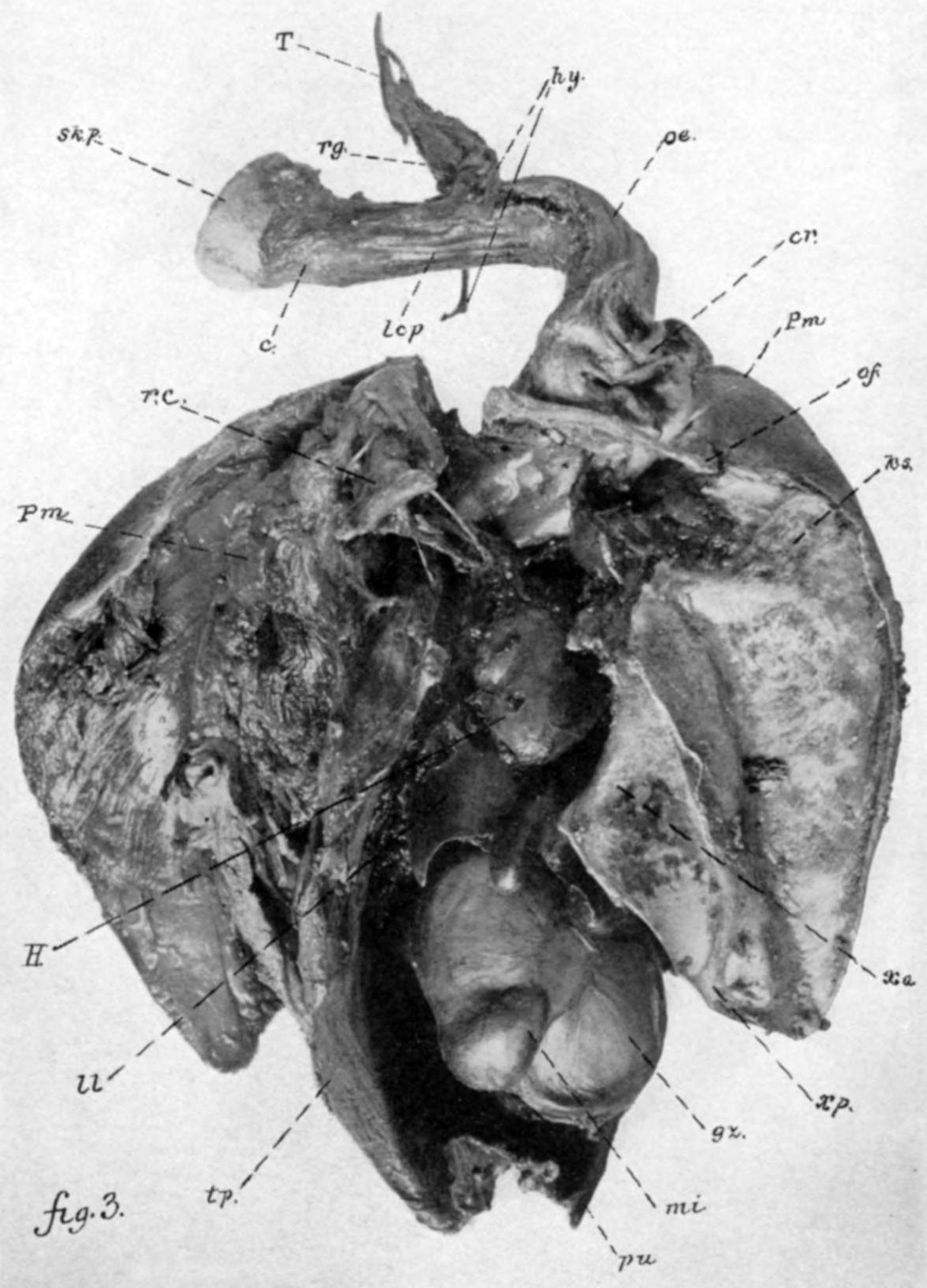
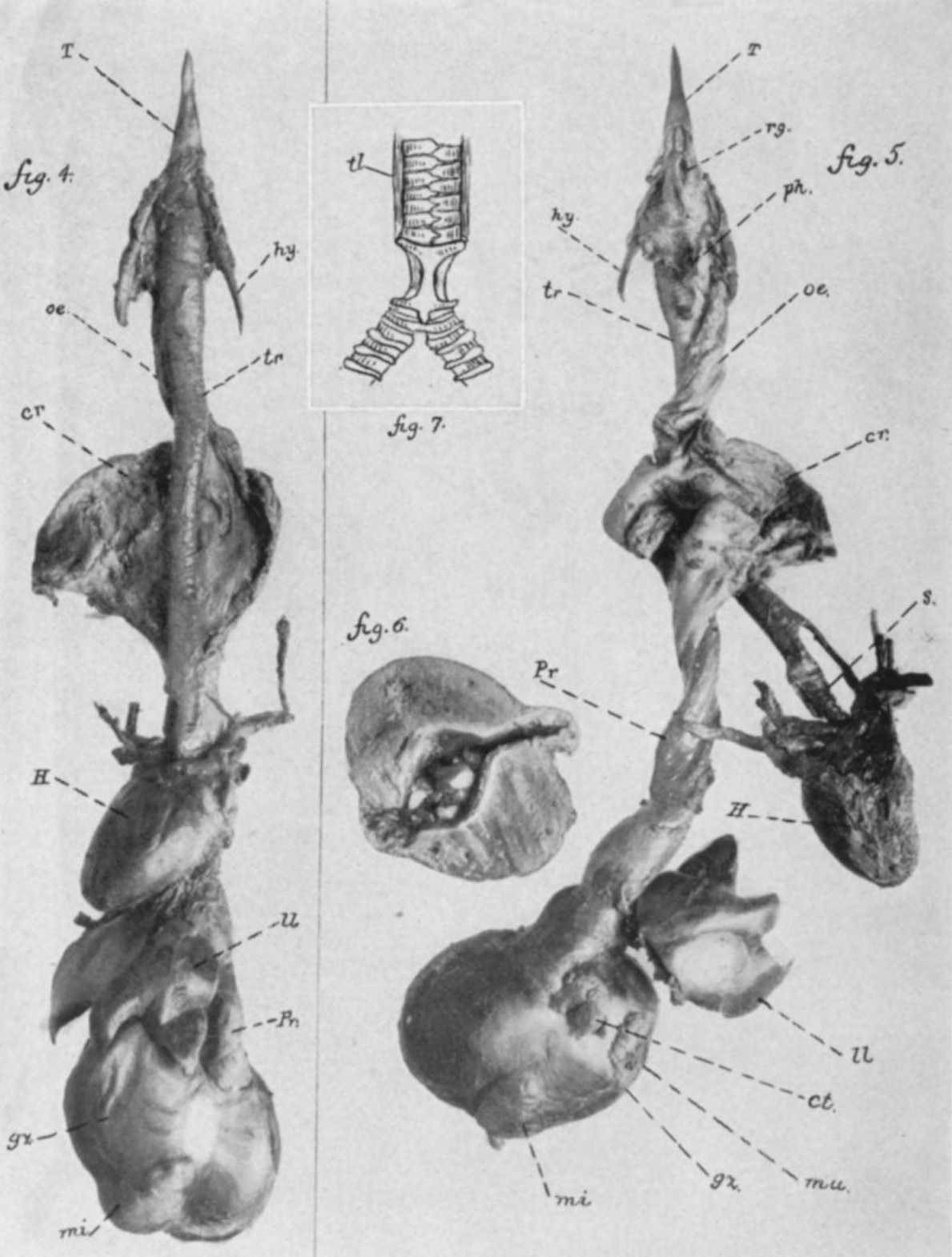
Skinned body and internal organs of Martha, the last individual: cr. denotes the crop, gz. the gizzard, 1915

When nuts on a tree loosened from their caps, a pigeon would land on a branch and, while flapping vigorously to stay balanced, grab the nut, pull it loose from its cap, and swallow it whole. Collectively, a foraging flock was capable of removing nearly all fruits and nuts from their path. Birds in the back of the flock flew to the front in order to pick over unsearched ground; however, birds never ventured far from the flock and hurried back if they became isolated. It is believed that the pigeons used social cues to identify abundant sources of food, and a flock of pigeons that saw others feeding on the ground often joined them. During the day, the birds left the roosting forest to forage on more open land. They regularly flew 100 to 130 km (62 to 81 mi) away from their roost daily in search of food, and some pigeons reportedly traveled as far as 160 km (99 mi), leaving the roosting area early and returning at night.

The passenger pigeon's very elastic mouth and throat and a joint in the lower bill enabled it to swallow acorns whole. It could store large quantities of food in its crop, which could expand to about the size of an orange, causing the neck to bulge and allowing a bird quickly to grab any food it discovered. The crop was described as being capable of holding at least 17 acorns or 28 beechnuts, 11 grains of corn, 100 maple seeds, plus other material; it was estimated that a passenger pigeon needed to eat about 61 cm^{3} (3.7 in^{3}) of food a day to survive. If shot, a pigeon with a crop full of nuts would fall to the ground with a sound described as like the rattle of a bag of marbles. After feeding, the pigeons perched on branches and digested the food stored in their crop overnight with the aid of a muscular gizzard, which often contained gravel.

The pigeon could eat and digest 100 g (3.5 oz) of acorns per day. At the historic population of three billion passenger pigeons, this amounted to 210,000,000 L (55,000,000 US gal) of food a day. The pigeon could regurgitate food from its crop when more desirable food became available. A 2018 study found that the dietary range of the passenger pigeon was restricted to certain sizes of seed, due to the size of its gape. This would have prevented it from eating some of the seeds of trees such as red oaks, black oaks, and the American chestnut. Specifically, the study found that between 13% and 69% of red oak seeds were too large for passenger pigeons to have swallowed, that only a "small proportion" of the seeds of black oaks and American chestnuts were too large for the birds to consume, and that all white oak seeds were sized within an edible range. They also found that seeds would be completely destroyed during digestion, which therefore hindered dispersal of seeds this way. Instead, passenger pigeons may have spread seeds by regurgitation, or after dying.

=== Reproduction ===
Nesting captive bird, wary of the photographer

Other than finding roosting sites, the migrations of the passenger pigeon were connected with finding places appropriate for this communally breeding bird to nest and raise its young. It is not certain how many times a year the birds bred; once seems most likely, but some accounts suggest more. The nesting period lasted around four to six weeks. The flock arrived at a nesting ground around March in southern latitudes, and some time later in more northern areas. The pigeon had no site fidelity, often choosing to nest in a different location each year. The formation of a nesting colony did not necessarily take place until several months after the pigeons arrived on their breeding grounds, typically during late March, April, or May.

The colonies, which were known as "cities", were immense, ranging from 49 ha (120 acres) to thousands of hectares in size, and were often long and narrow in shape (L-shaped), with a few areas untouched for unknown reasons. Due to the topography, they were rarely continuous. Since no accurate data was recorded, it is not possible to give more than estimates on the size and population of these nesting areas, but most accounts mention colonies containing millions of birds. The largest nesting area ever recorded was in central Wisconsin in 1871; it was reported as covering 2,200 km^{2} (850 sq mi), with the number of birds nesting there estimated to be around 136,000,000. As well as these "cities", there were regular reports of much smaller flocks or even individual pairs setting up a nesting site. The birds do not seem to have formed as vast breeding colonies at the periphery of their range.

Courtship took place at the nesting colony. Unlike other pigeons, courtship took place on a branch or perch. The male, with a flourish of the wings, made a "keck" call while near a female. The male then gripped tightly to the branch and vigorously flapped his wings up and down. When the male was close to the female, he then pressed against her on the perch with his head held high and pointing at her. If receptive, the female pressed back against the male. When ready to mate, the pair preened each other. This was followed by the birds billing, in which the female inserted its bill into and clasped the male's bill, shook for a second, and separated quickly while standing next to each other. The male then scrambled onto the female's back and copulated, which was then followed by soft clucking and occasionally more preening. John James Audubon described the courtship of the passenger pigeon as follows:

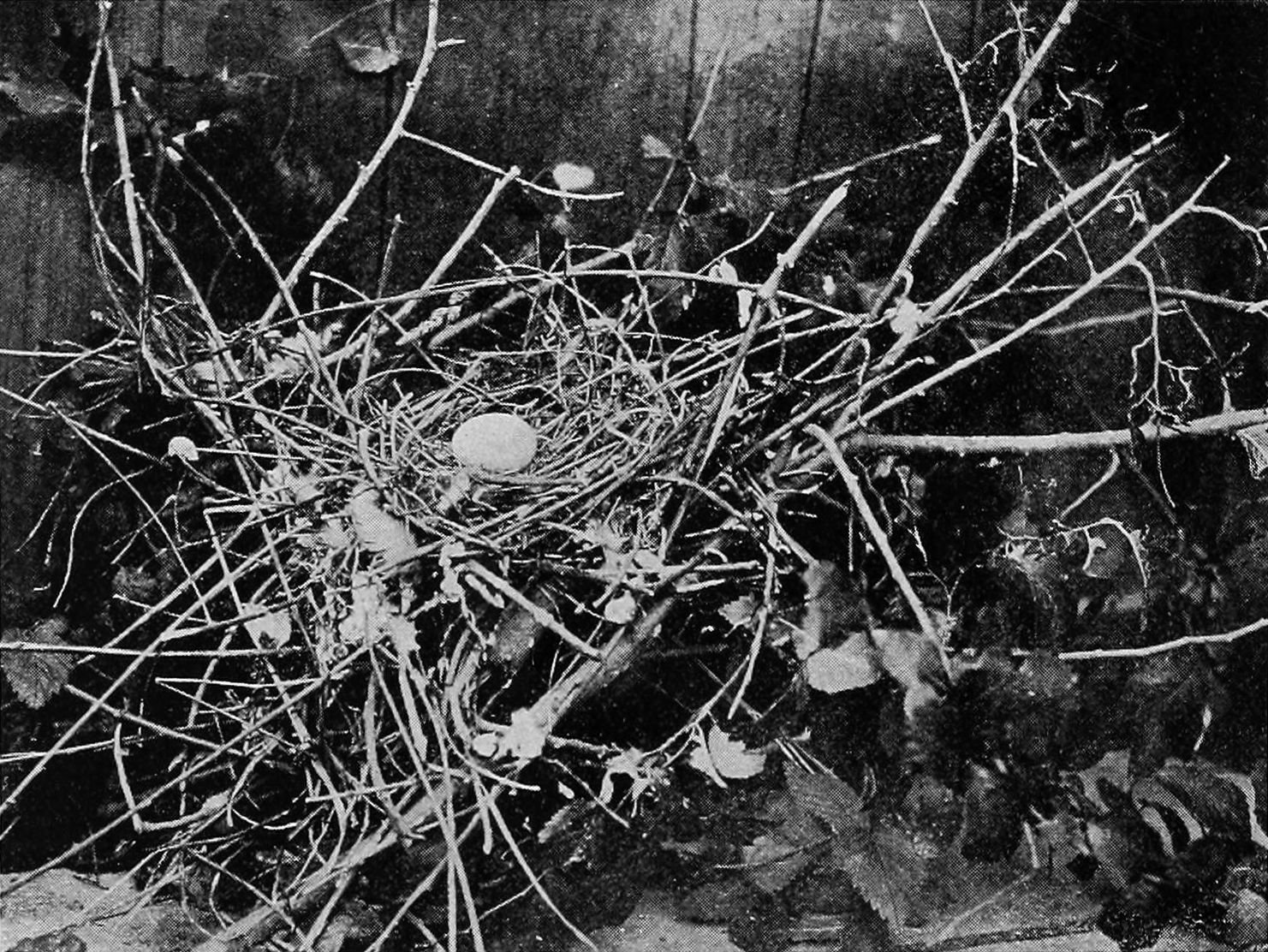
Nest and egg in Whitman's aviary

Thither the countless myriads resort, and prepare to fulfill one of the great laws of nature. At this period the note of the Pigeon is a soft coo-coo-coo-coo much shorter than that of the domestic species. The common notes resemble the monosyllables kee-kee-kee-kee, the first being the loudest, the others gradually diminishing In power. The male assumes a pompous demeanor, and follows the female, whether on the ground or on the branches, with spread tail and drooping wings, which it rubs against the part over which it is moving. The body is elevated, the throat swells, the eyes sparkle. He continues his notes, and now and then rises on the wing, and flies a few yards to approach the fugitive and timorous female. Like the domestic Pigeon and other species, they caress each other by billing, in which action, the bill of the one is introduced transversely into that of the other, and both parties alternately disgorge the contents of their crop by repeated efforts.

After observing captive birds, Wallace Craig found that this species did less charging and strutting than other pigeons (as it was awkward on the ground), and thought it probable that no food was transferred during their brief billing (unlike in other pigeons), and he therefore considered Audubon's description partially based on analogy with other pigeons as well as imagination.

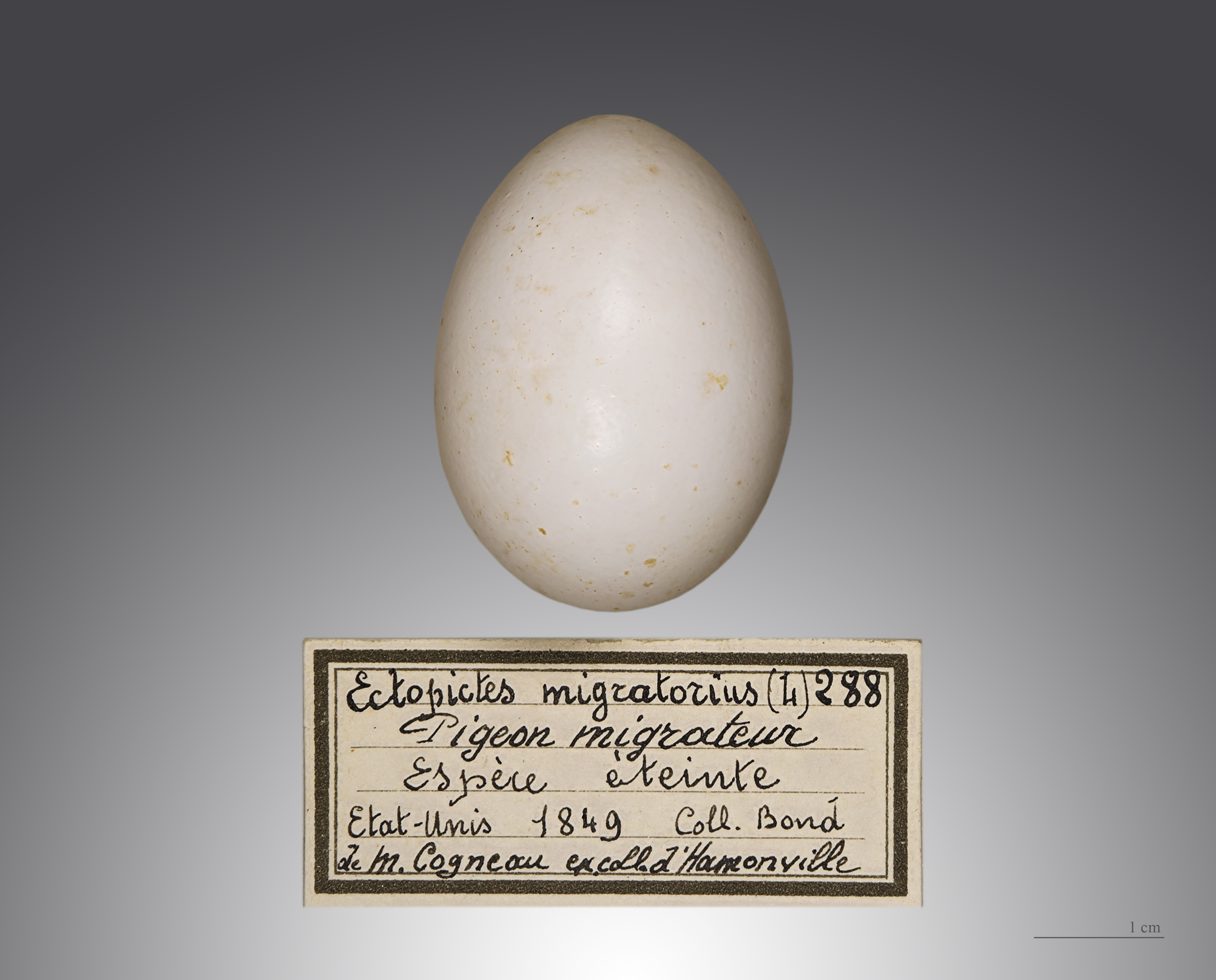
Preserved egg, Muséum de Toulouse

Nests were built immediately after pair formation and took two to four days to construct; this process was highly synchronized within a colony. The female chose the nesting site by sitting on it and flicking her wings. The male then carefully selected nesting materials, typically twigs, and handed them to the female over her back. The male then went in search of more nesting material while the female constructed the nest beneath herself. Nests were built between 2.0 and 20.1 m (6.6 and 65.9 ft) above the ground, though typically above 4.0 m (13.1 ft), and were made of 70 to 110 twigs woven together to create a loose, shallow bowl through which the egg could easily be seen. This bowl was then typically lined with finer twigs. The nests were about 150 mm (5.9 in) wide, 61 mm (2.4 in) high, and 19 mm (0.75 in) deep. Though the nest has been described as crude and flimsy compared to those of many other birds, remains of nests could be found at sites where nesting had taken place several years prior. Nearly every tree capable of supporting nests had them, often more than 50 per tree; one hemlock was recorded as holding 317 nests. The nests were placed on strong branches close to the tree trunks. Some accounts state that ground under the nesting area looked as if it had been swept clean, due to all the twigs being collected at the same time, yet this area would also have been covered in dung. As both sexes took care of the nest, the pairs were monogamous for the duration of the nesting.

Live nestling or squab

Generally, the eggs were laid during the first two weeks of April across the pigeon's range. Each female laid its egg immediately or almost immediately after the nest was completed; sometimes the pigeon was forced to lay it on the ground if the nest was not complete. The normal clutch size appears to have been a single egg, but there is some uncertainty about this, as two have also been reported from the same nests. Occasionally, a second female laid its egg in another female's nest, resulting in two eggs being present. The egg was white and oval shaped and averaged 40 by 34 mm (1.6 by 1.3 in) in size. If the egg was lost, it was possible for the pigeon to lay a replacement egg within a week. A whole colony was known to re-nest after a snowstorm forced them to abandon their original colony. Both parents incubated The egg for 12 to 14 days, with the male incubating it from midmorning to midafternoon and the female incubating it the rest of the time.

Immature bird

Upon hatching, the nestling (or squab) was blind and sparsely covered with yellow, hairlike down. The nestling developed quickly and within 14 days weighed as much as its parents. During this brooding period both parents took care of the nestling, with the male attending in the middle of the day and the female at other times. The nestlings were fed crop milk (a substance similar to curd, produced in the crops of the parent birds) exclusively for the first days after hatching. Adult food was gradually introduced after three to six days. After 13 to 15 days, the parents fed the nestling for a last time and then abandoned it, leaving the nesting area en masse. The nestling begged in the nest for a day or two, before climbing from the nest and fluttering to the ground, whereafter it moved around, avoided obstacles, and begged for food from nearby adults. It was another three or four days before it fledged. The entire nesting cycle lasted about 30 days. It is unknown whether colonies re-nested after a successful nesting. The passenger pigeon sexually matured during its first year and bred the following spring.

=== Predators and parasites ===
Adult with its young in Whitman's aviary; the young were vulnerable to predators after leaving the nest

Nesting colonies attracted large numbers of predators, including American minks (Neogale vison), long-tailed weasels (Neogale frenata), American martens (Martes americana), and raccoons (Procyon lotor) that preyed on eggs and nestlings, birds of prey, such as owls, hawks, and eagles that preyed on nestlings and adults, and wolves (Canis lupus), foxes (Urocyon cinereoargenteus and Vulpes vulpes), bobcats (Lynx rufus), American black bears (Ursus americanus), and cougars (Puma concolor) that preyed on injured adults and fallen nestlings. Hawks of the genus Accipiter and falcons pursued and preyed upon pigeons in flight, which in turn executed complex aerial maneuvers to avoid them; Cooper's hawk (Accipiter cooperii) was known as the "great pigeon hawk" due to its successes, and these hawks allegedly followed migrating passenger pigeons. While many predators were drawn to the flocks, individual pigeons were largely protected due to the sheer size of the flock, and overall little damage could be inflicted on the flock by predation. Despite the number of predators, nesting colonies were so large that they were estimated to have a 90% success rate if not disturbed. After being abandoned and leaving the nest, the very fat juveniles were vulnerable to predators until they were able to fly. The sheer number of juveniles on the ground meant that only a small percentage of them were killed; predator satiation may therefore be one of the reasons for the extremely social habits and communal breeding of the species.

Two parasites have been recorded on passenger pigeons. One species of phtilopterid louse, Columbicola extinctus, was originally thought to have lived on just passenger pigeons and to have become coextinct with them. This was proven inaccurate in 1999 when C. extinctus was rediscovered living on band-tailed pigeons. This, and the fact that the related louse C. angustus is mainly found on cuckoo-doves, further supports the relation between these pigeons, as the phylogeny of lice broadly mirrors that of their hosts. Another louse, Campanulotes defectus, was thought to have been unique to the passenger pigeon, but is now believed to have been a case of a contaminated specimen, as the species is considered to be the still-extant Campanulotes flavus of Australia. There is no record of a wild pigeon dying of either disease or parasites.

=== Ecological significance ===
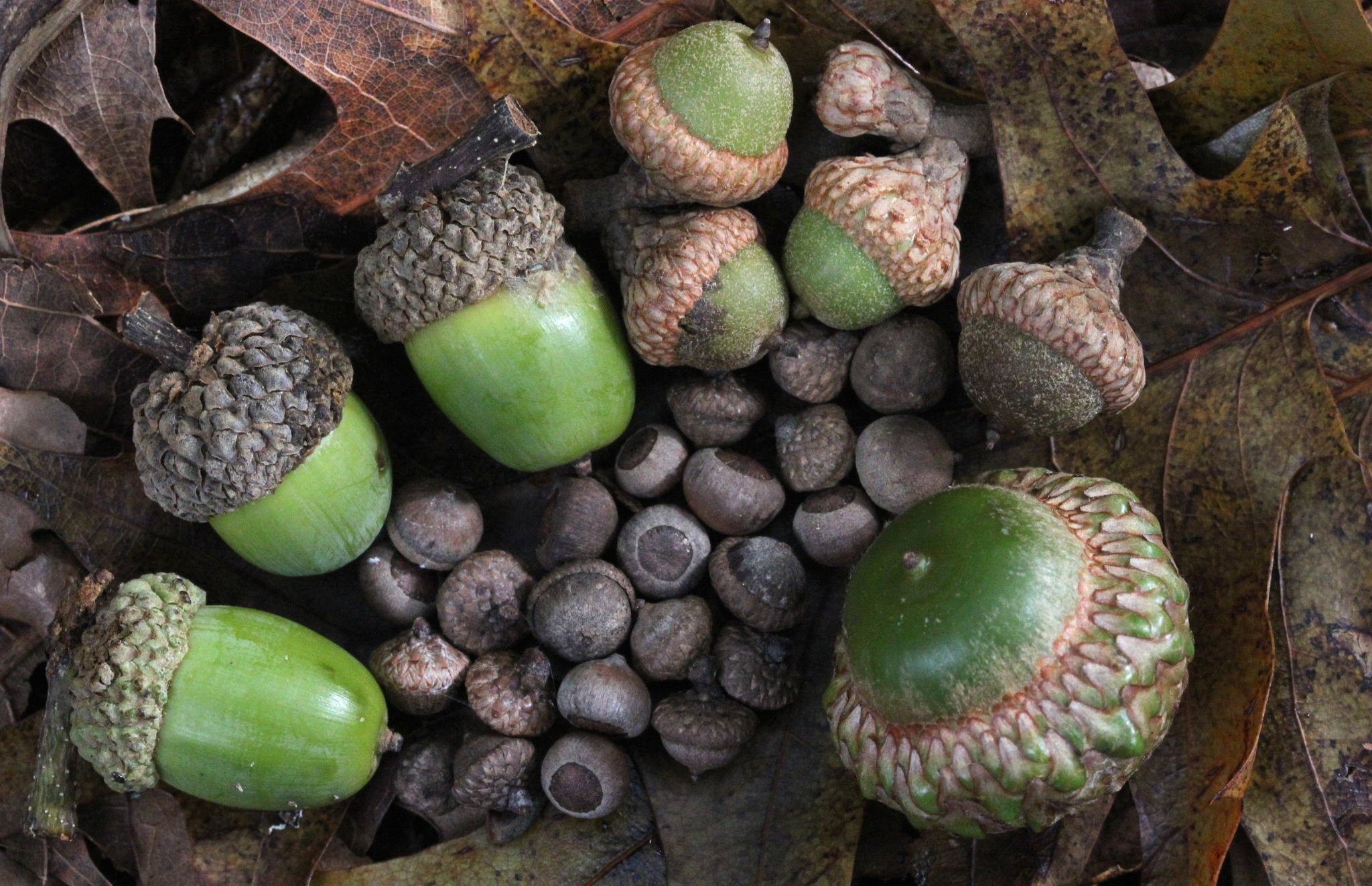
Acorns in South Carolina, among the diet of this bird

The bird is believed to have played a significant ecological role in the composition of pre-Columbian forests of eastern North America. For instance, while the passenger pigeon was extant, forests were dominated by white oaks. This species germinated in the fall, therefore making its seeds almost useless as a food source during the spring breeding season, while red oaks produced acorns during the spring, which the pigeons devoured. The absence of the passenger pigeon's seed consumption may have contributed to the modern dominance of red oaks. Due to the immense amount of dung present at roosting sites, few plants grew for years after the pigeons left. Also, the accumulation of flammable debris (such as limbs broken from trees and foliage killed by excrement) at these sites may have increased both the frequency and intensity of forest fires, which would have favored fire-tolerant species, such as bur oaks, black oaks, and white oaks over less fire-tolerant species, such as red oaks, thus helping to explain the change in the composition of eastern forests since the passenger pigeon's extinction (from white oaks, bur oaks, and black oaks predominating in presettlement forests, to the "dramatic expansion" of red oaks today).

A study released in 2018 concluded that the "vast numbers" of passenger pigeons present for "tens of thousands of years" would have influenced the evolution of the tree species whose seeds they ate. Those masting trees that produced seeds during the spring nesting season (such as red oaks) evolved so that some portion of their seeds would be too large for passenger pigeons to swallow (thus allowing some of their seeds to escape predation and grow new trees). White oak, in contrast, with its seeds sized consistently in the edible range, evolved an irregular masting pattern that took place in the fall, when fewer passenger pigeons would have been present. The study further concluded that this allowed white oaks to be the dominant tree species in regions where passenger pigeons were commonly present in the spring.

Specimens mounted as if foraging, Academy of Natural Sciences of Drexel University

With the large numbers in passenger pigeon flocks, the excrement they produced was enough to destroy surface-level vegetation at long-term roosting sites, while adding high quantities of nutrients to the ecosystem. Because of this—along with the breaking of tree limbs under their collective weight and the great amount of mast they consumed—passenger pigeons are thought to have influenced both the structure of eastern forests and the composition of the species present there. Due to these influences, some ecologists have considered the passenger pigeon a keystone species, with the disappearance of their vast flocks leaving a major gap in the ecosystem. Their role in creating forest disturbances has been linked to greater vertebrate diversity in forests by creating more niches for animals to fill. To help fill that ecological gap, it has been proposed that modern land managers attempt to replicate some of their effects on the ecosystem by creating openings in forest canopies to provide more understory light.

The American chestnut trees that provided much of the mast on which the passenger pigeon fed was itself almost driven to extinction by an imported Asian fungus (chestnut blight) around 1905. As many as thirty billion trees are thought to have died as a result in the following decades, but this did not affect the passenger pigeon, which was already extinct in the wild at the time.

After the disappearance of the passenger pigeon, the population of another acorn feeding species, the white-footed mouse, grew exponentially because of the increased availability of the seeds of the oak, beech, and chestnut trees. It has been speculated that the extinction of passenger pigeons may have increased the prevalence of tick-borne lyme disease in modern times as white-footed mice are the reservoir hosts of Borrelia burgdorferi.

=== Population genetics ===
Alert parent bird posing defiantly towards the camera (1896, published 1913)

A 2014 genetic study (based on coalescent theory and on "sequences from most of the genome" of three individual passenger pigeons) suggested that the passenger pigeon population experienced dramatic fluctuations across the last million years, due to their dependence on availability of mast (which itself fluctuates). The study suggested the bird was not always abundant, mainly persisting at around 1/10,000 the amount of the several billions estimated in the 1800s, with vastly larger numbers present during outbreak phases. Some early accounts also suggest that the appearance of flocks in great numbers was an irregular occurrence. These large fluctuations in population may have been the result of a disrupted ecosystem and have consisted of outbreak populations much larger than those common in pre-European times. The authors of the 2014 genetic study note that a similar analysis of the human population size arrives at an "effective population size" of between 9,000 and 17,000 individuals (or approximately 1/550,000th of the peak total human population size of 7 billion cited in the study).

Live male in Whitman's aviary, 1896/98

For a 2017 genetic study, the authors sequenced the genomes of two additional passenger pigeons, as well as analyzing the mitochondrial DNA of 41 individuals. This study found evidence that the passenger-pigeon population had been stable for at least the previous 20,000 years. The study also found that the size of the passenger pigeon population over that time period was larger than the found in the 2014 genetic study. However, the 2017 study's "conservative" estimate of an "effective population size" of 13 million birds is still only about 1/300th of the bird's estimated historic population of approximately 3–5 billion before their "19th century decline and eventual extinction." A similar study inferring human population size from genetics (published in 2008, and using human mitochondrial DNA and Bayesian coalescent inference methods) showed considerable accuracy in reflecting overall patterns of human population growth as compared to data deduced by other means—though the study arrived at a human effective population size (as of 1600 AD, for Africa, Eurasia, and the Americas combined) that was roughly 1/1000 of the census population estimate for the same time and area based on anthropological and historical evidence.

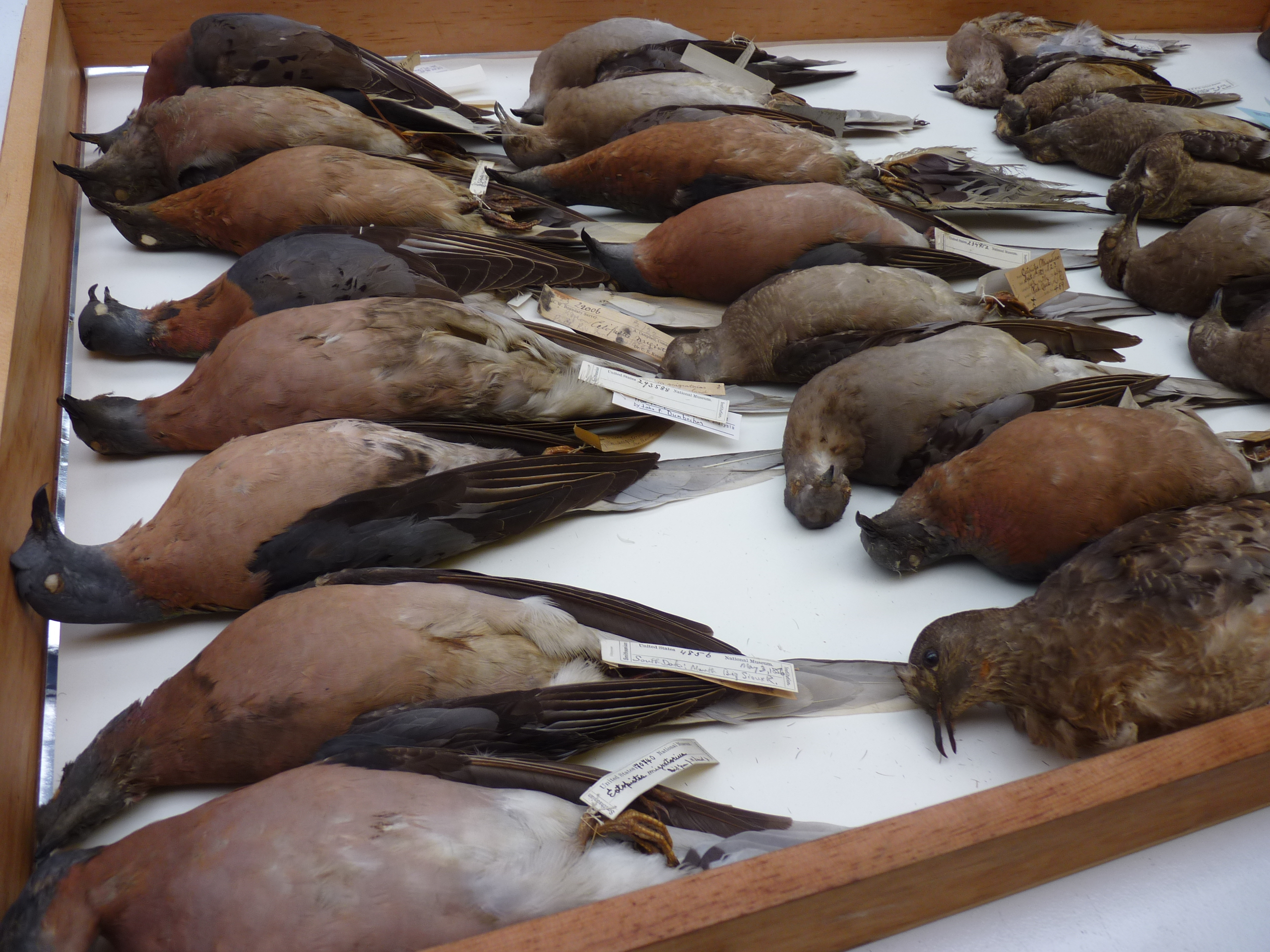
Study skins in the National Museum of Natural History

The 2017 passenger-pigeon genetic study also found that, in spite of its large population size, the genetic diversity was very low in the species. The authors suggested that this was a side-effect of natural selection, which theory and previous empirical studies suggested could have a particularly great impact on species with very large and cohesive populations. Natural selection can reduce genetic diversity over extended regions of a genome through selective sweeps or background selection. The authors found evidence of a faster rate of adaptive evolution and faster removal of harmful mutations in passenger pigeons compared to band-tailed pigeons, which are some of passenger pigeons' closest living relatives. They also found evidence of lower genetic diversity in regions of the passenger pigeon genome that have lower rates of genetic recombination. This is expected if natural selection, via selective sweeps or background selection, reduced their genetic diversity, but not if population instability did. The study concluded that earlier suggestion that population instability contributed to the extinction of the species was invalid. Evolutionary biologist A. Townsend Peterson said of the two passenger-pigeon genetic studies (published in 2014 and 2017) that, though the idea of extreme fluctuations in the passenger-pigeon population was "deeply entrenched," he was persuaded by the 2017 study's argument, due to its "in-depth analysis" and "massive data resources."

== Relationship with humans ==
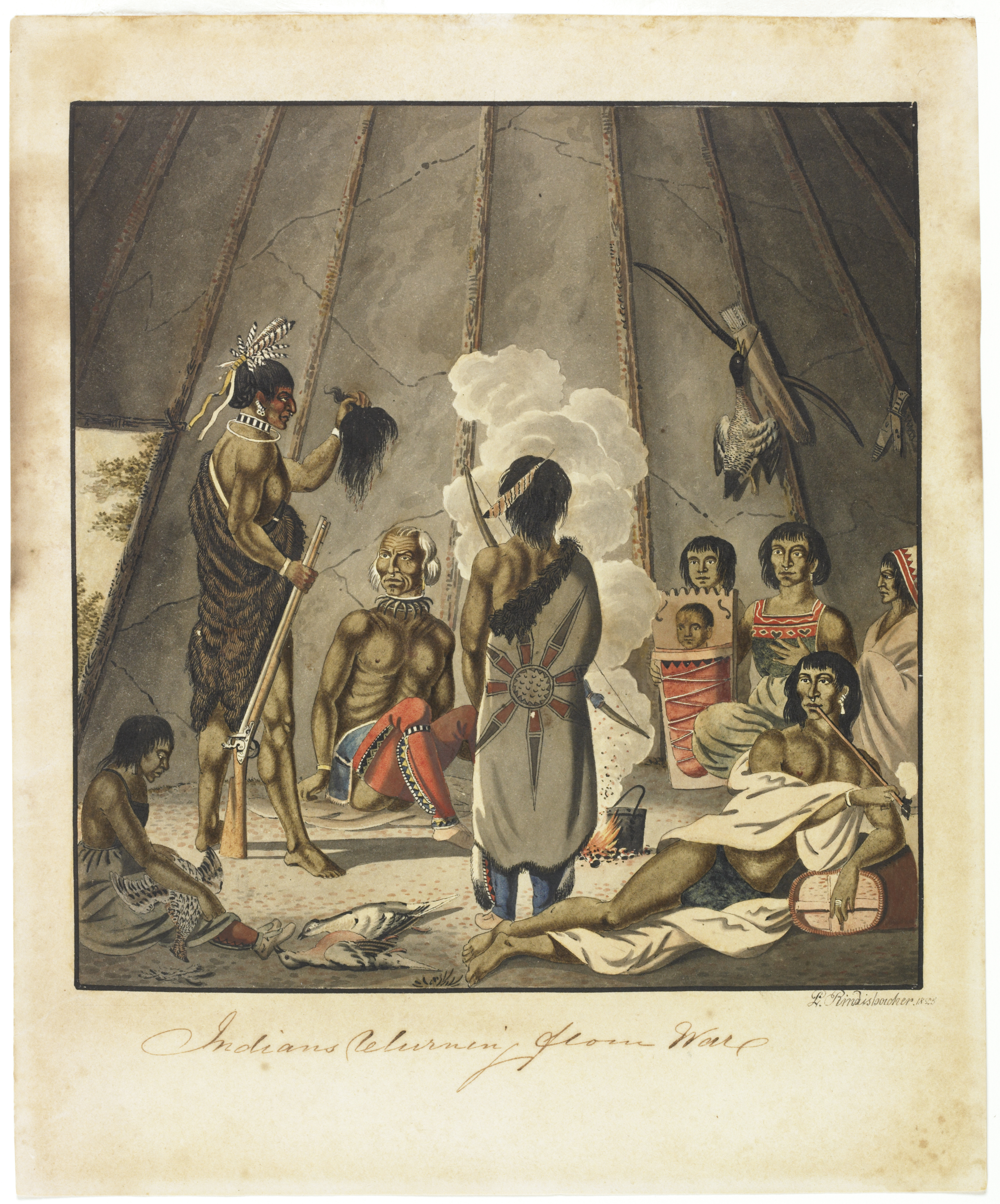
Illustration of Native American men returning from war, illustrated by Peter Rindisbacher in 1825; note passenger pigeon corpses on the floor

For fifteen thousand years or more before the arrival of Europeans in the Americas, passenger pigeons and Native Americans coexisted in the forests of what would later become the eastern part of the continental United States. A study published in 2008 found that, throughout most of the Holocene, Native American land-use practices greatly influenced forest composition. The regular use of controlled burns, the girdling of unwanted trees, and the planting and tending of favored trees suppressed the populations of a number of tree species that did not produce nuts, acorns, or fruit, while increasing the populations of numerous tree species that did. In addition, the burning away of forest-floor litter made these foods easier to find, once they had fallen from the trees. Some have argued that such Native American land-use practices increased the populations of various animal species, including the passenger pigeon, by increasing the food available to them, while elsewhere it has been claimed that, by hunting passenger pigeons and competing with them for some kinds of nuts and acorns, Native Americans suppressed their population size. Genetic research may shed some light on this question. A 2017 study of passenger-pigeon DNA found that the passenger-pigeon population size was stable for 20,000 years prior to its 19th-century decline and subsequent extinction, while a 2016 study of ancient Native American DNA found that the Native American population went through a period of rapid expansion, increasing 60-fold, starting about 13–16 thousand years ago. If both of these studies are correct, then a great change in the size of the Native American population had no apparent impact on the size of the passenger-pigeon population. This suggests that the net effect of Native American activities on passenger-pigeon population size was neutral.

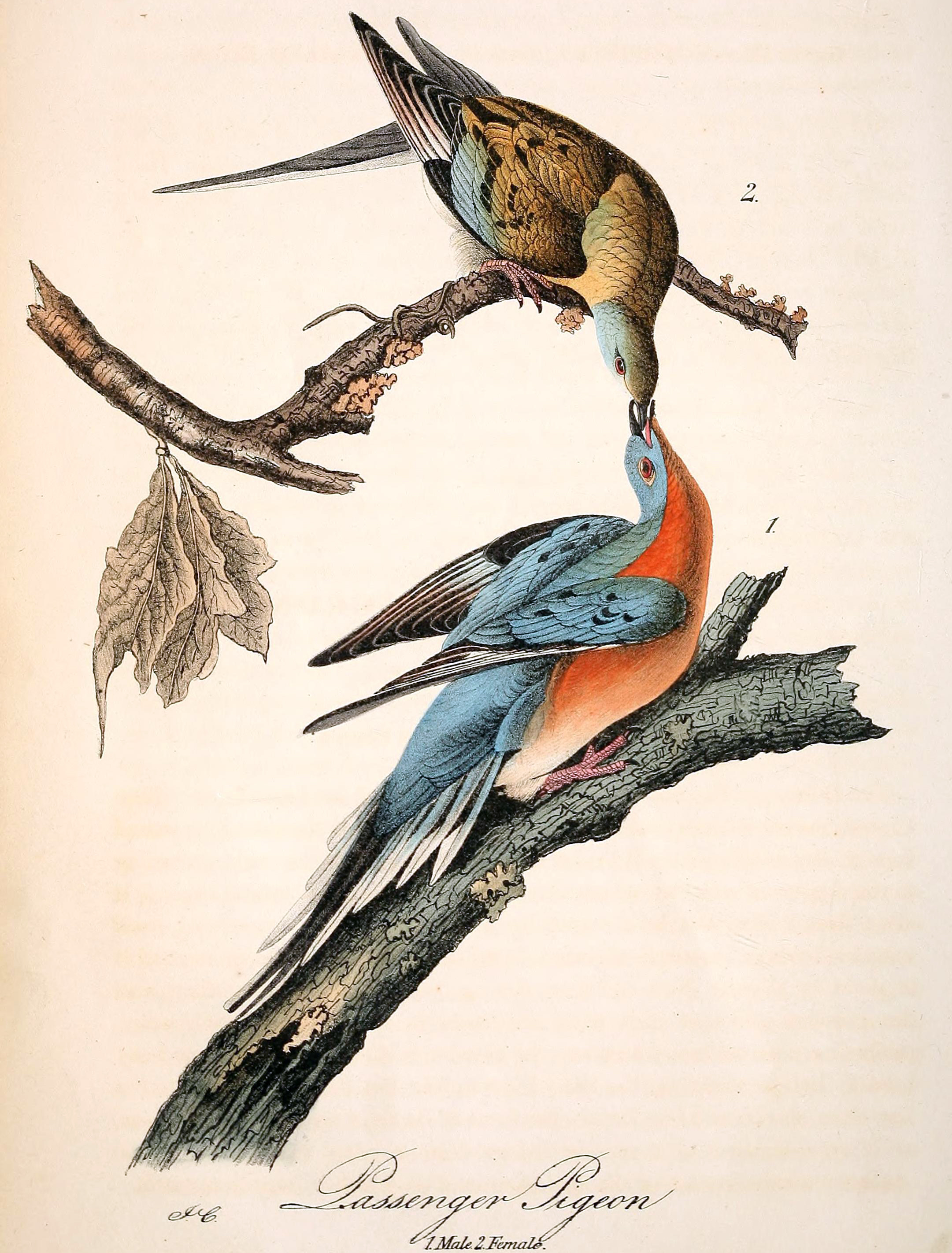
Billing pair by John James Audubon, from The Birds of America, 1827–1838. This image has been criticized for its scientific inaccuracy.

The passenger pigeon played a religious role for some northern Native American tribes. The Wendat people (or Huron) believed that every twelve years during the Feast of the Dead, the souls of the dead changed into passenger pigeons, which were then hunted and eaten. Before hunting the juvenile pigeons, the Seneca people made an offering of wampum and brooches to the old passenger pigeons; these were placed in a small kettle or other receptacle by a smoky fire. The Seneca people believed that a white pigeon was the chief of the passenger pigeon colony, and that a Council of Birds decided that the pigeons had to give their bodies to the Seneca because they were the only birds that nested in colonies. The Seneca developed a pigeon dance as a way of showing their gratitude. The Ho-Chunk people considered the passenger pigeon to be the bird of the chief, as they were served whenever the chieftain gave a feast.

French explorer Jacques Cartier was the first European to report on passenger pigeons, during his voyage in 1534. The bird was subsequently observed and noted by historical figures such as Samuel de Champlain and Cotton Mather. Most early accounts dwell on the vast number of pigeons, the resulting darkened skies, and the enormous amount of hunted birds (50,000 birds were reportedly sold at a Boston market in 1771). The early colonists thought that large flights of pigeons would be followed by ill fortune or sickness. When the pigeons wintered outside of their normal range, some believed that they would have "a sickly summer and autumn." In the 18th and 19th centuries, various parts of the pigeon were thought to have medicinal properties. The blood was supposed to be good for eye disorders, the powdered stomach lining was used to treat dysentery, and the dung was used to treat a variety of ailments, including headaches, stomach pains, and lethargy. Though they did not last as long as the feathers of a goose, the feathers of the passenger pigeon were frequently used for bedding. Pigeon feather beds were so popular that for a time in Saint-Jérôme, Quebec, every dowry included a bed and pillows made of pigeon feathers. In 1822, one family in Chautauqua County, New York, killed 4,000 pigeons in a day solely for this purpose.

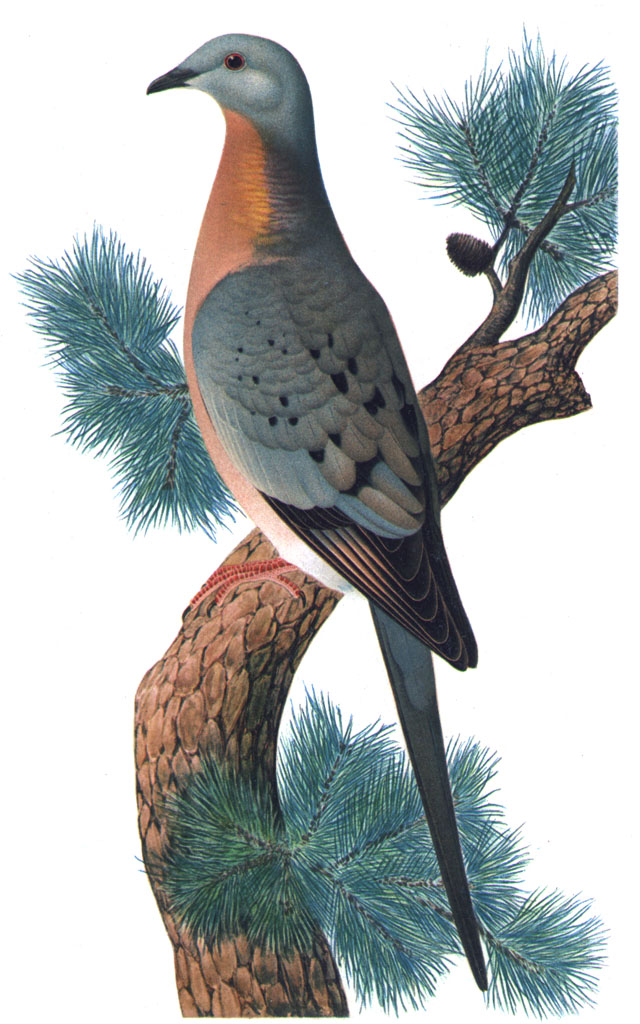
Painting of a male, K. Hayashi, c. 1900

The passenger pigeon was featured in the writings of many significant early naturalists, as well as accompanying illustrations. Mark Catesby's 1731 illustration, the first published depiction of this bird, is somewhat crude, according to some later commentators. The original watercolor that the engraving is based on was bought by the British royal family in 1768, along with the rest of Catesby's watercolors. The naturalists Alexander Wilson and John James Audubon both witnessed large pigeon migrations first hand, and published detailed accounts wherein both attempted to deduce the total number of birds involved. The most famous and often reproduced depiction of the passenger pigeon is Audubon's illustration (handcolored aquatint) in his book The Birds of America, published between 1827 and 1838. Audubon's image has been praised for its artistic qualities, but criticized for its supposed scientific inaccuracies. As Wallace Craig and R. W. Shufeldt (among others) pointed out, the birds are shown perched and billing one above the other, whereas they would instead have done this side by side, the male would be the one passing food to the female, and the male's tail would not be spread. Craig and Shufeldt instead cited illustrations by American artist Louis Agassiz Fuertes and Japanese artist K. Hayashi as more accurate depictions of the bird. Illustrations of the passenger pigeon were often drawn after stuffed birds, and Charles R. Knight is the only "serious" artist known to have drawn the species from life. He did so on at least two occasions; in 1903 he drew a bird possibly in one of the three aviaries with surviving birds, and some time before 1914, he drew Martha, the last individual, in the Cincinnati Zoo.

The bird has been written about (including in poems, songs, (Note: John Herald, a bluegrass singer, wrote a song dedicated to the extinction of the species and Martha, the species' endling, that he titled "Martha (Last of the Passenger Pigeons)". In connection with the centennial of Martha's death, the song was cited as evidence of her iconic stature—a symbol of the wanton slaughter of these pigeons and the human-caused extinction of the species.) and fiction) and illustrated by many notable writers and artists, and is depicted in art to this day, for example in Walton Ford's 2002 painting Falling Bough, and National Medal of Arts winner John A. Ruthven's 2014 mural in Cincinnati, which commemorates the 100th anniversary of Martha's death. The "Project Passenger Pigeon" outreach group used the centennial of its extinction to spread awareness about human-induced extinction, and to recognize its relevance in the 21st century. It has been suggested that the passenger pigeon could be used as a "flagship" species to spread awareness of other threatened, but less well-known North American birds.

=== Hunting ===
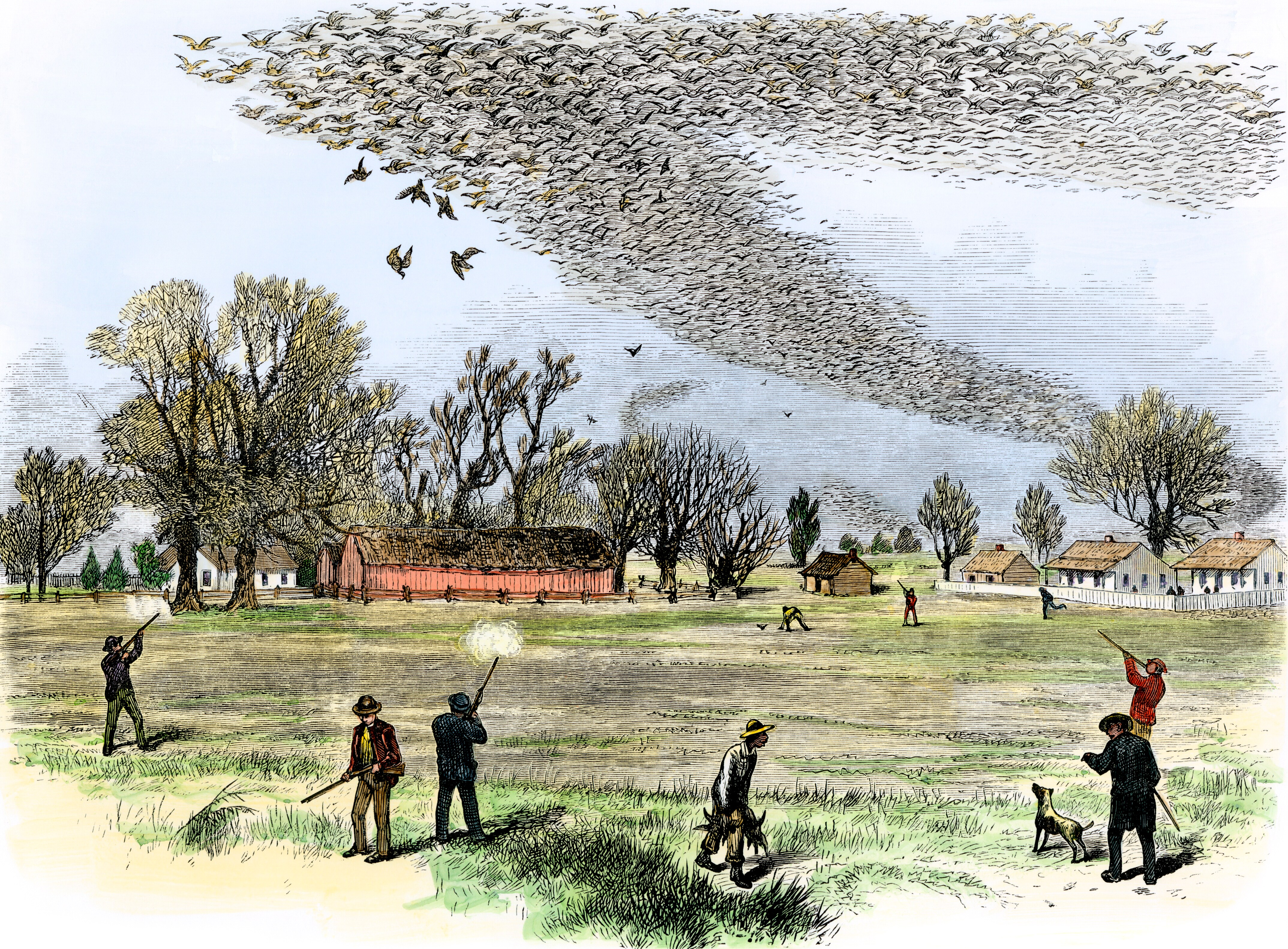
Depiction of a shooting in northern Louisiana, Smith Bennett, 1875

The passenger pigeon was an important source of food for the people of North America. Native Americans ate pigeons, and tribes near nesting colonies would sometimes move to live closer to them and eat the juveniles, killing them at night with long poles. Many Native Americans were careful not to disturb the adult pigeons, and instead ate only the juveniles as they were afraid that the adults might desert their nesting grounds; in some tribes, disturbing the adult pigeons was considered a crime. Away from the nests, large nets were used to capture adult pigeons, sometimes up to 800 at a time. Low-flying pigeons could be killed by throwing sticks or stones. At one site in Oklahoma, the pigeons leaving their roost every morning flew low enough that the Cherokee could throw clubs into their midst, which caused the lead pigeons to try to turn aside and in the process created a blockade that resulted in a large mass of flying, easily hit pigeons. Among the game birds, passenger pigeons were second only to the wild turkey (Meleagris gallopavo) in terms of importance for the Native Americans living in the southeastern United States. The bird's fat was stored, often in large quantities, and used as butter. Archaeological evidence supports the idea that Native Americans ate the pigeons frequently prior to colonization.

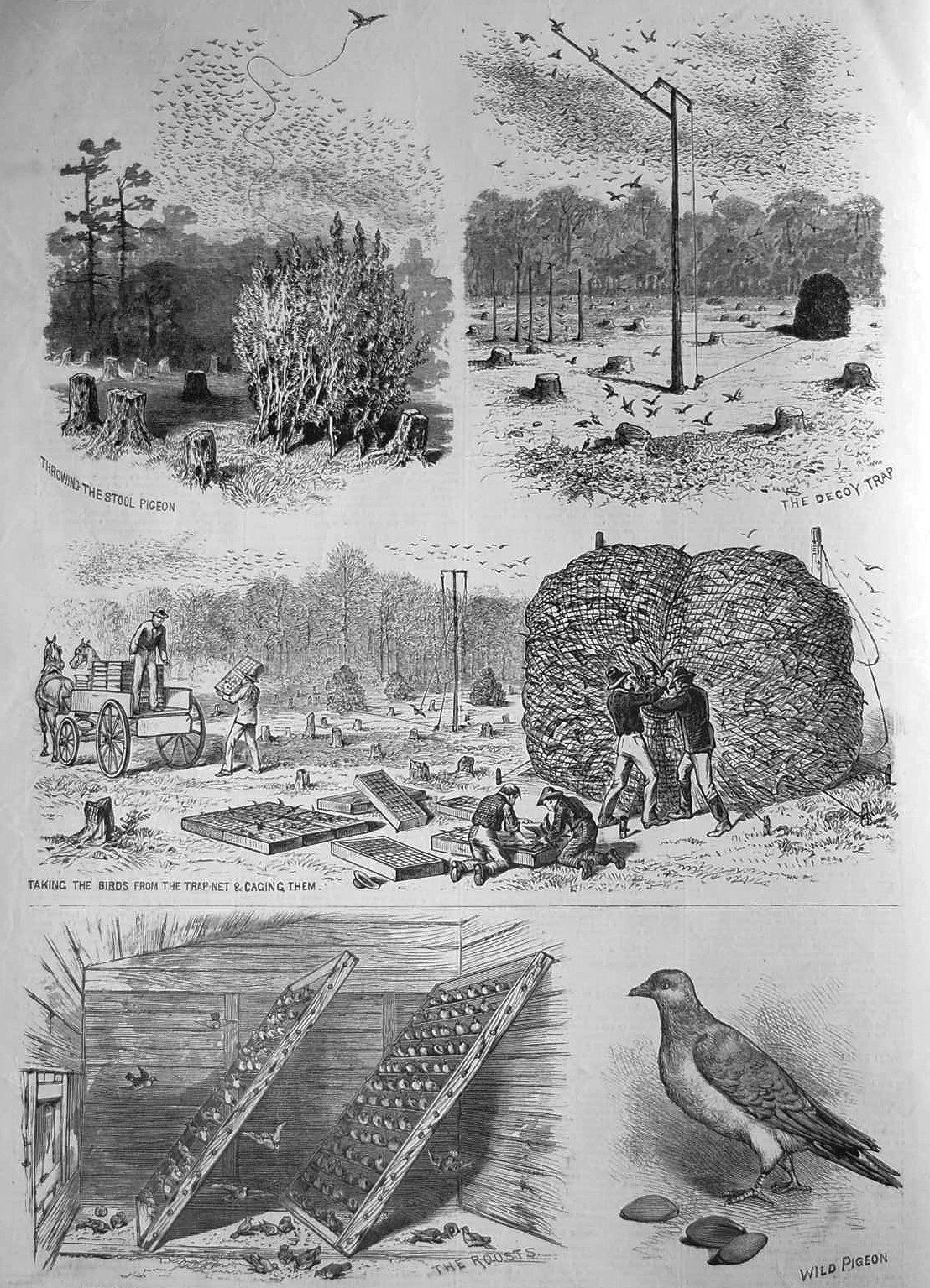
1881 spread showing methods of trapping pigeons for shooting contests

What may be the earliest account of Europeans hunting passenger pigeons dates to January 1565, when the French explorer René Laudonnière wrote of killing close to 10,000 of them around Fort Caroline in a matter of weeks:

There came to us a manna of wood pigeons in such great numbers, that over a span of about seven weeks, each day we killed more than two hundred with arquebuses in the woods around our fort.

This amounted to about one passenger pigeon per day for each person in the fort.

After European colonization, the passenger pigeon was hunted with more intensive methods than the more sustainable methods practiced by the natives. The passenger pigeon was of particular value on the frontier, and some settlements counted on its meat to support their population. The flavor of the flesh of passenger pigeons varied depending on how they were prepared. In general, juveniles were thought to taste the best, followed by birds fattened in captivity and birds caught in September and October. It was common practice to fatten trapped pigeons before eating them or storing their bodies for winter. Dead pigeons were commonly stored by salting or pickling the bodies; other times, only the breasts of the pigeons were kept, in which case they were typically smoked. In the early 19th century, commercial hunters began netting and shooting the birds to sell as food in city markets, and even as pig fodder. Once pigeon meat became popular, commercial hunting started on a prodigious scale.

Passenger pigeons were shot with such ease that many did not consider them to be a game bird, as an amateur hunter could easily bring down six with one shotgun blast; a particularly good shot with both barrels of a shotgun at a roost could kill 61 birds. The birds were frequently shot either in flight during migration or immediately after, when they commonly perched in dead, exposed trees. Hunters only had to shoot toward the sky without aiming, and many pigeons would be brought down. The pigeons proved difficult to shoot head-on, so hunters typically waited for the flocks to pass overhead before shooting them. Trenches were sometimes dug and filled with grain so that a hunter could shoot the pigeons along this trench. Hunters largely outnumbered trappers, and hunting passenger pigeons was a popular sport for young boys. In 1871, a single seller of ammunition provided three tons of powder and 16 tons (32,000 lb) of shot during a nesting. In the latter half of the 19th century, thousands of passenger pigeons were captured for use in the sports shooting industry. The pigeons were used as living targets in shooting tournaments, such as "trap-shooting", the controlled release of birds from special traps. Competitions could also consist of people standing regularly spaced while trying to shoot down as many birds as possible in a passing flock. The pigeon was considered so numerous that 30,000 birds had to be killed to claim the prize in one competition.

Pigeon net in Canada, by James Pattison Cockburn, 1829

Humans used a wide variety of other methods to capture and kill passenger pigeons. Nets were propped up to allow passenger pigeons entry, and then closed by knocking loose the stick that supported the opening, trapping twenty or more pigeons inside. Tunnel nets were also used to great effect, and one particularly large net was capable of catching 3,500 pigeons at a time. These nets were used by many farmers on their own property as well as by professional trappers. Food would be placed on the ground near the nets to attract the pigeons. Decoy or "stool pigeons" (sometimes blinded by having their eyelids sewn together) were tied to a stool. When a flock of pigeons passed by, a cord would be pulled that made the stool pigeon flutter to the ground, making it seem as if it had found food, and the flock would be lured into the trap. Salt was also frequently used as bait, and many trappers set up near salt springs. At least one trapper used alcohol-soaked grain as bait to intoxicate the birds and make them easier to kill. Another method of capture was to hunt at a nesting colony, particularly during the period of a few days after the adult pigeons abandoned their nestlings, but before the nestlings could fly. Some hunters used sticks to poke the nestlings out of the nest, while others shot the bottom of a nest with a blunt arrow to dislodge the pigeon. Others cut down a nesting tree in such a way that when it fell, it would also hit a second nesting tree and dislodge the pigeons within. In one case, 6 km^{2} (1,500 acres) of large trees were speedily cut down to get birds, and such methods were common. A severe method was to set fire to the base of a tree nested with pigeons; the adults would flee and the juveniles would fall to the ground. Sulfur was sometimes burned beneath the nesting tree to suffocate the birds, which fell out of the tree in a weakened state.

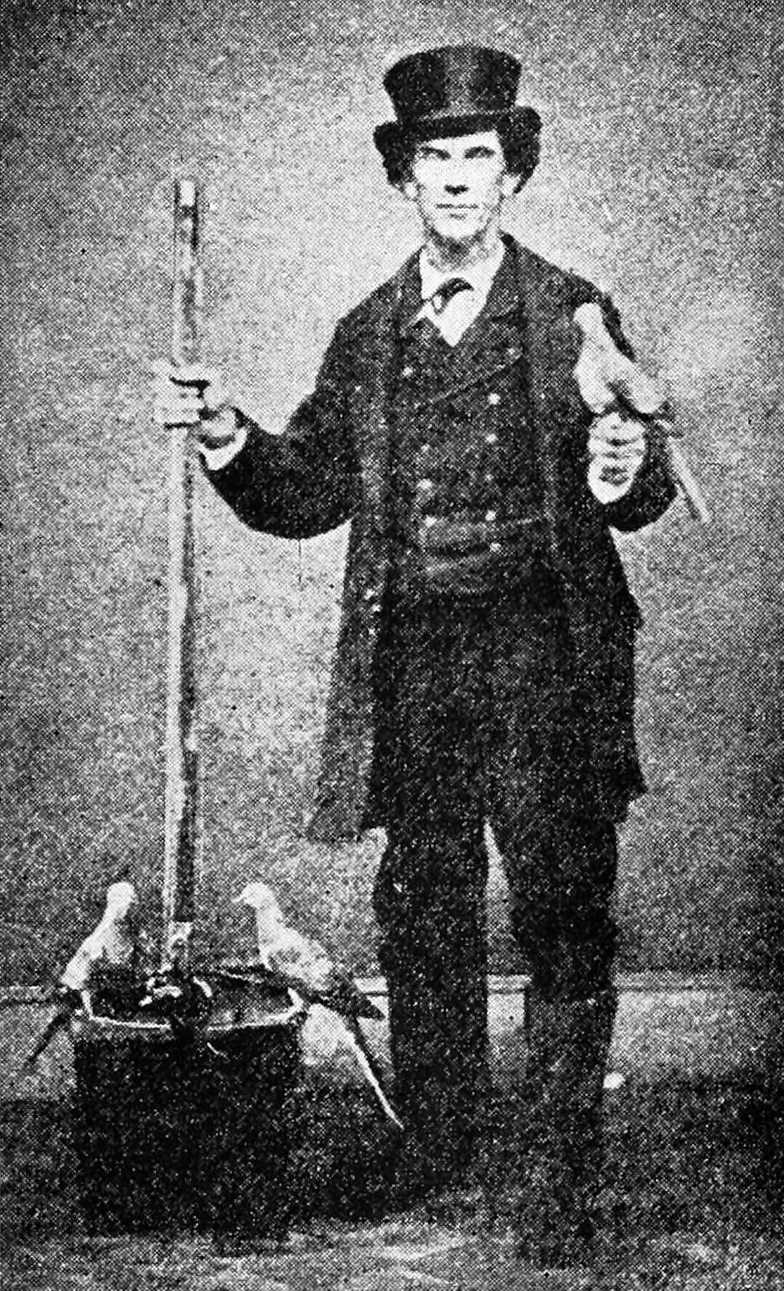
Trapper Albert Cooper with blind decoy pigeons for luring wild birds, c. 1870

By the mid-19th century, railroads had opened new opportunities for pigeon hunters. While it was once extremely difficult to ship masses of pigeons to eastern cities, railway access permitted pigeon hunting to become commercialized. An extensive telegraph system was introduced in the 1860s, which improved communication across the United States, making it easier to spread information about the whereabouts of pigeon flocks. After being opened up to the railroads, the town of Plattsburgh, New York, is estimated to have shipped 1.8 million pigeons to larger cities in 1851 alone at a price of 31 to 56 cents a dozen. By the late 19th century, the trade of passenger pigeons had become commercialized. Large commission houses employed trappers (known as "pigeoners") to follow the flocks of pigeons year-round. A single hunter is reported to have sent three million birds to eastern cities during his career. In 1874, at least 600 people were employed as pigeon trappers, a number which grew to 1,200 by 1881. Pigeons were caught in such numbers that by 1876, shipments of dead pigeons were unable to recoup the costs of the barrels and ice needed to ship them. The price of a barrel full of pigeons dropped to below fifty cents, due to overstocked markets. Passenger pigeons were instead kept alive so their meat would be fresh when killed, and sold once their market value had increased. Thousands of birds were kept in large pens, though the bad conditions led many to die from lack of food and water, and by fretting (gnawing) themselves; many rotted away before they could be sold.

Hunting of passenger pigeons was documented and depicted in contemporaneous newspapers, wherein various trapping methods and uses were featured. The most often reproduced of these illustrations was captioned "Winter sports in northern Louisiana: shooting wild pigeons", and published in 1875. Passenger pigeons were also seen as agricultural pests, because feeding flocks could destroy entire crops. The bird was described as a "perfect scourge" by some farming communities, and hunters were employed to "wage warfare" on the birds to save grain, as shown in another newspaper illustration from 1867 captioned as "Shooting wild pigeons in Iowa". When comparing these "pests" to the bison of the Great Plains, the valuable resource needed was not the species of animals but the agriculture which was consumed by said animal. The crops that were eaten were seen as marketable calories, proteins, and nutrients all grown for the wrong species.

=== Decline and conservation attempts ===
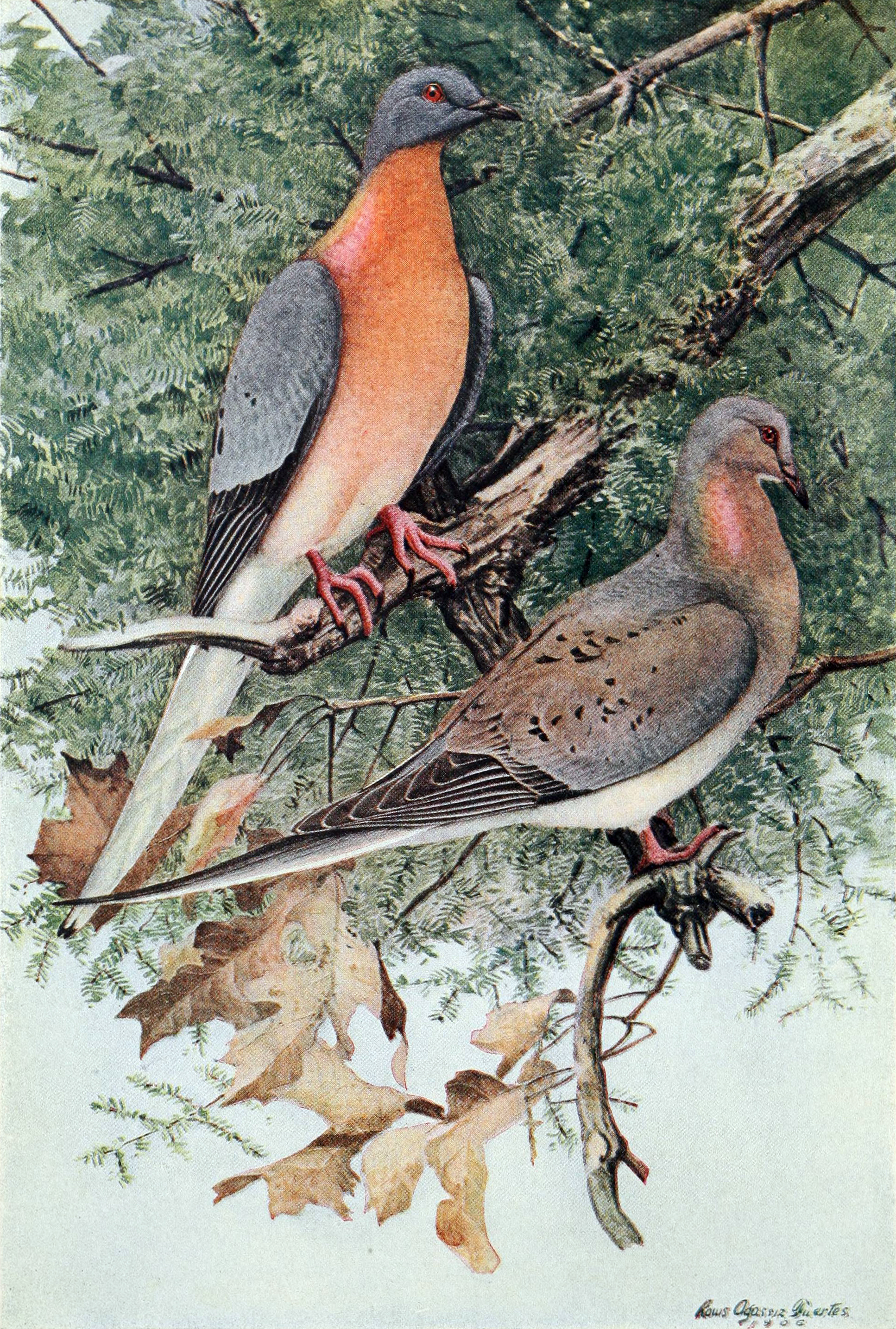
Male and female by Louis Agassiz Fuertes, frontispiece of William Butts Mershon's 1907 The Passenger Pigeon

The notion that the species could be driven to extinction was alien to the early colonists, because the number of birds did not appear to diminish, and also because the concept of extinction was yet to be defined. The bird seems to have been slowly pushed westward after the arrival of Europeans, becoming scarce or absent in the east, though there were still millions of birds in the 1850s. The population must have been decreasing in numbers for many years, though this went unnoticed due to the apparent vast number of birds, which clouded their decline. In 1856 Bénédict Henry Révoil may have been one of the first writers to voice concern about the fate of the passenger pigeon, after witnessing a hunt in 1847:

Everything leads to the belief that the pigeons, which cannot endure isolation and are forced to flee or to change their way of living according to the rate at which North America is populated by the European inflow, will simply end by disappearing from this continent, and, if the world does not end this before a century, I will wager ... that the amateur of ornithology will find no more wild pigeons, except those in the Museums of Natural History.

By the 1870s, the decrease in birds was noticeable, especially after the last large-scale nestings and subsequent slaughters of millions of birds in 1874 and 1878. By this time, large nestings only took place in the north, around the Great Lakes. The last large nesting was in Petoskey, Michigan, in 1878 (following one in Pennsylvania a few days earlier), where 50,000 birds were killed each day for nearly five months. The surviving adults attempted a second nesting at new sites, but were killed by professional hunters before they had a chance to raise any young. Scattered nestings were reported into the 1880s, but the birds were now wary, and commonly abandoned their nests if persecuted.

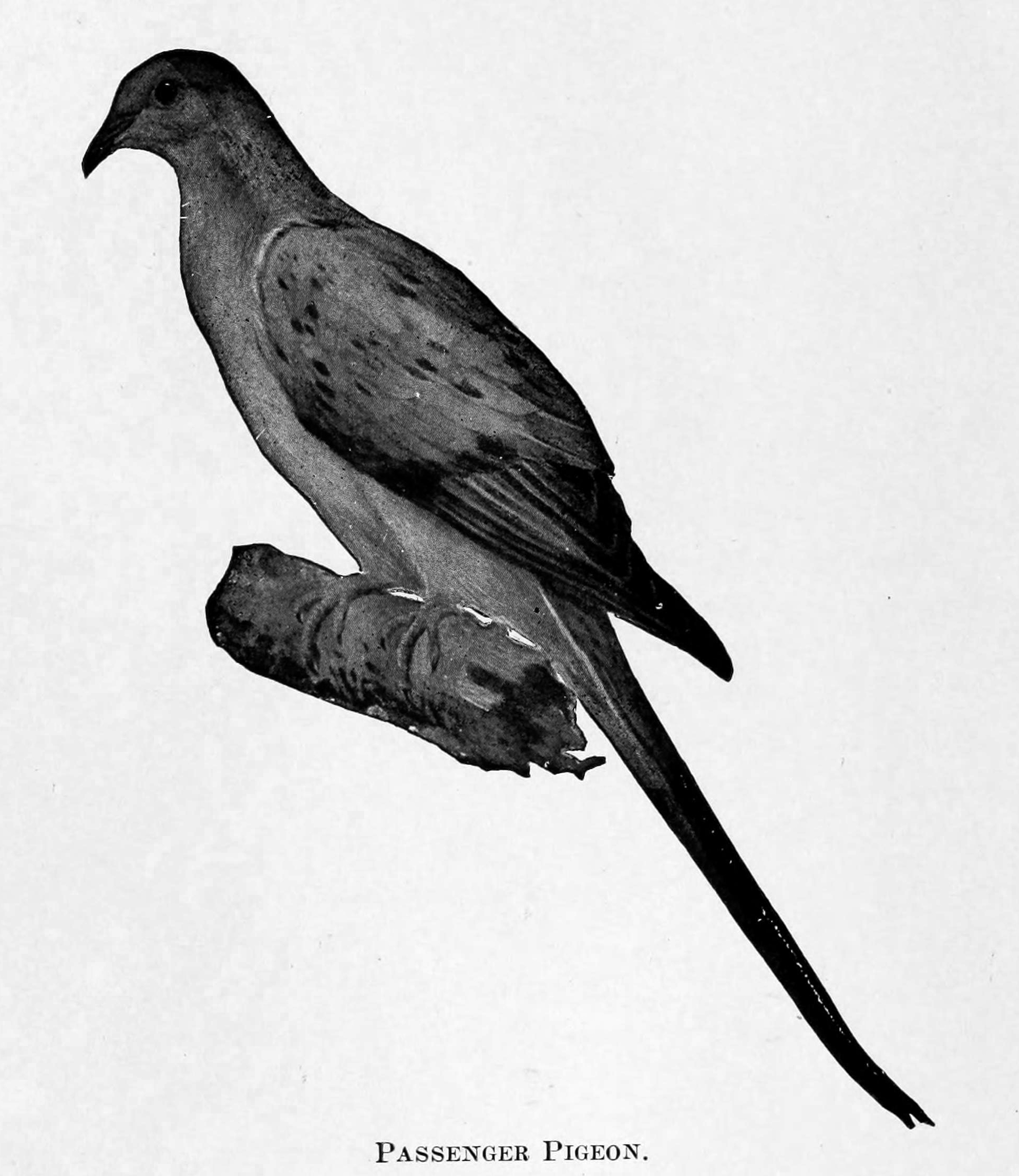
Life drawing by Charles R. Knight, 1903

By the time of these last nestings, laws had already been enacted to protect the passenger pigeon, but these proved ineffective, as they were unclearly framed and hard to enforce. H. B. Roney, who witnessed the Petoskey slaughter, led campaigns to protect the pigeon, but was met with resistance, and accusations that he was exaggerating the severity of the situation. Few offenders were prosecuted, mainly some poor trappers, but the large enterprises were not affected. In 1857, a bill was brought forth to the Ohio State Legislature seeking protection for the passenger pigeon, yet a Select Committee of the Senate filed a report stating that the bird did not need protection, being "wonderfully prolific", and dismissing the suggestion that the species could be destroyed. Public protests against trap-shooting erupted in the 1870s, as the birds were badly treated before and after such contests. Conservationists were ineffective in stopping the slaughter. A bill was passed in the Michigan legislature making it illegal to net pigeons within 3 km (1.9 mi) of a nesting area. In 1897, a bill was introduced in the Michigan legislature asking for a 10-year closed season on passenger pigeons. Similar legal measures were passed and then disregarded in Pennsylvania. The gestures proved futile and, by the mid-1890s, the passenger pigeon had almost completely disappeared, and was probably extinct as a breeding bird in the wild. Small flocks are known to have existed at this point, since large numbers of birds were still being sold at markets. Thereafter, only small groups or individual birds were reported, many of which were shot on sight.

=== Last survivors ===
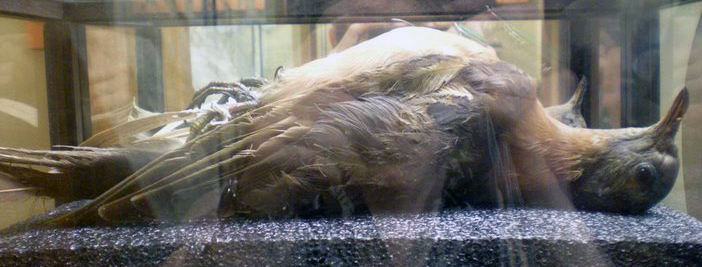
"Buttons", one of the last confirmed wild passenger pigeons, Cincinnati Zoo

The last recorded nest and egg in the wild were collected in 1895 near Minneapolis. The last wild individual in Louisiana was discovered among a flock of mourning doves in 1896, and subsequently shot. Many late sightings are thought to be false or due to confusion with mourning doves. The last fully authenticated record of a wild passenger pigeon was near Oakford, Illinois, on March 12, 1901, when a male bird was killed, stuffed, and placed in Millikin University in Decatur, Illinois, where it remains today. This was not discovered until 2014, when writer Joel Greenberg found out the date of the bird's shooting while doing research for his book A Feathered River Across the Sky. Greenberg also pointed out a record of a male shot near Laurel, Indiana, on April 3, 1902, that was stuffed but later destroyed.

For many years, the last confirmed wild passenger pigeon was thought to have been shot near Sargents, Pike County, Ohio on March 24, 1900, when a boy named Press Clay Southworth killed a female bird with a BB gun. The boy did not recognize the bird as a passenger pigeon, but his parents identified it, and sent it to a taxidermist. The specimen, nicknamed "Buttons" due to the buttons used instead of glass eyes, was donated to the Ohio Historical Society by the family in 1915. The reliability of accounts after the Ohio, Illinois, and Indiana birds are in question. Ornithologist Alexander Wetmore claimed that he saw a pair flying near Independence, Kansas, in April 1905. On May 18, 1907, U.S. President Theodore Roosevelt claimed to have seen a "flock of about a dozen two or three times on the wing" while on retreat at his cabin in Pine Knot, Virginia, and that they lit on a dead tree "in such a characteristically pigeon-like attitude"; this sighting was corroborated by a local gentleman whom he had "rambled around with in the woods a good deal" and whom he found to be "a singularly close observer." In 1910, the American Ornithologists' Union offered a reward of $3,000 for discovering a nest— equivalent to $103,661 in 2025.

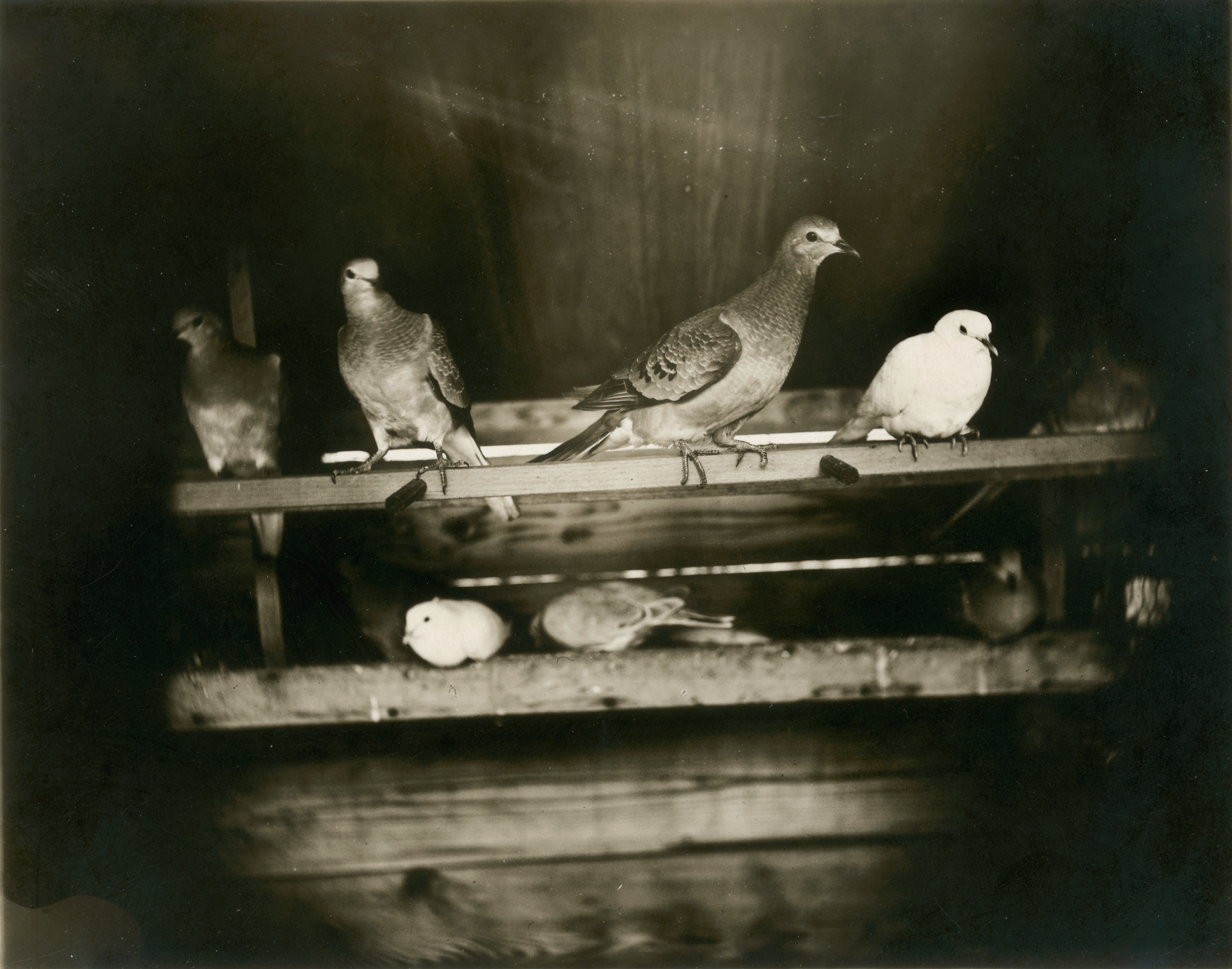
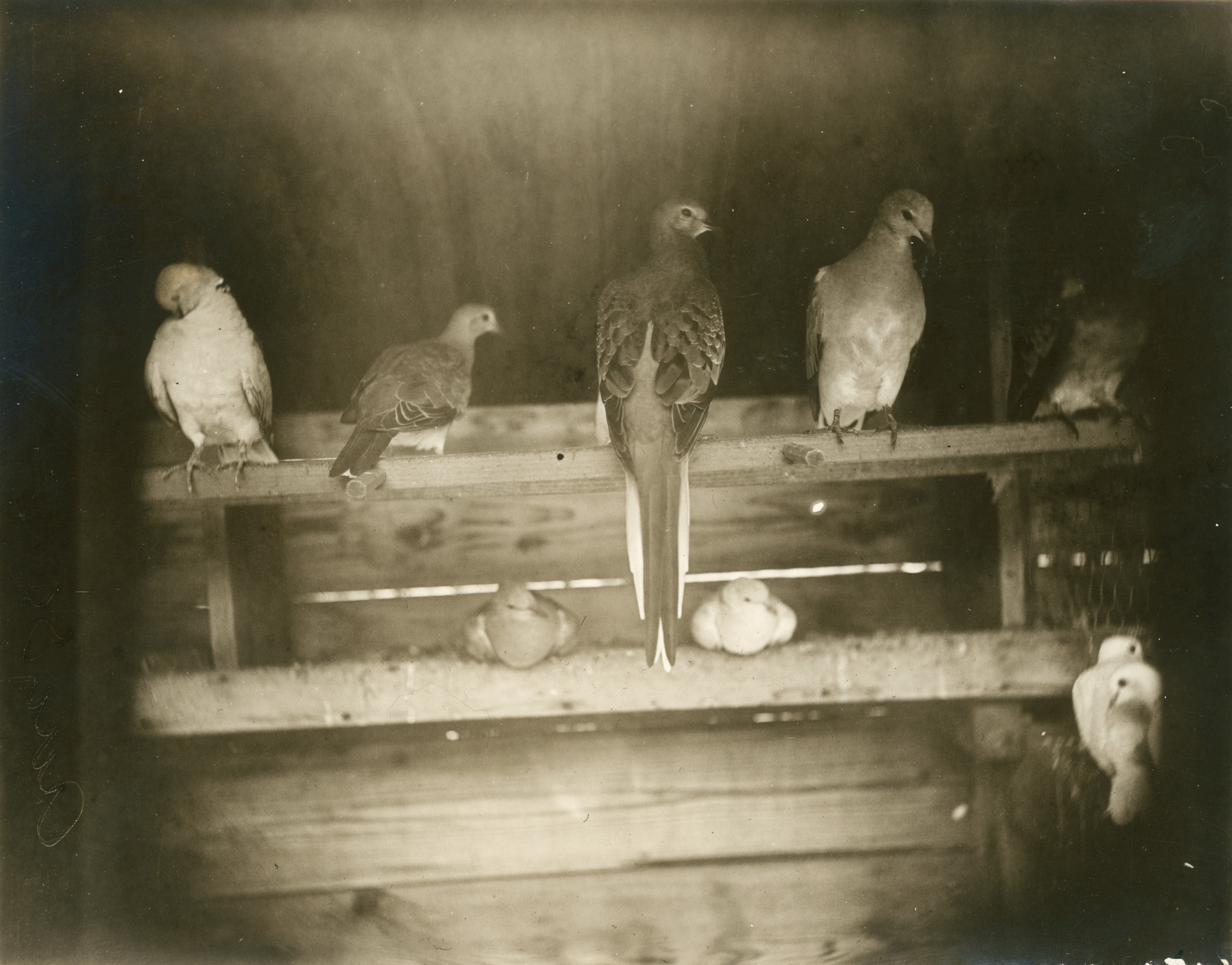
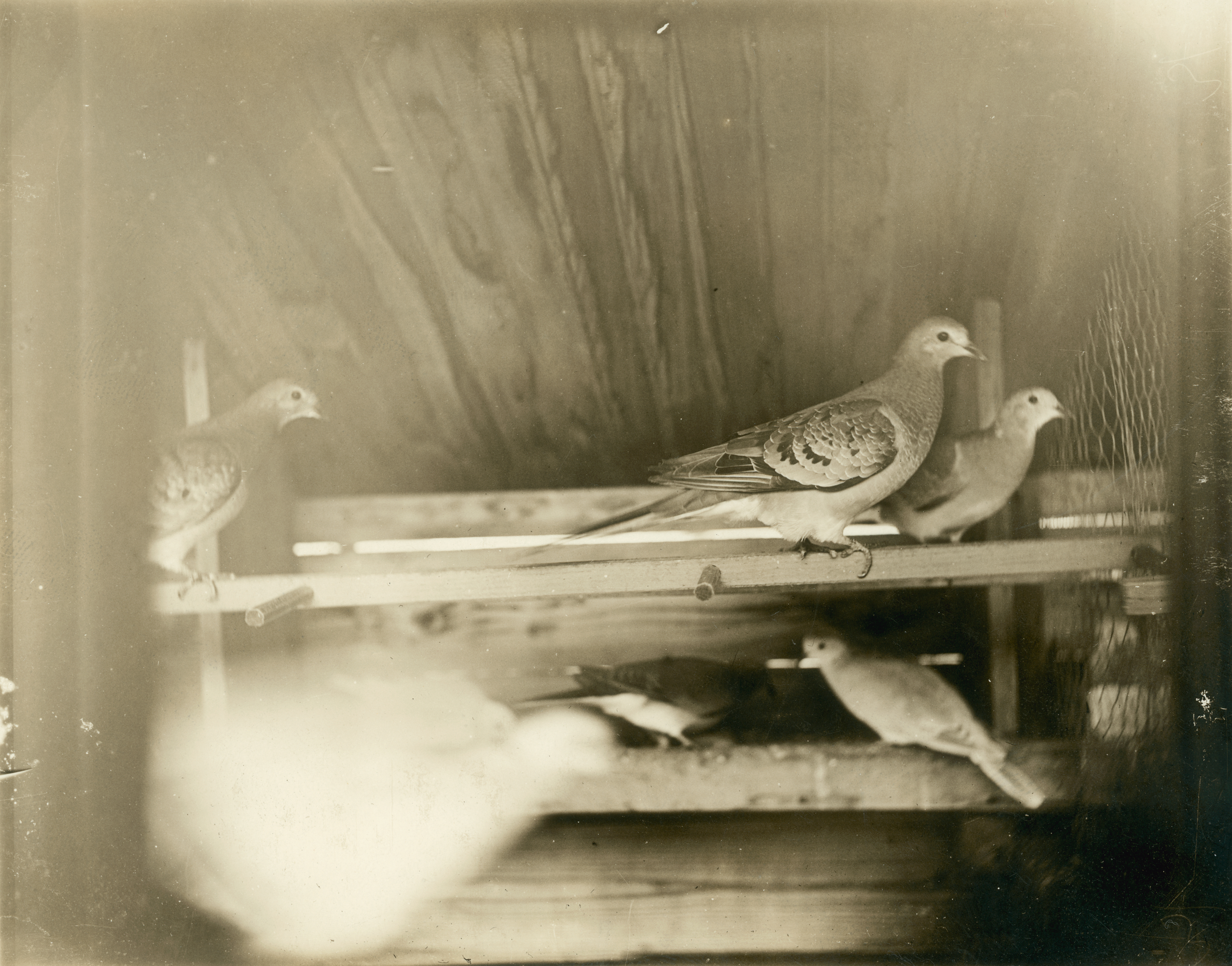
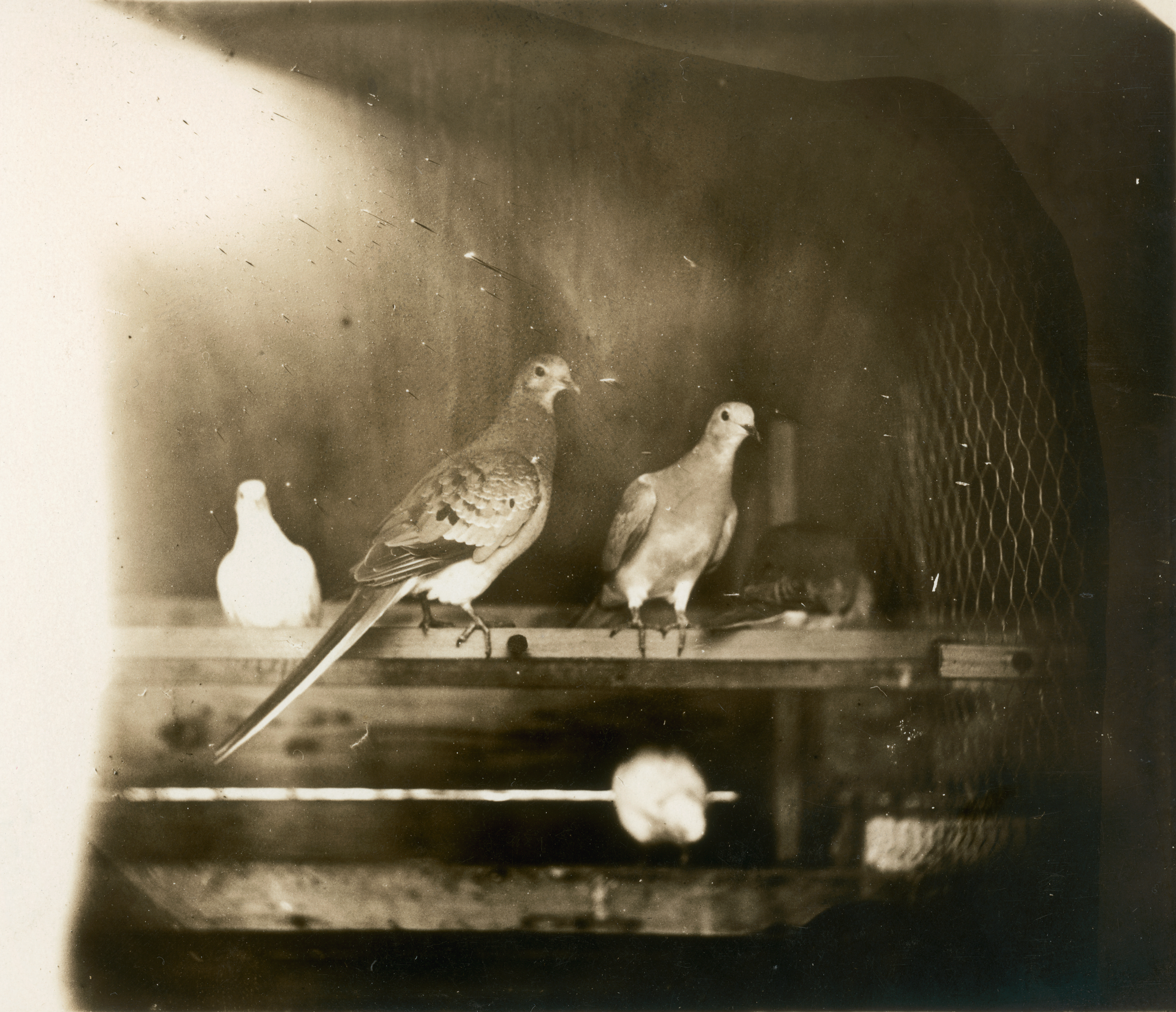
Whitman's aviary with passenger pigeons and other pigeon species, 1896/98

Most captive passenger pigeons were kept for exploitative purposes, but some were housed in zoos and aviaries. Audubon alone claimed to have brought 350 birds to England in 1830, distributing them among various noblemen, and the species is also known to have been kept at London Zoo. Being common birds, these attracted little interest, until the species became rare in the 1890s. By the turn of the 20th century, the last known captive passenger pigeons were divided in three groups; one in Milwaukee, one in Chicago, and one in Cincinnati. There are claims of a few further individuals having been kept in various places, but these accounts are not considered reliable today. The Milwaukee group was kept by David Whittaker, who began his collection in 1888, and possessed fifteen birds some years later, all descended from a single pair.

The Chicago group was kept by Charles Otis Whitman, whose collection began with passenger pigeons bought from Whittaker beginning in 1896. He had an interest in studying pigeons, and kept his passenger pigeons with other pigeon species. Whitman brought his pigeons with him from Chicago to Massachusetts by railcar each summer. By 1897, Whitman had bought all of Whittaker's birds, and upon reaching a maximum of 19 individuals, he gave seven back to Whittaker in 1898. Around this time, a series of photographs were taken of these birds; 24 of the photos survive. Some of these images have been reproduced in various media, copies of which are now kept at the Wisconsin Historical Society. It is unclear exactly where, when, and by whom these photos were taken, but some appear to have been taken in Chicago in 1896, others in Massachusetts in 1898, the latter by a J. G. Hubbard. By 1902, Whitman owned sixteen birds. His pigeons laid many eggs, but few hatched, and many hatchlings died. A newspaper inquiry was published that requested "fresh blood" to the flock which had now ceased breeding. By 1907, he was down to two female passenger pigeons that died that winter, and was left with two infertile male hybrids, whose subsequent fate is unknown. By this time, only four (all males) of the birds Whitman returned to Whittaker were alive, and these died between November 1908 and February 1909.

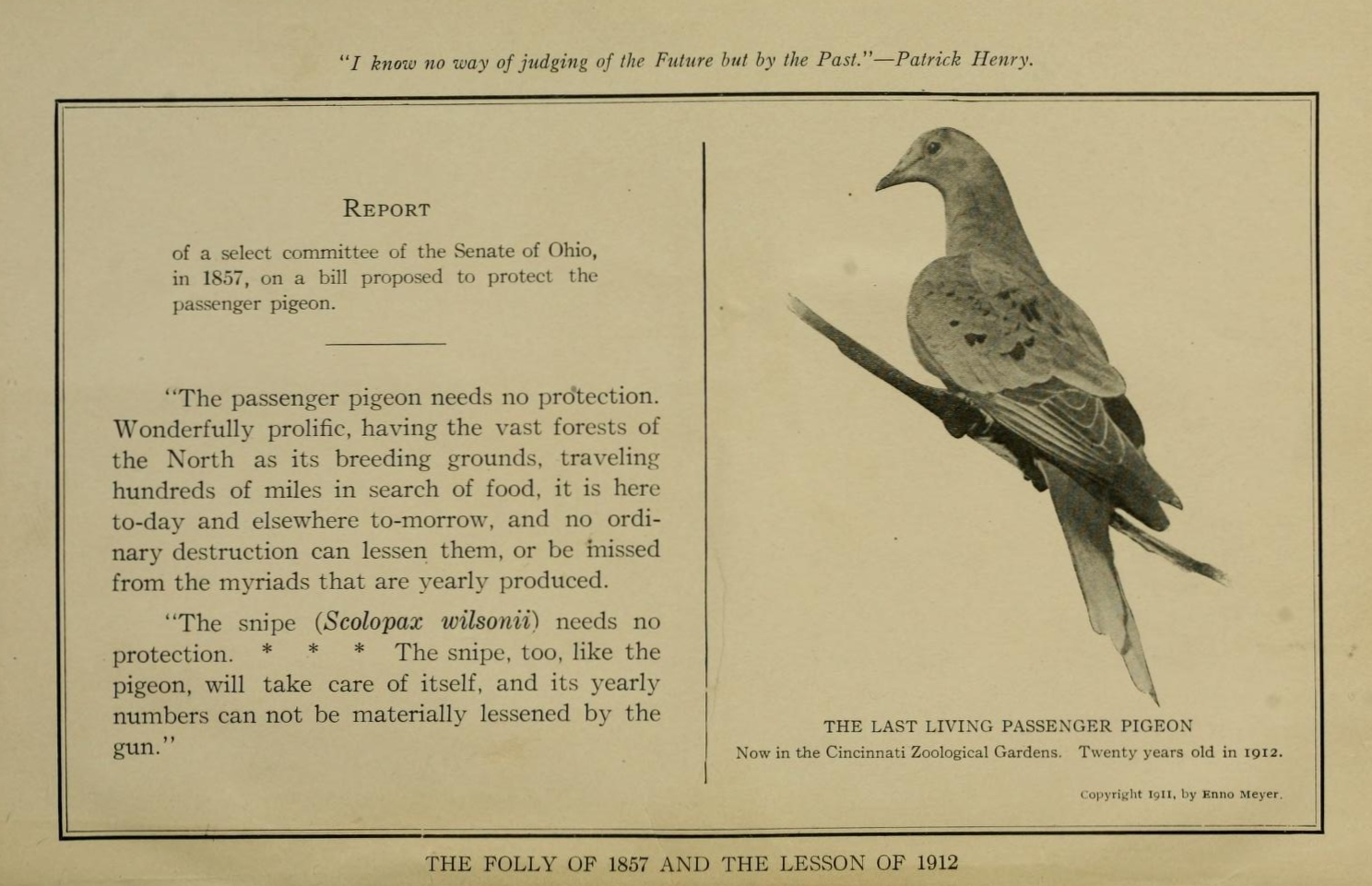
"The Folly of 1857 and the Lesson of 1912", frontispiece to William T. Hornaday's Our vanishing wild life (1913), showing Martha in life, the endling of the species.

The Cincinnati Zoo, one of the oldest zoos in the United States, kept passenger pigeons from its beginning in 1875. The zoo kept more than twenty individuals in a ten-by-twelve-foot (3.0 by 3.7 m) cage. Passenger pigeons do not appear to have been kept at the zoo due to their rarity, but to enable guests to have a closer look at a native species. Recognizing the decline of the wild populations, Whitman and the Cincinnati Zoo consistently strove to breed the surviving birds, including attempts at making a rock dove foster passenger pigeon eggs. In 1902, Whitman gave a female passenger pigeon to the zoo; this was possibly the individual later known as Martha, which would become the last living member of the species. Other sources argue that Martha was hatched at the Cincinnati Zoo, lived there for 25 years, and was the descendant of three pairs of passenger pigeons purchased by the zoo in 1877. It is thought this individual was named Martha because her last cage mate was named George, thereby honoring George Washington and his wife Martha, though it has also been claimed she was named after the mother of a zookeeper's friends.

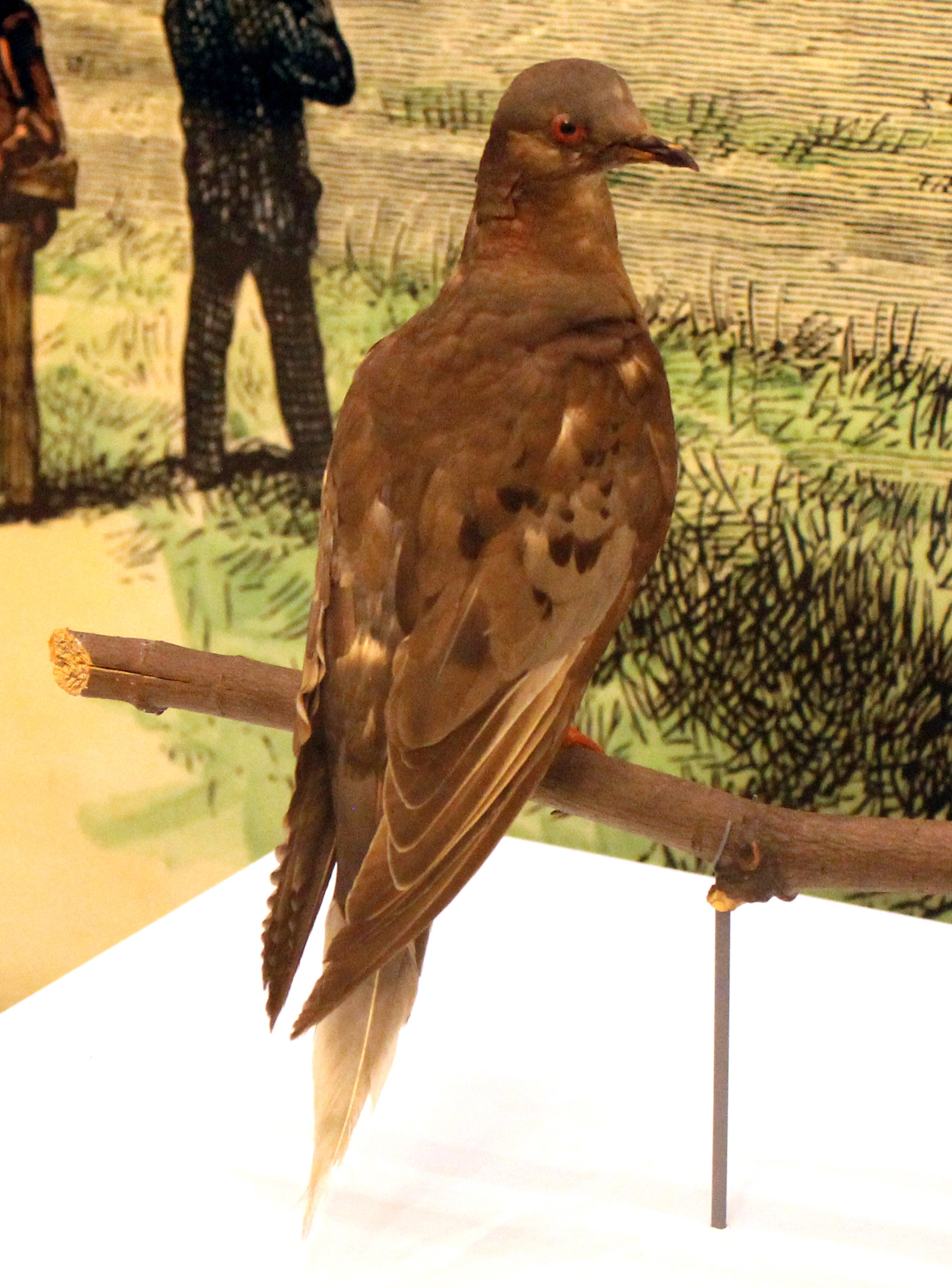
Martha at the Smithsonian Museum, 2015

In 1909, Martha and her two male companions at the Cincinnati Zoo became the only known surviving passenger pigeons. One of these males died around April that year, followed by George, the remaining male, on July 10, 1910. It is unknown whether the remains of George were preserved. Martha soon became a celebrity due to her status as an endling, and offers of a $1,000 reward (equivalent to $35,833 in 2025) for finding a mate for her brought even more visitors to see her. During her last four years in solitude (her cage was 5.4 by 6 m (18 by 20 ft)), Martha became steadily slower and more immobile; visitors would throw sand at her to make her move, and her cage was roped off in response. Martha died of old age on September 1, 1914, and was found lifeless on the floor of her cage. It was claimed that she died at 1 p.m., but other sources suggest she died some hours later. Depending on the source, Martha was between 17 and 29 years old at the time of her death, although 29 is the generally accepted figure. At the time, it was suggested that Martha might have died from an apoplectic stroke, as she had suffered one a few weeks before dying. Her body was frozen into a block of ice and sent to the Smithsonian Institution in Washington, where it was skinned, dissected, photographed, and mounted. As she was molting when she died, she proved difficult to stuff, and previously shed feathers were added to the skin. Martha was on display for many years, but after a period in the museum vaults, she was put back on display at the Smithsonian's National Museum of Natural History in 2015. A memorial statue of Martha stands on the grounds of the Cincinnati Zoo, in front of the "Passenger Pigeon Memorial Hut", formerly the aviary wherein Martha lived, now a National Historic Landmark. Incidentally, the last specimen of the extinct Carolina parakeet, named "Incas," died later in Martha's cage on February 21, 1918; the stuffed remains of that bird are also exhibited in the "Memorial Hut".

=== Extinction causes ===
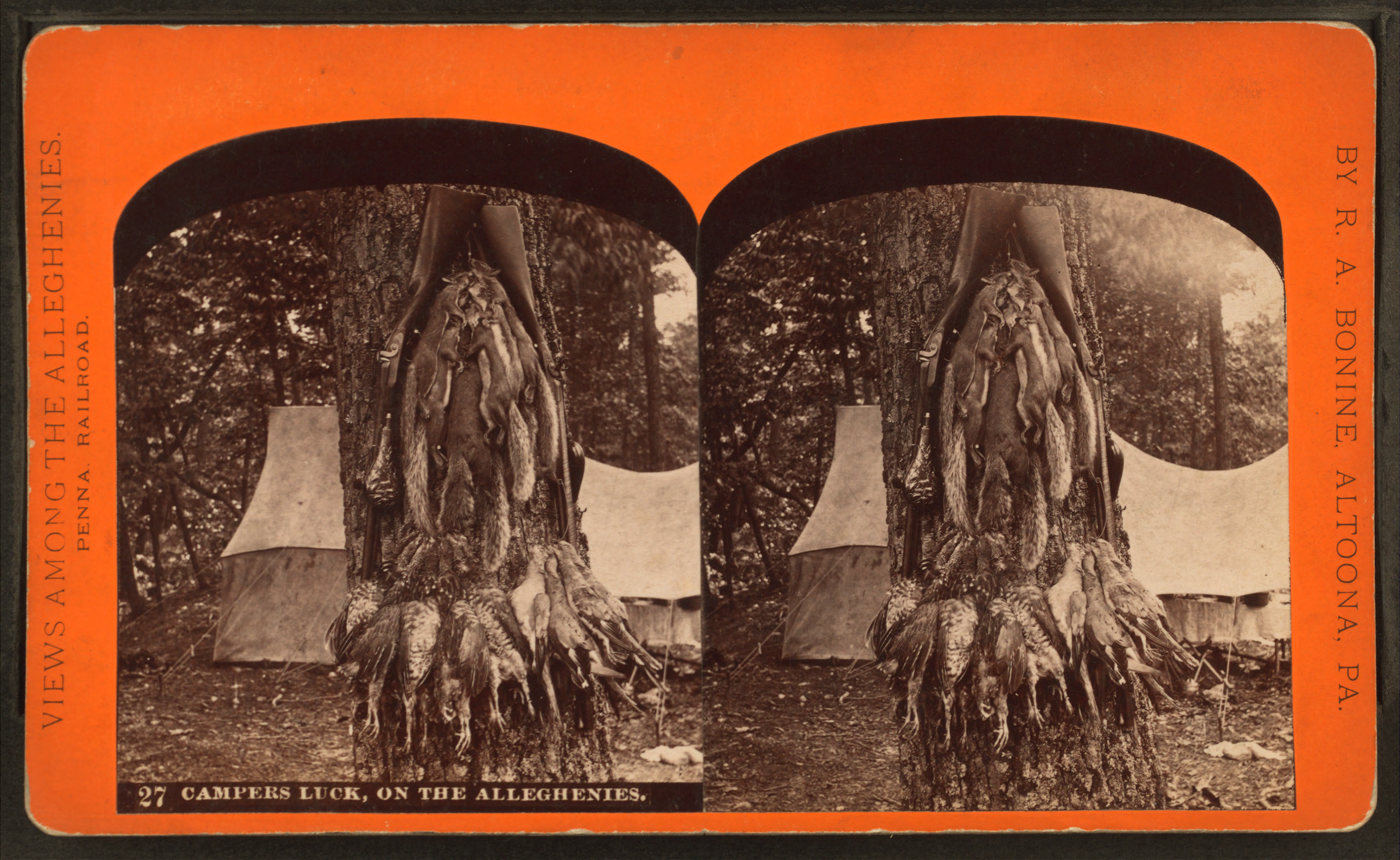
Hunted animals in the Allegheny Mountains including passenger pigeons at the lower right, late 1800s

The main reasons for the extinction of the passenger pigeon were the massive scale of hunting, the rapid loss of habitat, and the extremely social lifestyle of the bird, which made it highly vulnerable to the former factors. Deforestation was driven by the development of land for agriculture, expanding towns, and lumber harvesting. About 728,000 km^{2} (180 million acres) were cleared for farming between 1850 and 1910. Though there are still large woodland areas in eastern North America, which support a variety of wildlife, it was not enough to support the vast number of passenger pigeons needed to sustain the population. In contrast, very small populations of nearly extinct birds, such as the kākāpō (Strigops habroptilus) and the takahē (Porphyrio hochstetteri), have been enough to keep those species extant to the present. The combined effects of intense hunting and deforestation has been referred to as a "Blitzkrieg" against the passenger pigeon, and it has been labeled one of the greatest and most senseless human-induced extinctions in history. As the flocks dwindled in size, the passenger pigeon population decreased below the threshold necessary to propagate the species, an example of the Allee effect.

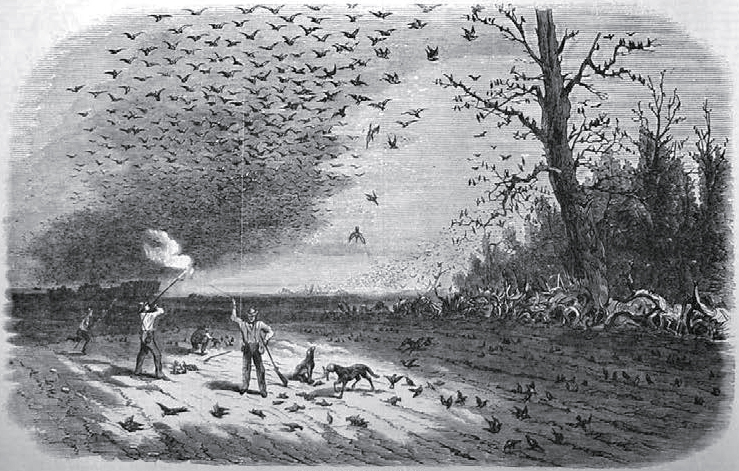
Pigeons being shot to save crops in Iowa, 1867

The 2014 genetic study that found natural fluctuations in population numbers prior to human arrival also concluded that the species routinely recovered from lows in the population, and suggested that one of these lows may have coincided with the intensified hunting by humans in the 1800s, a combination which would have led to the rapid extinction of the species. A similar scenario may also explain the rapid extinction of the Rocky Mountain locust (Melanoplus spretus) during the same period. It has also been suggested that after the population was thinned out, it would be harder for few or solitary birds to locate suitable feeding areas. In addition to the birds killed or driven away by hunting during breeding seasons, many nestlings were also orphaned before being able to fend for themselves. Other, less convincing contributing factors have been suggested at times, including mass drownings, Newcastle disease, and migrations to areas outside their original range.

The extinction of the passenger pigeon aroused public interest in the conservation movement, and resulted in new laws and practices which prevented many other species from becoming extinct. The rapid decline of the passenger pigeon has influenced later assessment methods of the extinction risk of endangered animal populations. The International Union for Conservation of Nature (IUCN) has used the passenger pigeon as an example in cases where a species was declared "at risk" for extinction even though population numbers are high.

Naturalist Aldo Leopold paid tribute to the vanished species in a monument dedication held by the Wisconsin Society for Ornithology at Wyalusing State Park, Wisconsin, which had been one of the species' social roost sites. Speaking on May 11, 1947, Leopold remarked:

Men still live who, in their youth, remember pigeons. Trees still live who, in their youth, were shaken by a living wind. But a decade hence only the oldest oaks will remember, and at long last only the hills will know.

=== Potential resurrection of the species ===
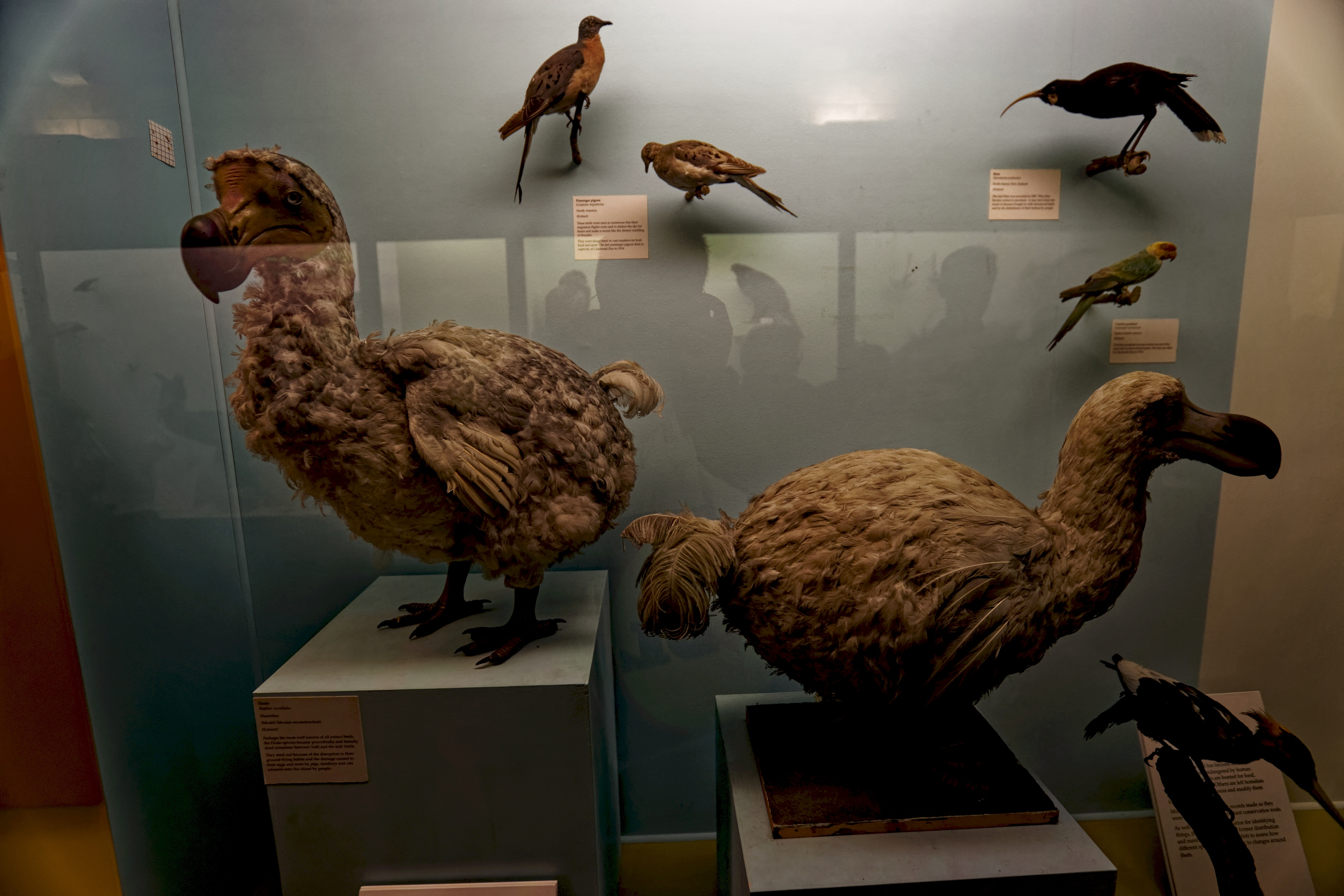
Passenger pigeons (above) exhibited alongside other recently extinct birds, Natural History Museum, London

Today, at least 1,532 passenger pigeon skins (along with 16 skeletons) still exist, spread across many institutions all over the world. It has been suggested that the passenger pigeon should be revived when available technology allows it (a concept which has been termed "de-extinction"), using genetic material from such specimens. In 2003, the Pyrenean ibex (Capra pyrenaica pyrenaica, a subspecies of the Iberian ibex) was the first extinct animal to be cloned back to life; the clone lived for only seven minutes before dying of lung defects. A hindrance to cloning the passenger pigeon is the fact that the DNA of museum specimens has been contaminated and fragmented, due to exposure to heat and oxygen. American geneticist George M. Church has proposed that the passenger pigeon genome can be reconstructed by piecing together DNA fragments from different specimens. The next step would be to splice these genes into the stem cells of rock pigeons (or band-tailed pigeons), which would then be transformed into egg and sperm cells, and placed into the eggs of rock pigeons, resulting in rock pigeons bearing passenger pigeon sperm and eggs. The offspring of these would have passenger pigeon traits, and would be further bred to favor unique features of the extinct species. The American non-profit organization Revive & Restore is currently pursuing the idea.

The general idea of re-creating extinct species has been criticized, since the large funds needed could be spent on conserving currently threatened species and habitats, and because conservation efforts might be viewed as less urgent. In the case of the passenger pigeon, since it was very social, it is unlikely that enough birds could be created for revival to be successful, and it is unclear whether there is enough appropriate habitat left for its reintroduction. Furthermore, the parent pigeons that would raise the cloned passenger pigeons would belong to a different species, with a different way of rearing young.
