= Speckled garden eel =

Speckled garden eel can refer to two species of fishes:

- Gorgasia galzini (Galzin's garden eel) – West and Central Pacific
- Heteroconger pellegrini (Mimic garden eel) – East Pacific
