= Heteroconger fugax =

Scientific classification
- Kingdom: Animalia
- Phylum: Chordata
- Class: Actinopterygii
- Order: Anguilliformes
- Family: Congridae
- Genus: Heteroconger
- Species: H. fugax

Binomial name
- Heteroconger fugax Koeda, Fujii & Motomura, 2018

Species of garden eel

Heteroconger fugax, also known as the shy garden eel, is a species of garden eel belonging to the family Congridae. It is native to the northwestern Pacific Ocean. It is very slender and has a ground-creamy body color with many small white spots numbering around 200.

== Distribution ==
This species is widely distributed across the northwestern Pacific Ocean. It can be found in the Ryukyu Archipelago of Japan, the Philippine islands, and Borneo in Southeast Asia. It can be found in found in benthic marine environments from 10-32 meters in depth. The type locality of this species is Amami-oshima island.

== Description ==
It is most similar to the species Heteroconger tomberua in that it has remarkably slender body with numerous small spots and a vertebral count close to 200. However it can be distinguished from H. tomberua with the presence of a large distinct white blotch on the opercle and more numerous, dense spots over the entire head. Its body is a ground color with a uniform cream and microscopic melanophores.
