= Heteroconger obscurus =

Conservation status
- Least Concern (IUCN 3.1)

Scientific classification
- Kingdom: Animalia
- Phylum: Chordata
- Class: Actinopterygii
- Order: Anguilliformes
- Family: Congridae
- Genus: Heteroconger
- Species: H. obscurus

Binomial name
- Heteroconger obscurus (Klausewitz & Eibl-Eibesfeldt, 1959)

Synonyms
- Xarifania obscura Klausewitz & Eibl-Eibesfeldt, 1959

Species of fish

Heteroconger obscurus, the obscure garden eel, is an eel in the family Congridae (conger/garden eels). It was described by Wolfgang Klausewitz and Irenäus Eibl-Eibesfeldt in 1959, originally under the genus Xarifania. It is a marine, tropical eel which is known from the eastern Indian Ocean, including the Nicobar Islands in India, and Andaman Island. It is known to dwell at a maximum depth of 15 m (49 ft), and inhabits silty sediments. Males can reach a maximum total length of 33.6 cm (13.2 in; 1.10 ft).
