= Margret Schleidt =

German human ethologist (1928–2012)

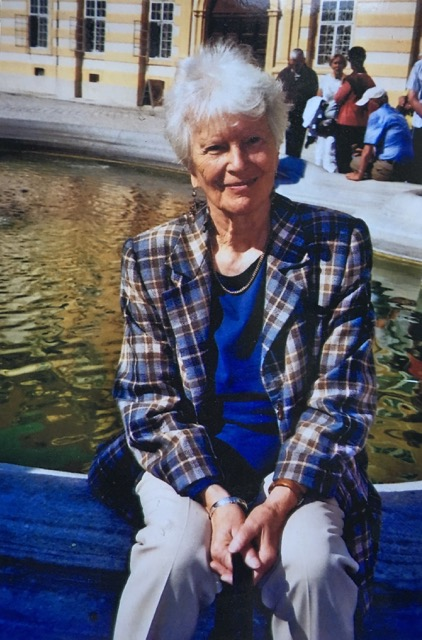

Margret Else Schleidt (born Margret Else Zimmer on July 20, 1928, in Duisburg, died March 13, 2012, in Andechs) was a German human ethologist. She worked at the Max-Planck-Institut für Verhaltensphysiologie, which has now become the Max-Planck Institute for Ornithology.

Margret Else Schleidt studied Biology at the Universities of Bonn, Zurich and Freiburg. She did her dissertation research in animal ethology at Konrad Lorenz’s research station in Buldern Westfalen. She then completed her PhD in animal ethology in 1955 under the supervision of Professor Otto Koehler in Freiburg i Br., before working as part of Konrad Lorenz’ research group at the Max-Planck-Institut für Verhaltensphysiologie in Seewiesen. At that time, she worked with Wolfgang Schleidt on ornithological projects. From 1963 to 1974, Margret Schleidt was secretary to the Lorenz group.

In 1974, she joined of the Human Ethology group led by Irenäus Eibl-Eibesfeldt in Seewiesen. Her research focus was on human communication. She wrote papers on the importance of olfaction, mother-child relationships, and rhythmic movement phenomena. Importantly, she discovered that various repeated behaviours such as stirring while cooking, scratching, and other non-repeated behaviours had a three-second rhythm, in different human cultures, as well as in chimpanzees and baboons. In addition, she advised students writing their dissertations.

In 1987, she taught human ethology at LMU Munich, and from 1990 to 2010 at the University of Innsbruck with her colleagues Gerhard Medicus and Wulf Schiefenhövel. Her research and lectures influenced the work of colleagues in her field, and she was cited by many including Konrad Lorenz, Irenäus Eibl-Eibesfeldt, Wulf Schiefenhövel and others.

== Selected publications ==
- Schleidt, M.: "Handeln und Wahrnehmen im Sekundenbereich". In: Konrad Lorenz und seine verhaltensbiologischen Konzepte aus heutiger Sicht, pp. 303–312 (Hg. Kotrschal, K.; Müller, G.; Winkler, H.). Filander, Fürth (2002)
- Lemke, Matthias R.; Koethe, Nils; Schleidt, Margret (2000). "Segmentation of Behavior and Time Structure of Movements in Depressed Patients". Psychopathology. 33 (3). S. Karger AG: 131–136. doi:10.1159/000029134. ISSN 0254-4962. PMID 10773771. S2CID 39783403.
- Schleidt, Margret; Kien, Jenny (1997). "Segmentation in behavior and what it can tell us about brain function". Human Nature. 8 (1). Springer Science and Business Media LLC: 77–111. doi:10.1007/s12110-997-1005-7. ISSN 1045-6767. PMID 26196593. S2CID 13128784.
- Medicus, G.; Schleidt, M.; Eibl-Eibesfeldt, I.: :Universelle Zeitkonstante bei Bewegungen taubblinder Kinder". Der Nervenarzt 65 (9), pp. 598–601 (1994)
- Schleidt, M.; Medicus, G.; Schiefenhövel, W.: "Humanethologie und Vorgeschichte". Praxis Geschichte 6, pp. 44–49 (1994)
- Schleidt, Margret; Genzel, Carola (1990). "The significance of mother's perfume for infants in the first weeks of their life". Ethology and Sociobiology. 11 (3). Elsevier BV: 145–154. doi:10.1016/0162-3095(90)90007-s. ISSN 0162-3095.
- Grammer, Karl; Schiefenhövel, Wulf; Schleidt, Margret; Lorenz, Beatrice; Eibl-Eibesfeldt, Irenäus (26 April 2010). "Patterns on the Face: The Eyebrow Flash in Crosscultural Comparison". Ethology. 77 (4). Wiley: 279–299. doi:10.1111/j.1439-0310.1988.tb00211.x. ISSN 0179-1613.
- Schleidt, M.; Eibl-Eibesfeldt, I.; Pöppel, E. (1987). "A universal constant in temporal segmentation of human short-term behavior". Naturwissenschaften. 74 (6). Springer Science and Business Media LLC: 289–290. Bibcode:1987NW.....74..289S. doi:10.1007/bf00366417. ISSN 0028-1042. PMID 3627279. S2CID 8006352.
- Schleidt, Margret; Hold, Barbara; Attili, Grazia (1981). "A cross-cultural study on the attitude towards personal odors". Journal of Chemical Ecology. 7 (1). Springer Science and Business Media LLC: 19–31. Bibcode:1981JCEco...7...19S. doi:10.1007/bf00988632. ISSN 0098-0331. PMID 24420424. S2CID 10771011.
- Schleidt, M.: Personal odor and nonverbal-communication. Ethology and Sociobiology 1 (3), pp. 225–231 (1980) (doi: 10.1016/0162-3095(80)90009-6)
- Hold, Barbara; Schleidt, Margret (26 April 2010). "The Importance of Human Odour in Non-verbal Communication". Zeitschrift für Tierpsychologie. 43 (3). Wiley: 225–238. doi:10.1111/j.1439-0310.1977.tb00072.x. ISSN 0044-3573. PMID 868320.
- Magg, Monica; Schleidt, Wolfgang M.; Schleidt, Margret (1960). "Störung Der Mutter-Kind-Beziehung Bei Truthühnern Durch Gehörverlust 1)". Behaviour. 16 (3–4). Brill: 254–260. doi:10.1163/156853960x00179. ISSN 0005-7959.
- Schleidt, Margret (26 April 2010). "Untersuchungen über die Auslösung des Kollerns beim Truthahn: (Meleagris gallopavo)". Zeitschrift für Tierpsychologie. 11 (3). Wiley: 417–435. doi:10.1111/j.1439-0310.1954.tb02166.x. ISSN 0044-3573.
