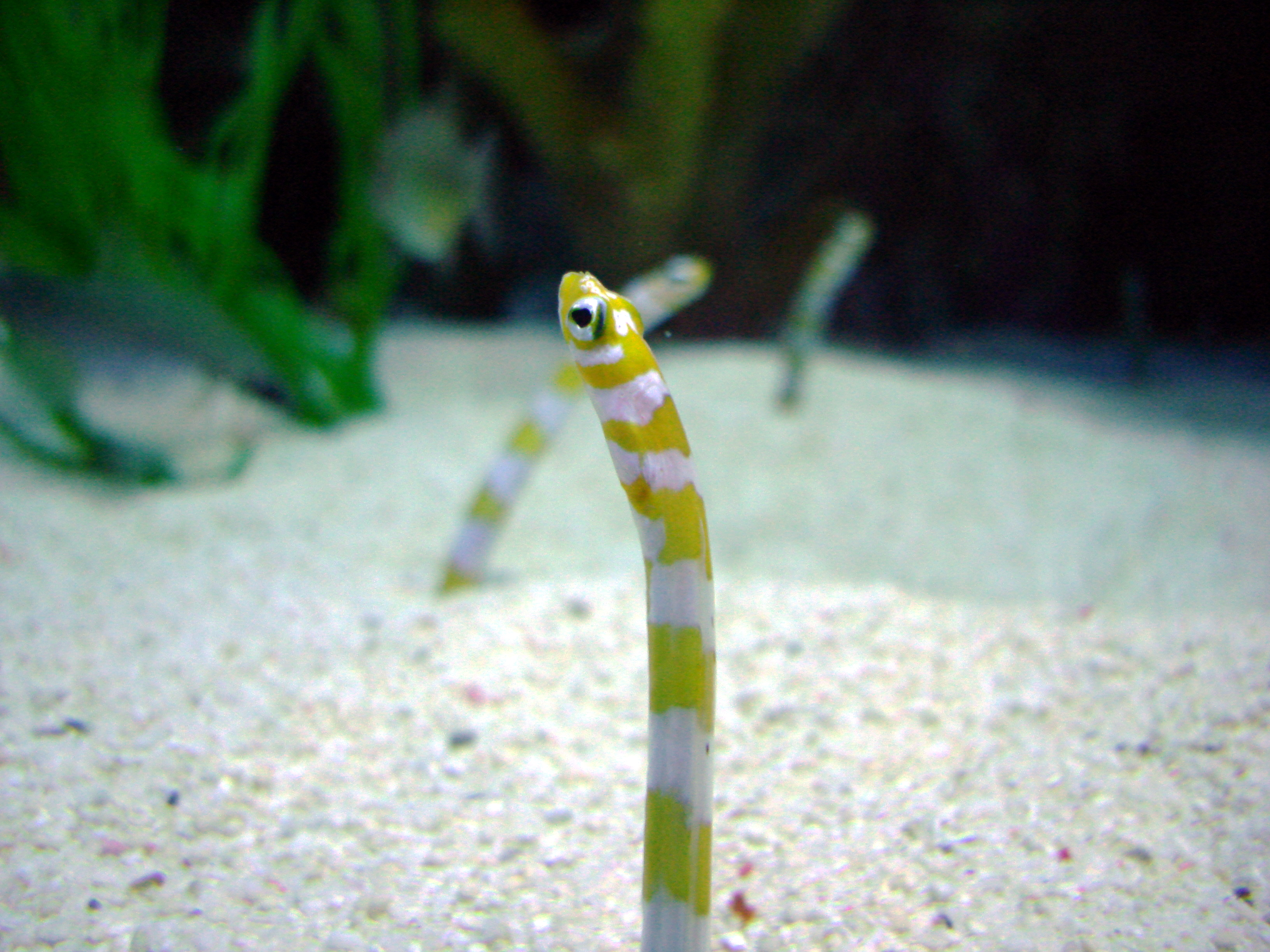
- Gorgasia preclara

Scientific classification
- Kingdom: Animalia
- Phylum: Chordata
- Class: Actinopterygii
- Division: Teleostei
- Order: Anguilliformes
- Family: Congridae
- Subfamily: Heterocongrinae
- Genus: Gorgasia; Meek & Hildebrand, 1923

Type species
- Gorgasia punctata Meek & Hildebrand, 1923

Species
- See text.

= Gorgasia =

Genus of fishes

Gorgasia is one of the two genera that belong to the subfamily Heterocongrinae (common name: garden eels). This genus is classified by the behavioral pattern of burrowing 75% of their bodies in the sandy substrate they live in and protruding their upper body into the water current above, giving the appearance that they are planted into the ground (origin of common name). This protruding behavior serves a multipurpose functionality to their survival.

The first function serves as a method of collection of their prey. Most members of this genus prey on zooplankton floating in the passing current, while some species (i.e. G. hawaiiensis) will prey on small fish eggs. The second function of the burrowing behavior allows for avoidance of predation. Whenever in the presence of a predator, most commonly the Pacific snake eel (Ophichthus triserialis), garden eels will retreat back into their burrows and hide. Similarly, during the night hours (non-light hours) when zooplankton populations are low, these eels will return to their burrows and cap them off while they sleep.

Other key characteristics of this genus includes colonial living species, sometimes with a density of up to 40 individuals in a meter-by-meter territory, as well as a metamorphosis stage between the egg stage and adulthood. Colonial living aides in evasion of predators and plays a vital role in their sexual reproduction.

== Species ==
There are 14 species that make up the genus Gorgasia. Each species is diverse in morphological patterning, hosting flat, spotted, freckled, and banded colorations, while still hosting some key defining morphology such as a short snout, large lips, large eyes, dagger shaped teeth, and a single fused anal, dorsal, and caudal ray fin. These species range in length from the shortest being around 40 cm and the longest around 120 cm (47 in) and have a body cavity typically staying around 10 millimeters in diameter.

The currently recognized species in this genus are:

Species and characteristics
Species	Geographically found	Depth found (m)	Max body length (cm)	Described by	Year described
Gorgasia barnesi (Barnes' garden eel)	Western Pacific Ocean	5–20	121	B. H. Robison & Lancraft	1984
Gorgasia cotroneii	Western Indian Ocean	--	--	D'Ancona	1928
Gorgasia galzini (speckled garden eel)	South Western Pacific Ocean	17–53	53	Castle & J. E. Randall	1999
Gorgasia hawaiiensis (Hawaiian garden eel)	Central Pacific Ocean (Hawaiian Coast)	11–53	60	J. E. Randall & Chess	1980
Gorgasia inferomaculata	Eastern Atlantic Ocean	--	--	Blache	1977
Gorgasia japonica (Pacific spaghetti eel)	Western Pacific Ocean	30	100	T. Abe, Miki & M. Asai	1977
Gorgasia klausewitzi (Klausewitz's garden eel)	Indian Ocean	170–225	75	Quéro & Saldanha	1995
Gorgasia maculata (whitespotted garden eel)	Western Pacific Ocean	25–48	70	Klausewitz & Eibl-Eibesfeldt,	1959
Gorgasia naeocepaea (freckled garden eel)	Central Pacific Ocean (Hawaiian Coast)	10–24	75	J. E. Böhlke	1951
Gorgasia preclara (splendid garden eel)	Indo-Western Pacific Ocean	18–75	40	J. E. Böhlke & J. E. Randal	1981
Gorgasia punctata (dotted garden eel)	Eastern Pacific Ocean	--	50	Meek & Hildebrand	1923
Gorgasia sillneri	Red Sea / Indian Ocean	--	84	Klausewitz	1962
Gorgasia taiwanensis (sharp-nose garden eel)	Northwestern Pacific Ocean	14–22	74	K. T. Shao	1990
Gorgasia thamani	Central Pacific (Hawaiian Coast)	14–15	119	D. W. Greenfield & Niesz	2004

== Habitat and geography ==
This genus is situated near the tropics, residing in warmer waters on continental shelves, typically near coral reefs. During their life cycle, this genus will spend their larval stages in the epipelagic portion of the ocean until they become juveniles. At this time, they will swim down to the sandy substrate of the benthic zone and burrow themselves. The species belonging to this genus vary in the depths at which they are found on the continental shelf. A majority of the species are found between 10–20 meters (33–66 ft) with some being found as deep as 220 meters (720 ft).

The map to the right shows this genus is widespread across the globe with a high concentration around the Southwestern Pacific Ocean and the Indian Ocean, with other populations found in the Eastern Pacific Ocean around Latin America and the Eastern Atlantic in the Gulf of Guinea.

== Reproduction and life span ==
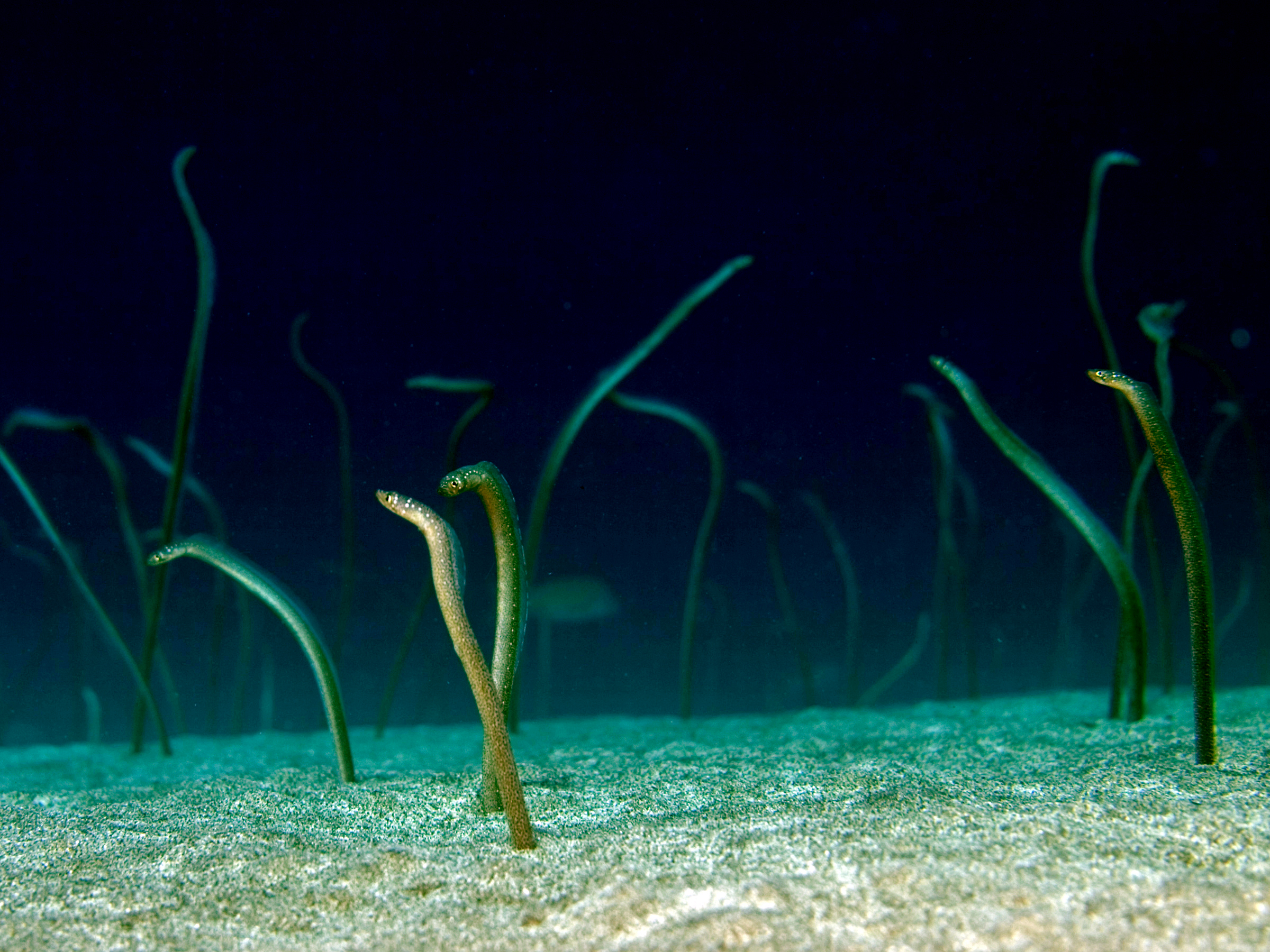
Garden eels in Bali clustering their burrows during spawning

Adults will reproduce sexually with each other. When time for breeding, adults in genus Gorgasia will increase the density of their colonial living until their burrows begin to overlap one another. Males will compete for proximity to a female's burrow, often biting at each other's body and face and in rare instances mortally wounding one another.

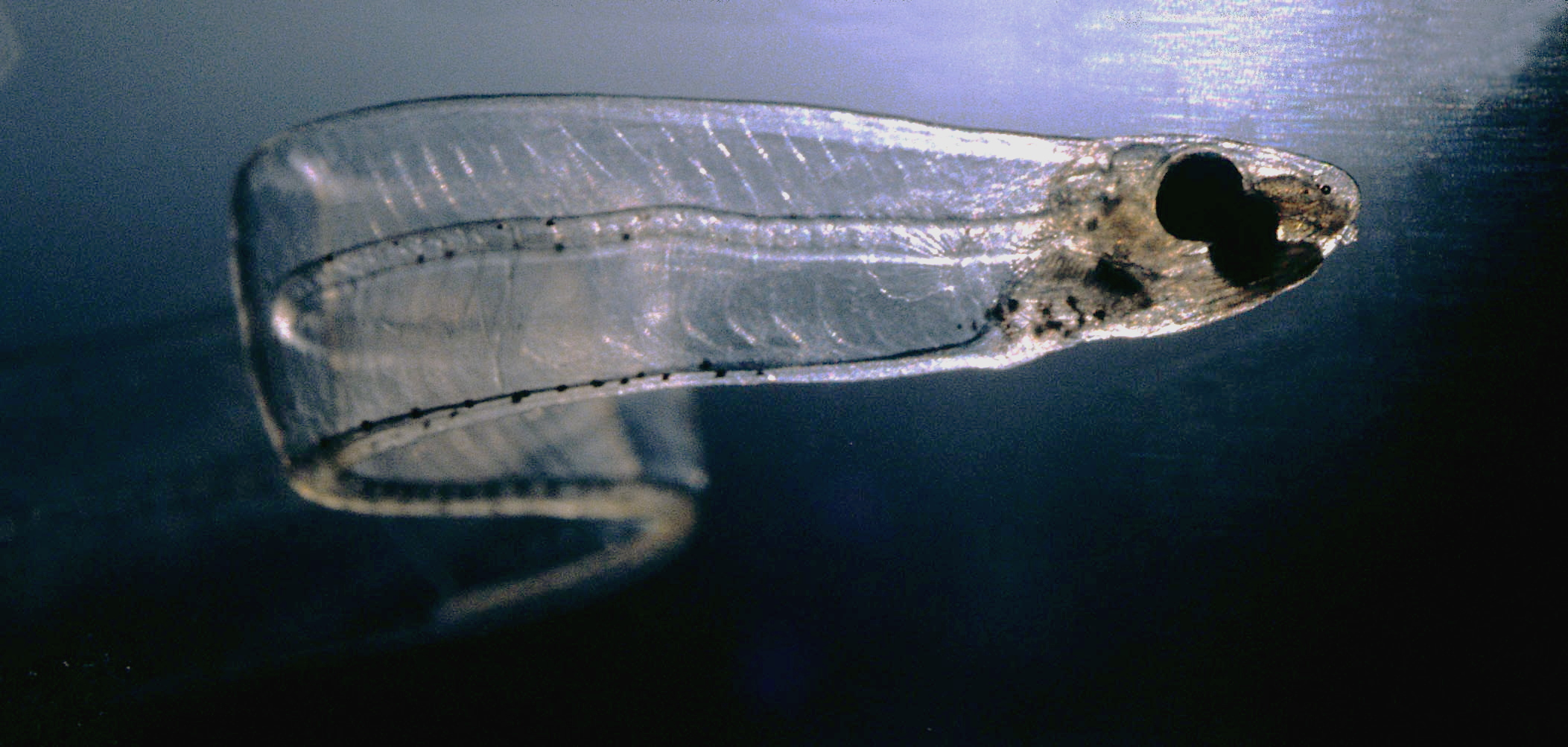
Leptocephalus form of garden eel young

Garden eels are oviparous and practice external fertilization. This means that a female will expel her eggs into the surrounding substrate and they will be fertilized by the male secreting his sperm onto them. Then, when fertilized, eggs will float to the epipelagic zone of the continental shelf where they will mature and hatch into the larval stage of development called leptocephalus. These larvae will be translucent, a camouflaging technique for the open ocean in order to avoid predation until they are able to mature more.

When almost one year of age, the juveniles will begin to form their morphological colorings and will swim to the benthic zone and build their burrows. At this point they are sexually mature and will begin the cycle over again. Although there is variability between the species of this genus, average longevity of life is estimated at 6 years of age for garden eels with the range spanning from 4 years to 10 years.
