= Whitespotted garden eel =

Conservation status
- Least Concern (IUCN 3.1)

Scientific classification
- Kingdom: Animalia
- Phylum: Chordata
- Class: Actinopterygii
- Order: Anguilliformes
- Family: Congridae
- Genus: Gorgasia
- Species: G. maculata

Binomial name
- Gorgasia maculata Klausewitz & Eibl-Eibesfeldt, 1959

Synonyms
- Gorgasia maculate Klausewitz & Eibl-Eibesfeldt, 1959; Gorgasia maculatus Klausewitz & Eibl-Eibesfeldt, 1959

Species of fish

The whitespotted garden eel (Gorgasia maculata), also known as the Indian spaghetti eel, is an eel in the family Congridae (conger/garden eels). It was described by Wolfgang Klausewitz and Irenäus Eibl-Eibesfeldt in 1959. It is a marine, tropical eel which is known from the Indo-Western Pacific, including Maldives, the Solomon Islands, the Philippines, the Cocos Islands, Comoros, India, Indonesia, and Papua New Guinea. It dwells at a depth range of 25 to 48 metres (80 to 160 ft), and lives in non-migratory colonies that form burrows on sandy slopes, usually near coral reefs. Males can reach a maximum total length of 70 centimetres (28 in).

Due to its wide range and lack of known major threats, the IUCN redlist lists the whitespotted garden eel as Least Concern.
