= Faunia =

Zoo and a botanical garden in Madrid

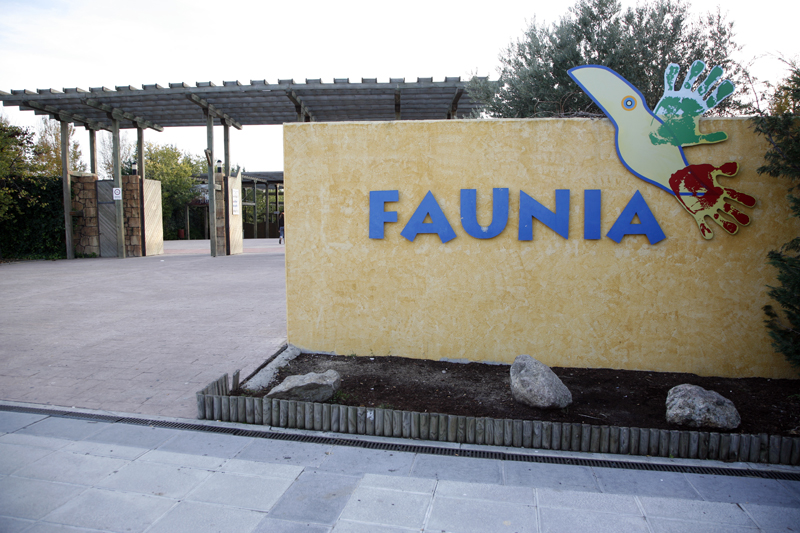
- Interactive map of Faunia
- 40.3919°N 3.6125°W
- Date opened: 10 July 2001
- Location: Madrid, Spain
- Land area: 14 hectares (35 acres)
- No. of animals: 4000
- No. of species: 500
- Memberships: EAZA, AIZA
- Major exhibits: Sea lions, Exotic pets
- Owner: Parques Reunidos

Faunia is a zoo and a botanical garden located in Madrid, Spain. It covers about fourteen square hectares and is organized into areas representing different ecosystems, such as jungle, polar regions, and African forest. It is owned by Parques Reunidos, SA.

Faunia was opened on July 10, 2001, under the name Parque Biológico de Madrid. In 2002, the park was renamed Faunia, a name created by the philologist and writer, Fernando Beltrán. The author of the project was Ricardo Novaro Bocco.

In 2014, Faunia received 400,867 visitors.

== Species ==
=== Invertebrates ===
==== Arachnids ====
- Mexican redknee tarantula
- Striped-knee tarantula

==== Insects ====
- Giant stick insect
- Vietnam stick insect
- Atlas moth
- Zebra butterfly
- Blue morpho butterfly

=== Fish ===
- Koi carp
- Peters' elephantnose fish
- Tetra
- Red lionfish
- Arapaima
- Seahorse
- Redtail catfish
- Four-eyed fish
- Red-bellied piranha
- Red-bellied pacu
- Ocellate river stingray
- Spotted gar
- Brown garden eel
- Blacktip reef shark
- Regal tang
- Raccoon butterflyfish
- Striated frogfish
- Domino damsel
- Barcheek unicornfish
- Yellow tang

=== Amphibians ===
- Axolotl
- African clawed frog

=== Reptiles ===
- Indian python
- Rock monitor
- Spectacled caiman
- Green iguana
- Boa constrictor
- Fiji Iguana
- Monocled cobra
- Amethystine python
- Central bearded dragon
- Nile crocodile
- Komodo dragon

=== Birds ===
- American flamingo
- Lesser flamingo
- Mallard
- White-cheeked pintail
- Chestnut teal
- Mute swan
- Black swan
- Black-necked swan
- Red-crested pochard
- Common shelduck
- Ruddy shelduck
- Emperor goose
- Mandarin duck
- Fulvous whistling duck
- Canada goose
- Barnacle goose
- Domestic goose
- Saker falcon
- Griffon vulture
- Black-chested buzzard-eagle
- Grey pelican
- Great white pelican
- Great cormorant
- Black oystercatcher
- Helmeted guineafowl
- Grey crowned crane
- Purple starling
- Cattle egret
- Black-throated magpie-jay
- European herring gull
- Grey-headed gull
- King penguin
- Chinstrap penguin
- Gentoo penguin
- Adélie penguin
- Southern rockhopper penguin
- Magellanic penguin
- Humboldt penguin
- Giant wood rail
- Chestnut-mandibled toucan
- Yellow-naped amazon
- Yellow-knobbed curassow
- Scarlet ibis
- Grey-winged trumpeter
- Toco toucan
- Sun parakeet
- Blue-and-yellow macaw
- Scarlet macaw
- Greater rhea
- Silver pheasant
- Lady Amherst's pheasant
- Common crane
- Demoiselle crane

=== Mammals ===
- Prairie dog
- Large-headed capuchin
- Guinea pig
- Domestic sheep
- Pony
- Yak
- American bison
- Mule
- Thar
- Domestic goat
- Vietnamese pig
- African wild ass
- Harbor seal
- Steller sea lion
- Brown fur seal
- Indian flying fox
- Seba's short-tailed bat
- South African springhare
- Striped skunk
- Linnaeus's two-toed sloth
- Three-striped night monkey
- Egyptian fruit bat
- Crested porcupine
- Gray mouse lemur
- Binturong
- Aardvark
- Common genet
- Short-tailed chinchilla
- Meerkat
- Ocelot
- Nine-banded armadillo
- Kinkajou
- Black-and-white ruffed lemur
- Raccoon
- White-headed lemur
- Ring-tailed lemur
- Southern tamandua
- Golden lion tamarin
- Goeldi's marmoset
- Black agouti
- White-faced saki
- Common squirrel monkey
- Desmarest's hutia
- Emperor tamarin
- Common marmoset
- Pygmy marmoset
- Naked mole-rat
- Common dwarf mongoose
- Reeves's muntjac
- Gray brocket

=== Conservation programs ===
In 2007 and 2008, Faunia participated in seven EEP and nine ESB programs coordinated by EAZA.

In 2012, 12 out of the 143 species in the collection were included in ESB programs, and another 12 in EEP programs in which the park participated. It also co-ordinates one of them, the white-headed marmoset.
