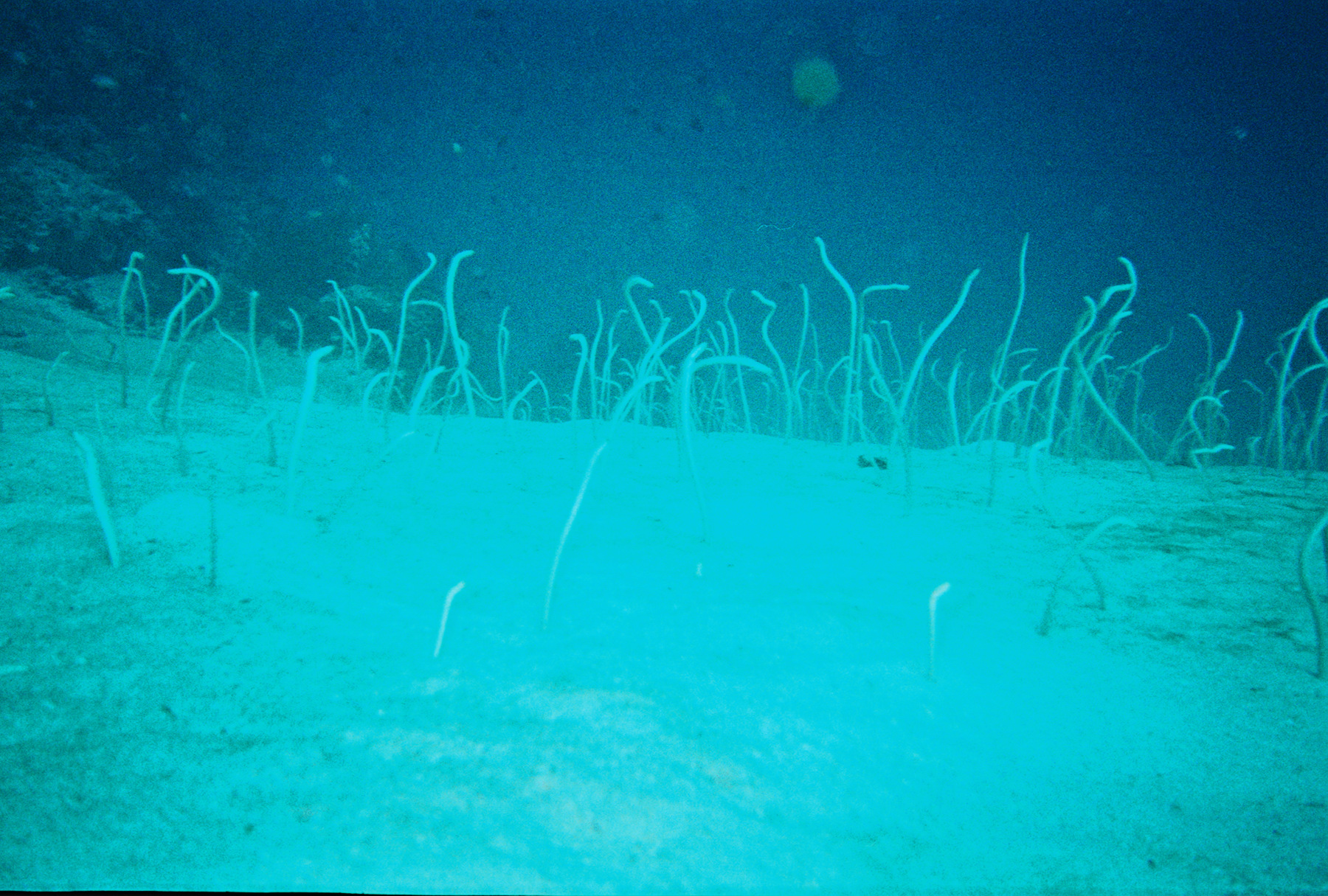

Conservation status
- Least Concern (IUCN 3.1)

Scientific classification
- Kingdom: Animalia
- Phylum: Chordata
- Class: Actinopterygii
- Division: Teleostei
- Order: Anguilliformes
- Family: Congridae
- Genus: Heteroconger
- Species: H. cobra

Binomial name
- Heteroconger cobra J. E. Böhlke & J. E. Randall, 1981

= Heteroconger cobra =

Species of fish

Heteroconger cobra, sometimes known as the cobra garden eel, is a species of garden eel of the family Congridae, found in the western Central Pacific from Honiara, the Solomon Islands to Port Moresby, Papua New Guinea.

They occur in colonies, on sloping sand bottoms. They are known to be very frightened of humans. When they are spotted, these eels dart back into the holes in which they live.
