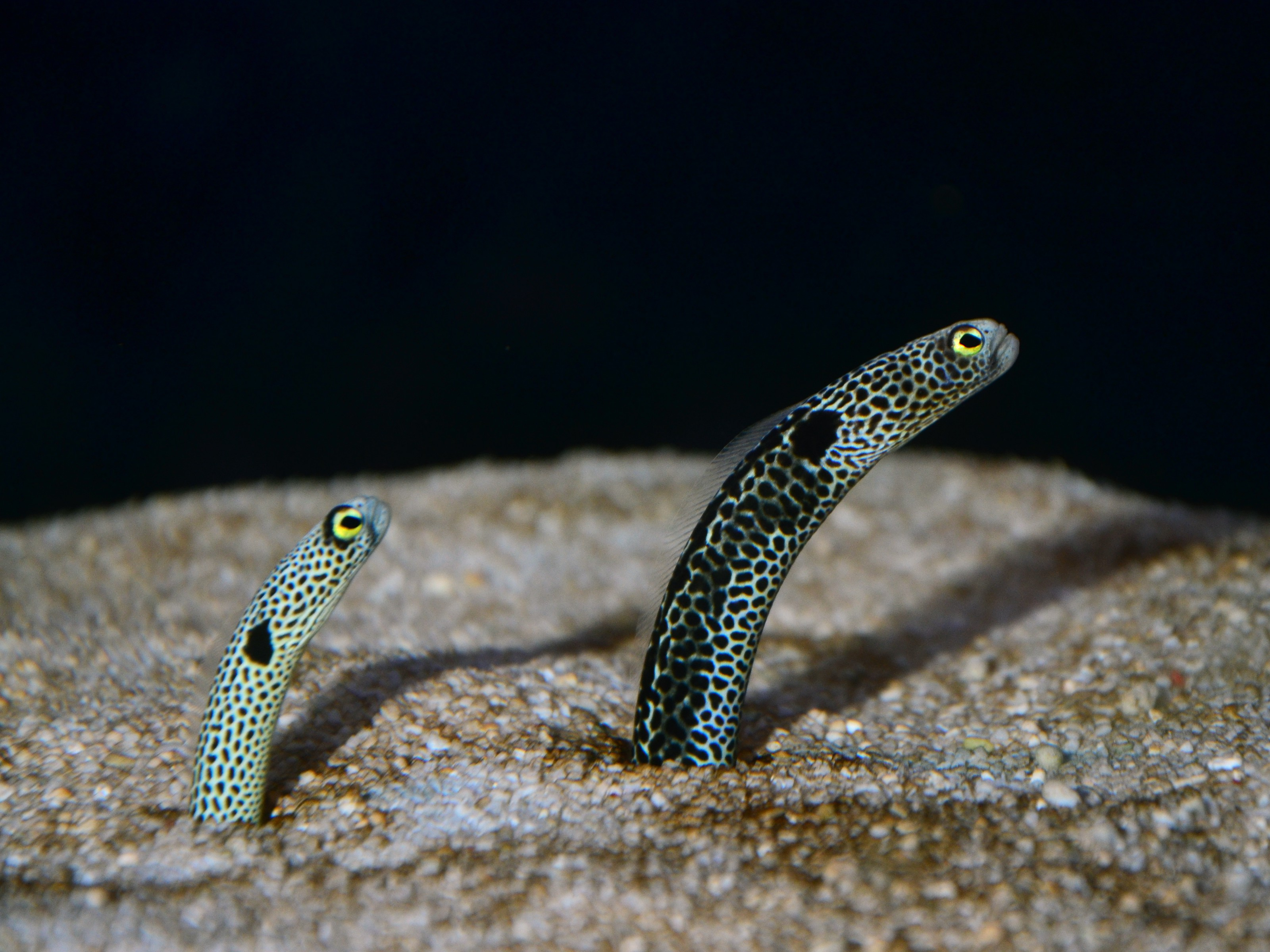

Conservation status
- Least Concern (IUCN 3.1)

Scientific classification
- Kingdom: Animalia
- Phylum: Chordata
- Class: Actinopterygii
- Division: Teleostei
- Order: Anguilliformes
- Family: Congridae
- Genus: Heteroconger
- Species: H. hassi

Binomial name
- Heteroconger hassi (Klausewitz & Eibl-Eibesfeldt, 1959)

Synonyms
- Leptocephalus maculatus Della Croce & Castle, 1966; Taenioconger haasi (Klausewitz & Eibl-Eibesfeldt, 1959) (misspelling); Taenioconger hassi (Klausewitz & Eibl-Eibesfeldt, 1959); Xarifania hassi Klausewitz & Eibl-Eibesfeldt, 1959

= Spotted garden eel =

Species of fish

The spotted garden eel (Heteroconger hassi) is a species of heteroconger belonging to the family Congridae. It is native to the Indo-Pacific. It is also known as Hass's garden eel.

== Description ==
The spotted garden eel is a small fish that can reach a maximum length of 40 centimetres (16 in; 1.3 ft). Its body is anguiform (eel-like): long, thin, with a circular cross-section (14 millimetres (0.55 in) in average diameter) and a head of the same diameter as the body. The head appears shortened because the large mouth is close to the also large eyes. Nostrils are small and positioned in the center of the upper lip.

The body is white and covered with many small black spots. The spotted garden eel has three larger distinctive black spots; the first identifies the gills opening and the position of the tiny pectoral fins, the second is located in the central part of the body and the third one surrounds the anus. Juveniles have a very thin black body.

== Distribution and habitat ==
Colony of spotted garden eels at the Monterey Bay Aquarium.

The spotted garden eel is widespread throughout the tropical and subtropical waters of the Indo-Pacific from the eastern coasts of Africa including the Red Sea to Polynesia, and south from Japan to New Caledonia.

It lives exclusively in variously sized colonies on sandy bottoms that are exposed to currents, at depths from 15 to 45 meters. It digs a burrow from which emerges about a third of its body pointing their mouths towards the underwater current to catch drifting food.

== Biology ==
As in other heteroconger species, individuals rarely leave their burrow once it is finished, but will move burrows closer together during breeding season until contact between partners is possible. Fertilized eggs and juveniles have a planktonic period before reaching sufficient size to start living in the substrate.

== Behavior ==
Plankton in ocean currents that drift are taken by the spotted garden eels. Feeding rates increased linearly with prey density; however, feeding rates didn't show a linear relationship with flow speed and decreased at 0.25 m/s -1.
