= Galapagos garden eel =

Conservation status
- Least Concern (IUCN 3.1)

Scientific classification
- Kingdom: Animalia
- Phylum: Chordata
- Class: Actinopterygii
- Order: Anguilliformes
- Family: Congridae
- Genus: Heteroconger
- Species: H. klausewitzi

Binomial name
- Heteroconger klausewitzi (Eibl-Eibesfeldt & Köster, 1983)

Synonyms
- Taenioconger klausewitzi Eibl-Eibesfeldt & Köster, 1983

Species of fish

The Galapagos garden eel (Heteroconger klausewitzi) is an eel in the family Congridae (conger/garden eels). It was described by Irenäus Eibl-Eibesfeldt and Friedmann Köster in 1983, originally under the genus Taenioconger. It is a marine, tropical eel which is known from the eastern central and southeastern Pacific Ocean, including Colombia, Costa Rica, the Galapagos Islands in Ecuador, and Panama. It dwells at a depth of 10 to 30 m (30 to 100 ft), and lives in large, nonmigratory colonies in clean, sandy substrates. Males can reach a maximum total length of 70 cm (2 ft 4 in).

== Etymology ==
The fish is named in honor of German ichthyologist Wolfgang Klausewitz, who visited the Galápagos Islands where this eel occurs, with the senior author in the 1950s.

== More on the eel ==
The diet of the Galapagos garden eel consists of zooplankton. Due to its widespread distribution in the eastern Pacific, lack of major threats, and lack of observed population decline, the IUCN redlist currently lists the species as Least Concern.
