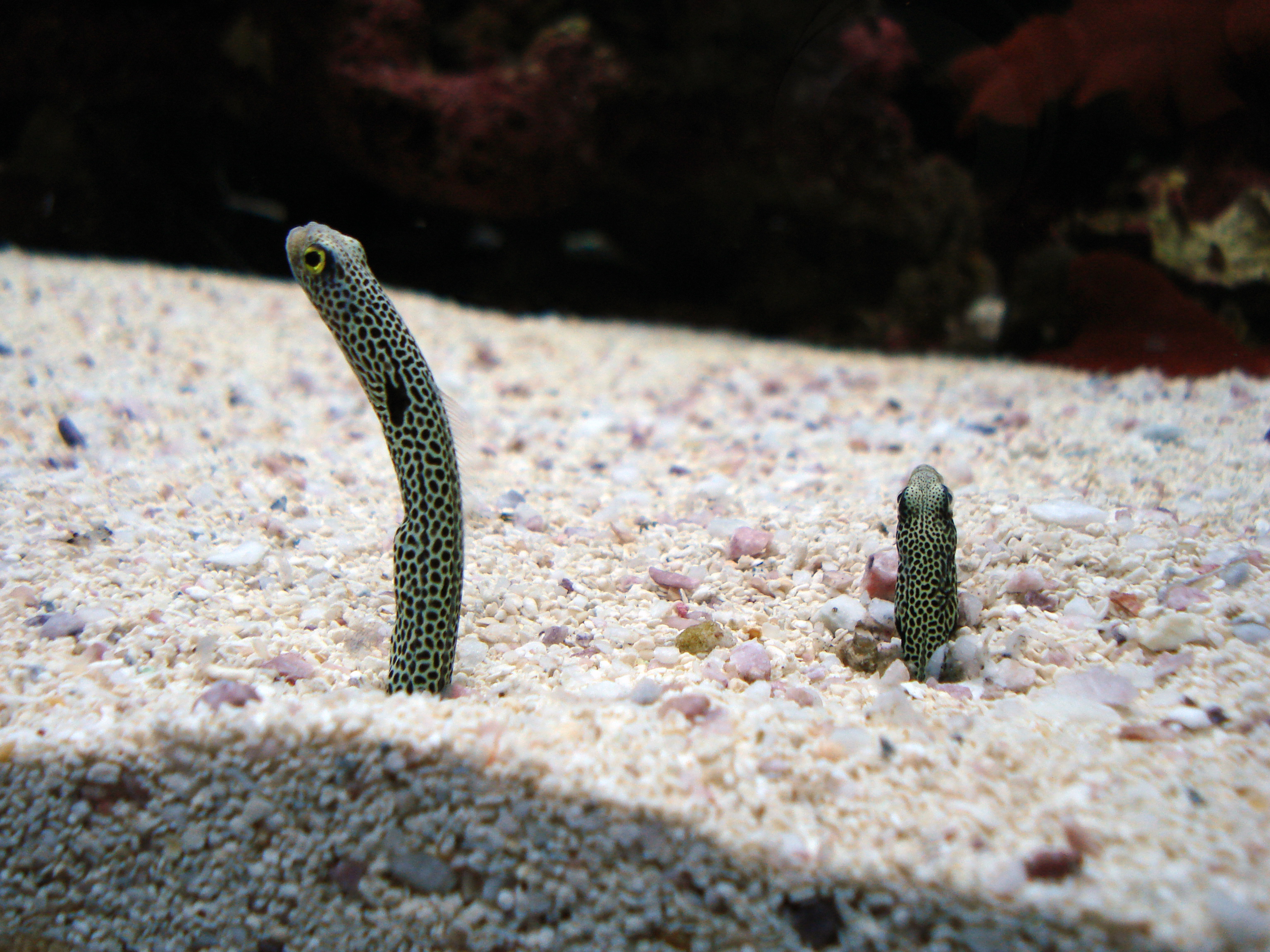
- Spotted garden eels, Heteroconger hassi

Scientific classification
- Kingdom: Animalia
- Phylum: Chordata
- Class: Actinopterygii
- Division: Teleostei
- Order: Anguilliformes
- Family: Congridae
- Subfamily: Heterocongrinae
- Genus: Heteroconger; Bleeker, 1868

Type species
- Heteroconger polyzona Bleeker, 1868

Species
- See text

Synonyms
- Taenioconger Herre, 1923; Taeniconger Jordan, 1923; Nystactes Böhlke, 1957; Nystactichthys Böhlke, 1958; Xarifania Klausewitz & Eibl-Eibesfeldt, 1959

= Heteroconger =

Genus of fishes

Heteroconger is a genus of marine congrid eels. These small, slender garden eels live in groups where each individual has its own burrow. Usually, only the head and front half of the body is visible. The greatest species richness is in the Indo-Pacific, but species are also found in the warmer parts of the Atlantic (including the Caribbean) and the eastern Pacific. The genus name relates to the species' distinct appearance, particularly in dentition, from other closely related eels.

The garden eel is roughly 40 cm (16 in) long. The eel has large eyes compared to its body, and a weak sense of smell because of its tiny nostrils. It is timid around other animals and people, but slightly aggressive towards other males of its species. If it feels threatened, it retreats into its burrow and closes it with a mucus block so the predator cannot dig into its home. It has a gland in its tail that secretes a sticky substance that keeps the burrow from falling in on itself and burying the garden eel in sand. Scientists have yet to determine the garden eel's lifespan in the wild.

The garden eel is a carnivore, and eats plankton. Because of its large eyes, it relies mostly on sight to find its food. It catches the plankton by staying in its burrow and swaying its head about to catch the plankton drifting by in the current.

Garden eels are sexual reproducers and sexually dimorphic. In the mating season, the eels move their burrows closer together, until they are within reaching distance. Then, the male picks which female he wants to mate and defends her viciously, biting at the head and even the eyes of any other suitors. The couple mates and the female releases the fertilized eggs, letting them float away and gather around the epipelagic zone. The garden eels develop and hatch out of their eggs while floating in the water and, when they are large enough, swim down to a sand bed and dig a burrow of their own.

One of its top predators, the Pacific snake eel, Ophicthus triserialis, burrows into the sand near a colony, then digs under a garden eel's burrow and grabs its tail. This all happens under the substrate, where the unsuspecting garden eel cannot see what is happening. Trigger fish scare the garden eels into retreating into their burrows, then dig them up and devour them.

== Species ==
There are currently 24 recognized species in the genus Heteroconger. Some species of the genus Heteroconger are also recognized under the junior synonymous genus Taenioconger, but today it is widely recognized as invalid compared to Heteroconger. Species are diverse in morphological patterning such as spotting, banding, freckled and flat colorations. Heteroconger eels range in length from the shortest growing to around 33 cm, to the longest growing to about 80 cm (31 in).

The currently recognized species in this genus are:

Species and characteristics
Species	Geographically found	Depth found (m)	Max body length (cm)	Described by	Year described
Heteroconger balteatus	Western Indian Ocean and Red Sea	46	33	Castle & J.E. Randall	1999
Heteroconger camelopardalis	Southwestern and Southeastern Atlantic Ocean	--	--	Lubbock	1980
Heteroconger canabus (White-ring garden eel)	Gulf of California	20	80	G.I. McT. Cowan & Rosenblatt	1974
Heteroconger chapmani	Philippines (West Pacific Ocean)	--	69	Herre	1923
Heteroconger cobra (cobra garden eel)	Western Central Pacific Ocean	--	40	Böhlke & J.E. Randall	1981
Heteroconger congroides	Western Indian Ocean and Red Sea	522	--	D'Ancona	1928
Heteroconger digueti (Pale green eel)	Eastern Central Pacific	230-275	63	Pellegrin	1923
Heteroconger enigmaticus (engima garden eel)	Western Pacific Ocean	3-25	43.7	Castle & J.E. Randall	1999
Heteroconger fugax (shy garden eel)	Northwestern Pacific Ocean	10-32	--	Koeda, Fujii & Motomura	2018
Heteroconger guttatus (spotted garden eel)	--	--	--	Allen, Erdmann & Mongdong	2020
Heteroconger hassi (Hass's garden eel)	Indo-Pacific	15-45	40	Klausewitz & Eibl-Eibesfeldt	1959
Heteroconger klausewitzi (Galapagos garden eel)	Eastern Central and Southeastern Pacific Ocean	10-30	70	Eibl-Eibesfeldt & Köster	1983
Heteroconger lentiginosus (masked garden eel)	Pacific Ocean	--	37	Böhlke & J.E. Randall	1981
Heteroconger longissimus (brown garden eel)	Eastern and Western Atlantic Ocean	10-60	51	Günther	1870
Heteroconger luteolus (yellow garden eel)	Western Atlantic & Gulf of Mexico	33	50	Smith	1989
†Heteroconger mataura	--	--	--	Schwarzhans, Lee & Gard	2017
Heteroconger mercyae (Mercy's garden eel)	Western Pacific Ocean	4-10	67.8	Allen & Erdmann	2009
Heteroconger obscurus (obscure garden eel)	Eastern Indian Ocean	15	33.6	Klausewitz & Eibl-Eibesfeldt	1959
Heteroconger pellegrini (mimic garden eel)	East Pacific Ocean	5-30	63	Castle	1999
Heteroconger perissidon (black garden eel)	Western Pacific and Eastern Indian Oceans	1-35	53.7	Böhlke & J.E. Randall	1981
Heteroconger polyzona (zebra garden eel)	Indo-Western Pacific	1-10	34.7	Bleeker	1868
Heteroconger taylori (Taylor's garden eel)	Central Indo-Pacific	5-15	48	Castle & J.E. Randall	1995
Heteroconger tomberua	Western Pacific Ocean	36	42.8	Castle & J.E. Randall	1995
Heteroconger tricia (Tricia's garden eel)	Eastern Indian Ocean	--	49.6	Castle & J.E. Randall	1999
