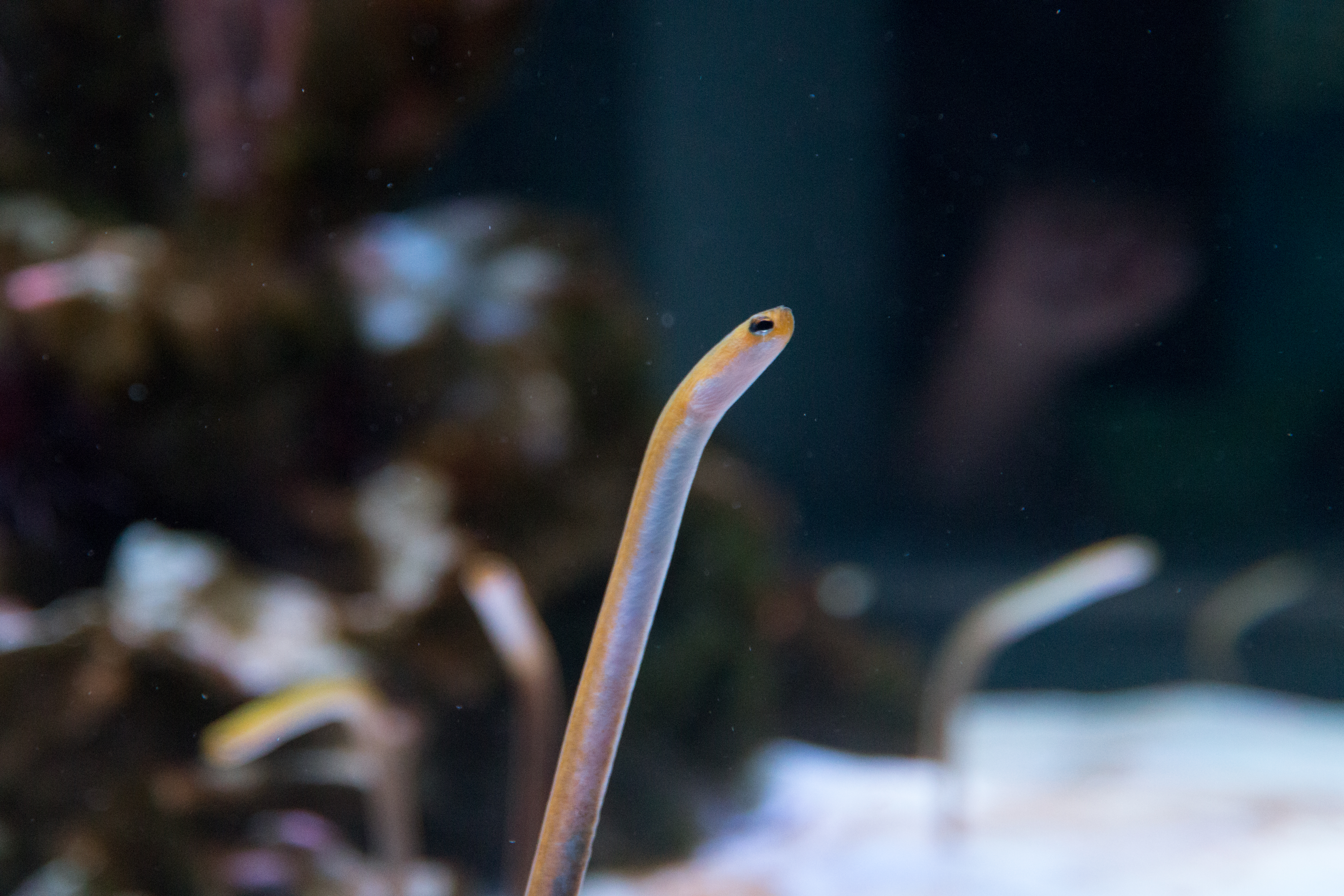

Conservation status
- Least Concern (IUCN 3.1)

Scientific classification
- Kingdom: Animalia
- Phylum: Chordata
- Class: Actinopterygii
- Order: Anguilliformes
- Family: Congridae
- Genus: Heteroconger
- Species: H. luteolus

Binomial name
- Heteroconger luteolus D. G. Smith, 1989

= Yellow garden eel =

Species of fish

The yellow garden eel (Heteroconger luteolus) is a species of marine ray-finned fish belonging to the family Congridae, encompassing the conger and garden eels. This species is found in the Western Atlantic and the Gulf of Mexico.

== Taxonomy ==
The yellow garden eel was first formally described in 1989 by the American ichthyologist David George Smith with its type locality given as the Eastern Gulf of Mexico off Florida at 28°42'00.3"N, 84°20'00.7"W from a depth of 33 m (108 ft). This species is classified in the genus Heteroconger in the subfamily Heterocongrinae, the garden eels, of the family Congridae, which also includes the conger eels, Congridae belongs to the suborder Congroidei in the order Anguilliformes, the eels.

The yellow garden eel is classified in the genus heteroconger. This name was coined by Pieter Bleeker and it prefixes conger with hetero, meaning different, because this genus was significantly different from the other conger genera Bleeker knew of. The specific name, luteolus, means "yellowish", an allusion to the bright yellow color on the back while alive and a paler yellow when preserved.

== Description ==
The yellow garden eel has an elongated body with a tail which is longer than the head and trunk. It has a very short snout and an oblique, lower jaw that slightly protrudes beyond the upper jaw. The teeth are arranged in wide bands on the jaws and on the palatine. The top lip has flanges which cover the front of the snout and the front, tubular nostrils. The pectoral fins are merely small flaps of skin. The tip of the tail is stiff, with a small caudal fin and the dorsal and anal fins are united with the caudal fin. The lateral line has a large number of pores. The dorsal half of the head and adjacent body is bright yellow, marked with many small, scattered dark spots. There is a sharp demarcation between the yellow dorsal color and the white ventral color. The lips are dark and the eye has a black bar separating the yellow upper iris from the lower white iris. This species reaches a length of 50 cm (20 in).

== Distribution and habitat ==
The yellow garden eel is known only to inhabit the Atlantic Ocean off the coast of Florida into the Gulf of Mexico. It is found from southeastern Florida and west into the Gulf, going north as far as Pensacola. This species is found at depths between 10 and 35 m (33 and 115 ft), living in burrows on the sandy seabed and poking out of its burrow to feed on plankton in the current.
