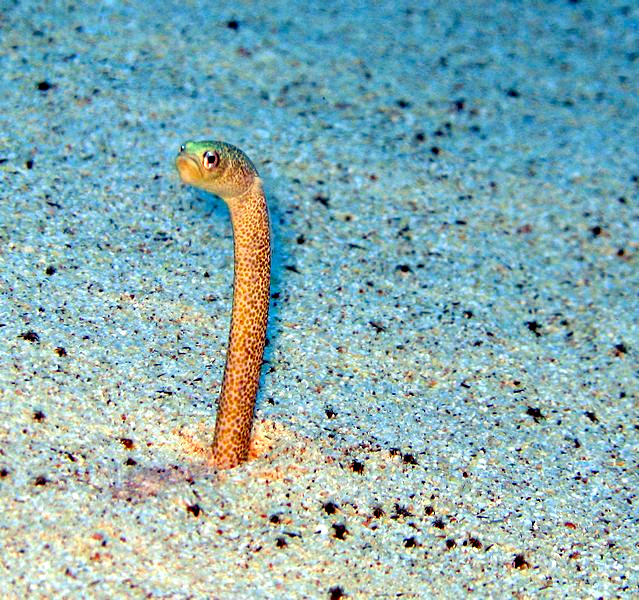

Conservation status
- Data Deficient (IUCN 3.1)

Scientific classification
- Kingdom: Animalia
- Phylum: Chordata
- Class: Actinopterygii
- Order: Anguilliformes
- Family: Congridae
- Genus: Gorgasia
- Species: G. sillneri

Binomial name
- Gorgasia sillneri Klausewitz, 1962

= Gorgasia sillneri =

Species of fish

Gorgasia sillneri is a species of eel in the conger/garden eel family Congridae. It was described by Wolfgang Klausewitz in 1962. It is a marine, tropical eel which is known from the Gulf of Aqaba in the Red Sea, in the western Indian Ocean. Males can reach a maximum total length of 83.8 centimetres (33.0 in).

== Etymology ==
The fish is named in honor of a German underwater photographer, Ludwig Sillner (1914–1973), who collected the holotype specimen and made important observations in the field on its ecology and life coloration.
