= Black garden eel =

Conservation status
- Least Concern (IUCN 3.1)

Scientific classification
- Kingdom: Animalia
- Phylum: Chordata
- Class: Actinopterygii
- Order: Anguilliformes
- Family: Congridae
- Genus: Heteroconger
- Species: H. perissodon

Binomial name
- Heteroconger perissodon Böhlke & Randall, 1981

Species of fish

The black garden eel (Heteroconger perissodon) is an eel in the family Congridae (conger/garden eels). It was described by James Erwin Böhlke and John Ernest Randall in 1981. It is a tropical, nonmigratory marine eel which is known from the western Pacific Ocean and eastern Indian Ocean, including Ambon (Indonesia), Negros (Philippines), and the Andaman Islands (India). It dwells at a depth range of 1–35 m. It leads a benthic lifestyle, and inhabits sand or mud, living solitary or in colonies. Males can reach a maximum total length of 53.7 cm (21.1 in).
