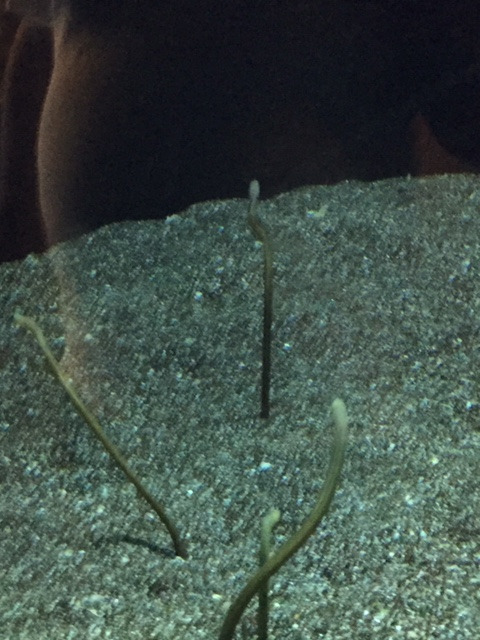

Conservation status
- Least Concern (IUCN 3.1)

Scientific classification
- Kingdom: Animalia
- Phylum: Chordata
- Class: Actinopterygii
- Order: Anguilliformes
- Family: Congridae
- Genus: Gorgasia
- Species: G. hawaiiensis

Binomial name
- Gorgasia hawaiiensis J. E. Randall & Chess, 1980

= Hawaiian garden eel =

Species of fish

The Hawaiian garden eel (Gorgasia hawaiiensis) is a species of eel in the family Congridae (conger/garden eels). It was described by John Ernest Randall and James Robert Chess in 1980. It is a marine, tropical eel which is known from the Hawaiian archipelago (from which its species epithet is derived), in the eastern central Pacific Ocean. It is non-migratory, and is thought to be restricted to the region. It dwells at a depth range of 11 to 53 metres (36 to 174 ft), and leads a benthic life, forming burrows in sand. Males can reach a maximum standard length of 59.8 centimetres (23.5 in).

This eel appears during sunrise and returns to its burrow around sunset, making it a diurnal animal. Although burrows of this eel are more abundant in shallow water, larger burrows belonging to this eel can be found in deeper water.

The Hawaiian garden eel's diet consists of zoobenthos.
