= Gorgasia inferomaculata =

Conservation status
- Data Deficient (IUCN 3.1)

Scientific classification
- Kingdom: Animalia
- Phylum: Chordata
- Class: Actinopterygii
- Order: Anguilliformes
- Family: Congridae
- Genus: Gorgasia
- Species: G. inferomaculata

Binomial name
- Gorgasia inferomaculata (Blache, 1977)

Synonyms
- Leptocephalus inferomaculatus Blache, 1977

Species of fish

Gorgasia inferomaculata is an eel in the family Congridae (conger/garden eels). It was described by Jacques Blache in 1977. It is a non-migratory marine, tropical eel which is known from the Gulf of Guinea, in the eastern central Atlantic Ocean.
