= Mimic garden eel =

Conservation status
- Least Concern (IUCN 3.1)

Scientific classification
- Kingdom: Animalia
- Phylum: Chordata
- Class: Actinopterygii
- Division: Teleostei
- Order: Anguilliformes
- Family: Congridae
- Genus: Heteroconger
- Species: H. pellegrini

Binomial name
- Heteroconger pellegrini Castle, 1999

Species of fish

The mimic garden eel (Heteroconger pellegrini), also known as the speckled garden eel, is a species of garden eel from the East Pacific. This fish is found at depths of 5–30 m (16–98 ft) from Baja California to Panama.

It reaches 63 cm (25 in) in length. Like other garden eels, it is found in groups in sandy areas. Typically, only its head and upper part of the body protrudes from the sand, and it will retreat entirely if approached by large fish or divers. They feed on zooplankton.
