= Heteroconger camelopardalis =

Conservation status
- Least Concern (IUCN 3.1)

Scientific classification
- Kingdom: Animalia
- Phylum: Chordata
- Class: Actinopterygii
- Order: Anguilliformes
- Family: Congridae
- Genus: Heteroconger
- Species: H. camelopardalis

Binomial name
- Heteroconger camelopardalis (Lubbock, 1980)

Synonyms
- Taenioconger camelopardalis Lubbock, 1980

Species of fish

Heteroconger camelopardalis is an eel in the family Congridae (conger/garden eels). It was described by Hugh Roger Lubbock in 1980. It is a non-migratory marine, tropical eel which is known from the southwestern and southeastern Atlantic Ocean, including northeastern Brazil and Ascension Island. Its population is abundant in Brazil.
