= Heteroconger mercyae =

Conservation status
- Least Concern (IUCN 3.1)

Scientific classification
- Kingdom: Animalia
- Phylum: Chordata
- Class: Actinopterygii
- Order: Anguilliformes
- Family: Congridae
- Genus: Heteroconger
- Species: H. mercyae

Binomial name
- Heteroconger mercyae G. R. Allen & Erdmann, 2009

Species of fish

Heteroconger mercyae, or Mercy's garden eel, is an eel in the family Congridae (conger/garden eels). It was described by Gerald R. Allen and Mark van Nydeck Erdmann in 2009. It is a marine, tropical eel which is known from the western Pacific Ocean, including the Philippines, Indonesia, and possibly New Britain. It is known to dwell at a depth of 4 to 10 m (13 to 33 ft), and inhabit sediments of silt-like sand. Males can reach a maximum total length of 67.8 cm (26.7 in).

== Etymology ==
The species epithet "mercyae" was given in honour of Mercy Paine, whom the authors credited with discovering the colony from which the species is known, and assisting with the collection of specimens for study.
