= Dotted garden eel =

Scientific classification
- Kingdom: Animalia
- Phylum: Chordata
- Class: Actinopterygii
- Division: Teleostei
- Order: Anguilliformes
- Family: Congridae
- Genus: Gorgasia
- Species: G. punctata

Binomial name
- Gorgasia punctata Meek & Hildebrand, 1923

Species of fish

The dotted garden eel (Gorgasia punctata), also known as the peppered garden eel, is an eel in the family Congridae (conger/garden eels). It was described by Seth Eugene Meek and Samuel Frederick Hildebrand in 1923. It is a nonmigratory tropical, marine eel which is known from the eastern central Pacific Ocean, including Costa Rica, El Salvador, Guatemala, Honduras, Mexico, Nicaragua, and Panama. Males can reach a maximum total length of 50 cm (20 in).

Due to the widespread distribution of the species, as well its lack of known threats and observed population declines, the IUCN Red List currently lists the dotted garden eel as Least Concern.
