= Heteroconger chapmani =

Conservation status
- Data Deficient (IUCN 3.1)

Scientific classification
- Kingdom: Animalia
- Phylum: Chordata
- Class: Actinopterygii
- Order: Anguilliformes
- Family: Congridae
- Genus: Heteroconger
- Species: H. chapmani

Binomial name
- Heteroconger chapmani (Herre, 1923)

Synonyms
- Taenioconger chapmani Herre, 1923

Species of fish

Heteroconger chapmani is an eel in the family Congridae (conger/garden eels). It was described by Albert William Herre in 1923. It is a marine, tropical eel which is known from a single specimen collected from the Philippines, in the western central Pacific Ocean. The holotype specimen measured 69 cm (27 in; 2.26 ft). The species is now considered unidentifiable due to the lack of detail in the author's description, and because the only known specimen was destroyed during World War II.
