= White-ring garden eel =

Conservation status
- Data Deficient (IUCN 3.1)

Scientific classification
- Kingdom: Animalia
- Phylum: Chordata
- Class: Actinopterygii
- Order: Anguilliformes
- Family: Congridae
- Genus: Heteroconger
- Species: H. canabus

Binomial name
- Heteroconger canabus (Cowan & Rosenblatt, 1974)

Synonyms
- Taenioconger canabus Cowan & Rosenblatt, 1974

Species of fish

The white-ring garden eel (Heteroconger canabus), also known as the Cape garden eel in Mexico, is an eel in the family Congridae (conger/garden eels). It was described by Garry I. McTaggart-Cowan and Richard Heinrich Rosenblatt in 1974, originally under the genus Taenioconger. It is a marine, tropical eel which is known from the Gulf of California, in the eastern central Pacific Ocean. It is known to dwell at a depth of 20 m (66 ft), and inhabits sand sediments near reefs, where it forms burrows in nonmigratory colonies. Males can reach a maximum total length of 80 cm (31 in; 2.6 ft).

The white-ring garden eel's diet consists of zooplankton. It is currently listed as Data Deficient at the IUCN redlist due to dispute over its taxonomy, although it notes that if valid, the species may be under threat as a result of inhabiting an intrareef region in a range restricted to 1,000 km^{2}.
