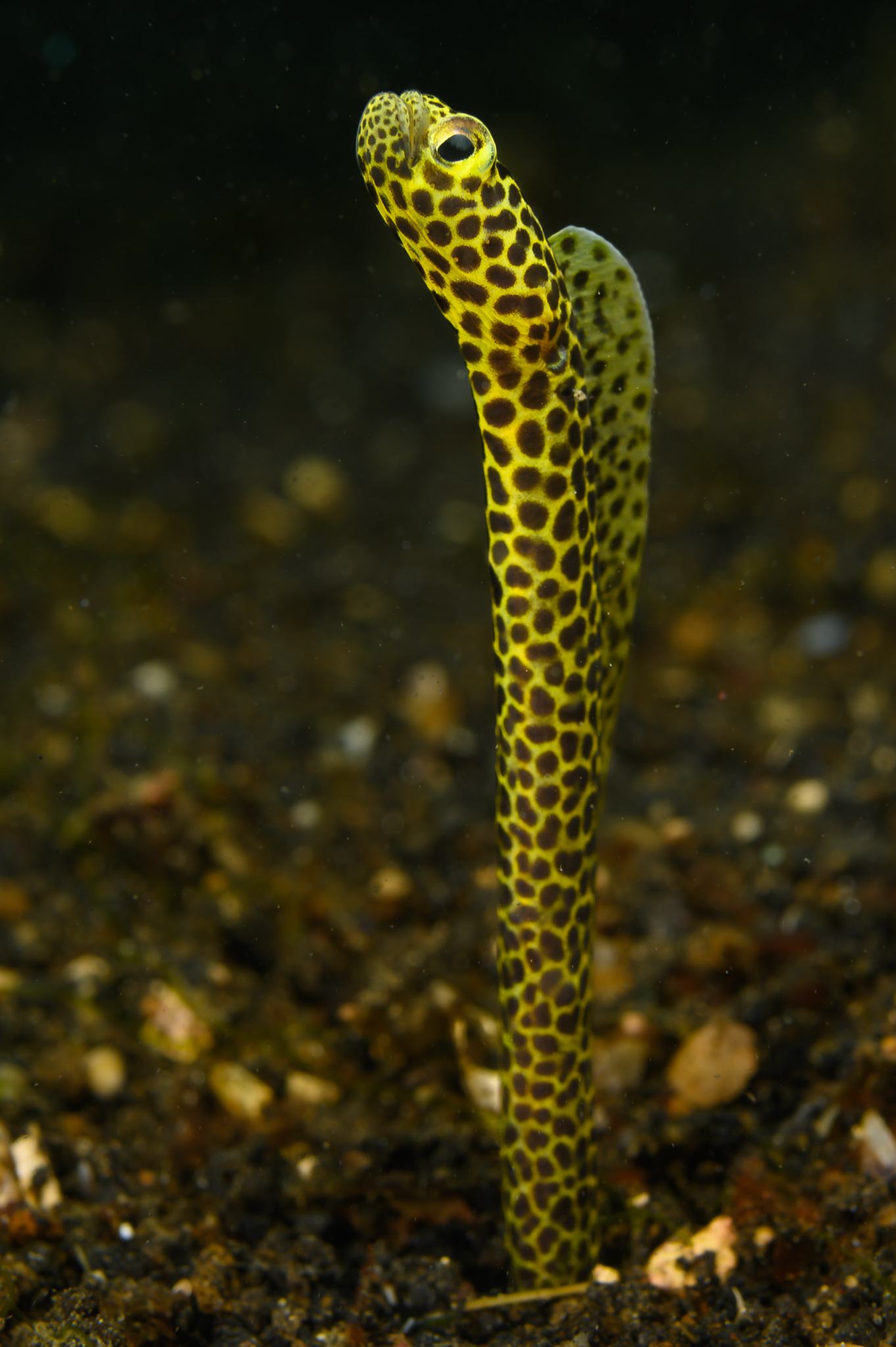

Conservation status
- Data Deficient (IUCN 3.1)

Scientific classification
- Kingdom: Animalia
- Phylum: Chordata
- Class: Actinopterygii
- Order: Anguilliformes
- Family: Congridae
- Genus: Heteroconger
- Species: H. taylori

Binomial name
- Heteroconger taylori Castle & Randall, 1995

= Taylor's garden eel =

Species of fish

Taylor's garden-eel (Heteroconger taylori) is a heteroconger belonging to the family Congridae. It is native to the central Indo-Pacific.

== Description ==
Taylor's garden-eel is a small fish that can reach a maximum length of 48 cm. Its body is anguiform (eel-like): long, thin, with a circular cross-section (20 mm in average diameter) and a head of the same diameter as the body.

The body is white to yellowish and covered with many small black spots with patterns that vary from one individual to another and may include circular mottling or labyrinthine patterns. The dorsal fin always has a simple speckle pattern.

== Distribution and habitat ==
The species is widespread throughout the tropical waters of the western central Indo-Pacific from the Philippines to Papua-New-Guinea and Indonesia.

It lives solitary or in small colonies on sandy bottoms in association with seagrass meadows, at depths between 5 and 15 m deep. It digs a burrow from which emerges about a third of its body. The eel then points its mouth towards into the current to catch drifting food.

== Biology ==
Taylor's garden-eel feeds on zooplankton which it spots with its large eyes. As in other heteroconger species, individuals rarely leave their burrow once it is finished, but will shift burrows closer together during breeding season until contact between partners is possible. Fertilized eggs and juveniles have a planktonic period before reaching sufficient size to start living in the substrate.

== Conservation status ==
The IUCN redlist currently lists Taylor's garden eel as Data Deficient, due to a lack of information on the population statistics. It is suspected that the population, due to its tendency to inhabit seagrass meadows, may be at risk on behalf of threats affecting seagrass in the region of Indonesia.
