= Heteroconger balteatus =

Conservation status
- Data Deficient (IUCN 3.1)

Scientific classification
- Kingdom: Animalia
- Phylum: Chordata
- Class: Actinopterygii
- Order: Anguilliformes
- Family: Congridae
- Genus: Heteroconger
- Species: H. balteatus

Binomial name
- Heteroconger balteatus Castle & Randall, 1999

Species of fish

Heteroconger balteatus is an eel in the family Congridae (conger/garden eels). It was described by Peter Henry John Castle and John Ernest Randall in 1999. It is a marine, tropical eel which is known from Saudi Arabia and the Red Sea, in the western Indian Ocean. It is known to dwell at a minimum depth of 46 m (151 ft), and inhabits regions of current, where it forms burrows in sand. It enters its burrows tail-first. Females can reach a maximum total length of 33.1 cm (13.0 in; 1.09 ft).

The species epithet balteatus refers to the white "belt" on the trunk of the eel. Its diet consists of zooplankton.
