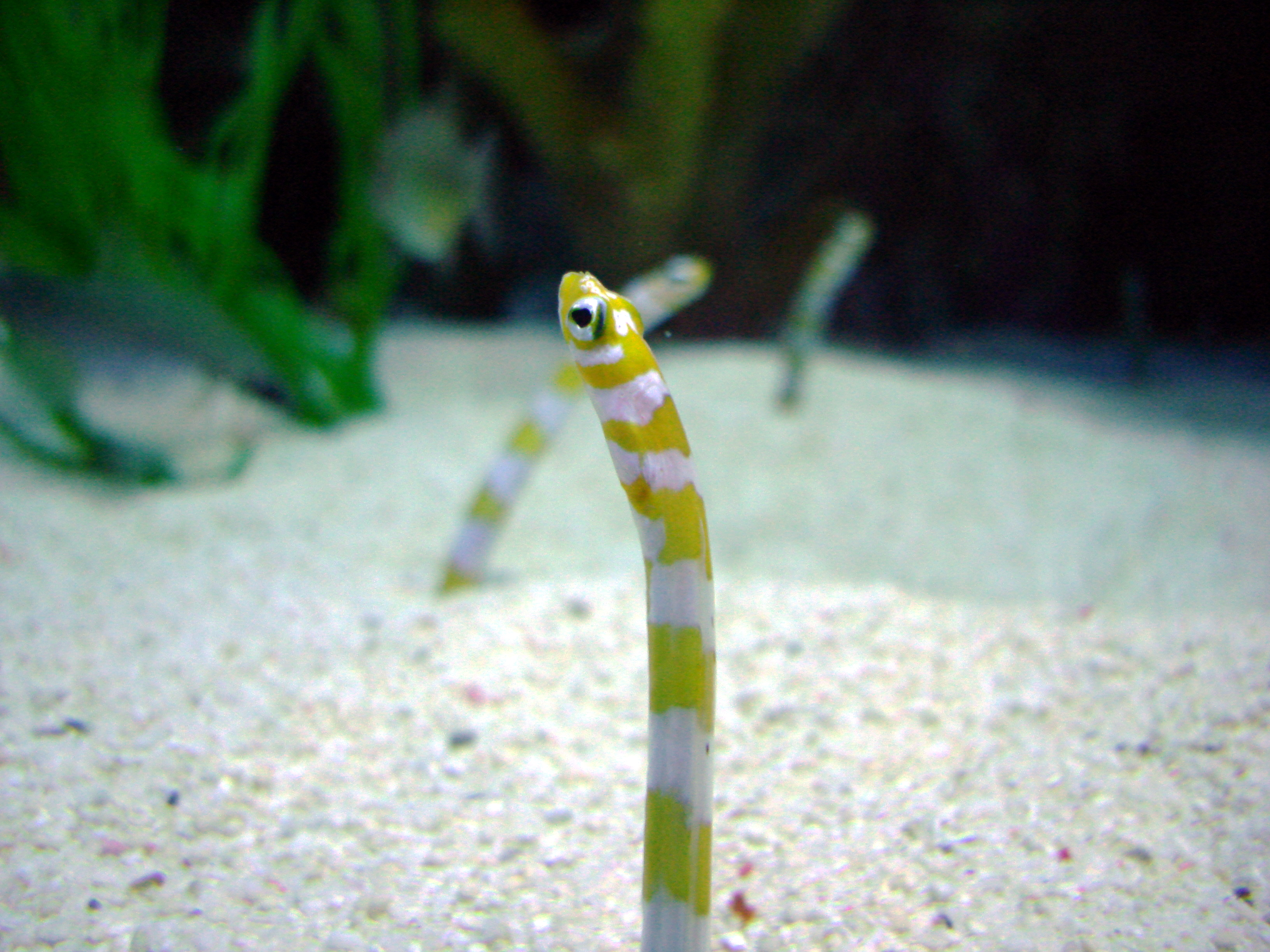

Conservation status
- Least Concern (IUCN 3.1)

Scientific classification
- Kingdom: Animalia
- Phylum: Chordata
- Class: Actinopterygii
- Order: Anguilliformes
- Family: Congridae
- Genus: Gorgasia
- Species: G. preclara

Binomial name
- Gorgasia preclara J. E. Böhlke & J. E. Randall, 1981

= Gorgasia preclara =

Species of fish

Splendid garden eels in captivity.

Gorgasia preclara, the splendid garden eel, orange-banded garden eel, or orange-barred garden eel, is a species of Indo-Pacific garden eel.

== Description ==
The splendid garden eel is a medium-sized fish, reaching a maximum length up to 40 cm. Its body has a circular shape with a diameter of about 10 mm. Its body color is yellow to orange with characteristic white bands.

== Distribution and habitat ==
Gorgasia preclara is widespread throughout the tropical waters of the Indo-West Pacific area from the Maldives to Indonesian archipelago and the Papua New Guinea and north to Ryukyu, Japanese archipelagos, and south to the Philippines. It occurs in sandy areas exposed to currents at depths between 18 and 75 m, but is usually observed at an average depth of 30 m.

== Biology ==
The splendid garden eel lives in a buried tube in the sand, either alone or in groups ranging anywhere from three to over a thousand eels. Typically, only its head and uppermost body protrude from the sand, and it will retreat entirely if approached by large fish or divers. They feed on drifting plankton.

== Reproduction ==
During mating season male and female eels will move burrows to increase proximity to one another. Males will often engage in a courtship display of protective behaviors and may bite rival eels. After a male has won a display, the male and female eel will stretch from their burrows to intertwine bodies. Splendid garden eels are pelagic spawners, meaning that female eels will release fertilized eggs into the current. When the eggs hatch in the current, larvae continue to float until they reach a certain size. Once they've hit this size threshold juvenile eels will dig their sand burrow.
