= Gorgasia naeocepaea =

Conservation status
- Data Deficient (IUCN 3.1)

Scientific classification
- Kingdom: Animalia
- Phylum: Chordata
- Class: Actinopterygii
- Order: Anguilliformes
- Family: Congridae
- Genus: Gorgasia
- Species: G. naeocepaea

Binomial name
- Gorgasia naeocepaea (J. E. Böhlke, 1951)

Synonyms
- Taenioconger naeocepaeus Böhlke, 1951; Gorgasia naeocepaeus (Böhlke, 1951)

Species of fish

Gorgasia naeocepaea, the freckled garden eel, is an eel in the family Congridae (conger/garden eels). It was described by James Erwin Böhlke in 1951, originally under the genus Taenioconger. It is a marine, tropical eel which is known from the western central Pacific Ocean, including the Philippines and Indonesia. It is known to inhabit sandy regions, and dwells at a depth range of 10 to 24 metres (33 to 79 ft). Males can reach a maximum total length of 75 centimetres (30 in).
