= Masked garden eel =

Conservation status
- Least Concern (IUCN 3.1)

Scientific classification
- Kingdom: Animalia
- Phylum: Chordata
- Class: Actinopterygii
- Order: Anguilliformes
- Family: Congridae
- Genus: Heteroconger
- Species: H. lentiginosus

Binomial name
- Heteroconger lentiginosus J. E. Böhlke & J. E. Randall, 1999

Species of fish

The masked garden eel (Heteroconger lentiginosus) is a type of marine conger found in the Pacific Ocean. They grow up to 37 centimetres (15 in; 1.21 ft) long.
