= Klausewitz's garden eel =

Scientific classification
- Kingdom: Animalia
- Phylum: Chordata
- Class: Actinopterygii
- Order: Anguilliformes
- Family: Congridae
- Genus: Gorgasia
- Species: G. klausewitzi

Binomial name
- Gorgasia klausewitzi Quéro & Saldanha, 1995

Species of fish

The Klausewitz's garden eel (Gorgasia klausewitzi) is an eel in the family Congridae (the conger or garden eels). It was described by Jean-Claude Quéro and Luiz Vieria Caldas Saldanha in 1995. It is a marine, tropical species, which is known from the Indian Ocean, including waters off the Andaman Islands, Réunion, Mauritius, and the Comoros Islands. It dwells at a depth range of 170 to 225 metres (558 to 738 ft) and forms large colonies consisting of hundreds of individual eels. Males can reach a maximum total length of 75.1 centimetres (29.6 in).

== Etymology ==
The fish is named in honor of German ichthyologist Wolfgang Klausewitz who was an expert in garden eels, and who encouraged the authors to describe this species of eel as a new species.
