= Gorgasia thamani =

Scientific classification
- Kingdom: Animalia
- Phylum: Chordata
- Class: Actinopterygii
- Order: Anguilliformes
- Family: Congridae
- Genus: Gorgasia
- Species: G. thamani

Binomial name
- Gorgasia thamani Greenfield & Niesz, 2004

Species of fish

Gorgasia thamani is an eel in the family Congridae (conger/garden eels). It was described by David W. Greenfield and Sean Niesz in 2004. It is a marine, tropical eel which is known from Fiji, in the western central Pacific Ocean. It is known to dwell at a depth range of 14 to 15 metres (46 to 49 ft). Males can reach a maximum total length of 119 centimetres (47 in).

== Etymology ==
The species epithet "thamani" was given in honour of Randolph R. Thaman, of the University of the South Pacific in Fiji. In recognition for his unending help to the authors in arranging their field work. And recognizing his skill in promoting the conservation of Fiji’s marine and terrestrial fauna.
