= Tricia's garden eel =

Conservation status
- Data Deficient (IUCN 3.1)

Scientific classification
- Kingdom: Animalia
- Phylum: Chordata
- Class: Actinopterygii
- Order: Anguilliformes
- Family: Congridae
- Genus: Heteroconger
- Species: H. tricia

Binomial name
- Heteroconger tricia Castle & J. E. Randall, 1999

Species of fish

Tricia's garden eel (Heteroconger tricia) is an eel in the family Congridae (conger/garden eels). It was described by Peter Henry John Castle and John Ernest Randall in 1999. It is a marine, tropical eel which is known from Flores, Indonesia, in the eastern Indian Ocean. Males can reach a maximum total length of 49.6 cm (19.5 in).
