= Pale green eel =

Conservation status
- Least Concern (IUCN 3.1)

Scientific classification
- Kingdom: Animalia
- Phylum: Chordata
- Class: Actinopterygii
- Order: Anguilliformes
- Family: Congridae
- Genus: Heteroconger
- Species: H. digueti

Binomial name
- Heteroconger digueti (Pellegrin, 1923)

Synonyms
- Taenioconger digueti Pellegrin, 1923

Species of fish

The pale green eel (Heteroconger digueti), also known as the pale garden eel or the Cortez garden eel, is an eel in the family Congridae (conger/garden eels). It was described by Jacques Pellegrin in 1923, originally under the genus Taenioconger. It is a nonmigratory marine, deepwater-dwelling eel which is known from the eastern central Pacific Ocean, including the Gulf of California and Mexico. It dwells at a depth of 230 to 275 m (755 to 902 ft) and inhabits sandy sediments near reefs in large colonies. Males can reach a maximum total length of 63 cm (25 in; 2.07 ft).

The pale green eel's diet consists of zooplankton. Despite its restricted range, the IUCN redlist currently lists the species as Least Concern due to its common local occurrence, and the lack of known major threats.
