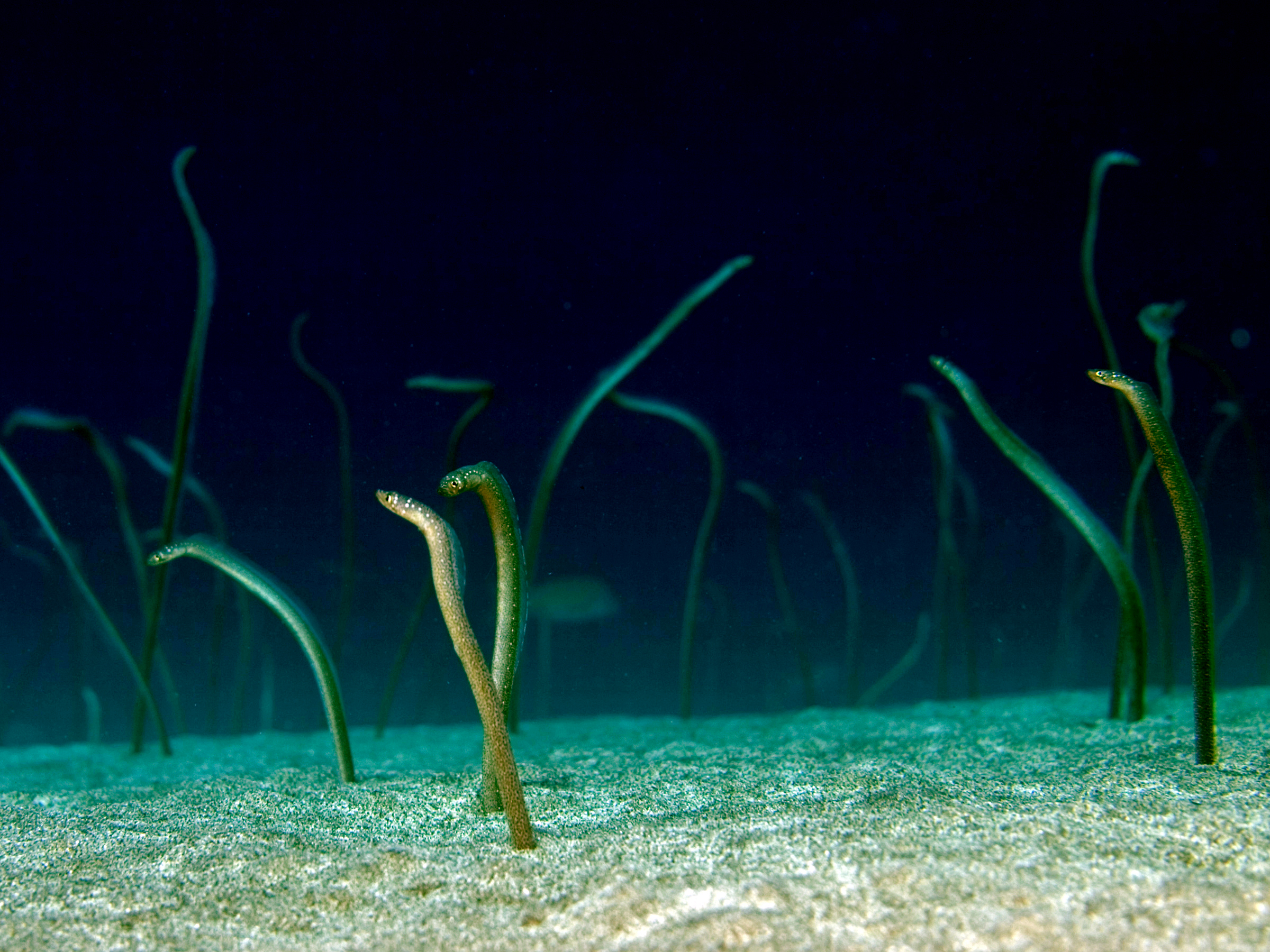

Conservation status
- Data Deficient (IUCN 3.1)

Scientific classification
- Kingdom: Animalia
- Phylum: Chordata
- Class: Actinopterygii
- Division: Teleostei
- Order: Anguilliformes
- Family: Congridae
- Genus: Gorgasia
- Species: G. barnesi

Binomial name
- Gorgasia barnesi B. H. Robison & Lancraft, 1984

= Barnes' garden eel =

Species of fish

The Barnes' garden eel (Gorgasia barnesi) is an eel in the family Congridae (conger/garden eels). It was described by Bruce H. Robison and Thomas M. Lancraft in 1984. It is a marine, tropical eel which is known from the western Pacific Ocean, including Indonesia, the Philippines, Vanuatu, the Solomon Islands and Papua New Guinea. It dwells at a depth range of 5 to 20 metres (16 to 66 ft), and inhabits sand substrates. Males can reach a maximum total length of 121 centimetres (48 in).

== Etymology ==
The species epithet "barnesi" refers to Anthony T. Barnes.
