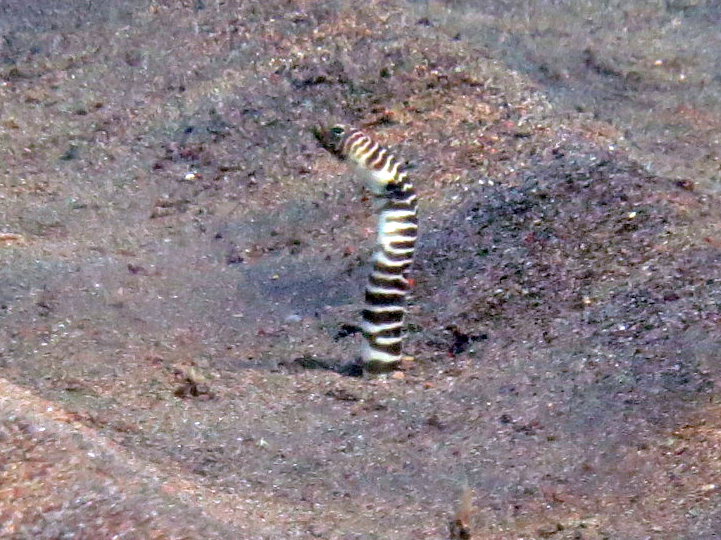

Conservation status
- Least Concern (IUCN 3.1)

Scientific classification
- Kingdom: Animalia
- Phylum: Chordata
- Class: Actinopterygii
- Order: Anguilliformes
- Family: Congridae
- Genus: Heteroconger
- Species: H. polyzona

Binomial name
- Heteroconger polyzona Bleeker, 1868

= Zebra garden eel =

Species of fish

The zebra garden eel (Heteroconger polyzona), also known as the banded garden eel, is a species of eel in the conger/garden eels family Congridae. It was described by Pieter Bleeker in 1868. It is a marine, tropical eel which is known from the Indo-Western Pacific, including the Philippines, the Ryukyu Islands, New Guinea, Indonesia and Vanuatu. It inhabits shallow waters at a depth range of 1 to 10 m (3.3 to 32.8 ft), and forms burrows in colonies of moderate size on sand sediments in bays, slopes and reefs. Males can reach a maximum total length of 34.7 cm (13.7 in; 1.14 ft).
