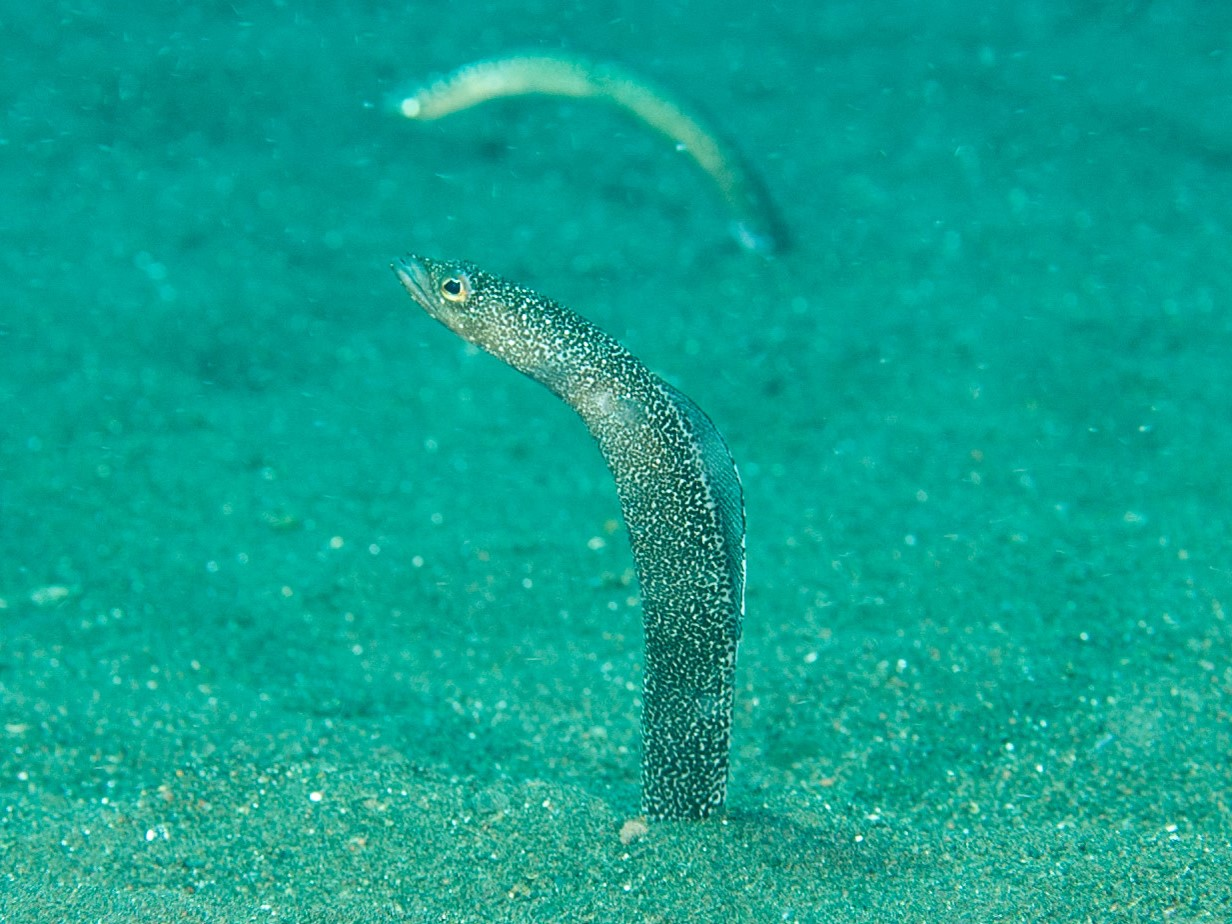

Conservation status
- Least Concern (IUCN 3.1)

Scientific classification
- Kingdom: Animalia
- Phylum: Chordata
- Class: Actinopterygii
- Order: Anguilliformes
- Family: Congridae
- Genus: Heteroconger
- Species: H. enigmaticus

Binomial name
- Heteroconger enigmaticus Castle & J. E. Randall, 1999

= Enigma garden eel =

Species of fish

The enigma garden eel (Heteroconger enigmaticus) is a species of eel in the conger/garden eel family Congridae.

== Taxonomy ==
The enigma garden eel was first described in 1999 by Peter Henry John Castle and John Ernest Randall. The species epithet enigmaticus is derived from the Greek 'αινιγματικός' (enigmatikós), meaning 'enigmatic.'

== Description ==
This species is a tropical marine eel that is harmless to humans. It is medium to dark brown in colour. Males can reach a maximum total length of 43.7 cm (17.2 in; 1.43 ft), while females can reach 41.6 cm (16.4 in; 1.36 ft).

== Distribution and habitat ==
The enigma garden eel is found in the western Pacific Ocean, including Indonesia and New Guinea. It dwells at a depth range of 3 to 25 m (9.8 to 82.0 ft), and inhabits regions with dark, silty sand and seagrass (Holiphila species). Males can reach a maximum total length of 43.7 cm (17.2 in; 1.43 ft), while females can reach 41.6 cm (16.4 in; 1.36 ft).
