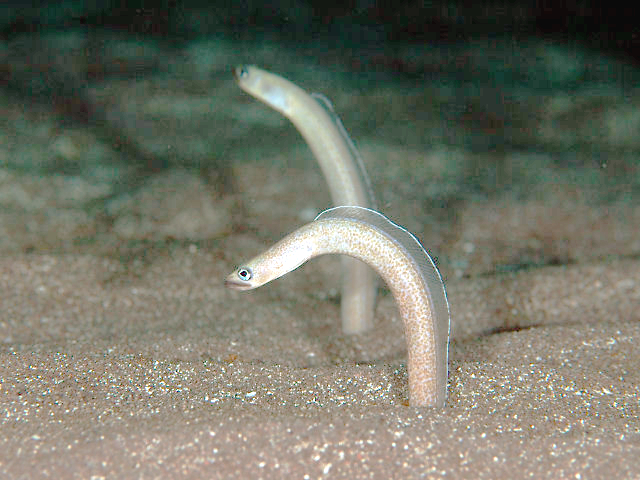

Conservation status
- Least Concern (IUCN 3.1)

Scientific classification
- Kingdom: Animalia
- Phylum: Chordata
- Class: Actinopterygii
- Order: Anguilliformes
- Family: Congridae
- Genus: Gorgasia
- Species: G. taiwanensis

Binomial name
- Gorgasia taiwanensis Shao, 1990

= Sharp-nose garden eel =

Species of fish

The sharp-nose garden eel (Gorgasia taiwanensis) is an eel in the family Congridae (conger/garden eels). It was described by Shao Kwang-Tsao in 1990. It is a marine, subtropical eel which is known from Taiwan (from which its species epithet is derived) and southern Japan, in the northwestern Pacific Ocean. It is non-migratory, and dwells at a depth range of 14 to 22 metres (46 to 72 ft). Males can reach a maximum total length of 74.1 centimetres (29.2 in). It can be identified by the shape of its snout.
