= Gorgasia galzini =

Conservation status
- Least Concern (IUCN 3.1)

Scientific classification
- Kingdom: Animalia
- Phylum: Chordata
- Class: Actinopterygii
- Order: Anguilliformes
- Family: Congridae
- Genus: Gorgasia
- Species: G. galzini

Binomial name
- Gorgasia galzini Castle & J. E. Randall, 1999

Species of fish

Gorgasia galzini, the speckled garden eel or Galzin's garden eel, is a species of garden eel. This marine fish lives in the Pacific Ocean, where found at depths of 17–53 m (56–174 ft) from Guam and the Coral Sea to the Society Islands. It reaches 53 cm (21 in) in length. Like other garden eels, this species lives in groups in sandy areas. The eels peep outside and look like very thin stems emerging from the sand. When possible predators get close to them, they retreat and disappear in the sand.

== Etymology ==
The fish is named in honor of fish ecologist René Galzin (b. 1950), who provided many eel specimens for study and valuable information on the eel's biology.
