= Wolfgang Schleidt =

Austrian scientist (1927–2026)

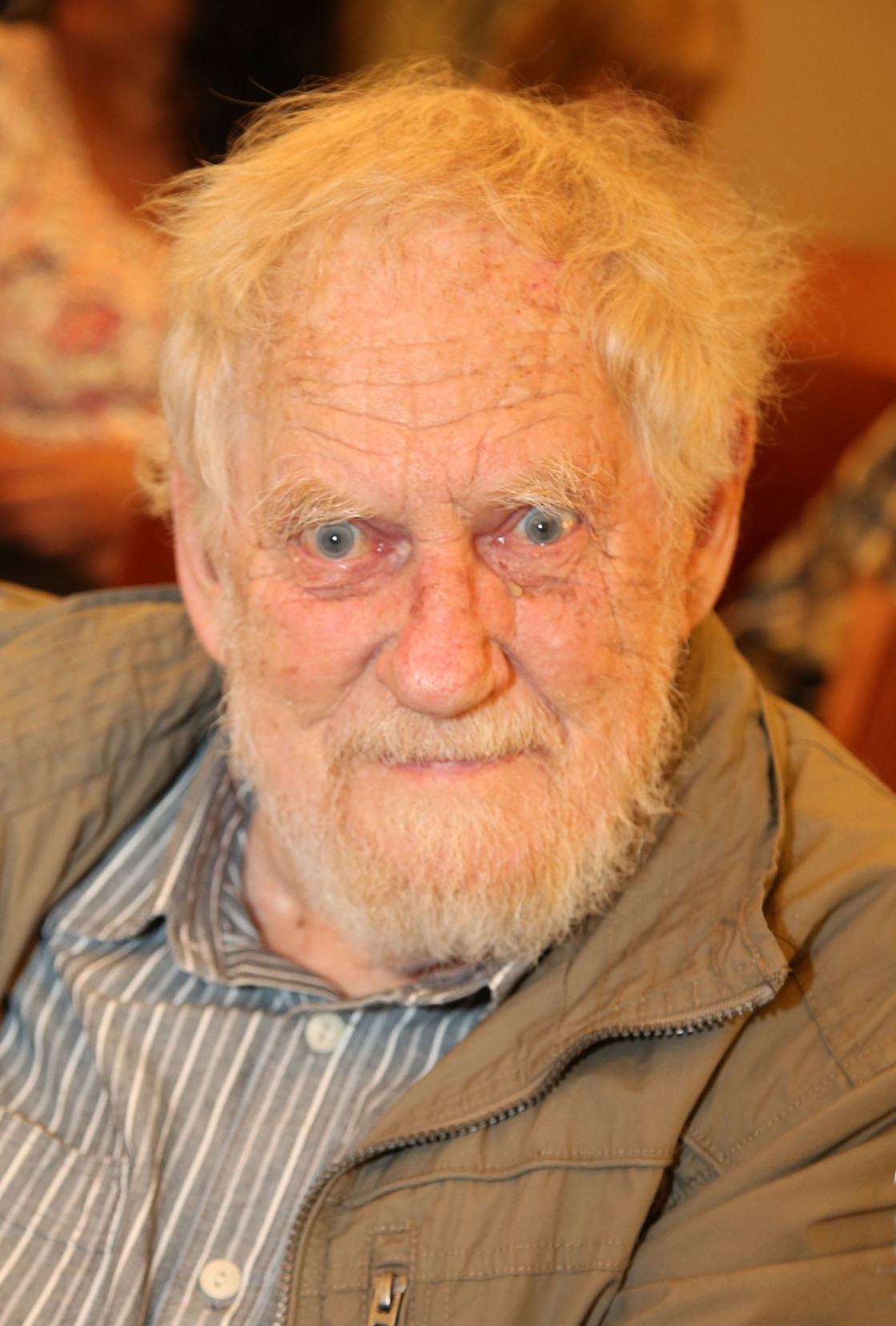
- Born: 18 December 1927; Vienna, Austria
- Died: 7 June 2026 (aged 98); Moosbrunn, Lower Austria, Austria
- Scientific career
- Fields: Zoololgy
- Workplaces: University of Maryland; Duke University

Wolfgang M. Schleidt (18 December 1927 – 7 June 2026) was an Austrian scientist who specialised in the areas of bioacoustics, communication and classical ethology. He was assistant to Konrad Lorenz (1950 – 1965), professor of zoology at the University of Maryland (1965–1985) and director at the Konrad Lorenz Institute for Ethology, Vienna of the Austrian Academy of Sciences. He was an early pioneer of bioacoustics and of the quantitative analysis of behavior.

== Early life ==
Schleidt grew up in Vienna, Austria, and was drafted into the German Army at age seventeen during World War II. In 1944, Schleidt sustained an injury that crippled his left hand and recovered in an army hospital in Memmingen. His crippled hand disqualified him for medical school (his preferred academic institution), so he decided to study biology and anthropology with a special emphasis on sensory and behavioral physiology.

Schleidt sustained hearing loss during an air raid by the U.S. Air Force that he survived. As a result, he attained increased awareness of the high-pitched vocalizations of mice in the range between 10 and 20 kHz. Schleidt later described the event as a "blessing in disguise", since his hearing for tones at the top of the tone scale were perfectly preserved and his deafness to lower tones meant that high tones came through extremely clear.

At the end of the war, Schleidt began studying zoology and anthropology in Vienna and became one of the first employees at the Biological Station Wilhelminenberg, founded in 1945 by Otto Koenig and Lilli Koenig. His duties included raising a young kestrel, which he had to feed with mice he caught. He could hear the high-pitched squeaks of the mice, which neither Otto Koenig nor Irenäus Eibl-Eibesfeldt, who was also studying in Vienna at the time, were able to hear. Schleidt therefore decided to construct an apparatus which he could use to convert high-frequency tones into a frequency range that could be heard by a normal human ear.

In order to prove the efficacy of ultrasound, Schleidt started to develop and build his own electronic gadgets, becoming a pioneer of bioacoustics and animal communication. At that time, the technology for electronic sound recording and loudspeakers was limited to a range 100 Hz to 8 kHz.

After Konrad Lorenz returned to his family villa in Altenberg in Lower Austria from Soviet captivity in 1948, Schleidt was allowed to move in there and – initially unpaid – to help convert the five-story building into a zoological institute. He was able to continue his studies on the subject of sound perception, also devoting himself determining how mammals that are blind in infancy locate their mother's teets.

In 1949, he created his first functioning device for recording and registering high-frequency mouse sounds from discarded radio parts. Using a whistle, he was also able to test the reaction of his mice to a man-made signal. He succeeded in proving "that ultrasound is the language of mice [...] that the purpose of their squeaks is communication." Until then, the echolocation of bats was already known and that dogs are guided by whistling in the ultrasonic range. However, Schleidt opened the door to a new field of bioacoustics, with his 1948 publication High Frequency Sounds in Mice. The circuit diagrams of his apparatus were also published two years later. For his doctoral thesis, Schleidt used mice to study communication between mothers and newborn mice, which quickly made him an internationally recognized expert in ultrasound communication in rodents. In May 1950, Prechtl and Schleidt described the now well-known, nearly identically search pattern infants of several mammal species make in search of teats by swinging the head back and forth - a behavioral pattern that is almost identical in mice, rats, and humans.

== Career ==
Konrad Lorenz became Schleidt's most influential mentor. In 1950, when Lorenz became the director of his own research facility of the Max-Planck Gesellschaft in Buldern (Westphalia, Germany), he asked Schleidt to become his lead assistant. Schleidt served as the supervisor of construction for the newly founded Max-Planck-Institute for Behavioral Physiology in Bavaria and is credited with naming the surrounding area "Seewiesen". Schleidt, along with his wife Margret and daughter Christiane, and a flock of 400 wild geese became Seewiesen's first residents. During his tenure at Seewiesen, he started his critical review of the basic concepts of ethology, the study of animal behavior. Schleidt was a loyal friend of Konrad Lorenz and after his death defended against attacks regarding his political past.

In the following ten years, Schleidt researched which characteristics ducks, geese, and turkeys use to recognize predators, as well as the courtship movements of turkeys. He published quantitative studies of their innate behavior and his subsequent findings on the role of signals in maintaining social bonds received widespread acclaim.

Schleidt moved to America in 1964 and after serving one year as a visiting research professor at Duke University (1964–65) with Peter H. Klopfer and Donald K. Adams, Schleidt became a professor of zoology at the University of Maryland (1965–85) and head of the ethology department, where he continued his research in quantitative ethology and animal communication. Schleidt later returned to Europe and became a director at the Institute for Comparative Behavior Research of the Austrian Academy of Sciences in 1985. He retired in 1992, but continued teaching at the University of Vienna until 2003.

Schleidt's criticism of the prevailing theories on the domestication of dogs and his reference to the possibility of a co-evolution of humans and wolves found a surprisingly wide echo in 2003.

He continued working independently and publishing writings on his farm in Moosbrunn, Lower Austria.

== Death ==
Schleidt died on 7 June 2026, at the age of 98.

== Selected works ==
- W. M. Schleidt: "Reactions to high-frequency sounds in rodents". In: The natural sciences. Vol. 39, No. 3, 1952, pp. 69–70 doi:10.1007/BF00596819.
- H. M. Zippelius, W. M. Schleidt: "Ultrasonic sounds in young mice". In: The natural sciences. Volume 43, 1956, pp. 502–502. doi:10.1007/BF00632534.
- W. M. Schleidt: "Reactions of turkeys to flying birds of prey and attempts to analyze their AAM's". In: Journal of Animal Psychology. Vol. 18, 1961, pp. 534–560. doi:10.1111/j.1439-0310.1961.tb00241.x.
- D. Burkhardt, W. M. Schleidt, H. Altner: "Signals in the animal world". Heinz Moos Verlag, Munich 1966, ISBN 3-89164-053-6.
- P. H. Klopfer, W. M. Schleidt: Ecology and behavior. Psychological and ethological aspects of ecology. Fischer, Stuttgart 1968.
- W.M. Schleidt: "How "fixed" is the fixed action pattern?" In: Journal of Animal Psychology. Vol. 36, 1974, pp. 184–211. doi:10.1111/j.1439-0310.1974.tb02131.x.
- W M Schleidt, J N Crawley: "Patterns in the behavior of organisms". In: Journal of Social and Biological Structures. Vol. 3, No. 1, 1980, pp. 1–15 doi:10.1016/0140-1750(80)90016-0.
- Schleidt WM, Yakalis G, Donnelly M, McGarry J: "A proposal for a standard ethogram, exemplified by an ethogram of the blue-breasted quail (Coturnix-chinensis)". In: Journal of Animal Psychology. Vol. 64, No. 3-4, 1984, pp. 193–220. doi:10.1111/j.1439-0310.1984.tb00360.x.
- W.M. Schleidt: "Learning and the description of the environment". In: T D Johnston, AT Pietrewicz (eds): Issues in the ecological study of learning. Lawrence Erlbaum Associates, Hillsdale, New Jersey 1985, pp. 305–325.
- W. M. Schleidt (ed.): "The circle around Konrad Lorenz. Ideas, hypotheses, views. Festschrift on the occasion of K. Lorenz's 85th birthday" on November 7, 1988. Paul Parey, Berlin/ Hamburg 1988, ISBN 3-489-63336-9.
- W. M. Schleidt: "Impressive uniforms: clothing as a signal". In: M. Liedtke (ed.): Kulturethologie. About the basics of cultural developments. Commemorative Otto Koenig. Realis Verlag, Munich 1994, ISBN 3-930048-05-1, pp. 256–281.
- W. M. Schleidt: "Epilogue: Who really was the father of the gray geese?" In: K. Lorenz (ed.): Actually, I wanted to become a wild goose. Out of my life. Piper, Munich, Zurich 2003, ISBN 3-492-04540-5, pp. 97–122.
- W M Schleidt, MD Shalter, H Moura-Neto: "The hawk/goose story: The classical ethological experiments of Lorenz and Tinbergen, revisited". In: Journal of Comparative Psychology. Volume 125, No. 2, 2011, pp. 121–133 doi:10.1037/a0022068 and doi:10.1037/a0022068.supp, full text (PDF).
