= Heteroconger tomberua =

Conservation status
- Data Deficient (IUCN 3.1)

Scientific classification
- Kingdom: Animalia
- Phylum: Chordata
- Class: Actinopterygii
- Order: Anguilliformes
- Family: Congridae
- Genus: Heteroconger
- Species: H. tomberua

Binomial name
- Heteroconger tomberua Castle & Randall, 1999

Species of fish

Heteroconger tomberua is an eel in the family Congridae (conger/garden eels). It was described by Peter Henry John Castle and John Ernest Randall in 1995. It is a marine, tropical eel which is known from the western central Pacific Ocean, including Fiji and possibly (based on leptocephali) New Caledonia, the Philippines, the Nicobar Islands, Papua New Guinea, and Sri Lanka. It is known to dwell at a depth of 36 m (118 ft). Males can reach a maximum total length of 42.8 cm (16.9 in; 1.40 ft).
