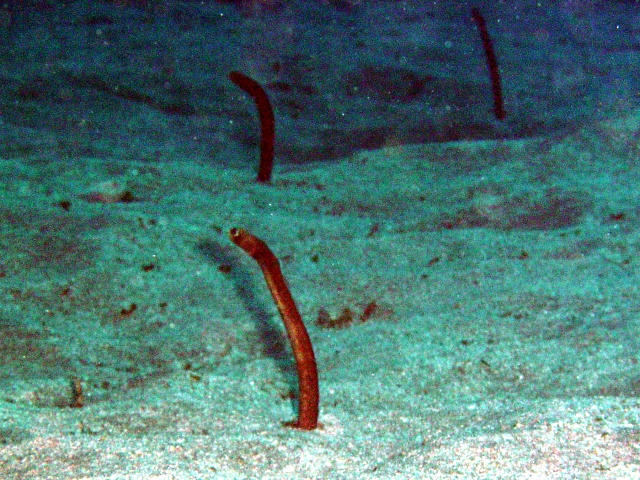

Conservation status
- Least Concern (IUCN 3.1)

Scientific classification
- Kingdom: Animalia
- Phylum: Chordata
- Class: Actinopterygii
- Division: Teleostei
- Order: Anguilliformes
- Family: Congridae
- Genus: Heteroconger
- Species: H. longissimus

Binomial name
- Heteroconger longissimus Günther, 1870

Synonyms
- Taenioconger longissimus (Günther, 1870); Nystactes halis Böhlke, 1957; Heteroconger halis (Böhlke, 1957); Nystactichthys halis (Böhlke, 1957); Taenioconger halis (Böhlke, 1957); Nystatichthys halis (Böhlke, 1957) (misspelling)

= Brown garden eel =

Species of fish

The brown garden eel (Heteroconger longissimus), also known simply as the garden eel, is an eel in the family Congridae (conger/garden eels). It was described by Albert Günther in 1870. It is a tropical, marine eel which is known from the eastern and western Atlantic Ocean, including Madeira, the Canary Islands, Senegal, the Bahamas, the Florida Keys, the Caribbean, Mexico, Belize, Honduras, and Brazil. It dwells at a depth of 10–60 m, most commonly between 20 and 60 m, and leads a nonmigratory, benthic lifestyle, inhabiting reefs in colonies. They likely spawn during the warm season. The larval state of development lasts for about 6–8 months. Adult males can reach a maximum total length of 51 centimetres (20 in; 1.67 ft).

The brown garden eel's diet consists primarily of detritus and plankton.
