= Wulf Schiefenhövel =

German medical anthropologist

Wulf Schiefenhövel (born 2 October 1943) is a German medical anthropologist. He has been associated with the Max Planck Institute for Ornithology (the former Max Planck Institute for Behavioral Physiology) since 1975, and is now the head of their Human Ethology department.
