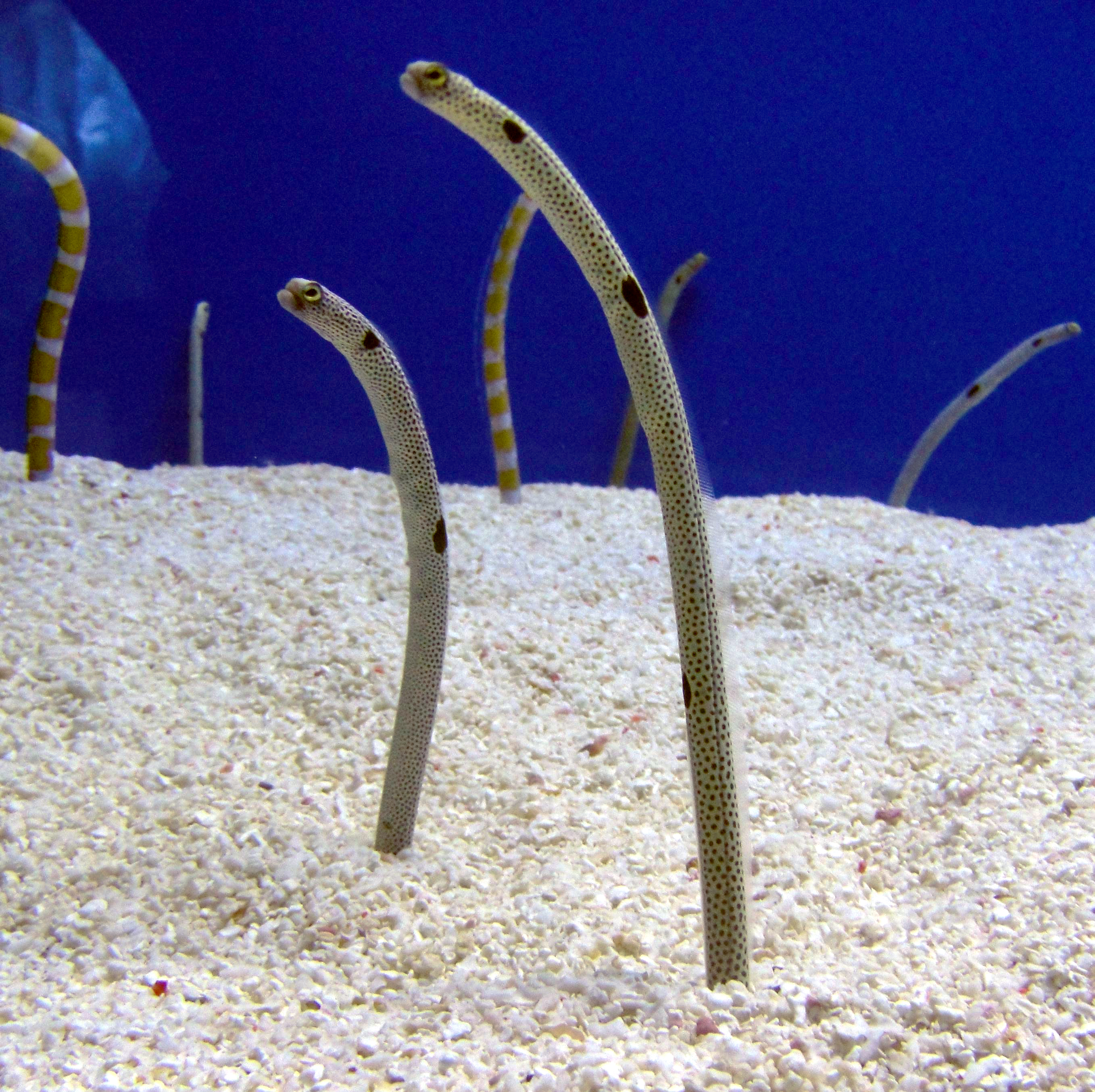
- The spotted Heteroconger hassi and striped Gorgasia preclara

Scientific classification
- Kingdom: Animalia
- Phylum: Chordata
- Class: Actinopterygii
- Division: Teleostei
- Order: Anguilliformes
- Family: Congridae
- Subfamily: Heterocongrinae; Günther, 1870

Genera
- see text

= Heterocongrinae =

Garden eels

Subfamily of Congridae

The garden eels are infaunal ray-finned fish of the subfamily Heterocongrinae in the conger eel family Congridae. The majority of the 36 known species of garden eels live in the Indo-Pacific, but can be found in warm ocean water worldwide. These small benthic eels live in burrows on the sea floor and get their name from the behavior of poking their heads out of the burrows to feed on plankton while most of their bodies remain hidden. Since they tend to live in groups, the many eel heads "growing" out from the sea floor resemble shoots of grass in a garden. They vary in color and size depending on the species. The largest species reaches about 120 cm (47 in) in length, but most species do not surpass 60 cm (24 in). Garden eel colonies can grow as large as one acre in surface area and number up to several thousand individuals.

== Genera ==
Hetercongrinae contains the following two genera:

- Gorgasia (Fourteen species) Meek & Hildebrand, 1923
- Heteroconger (Twenty-four species) Bleeker, 1868
