= Wolfgang Klausewitz =

German zoologist, ichthyologist, marine biologist, and biohistorian (1921–2018)

- Born: 20 July 1922; Berlin, Germany
- Died: 31 August 2018 (aged 96); Bad Homburg, Germany

Wolfgang Klausewitz (20 July 1921 – 31 August 2018) was a German zoologist, ichthyologist, marine biologist and biohistorian.

== Early life ==
Klausewitz was born in Berlin. He attended school in Berlin, then, in 1941, was sent as a soldier to North Africa, France, and Italy. He was captured by U.S. forces in 1945. From 1946 to 1947 he worked for the Field Investigations Agency.

== Professional career ==
Between 1947 and 1952, he studied zoology, botany, anthropology, and psychology at the University of Frankfurt receiving his Ph.D. 1952 supervised by the herpetologist Robert Mertens. In 1948, he married Rita Willmann, who died in 1995. In 1954, he was put in charge of the fish section of the Naturmuseum Senckenberg. In 1971 he became head of the department zoology I (vertebrates) and 1980 deputy director of the Museum. He retired 1987 but remained active as an emeritus in the field of ichthyology and history of natural science.

Klausewitz participated in several expeditions, including the 1957 "Xarifa" expedition under Hans Hass. He was president of the Deutscher Museumsbund from 1975 to 1983.

Klausewitz died on August 31, 2018.

== Taxon named in his honor ==
Two eels are named after him.

- Klausewitz's garden eel Gorgasia klausewitzi Quéro & Saldanha, 1995
- The Galapagos garden eel Heteroconger klausewitzi. (Eibl-Eibesfeldt & Köster, 1983)

And

- The sea bass Plectranthias klausewitzi Zajonz, 2006
- A fresh water Leporinus Leporinus klausewitzi Géry, 1960 are named in his honor.

== Taxon described by him ==
- See Category:Taxa named by Wolfgang Klausewitz
