= Irenäus Eibl-Eibesfeldt =

Austrian ethnologist in the field of human ethology (1928–2018)

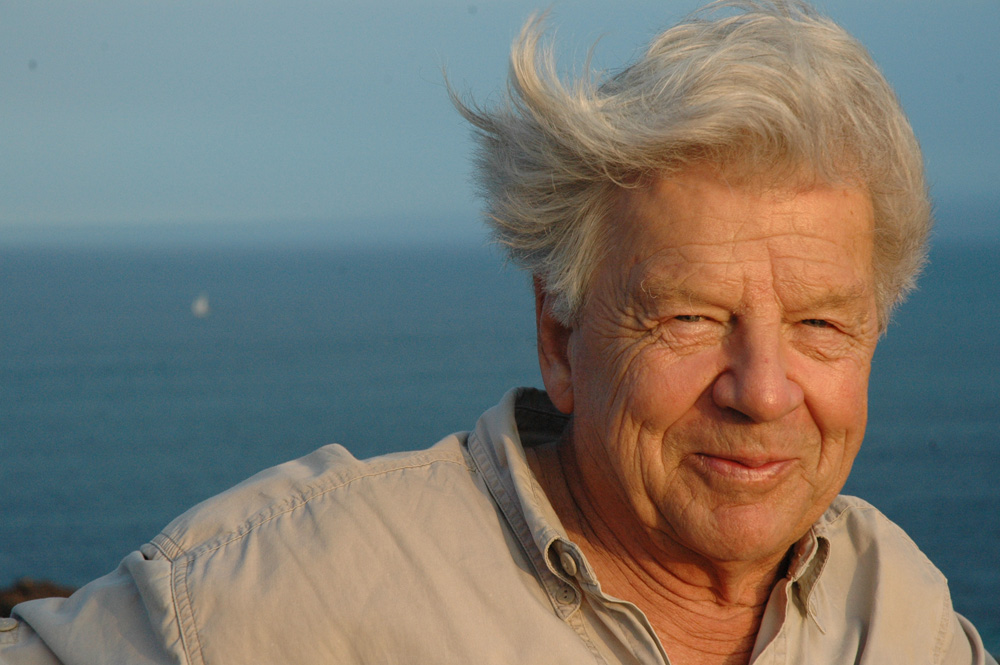
- Born: 15 June 1928; Vienna, First Austrian Republic
- Died: 2 June 2018 (aged 89); Starnberg, Germany
- Education: LMU Munich
- Scientific career
- Fields: Ethology
- Workplaces: University of Vienna

Irenäus Eibl-Eibesfeldt (German pronunciation: [irɛˈnɛːʊs ˌaɪ̯bl̩ʔˈaɪ̯bəsfɛlt]; 15 June 1928 – 2 June 2018) was an Austrian zoologist, evolutionary biologist, behavioral scientist, and ethologist in the field of human ethology. In authoring the book titled "Human Ethology," he applied ethology to humans by studying them in a perspective more common to volumes studying animal behavior.

Together with Konrad Lorenz, Hans Hass and Otto Koenig, he studied animal and human behavior and was a passionate advocate for nature conservation. He was the first to describe the cleaning symbiosis of reef groupers, the tournament behavior of marine iguanas and the schooling behavior of fish, as well as the behavior of certain species such as the cleaner wrasse ("Labroides dimidiatus") and the cleaner mimic Aspidontus taeniatus. On the Galapagos, he described several subspecies of the sea iguana ("Amblyrhynchus cristatus") and, in the Indian Ocean, several species of tube eels.

Among the achievements of his work are the creation of the world's largest film documentary series on human behavior in a cross-cultural context, the discovery of universals in human biological and cultural behavior, the establishment of a research station on the Galapagos Islands, and the establishment of human ethology as an independent branch of science.

== Early life ==
Born in Vienna, Austria, Irenäus Eibl-Eibesfeldt was a descendant of the ancient Regensburg knightly family Eibl von Eibesfeldt. His father, Anton Eibl-Eibesfeldt, held a doctorate in botany and taught as a professor of botany at the Federal Higher Teaching and Research Station for Viticulture, Fruit Growing, and Horticulture in Klosterneuburg, and his mother was a trained art historian. Irenäus Eibl-Eibesfeldt grew up in Kierling (now a district of Klosterneuburg), and in 1939, the family returned to Vienna. He began taking an interest in zoology as early as the age of ten and, thanks to his parents, had access to magazines such as Kosmos. His father died in March 1941 from complications resulting from a war injury sustained during World War I, and in turn, his school performance began to decline. He was enrolled in a boarding school.

After his entire class was drafted into military service in January 1944, he became an air force and anti-aircraft assistant in Breitenlee at the age of 15, following four weeks of training. During periods without air raid alerts, the students in Breitenlee continued to be taught by their teachers, which contributed to his being certified as having attended seven years of high school and being awarded the wartime high school diploma. As a result, he was able to begin his studies in the natural sciences at the University of Vienna—which had been largely bombed but had just reopened—as early as May 1945.

== Education and Work ==
Eibl-Eibesfeldt studied biology, physics, zoology, and botany at the University of Vienna from 1945 to 1949. He was a student of Ludwig von Bertalanffy and Wilhelm von Marinelli, and it was through Marinelli's zoology research group that he met Otto Koenig, with whom he worked from 1946 to 1949. From 1946 to 1948, he was a research associate at the Biological Station Wilhelminenberg near Vienna and became a research associate of the Institute for Comparative Behavior Studies in Altenberg near Vienna with Konrad Lorenz in 1949.

The pond on the grounds of the “Wilhelminenberg Station” played a key role in Eibl-Eibesfeldt earning his Ph.D. in Vienna in 1949—following his teacher certification exams in natural history and physics with a study on the mating biology of the common toad (Bufo bufo). In his barracks, he raised a young badger and described, among other things, its play behavior, and after numerous mice sought shelter in the barracks during the winter, he conducted his first study on the behavior of rodents.

At the same time, a close friendship developed between Eibl-Eibesfeldt and Lorenz. At Lorenz's initiative, he moved in 1951, together with Wolfgang Schleidt, to the newly established Research Center for Comparative Behavioral Research at the then named Max Planck Institute for Marine Biology in Buldern, Westphalia, as a research assistant. From 1956 onward, he worked at the newly founded Max Planck Institute for Behavioral Physiology in Seewiesen, Bavaria.

In 1953 and 1954, he took part in the first Xarifa Expeditions to the Caribbean and the Galápagos Islands, led by Hans Hass. He was fascinated by the biodiversity of the local ecosystems and drafted a memorandum on the protection of the islands. In 1957, he undertook a second trip to the Galápagos on behalf of UNESCO and the IUCN to survey and document the ecological situation. His initiatives led to the founding of the Charles Darwin Research Station on Santa Cruz and the establishment of protected areas.

From 1957 to 1958, he served as scientific director of Hans Hass's second Xarifa expedition to the Indian Ocean, and in 1961, he held a visiting professorship at the University of Chicago (Department of Psychology). In 1963, he qualified as a professor in zoology (behavioral biology) at LMU Munich, initially teaching as a private lecturer. In 1969, he was appointed adjunct professor of zoology there, and in 1970, a full professor.

== Further Studies ==
Even during the two Xarifa expeditions, questions of communication were the focus of his interest. He began by studying such diverse phenomena as the tournament fights of Galápagos marine iguanas, the cleaning symbioses of coral fish that he discovered, and the courtship and brood-relieving ceremonies of frigatebirds and flightless cormorants from a common theoretical perspective. Other key areas of his interest included questions of behavioral development and ontogenesis. His experiments made a decisive contribution to resolving the debate over the innate nature of mammalian behavior.

After twenty years of research in animal ethology and marine biology, Eibl-Eibesfeldt turned his attention to the study of human behavior in the 1960s. His work focused on the question of to what extent hypotheses regarding the phylogeny of behavior could also be applied to human behavior. During numerous research stays in Africa, South America, and East Asia, he studied, among other things, the facial expressions of various tribes and identified universals—that is, universal and presumably innate commonalities—such as in the expression of anger, grief, surprise, embarrassment, joy, and even in greeting.

His studies of people born deaf and blind and his cross-cultural research program on human behavior made a decisive contribution to the establishment of human ethology as a branch of behavioral biology and a subdiscipline of ethology. In 1984, he published the first textbook on human ethology (“Die Biologie des menschlichen Verhaltens", 5th edition 2004), which appeared in English translation in 1989.

As part of a long-term project to study human behavior, he documented on film and audio unscripted everyday social interactions, rituals, and other activities of people in various cultures, which he visited at regular intervals over a period of forty years: the Kalahari Bushmen, the Himba (Namibia), the Yanomami (Upper Orinoco, Venezuela), the Eipo (West New Guinea), and the Trobriand Islanders (Papua New Guinea). Until 2014, the documentation of this research—which continues to this day—was housed in the Human Ethology Film Archive at the Max Planck Society in Andechs; since mid-2014, it has been held by the [Senckenberg Society for Nature Research in Frankfurt. A total of 350 kilometers of Eibl-Eibesfeldt's analog film material is archived there.

== Human Communication and Cooperation ==
In his research on animal ethology, Eibl-Eibesfeldt had already specialized in questions of intraspecific and interspecific communication and the behaviors associated with them (e.g., ritualization). From the very beginning, nonverbal communication was also a central focus of his research in human ethology. Beyond the repertoire of facial expressions and gestures, the context of the situation always came into focus, allowing for a social interpretation of events and opening up a broader thematic perspective: Giving and taking, human willingness to cooperate, exchange rituals, greeting rituals, structures of community formation, familiarity and artificial kinship systems, strategies for coping with conflict and anxiety, and the social role of festivals. The antagonism between the pursuit of rank and dominance on the one hand and behaviors of love and care on the other was repeatedly highlighted as the cornerstones of human social behavior. Above all, the theoretical grounding of prosocial dispositions in humanity's phylogenetic heritage stood in contradiction to the socially critical theories prevalent at the time. According to these theories, the capacities for cooperation and care were solely the result of socialization processes, without taking biological foundations into account.

== Cultural influences on Human Behavior ==
Beyond behavior, therefore, human emotionality, concepts of perception, and processes of cognition and consciousness-formation are also part of the theoretical and research spectrum of human ethology. The transition to cultural ethology proved inevitable from the very beginning. Many of the similarities between phylogenetic and cultural ritualization are the result of similar demands from the environment and thus of selection pressures acting in the same way (analogy, convergence). As early as 1970, "Love and Hate, The Natural History of Behavior Patterns" was published, followed in 1975 by “War and Peace from the Perspective of Behavioral Research.” Both remain long-selling titles and classics of behavioral research to this day.

The question of how behaviors that are phylogenetically acquired became established and persisted in humans under culturally altered environmental conditions occupied Irenäus Eibl-Eibesfeldt well into his research on modern social behavior. Adaptation can be the result of phylogenetic, cultural-historical, and individual-historical development. If the survival of a species is defined by its adaptive value to its environment, the question of the effectiveness of selective pressures arises. This corresponds to an evolutionary biological approach. Since the acquisition of information about our environment involves perceptual processes, adaptations must also be considered in the sensory realm. The action systems underlying a behavior require a longer period of time for their emergence and the acquisition of information than would be necessary for learning processes. In this context, one can examine the immediate (proximate) causes and triggers underlying a behavior that set the physiological interaction in motion, or inquire into the (ultimate) function that a behavior fulfills.

The cultural evolution of human socialization into larger groups brought with it, among other things, a pressure to accelerate that human adaptability could only partially withstand. Building upon older structures of the repertoire of expression and behavior which date back to the long period during which humans lived culturally as hunter-gatherers in small groups, proved to be an advantage. Emotionality is one of the oldest structures to which modern human behavior can connect. Bonding and caregiving behavior can be traced back to brood care, which according to Irenäus Eibl-Eibesfeldt, is a “defining moment” in behavioral evolution. Much of this, however, turns out to be archaic baggage with the character of a relic.

== Universals of Human Behavior ==
What might be termed research into universals thus concerns both innate and certain aspects of human cultural behavior: the need for cultural distinctiveness, identification, and differentiation; the creation of myths; susceptibility to indoctrination regarding group values and the development of specialized forms; as well as the basic emotions and behaviors of fear, joy, and sorrow, love, and hate. Language, play, and flirtation behaviors, dress customs, greeting rituals, the aforementioned exchange and kinship systems, as well as monument culture and symbolic identification have been integral to this field from the very beginning and have been further reinforced through involvement in relevant academic and working groups. The focus was always on a universal grammar of human behavior underlying the cultural variations. Collaboration with ethnologists, medical professionals, linguists, psychologists, and cultural scientists proved not only necessary but also highly fruitful.

In his *Biology of Human Behavior*, Eibl-Eibesfeldt discusses universal behavioral dispositions in detail. He argues that many of these dispositions are innate, but do not necessarily dictate exactly how they should be expressed; rather, they are expressed and weighted differently across cultures. He lists the following among humans’ universal needs or appetites:

1. Nutrition: Hunger, thirst
2. Weather: Protection from heat, cold, rain, wind, sun
3. Nature: Preference for park-like landscapes with clusters of trees and open grassy areas (savanna biotope), need for closeness to nature, plant growth (phytophilia), sun, flowing water, caves, cliffs, views, manageable terrain
4. Territoriality: Need for territorial possession of a specific area and the establishment of a territorial bond
5. Movement: Need for physical activity (running, swimming, walking)
6. Sociability: Seeking closeness to people, need for contact and belonging to a community, but also a tendency to avoid people
7. Partner bonding: Sexual drive, romantic love
8. Care: Parental care for offspring, need for security
9. Power: Striving for dominance
10. Rank: Need to gain prestige, but also willingness to submit, subordinate oneself, or accept leadership if necessary
11. Aggression: Appetite for fighting (primary drive or secondary motivation)

== Philosophy of Science and Methods ==
The epistemological foundations of human ethology are critical realism and modern evolutionary theory. As early as 1872, in *The Expression of the Emotions in Man and Animals*, Charles Darwin pointed out universals in human facial expressions, as well as certain homologies in the facial expressions of chimpanzees and humans.

Parallels between natural and cultural evolution can be expressed in the form of analogies. The idea that similar processes arise due to similar selective pressures (convergence) plays a role here. This does not imply that human cultural history is a carbon copy of natural history, but rather that similar processes emerge due to shared conditions. Questions regarding function and development can be posed for cultural behavioral patterns just as they can for phylogenetic ones. Methodologically, human ethology adopts the established procedures of ethology: creating statistically analyzable datasets from field observations (documentation and description), a comparative morphological approach, and experimental methods. Three areas of investigation proved particularly relevant: research on humans in early childhood, on children with sensory deprivation (the blind, the deaf-blind), and on human social behavior in a cross-cultural comparison. In this context, the focus was on film documentation and its analysis. Methodologically, human ethology has also aligned itself with many related disciplines, particularly regarding the statistical analysis of data.

== Scientific Institutions ==
Eibl-Eibesfeldt was a member of numerous scientific institutions in Germany and abroad, including the German Zoological Society, the German Academy of Sciences Leopoldina, the American Association for the Advancement of Science, the Australian Forensic Society, the South West African Scientific Society, and the Polish Academy of Sexual Research. From 1986 to 1993, he served as president of the International Society for Human Ethology. In 1990, he was among the founders of the European Academy of Sciences and Arts and the Konrad Lorenz Society for Environmental and Behavioral Science. For a time, he also served as director of the Ludwig Boltzmann Institute for Urban Ethology in Vienna, which he co-founded. Since 1998, he has also been a member of the advisory board of the Heinz Sielmann Foundation. He was a founding member of the P.E.N. Club Liechtenstein.

== Honours and awards ==
- 1971 – Gold Wilhelm Bölsche Medal of the Kosmos Society for services to the popularisation of science
- 1977 – Elected corresponding member of the German Academy of Natural Scientists Leopoldina
- 1981 – Burda Prize for Communication Research
- 1988 – Philip Morris Research Prize
- 1989 – Gold Medal of Honour of the City of Vienna
- 1994 – Honorary doctorate in philosophy, University of Salamanca
- 1995 – Grand Cross of Merit of the Order of Merit of the Federal Republic of Germany
- 1996 – National Park Dragonfly in Gold with Rubies and Diamonds for outstanding contributions to international nature conservation
- 1996 – Schwenk Environmental Prize of the City of Ebersberg
- 1997 – Gold Medal of the Dres. Haackert Foundation
- 1997 – Bavarian Order of Merit
- 1997 – Annual Prize of the Foundation for Western Reflection (STAB), Zurich
- 1998 – Austrian Cross of Honour for Science and Art, 1st Class
- 1998 – Werner and Inge Grüter Prize for Science Communication
- 1999 – Premio Cátedra Santiago Grisolía
- 2001 – Heinz Sielmann Foundation Honorary Award
- 2003 – Golden Medal for Services to the State of Vienna
- 2005 – Honorary doctorate in psychology, University of Bologna
- 2007 – Commander's Cross of the National Order of Merit of the Republic of Ecuador
- 2011 – Premio Nonino (Culture Prize)

== See also ==
- Category:Taxa named by Irenäus Eibl-Eibesfeldt
