= Frozen Evolution =

2008 book by Jaroslav Flegr

- Author: Jaroslav Flegr
- Language: Czech, English
- Subject: Biology, Evolution
- Publisher: Univerzita Karlova
- Publication date: 2008
- Pages: 226
- ISBN: 978-80-86561-73-8
- Website: www.frozenevolution.com

Frozen Evolution is a 2008 book written by parasitologist Jaroslav Flegr, which aims to explain modern developments in evolutionary biology. It also contains information boxes which clarify important topics in science like peer review, scientific journals, citation metrics, philosophy of science, paradigm shifts, and Occam's razor. Flegr's previous research in toxoplasmosis is also mentioned.

The book also discusses Flegr's model of "frozen plasticity," a hypothesis which describes a possible mechanism for the evolution of adaptive traits. This hypothesis proposes that natural selection can only explain adaptation for a limited range of conditions, for instance when populations are genetically homogeneous. He describes frozen plasticity as being more general, and maintains that it better explains the origin of adaptive traits in genetically heterogeneous populations of sexual reproducing organisms. His hypothesis of frozen plasticity is an extension of Niles Eldredge and Stephen Jay Gould's theory of punctuated equilibrium, which describes the history of most fossil species as being relatively stable for millions of years, later punctuated by swift periods of evolutionary change during episodes of speciation. It also draws upon John Maynard Smith's concept of an evolutionarily stable strategy.

Biologist Brian K. Hall described the book as broad and integrative, but also combative, "verging on the disrespectful". Biologist Dan Graur described the book as "sloppily written, unprofessionally translated, inadequately conceived, improperly edited, dubiously syntaxed, and horribly pompous and tedious stream-of-consciousness monologue masquerading as a scholarly work."

The book was dedicated to the memory of Stephen Jay Gould and John Maynard Smith, "the two most influential evolutionary biologists of the end of the late 20th century".

== Reviews ==
- Graur, Dan (December 2010). "Frozen Evolution by Jaroslav Flegr". The Quarterly Review of Biology. 85 (4): 501–502. doi:10.1086/656859. ISSN 0033-5770. JSTOR 10.1086/656859.
- Hall, Brian K. (February 2009). "A review of Frozen Evolution by Jaroslav Flegr". Evolution & Development. 11 (1): 126–129. doi:10.1111/j.1525-142X.2008.00310.x. ISSN 1520-541X. ResearchGate 249962108.
- Østman, Bjørn (13 December 2010). "Frozen Evolution book review". Pleiotropy (Blog post).
- Reeve, Catherine S. (December 2010). "Frozen Evolution by Jaroslav Flegr" (PDF). Human Ethology Bulletin. 25 (4). Tucson, Arizona: International Society for Human Ethology: 5–8. ISSN 0739-2036.
- Zima, Jan (2009). "Frozen Evolution by J. Flegr" (PDF). Folia Zoologica. 58 (2). Brno, Czech Republic: Institute of Vertebrate Biology of the Czech Academy of Sciences: 240. ISSN 0139-7893. EBSCOhost 44316968.
