= Wallace Craig =

American psychologist (1876–1954)

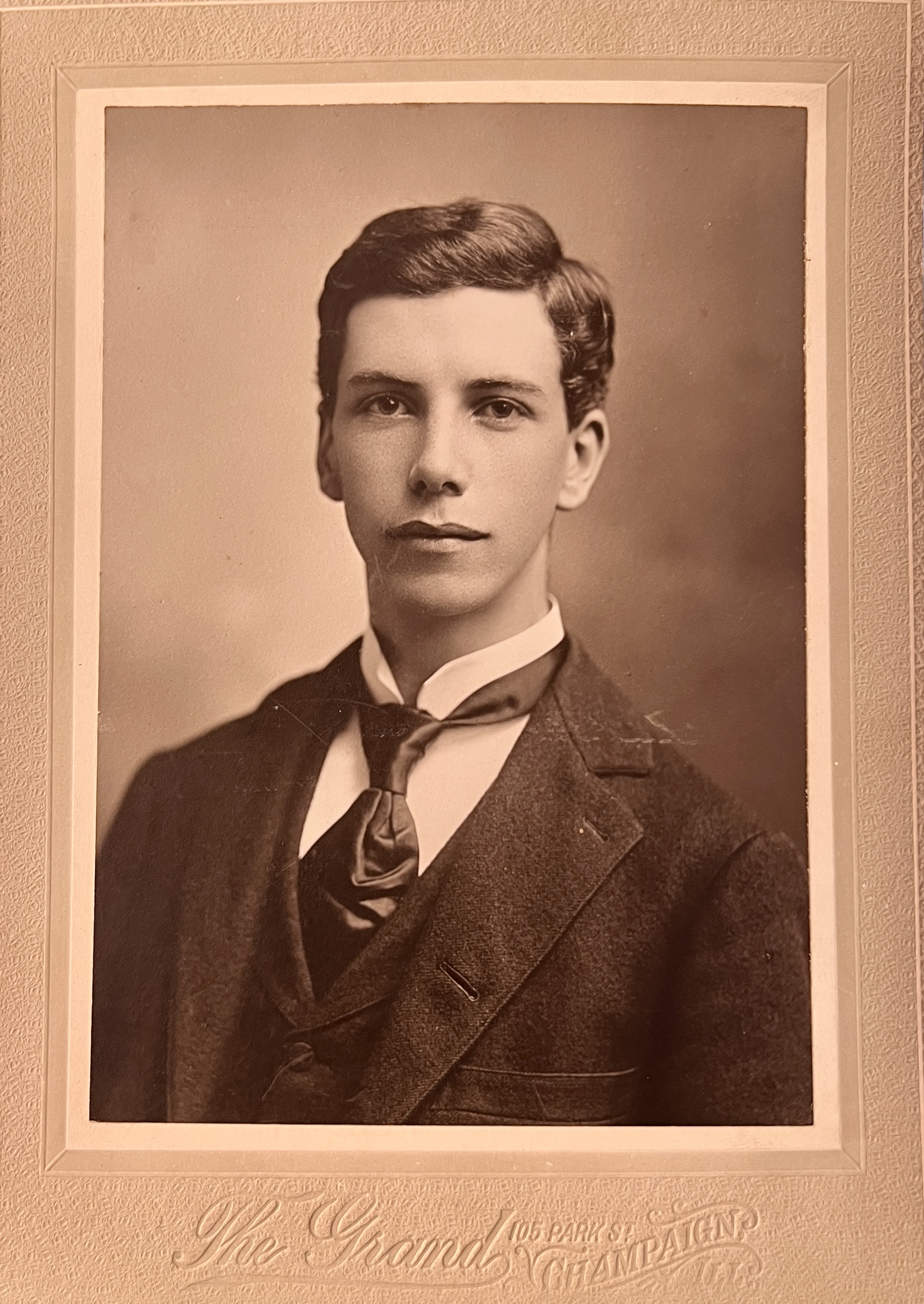
Wallace Criag, U of Illinois 1898 - 7437 Boud Ave, Chicago

Wallace Craig (1876–1954) was an American experimental psychologist and behavior scientist. He provided a conceptual framework for the study of behavior organization and is regarded as one of the founders of ethology. Craig experimentally studied the behavioral expression of emotion, the way innate and learned behavioral tendencies are integrated, and how vocal as well as social behaviors are organized. He encouraged a view of behavior as an integrated process with evolutionary, motivational, experiential, social and ecological degrees of freedom. This integrative perspective helped shape modern behavioral science.

== Early life and education ==
Wallace Craig was born on July 20, 1876, in Toronto, Ontario, Canada, the son of Alexander Craig of Edinburgh, a Scottish immigrant to the United States, and Marion Brookes of London, an Englishwoman. He married Mima Davis Jenness of Sheffield on October 12, 1904.

Craig graduated from Hyde Park High School, Chicago, Illinois, in 1895 and received both his Bachelor of Science degree (1898) and his Master of Science degree (1901) from the University of Illinois. From 1901 he studied with Charles O. Whitman and received his PhD from the University of Chicago, Illinois (1908), for his research on pigeon behavior.

Craig worked as a high school science teacher (1900, Harlan, Iowa; 1900–1901 Fort Collins, Colorado; 1904–1905 Coshocton, Ohio), as a university assistant in zoology (1901–1904, University of Chicago), and as a psychology and biology teacher (1905–1907, State Normal School, Valley City, North Dakota). In 1903 and 1906, he was a student at the Marine Biological Laboratory, Woods Hole, Massachusetts.

After receiving his doctorate, Craig became a professor of philosophy at the University of Maine at Orono (1908–22). During this period Craig published most of his papers on the principles of behavior organization. These include a series of articles comparing the expression of emotions across different species of pigeons (1909–1911), articles on time keeping and behavioral synchronization (1916, 1917), as well as conceptual papers on appetites and aversions (1917, 1918) and on fighting (1921). The circumstances surrounding the end of Craig's appointment at the University of Maine are not clear; determinants may include both a progressive loss of hearing and dissatisfaction with collegiality and with research conditions.

== Career and impact ==
After 1922, Craig's professional standing remained unstable. Thanks to support from Gordon Allport and James Woods of the Department of Philosophy and Psychology at Harvard University, Craig held various posts there until the mid-1930s (1922–1923, lecturer in psychology; 1923–1927, biophysics librarian; various other posts). He was unable to procure an established academic position or regular research program until 1937. During this period, Craig and his wife lived in Scotland for two years. In the mid-1930s the American ornithologist Margaret Morse Nice instigated a contact with Konrad Lorenz, an Austrian naturalist. Craig and Lorenz exchanged letters concerning key concepts of behavior such as reflex, instinct, taxis, tropism, learning, as well as search, appetitive and aversive behavior. None of these letters has been located to date.

Together with Craig's published work, in particular his 1918 essay on appetites and aversions, they were regarded by Lorenz as foundational for the development of ethology. A key insight was that much behavior is expressed not in response to, but in search of sensory input – or the lack of such input. With increasing appetite, animals engage in an undirected search for food, and only once located will the food stimuli be tracked down and consumption ensue. The role of learning in these processes is to provide ever more 'educated guesses' during the initial search phase.

In an essay from 1954, Lorenz refers to this view of a three-step organization of behavior as the Craig–Lorenz schema. Craig used a notably broad definition of appetite (p. 91, Craig 1918): "An appetite (…) is a state of agitation which continues so long as a certain stimulus, which may be called the appeted stimulus, is absent. When the appeted stimulus is at length received it stimulates a consummatory reaction, after which the appetitive behavior ceases and is succeeded by a state of relative rest". Likewise, he defined aversion as "a state of agitation which continues so long as a certain stimulus, referred to as the disturbing stimulus, is present; but which ceases, being replaced by a state of relative rest, when that stimulus has ceased to act on the sense-organs." One of the students of Lorenz, Monika Holzapfel, extended these notions to suggest that states of rest are goals of behavior (Holzapfel, 1940). Within his framework of appetites and aversions, Craig in his essay of 1921 described aggression as an aversion, in contrast to Lorenz, who regarded it as an appetite (Lorenz, 1966).

From 1937, Craig worked as a temporary ornithologist at the New York State Museum, State University of New York, Albany, with the support of the director of this institution, Charles C. Adams. By the end of this appointment Craig had finished a monograph on the organization and psychology of bird song (1943). This monograph features an introduction by Adams and, despite being academic in character, an unusual preface by Craig directed at young ornithologists of the future. Adams, who had known and supported Craig since Craig's student days, mentions in his introduction that Craig had been interested in birds and bird song since boyhood and had a musical bent for the violin and flute.

Funded by one-year grants from the American Philosophical Society (1944, 1945 and 1948) and by an appointment as a research fellow (1944–1947, supported by E.G. Boring and Gordon Allport), Craig returned to Harvard and worked on an essay on "The space system of the perceiving self". A 127-page manuscript of four chapters of this essay, which in a letter to Boring, Craig mentions having sent to the Society, has not been located to date.

Craig retired from Harvard in 1947. He moved to Woods Hole, Massachusetts, in 1953 and died there on April 25, 1954.

In retrospect, Craig appears one of the most insightful students of behavior of the 20th century. The reasons why his insights did not resonate more strongly with his contemporaries, with few exceptions, and why these insights did not secure him academic success continue to be discussed.

== Publications by Wallace Craig ==
- 1902. Song in birds. Science, 15, 590–592.
- 1902. Ecology. Science, 15, 793.
- 1908. The voices of pigeons regarded as a means of social control. American Journal of Sociology, 14, 86–100.
- 1909. The expressions of emotion in the pigeons: I. The blond ring dove. Journal of Comparative Neurology, 19, 29–80.
- 1911a. Oviposition induced by the male in pigeons. Journal of Morphology, 22, 299–305.
- 1911b. The expressions of emotion in the pigeons: II. The mourning dove. Auk, 28, 398–407.
- 1911 c. The expressions of emotion in the pigeons: III. The passenger pigeon. Auk, 29, 408–427.
- 1912a. Pigeons do not carry their eggs. Auk, 29, 392–393.
- 1912b. Observations on doves learning to drink. Journal of Animal Behavior, 2, 273–279.
- 1912c. Behavior of the young bird in breaking out of the egg. Journal of Animal Behavior, 2, 296–298.
- 1913a. The stimulation and the inhibition of ovulation in birds and mammals. Journal of Animal Behavior, 3, 215–221.
- 1913b. Recollections of the passenger pigeon in captivity. Bird Lore, 93–99.
- 1914. Male doves reared in isolation. Journal of Animal Behavior, 4, 121–133.
- 1916. Synchronism in the rhythmic activities of animals. Science, 44, 784–786.
- 1917. On the ability of animals to keep time with an external rhythm. Journal of Animal Behavior, 7, 444–448.
- 1917. Appetites and aversions as constituents of instincts. Proceedings of the National Academy of Sciences (USA), 3, 685–688.
- 1918. Appetites and aversions as constituents of instincts. Biological Bulletin, 34, 91–107.
- 1919. Tropisms and instinctive activities. Psychological Bulletin, 16, 151–159.
- 1920. Tropisms and instinctive activities. Psychological Bulletin, 17, 169–178.
- 1921. Why do animals fight? International Journal of Ethics, 31, 264–278.
- 1922. A note on Darwin's work on the expression of the emotions in man and animals. Journal of Abnormal and Social Psychology, 16, 256–266.
- 1924. The dog as a detective. Scientific Monthly, IS, 38–47.
- 1926. The twilight song of the wood pewee: A preliminary statement. Auk, 43, 150–152.
- 1926. Request for the data on the twilight song of the wood pewee. Science, 63, 525.
- 1933. The music of the wood pewee's song and one of its laws. Auk, SO, 174–178.
- 1943. The song of the wood pewee Myiochanes virens Linnaeus: A study of bird music. New York State Museum Bulletin No. 334. Albany: University of the State of New York.
- 1944. The twilight ceremonies of horseflies and birds. Science, 99, 125–126.
