= Václav Gvoždík =

Czech herpetologist

RNDr. Václav Gvoždík Ph.D.
- Born: 24 August 1979 (age 47)
- Education: Charles University
- Known for: Evolutionary and phylogenetic research on vertebrates
- Scientific career
- Fields: Herpetology
- Workplaces: National Museum (Prague); Institute of Vertebrate Biology, Czech Academy of Sciences

Václav Gvoždík (born 24 August 1979) is a Czech herpetologist specializing in evolutionary biology and vertebrate phylogenetics.

== Education and career ==
Between 2003 and 2010, Gvoždík studied at the Faculty of Science, Charles University in Prague. He later completed a postdoctoral fellowship at the University of Basel during 2012–2013.

Since 2006, Gvoždík has worked in the zoological department of the National Museum in Prague and since 2014 he has also been affiliated with the Institute of Vertebrate Biology of the Czech Academy of Sciences. His research focuses on evolution, speciation processes, and phylogenetic diversification of vertebrates, using molecular approaches, phenotypic analyses, and biogeographical methods.

== Discoveries ==
Working with collaborators, Gvoždík has co-described several new amphibian taxa, including two critically endangered frog species from Cameroon, Phrynobatrachus mbabo and Phrynobatrachus arcanus, described in 2020.

In 2021, he was also part of a research team that described the new frog genus Congolius, belonging to the family Hyperoliidae.
