= Ethology =

Study of animal behaviour

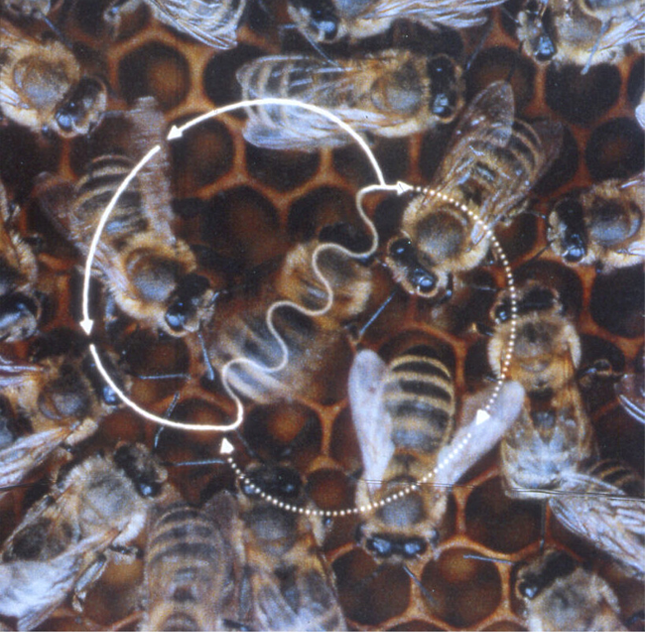
Honeybee workers perform the waggle dance to indicate the range and direction of food.

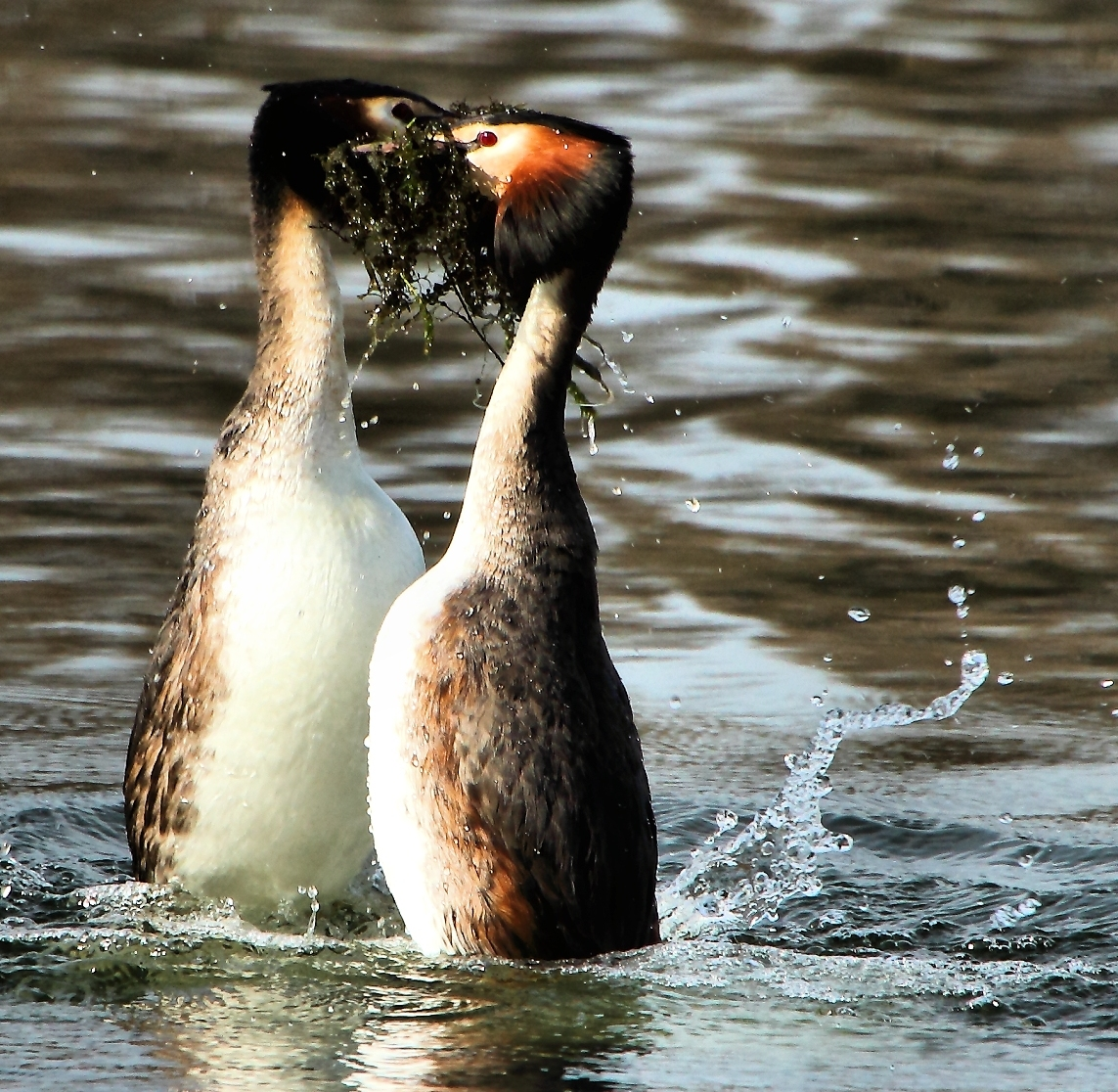
Great crested grebes perform a complex synchronised courtship display.

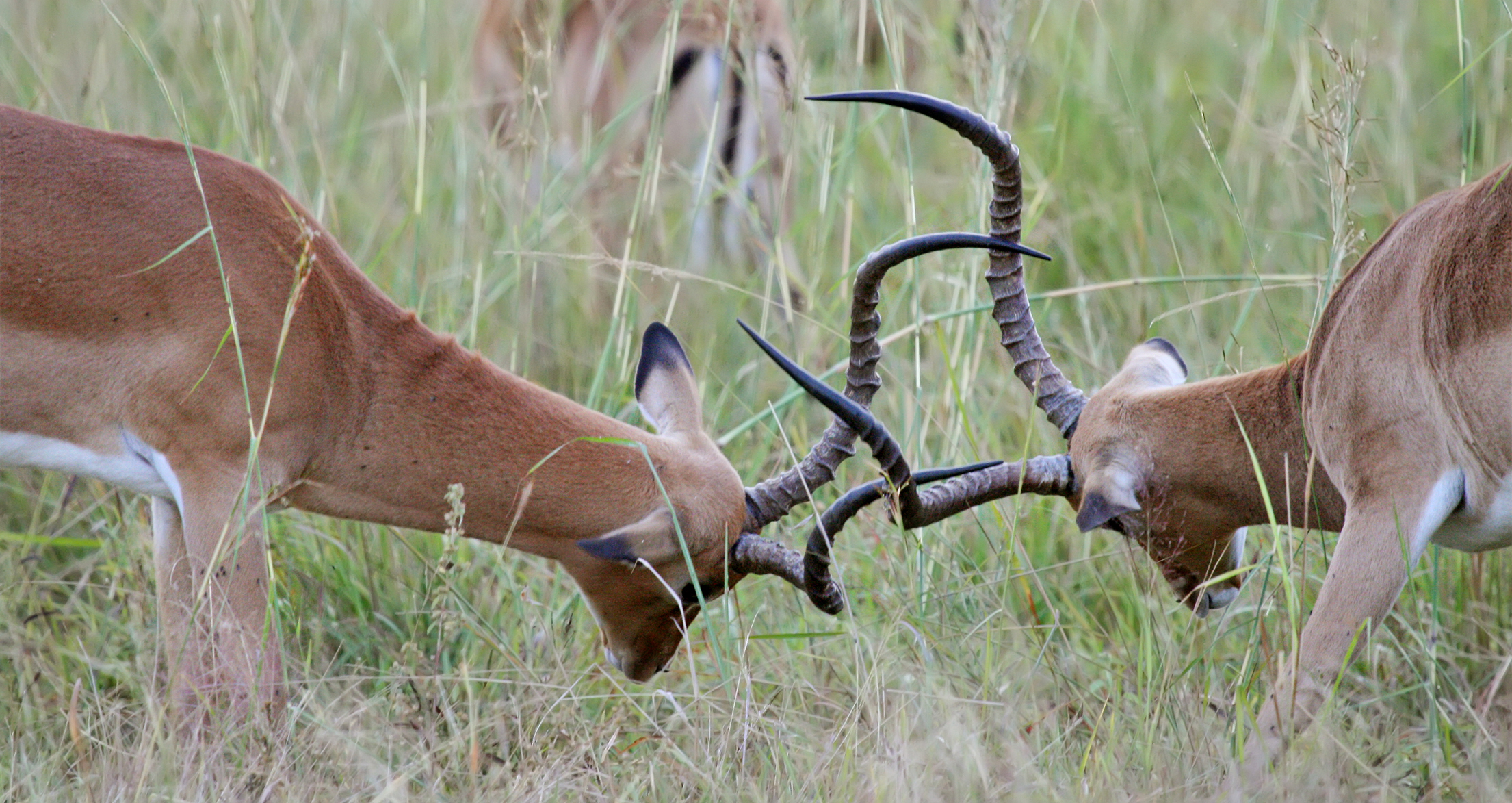
Male impalas fighting during the rut

Ethology is a branch of zoology that studies the behaviour of non-human animals. It has its scientific roots in the work of Charles Darwin and of American and German ornithologists of the late 19th and early 20th century, including Charles O. Whitman, Oskar Heinroth, and Wallace Craig. The modern discipline of ethology is generally considered to have begun during the 1930s with the work of the Dutch biologist Nikolaas Tinbergen and the Austrian biologists Konrad Lorenz and Karl von Frisch, the three winners of the 1973 Nobel Prize in Physiology or Medicine. Ethology combines laboratory and field science, with a strong relation to neuroanatomy, ecology, and evolutionary biology.

== Etymology ==
The modern term ethology derives from the Greek language: ἦθος, ethos meaning "character" and -λογία, -logia meaning "the study of". The term was first popularized by the American entomologist William Morton Wheeler in 1902.

== History ==
=== The beginnings of ethology ===
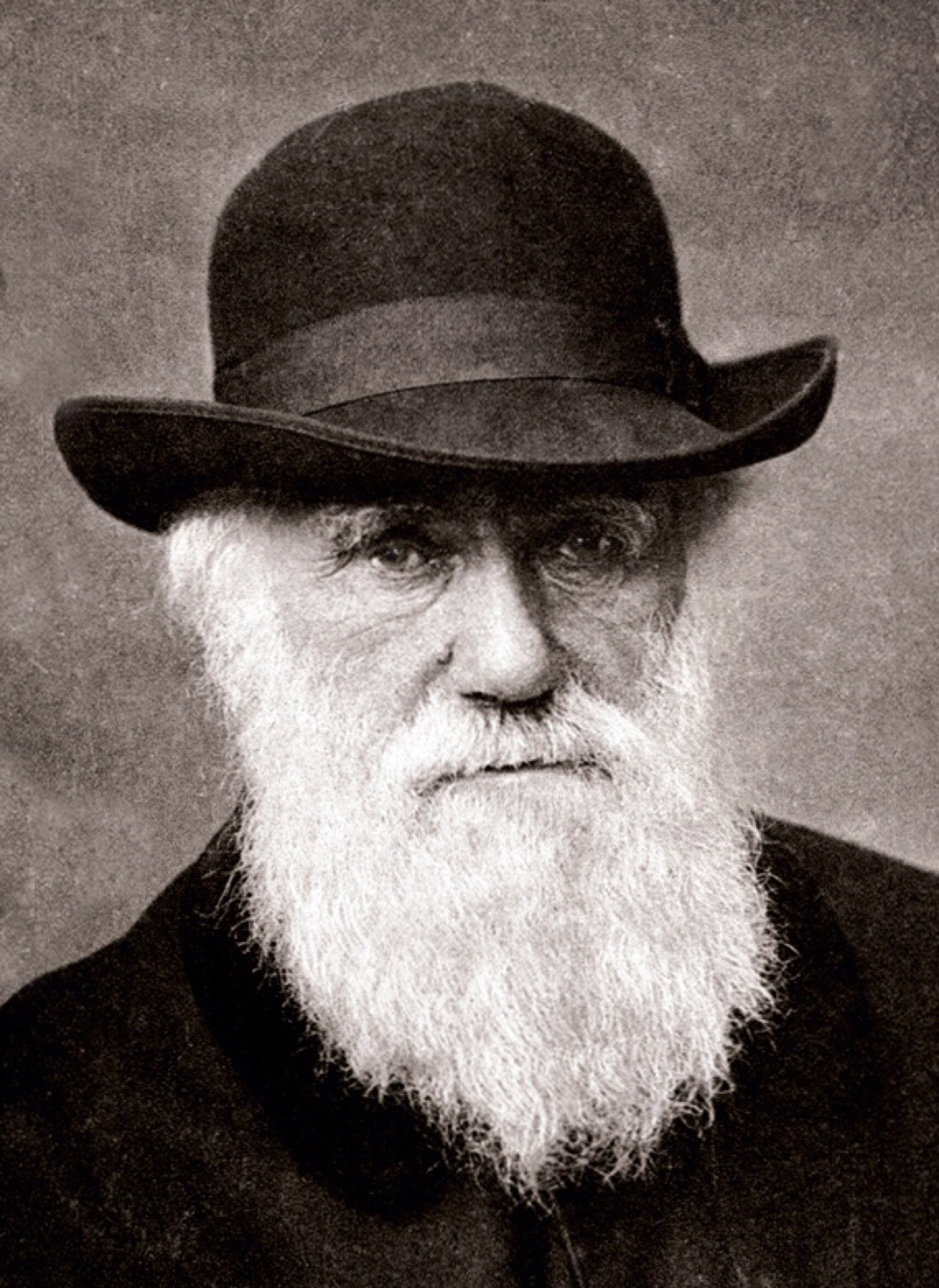
Charles Darwin (1809–1882) explored the expression of emotions in animals.

Ethologists have been concerned particularly with the evolution of behaviour and its understanding in terms of natural selection. In one sense, the first modern ethologist was Charles Darwin, whose 1872 book The Expression of the Emotions in Man and Animals influenced many ethologists. He pursued his interest in behaviour by encouraging his protégé George Romanes, who investigated animal learning and intelligence using an anthropomorphic method, anecdotal cognitivism, that did not gain scientific support.

Other early ethologists, such as Eugène Marais, Charles O. Whitman, Oskar Heinroth, Wallace Craig and Julian Huxley, instead concentrated on behaviours that can be called instinctive in that they occur in all members of a species under specified circumstances. Their starting point for studying the behaviour of a new species was to construct an ethogram, a description of the main types of behaviour with their frequencies of occurrence. This provided an objective, cumulative database of behaviour.

=== Growth of the field ===
Because of the work of Konrad Lorenz and Niko Tinbergen, ethology developed strongly in continental Europe in the years prior to World War II. After the war, Tinbergen moved to the University of Oxford, and ethology grew stronger in the UK, helped by the work of William Thorpe, Robert Hinde, and Patrick Bateson at the University of Cambridge.

Lorenz, Tinbergen, and von Frisch were jointly awarded the Nobel Prize in Physiology or Medicine in 1973 for their work of developing ethology.

Ethology is now a well-recognized scientific discipline, with its own journals such as Animal Behaviour, Applied Animal Behaviour Science, Animal Cognition, Behaviour, Behavioral Ecology and Ethology. In 1972, the International Society for Human Ethology was founded along with its journal, Human Ethology.

=== Social ethology ===
In 1972, the English ethologist John H. Crook distinguished comparative ethology from social ethology, and argued that much of the ethology that had existed so far was really comparative ethology—examining animals as individuals—whereas, in the future, ethologists would need to concentrate on the behaviour of social groups of animals and the social structure within them.

E. O. Wilson's book Sociobiology: The New Synthesis appeared in 1975, and since that time, the study of behaviour has been much more concerned with social aspects. It has been driven by the Darwinism associated with Wilson, Robert Trivers, and W. D. Hamilton. The related development of behavioural ecology has helped transform ethology. Furthermore, a substantial rapprochement with comparative psychology has occurred, so the modern scientific study of behaviour offers a spectrum of approaches. In 2020, Tobias Starzak and Albert Newen from the Institute of Philosophy II at the Ruhr University Bochum postulated that animals may have beliefs.

== Tinbergen's four questions for ethologists ==
Tinbergen argued that ethology needed to include four kinds of explanation in any instance of behaviour:

- Function – How does the behaviour affect the animal's chances of survival and reproduction? Why does the animal respond that way instead of some other way?
- Causation – What are the stimuli that elicit the response, and how has it been modified by recent learning?
- Development – How does the behaviour change with age, and what early experiences are necessary for the animal to display the behaviour?
- Evolutionary history – How does the behaviour compare with similar behaviour in related species, and how might it have begun through the process of phylogeny?

These explanations are complementary rather than mutually exclusive—all instances of behaviour require an explanation at each of these four levels. For example, the function of eating is to acquire nutrients (which ultimately aids survival and reproduction), but the immediate cause of eating is hunger (causation). Hunger and eating are evolutionarily ancient and are found in many species (evolutionary history), and develop early within an organism's lifespan (development). It is easy to confuse such questions—for example, to argue that people eat because they are hungry and not to acquire nutrients—without realizing that the reason people experience hunger is because it causes them to acquire nutrients, i.e. hunger too has a function.

== See also ==
- Animal behavior consultant
- Anthrozoology
- Behavioral ecology
- Cognitive ethology
- Deception in animals
- Human ethology
- List of abnormal behaviours in animals
- Tool use by non-human animals
