= Daniel G. Freedman =

American psychologist

Daniel G. Freedman (born 16 January 1927, died 10 June 2008) was an American psychologist and Professor in Comparative Human Development at the University of Chicago, who pioneered the use of biological and evolutionary viewpoints to understand differences of human behavior. His studies of behavioral differences in dogs and human infants were ground-breaking.

== Career ==
Freedman received his BA in psychology in 1949 from the University of California, Berkeley, his MA in 1953 from the University of Colorado, and his PhD in 1957 from Brandeis University.

As a research fellow in the Division of Behavioral Studies at Jackson Memorial Laboratories from 1955 to 1957, he studied differences in behavior between four breeds of dogs. This formed the basis for his doctoral dissertation.

From 1957 to 1959 he made a longitudinal study of infant twins at the Langley Porter Neuropsychiatry Institute. He was one of the first human ethologists, filming infants on 16mm film. The resulting film, "Cross-cultural differences in newborn behavior: comparisons of Caucasian, Navajo, Japanese, African and Australian Aboriginal newborns, using the Brazelton-Freedman Newborn Examination", demonstrated differences in temperament between infants of different ethnic backgrounds immediately after birth.

From 1963 to 1964 he studied at the Institute for Medical Genetics, Uppsala, Sweden, on an NIMH Special Fellowship. From 1964 to 1968 he was a member of the Biology faculty at the University of Chicago. From 1971 to 1972 he co-led (with Gregory Bateson) an observational study of different cultures at the International School of America. From 1977 until his death he was Professor of Human Development at the University of Chicago. He retired in 1995, becoming professor emeritus of psychology.

== Personal life ==
Freedman was married twice, first to Nina Chinn, and then to Jane Gorman. He had two sons.

== Books ==
- Human Infancy: An Evolutionary Perspective (1974)
- Human Sociobiology: A Holistic Approach (1980)
- Dominance Relations (1980, with D.B. Omark and F.F. Strayer)
