= Earl O'Roke =

American zoologist (1887–1958)

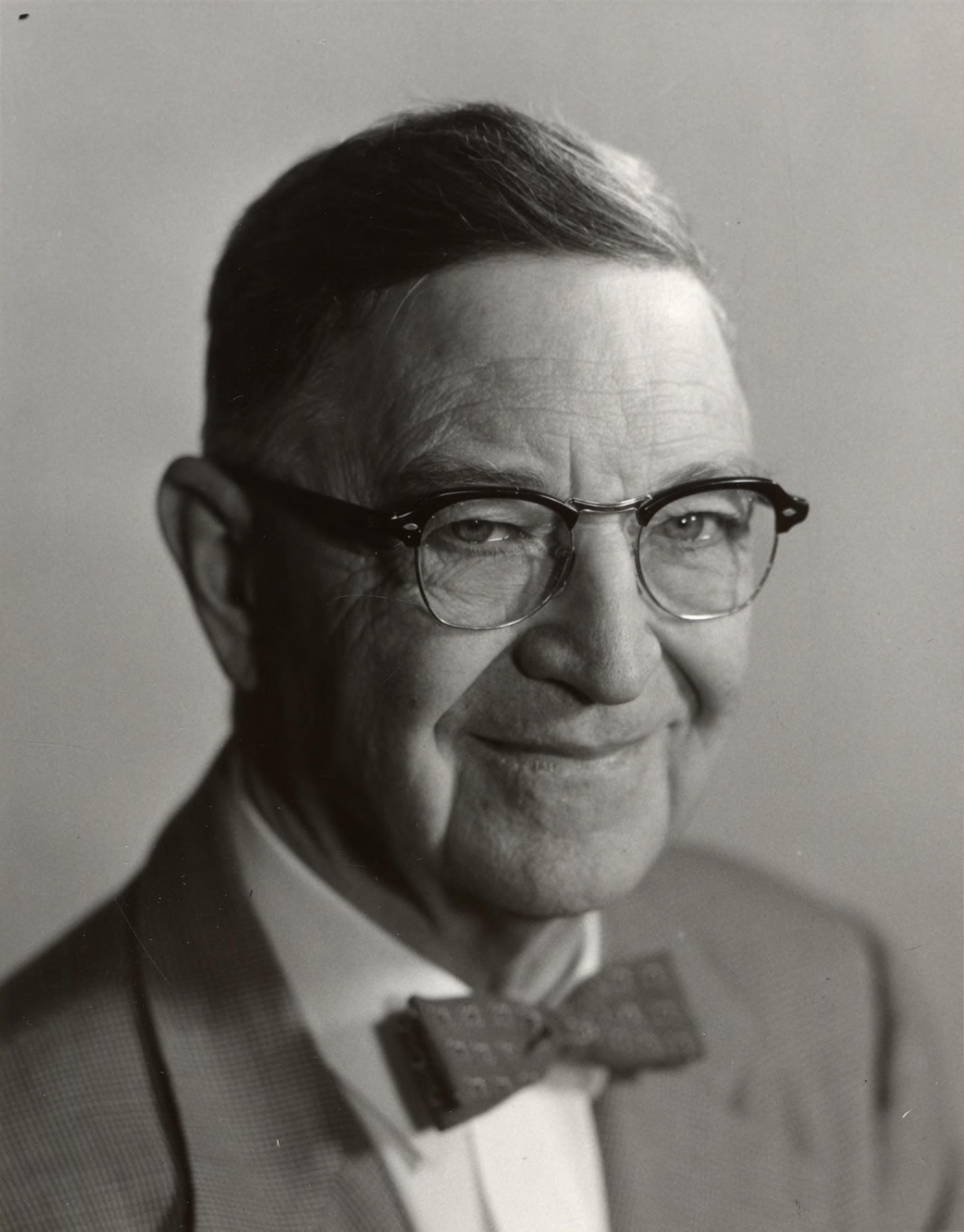
Earl C. O'Roke

Earl Cleveland O'Roke (1887–1958) was an American academic who served as professor of forest zoology at the University of Michigan for much of his professional life.

== Early life and education ==
O'Roke was born in 1887 in Sabetha, Kansas, where he lived on a farm and attended first a rural school, then Sabetha High School. He attended the University of Kansas, from which he earned a B.A. in 1912 and a M.A. in 1916 with a thesis titled "Larval trematodes from Kansas fresh-water snails" under the supervision of Bennet M. Allen. He received a Ph.D. from the University of California in 1929 with a thesis titled "The morphology transmission, and life history of Haemoproteus lophortyx, a blood parasite of the California valley quail".

== Scientific career ==
Following his Ph.D. in 1917, O'Roke joined the zoology faculty at the University of Wyoming, serving as assistant professor of zoology and assistant parasitologist at the University Experiment Station. He moved in 1920, joining the faculty of South Dakota State College of Agriculture and Mechanic Arts again as assistant professor of zoology. In 1927, he left academia to serve as a parasitologist for the California Division of the U.S. Department of Fish and Game. In 1929 he returned to academia as assistant professor of forest zoology at the University of Michigan, where he would stay for the majority of his professional career. He was promoted to associate professor in 1937, and subsequently to professor of forest zoology.

O'Roke's research interests were broad. His best-known work was his discovery that the parasite of birds Leucocytozoon was transmitted by black flies. He also is known for his attempts to track deer lungworm through the use of radioactive isotopes.

O'Roke was an active member of various professional scientific societies including the American Association for the Advancement of Science, and the American Society of Parasitologists.

== Personal life ==
O'Roke was married to Cora Ann Morris O'Roke, with whom he had one daughter.
