= Bennet M. Allen =

American zoologist (1877–1963)

Bennet Allen
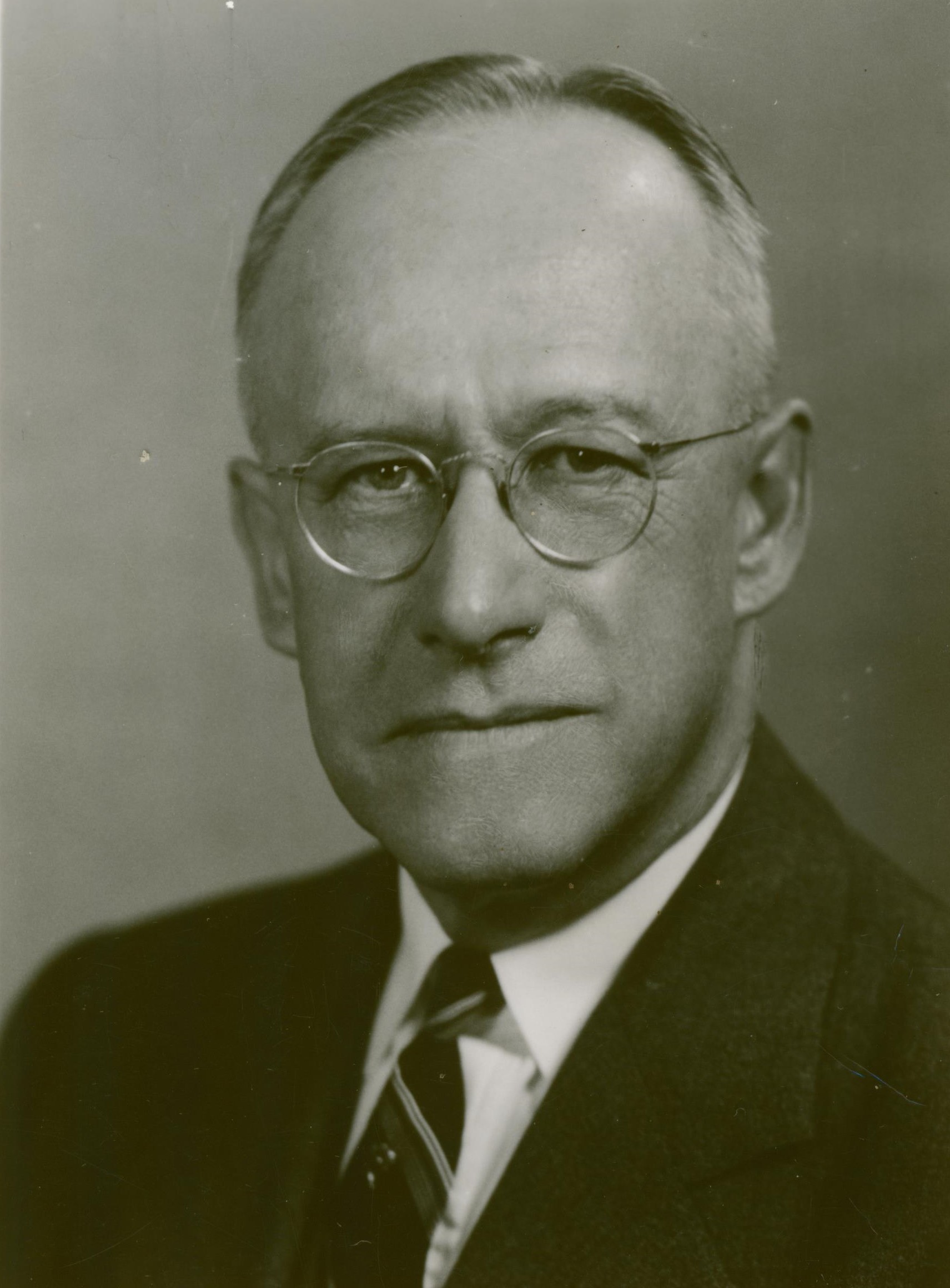
- Born: July 4, 1877; Greencastle, Indiana, United States
- Died: 1963 (aged 85–86)

Academic background
- Education: DePauw University, University of Chicago
- Thesis: The development of the ovary and the testis in the mammals (1903)
- Doctoral advisor: Charles Otis Whitman

Academic work
- Discipline: Zoologist
- Sub-discipline: Embryologist
- Institutions: University of Kansas, University of California, Los Angeles
- Doctoral students: Earl O'Roke

Bennet Mills Allen (July 4, 1877 – 1963) was an American zoologist, who was Professor of Zoology at the University of Kansas and later at the University of California at Los Angeles. His research focused on the role of the endocrine system in development using amphibians as a model system.

== Early life and education ==
Allen was born in Greencastle, Indiana on July 4, 1877. He received a bachelor's degree from DePauw University, followed by a doctorate from the University of Chicago in 1903 with a dissertation titled "The development of the ovary and the testis in the mammals" working under Charles Otis Whitman.

== Academic career ==
After receiving his doctorate, Allen moved to the University of Wisconsin as a teacher, first in the Department of Anatomy, then in the Department of Zoology. In 1913, he moved to the University of Kansas becoming Professor of Zoology and head of the department. In 1922, he moved to the University of California at Los Angeles (UCLA), serving as the first chair of the Department of Zoology. In 1947, Allen retired from the Department of Zoology, but remained at the university for 11 years as a member of the Atomic Energy Project at UCLA. He retired from that project in 1958, but remained at UCLA associated with the Department of Radiology in the School of Medicine until his death in 1963.

Throughout his career, Bennet's research focused on the role of endocrine glands in development. He mostly completed this work using larval amphibians as a research model. He showed that the thyroid is required for the development of tadpoles into frogs, and characterized the role of various other endocrine glands in tadpole development. Later in his career, upon moving to the Atomic Energy Project, Bennet's shifted his research to the effects of radiation exposure on various tissues.

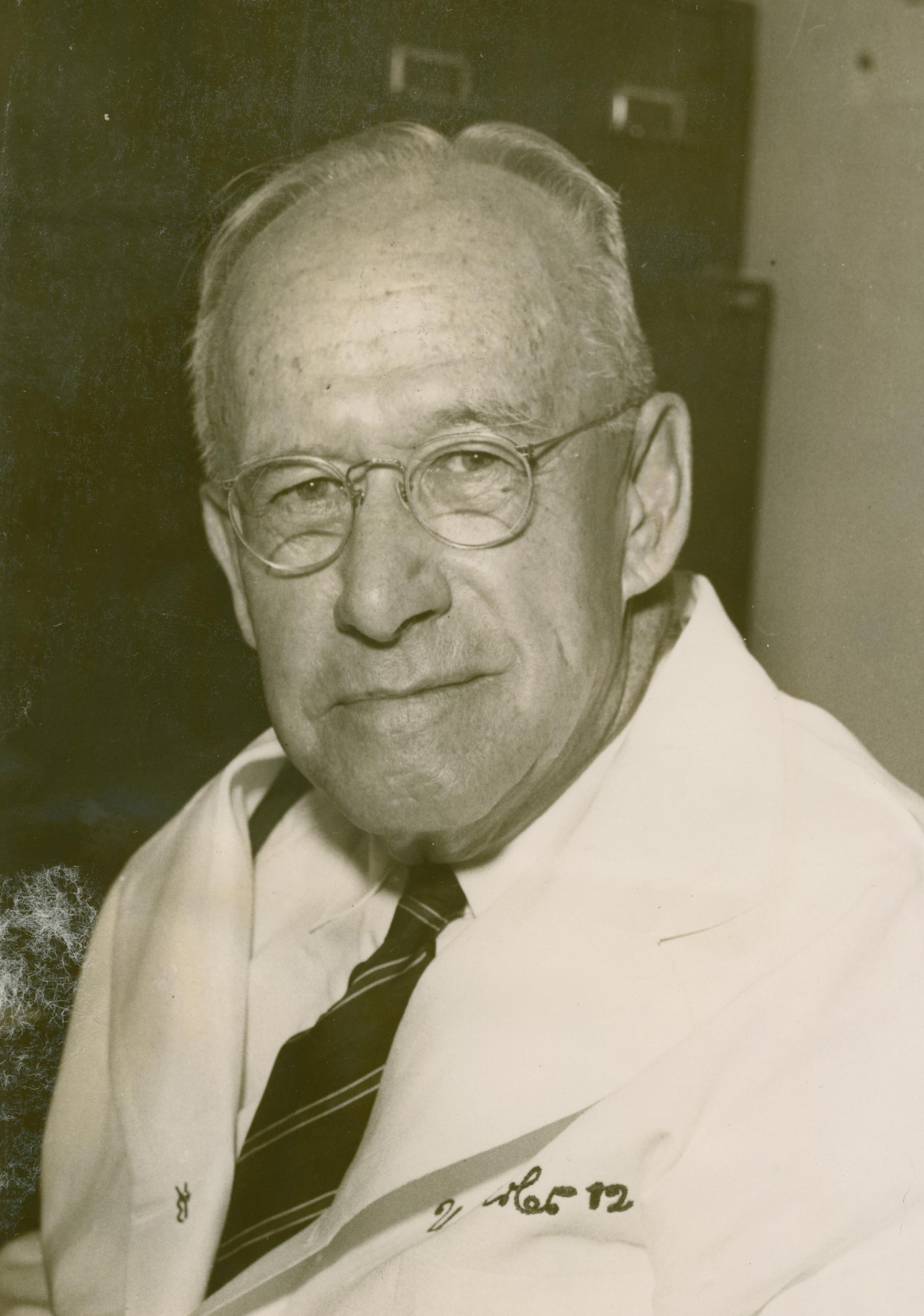

== Awards and honors ==
Allen received an honorary Doctor of Science degree from DePauw University, and an honorary Doctor of Laws degree from the University of California.
