= Jaroslav Flegr =

Czech parasitologist and evolutionary biologist

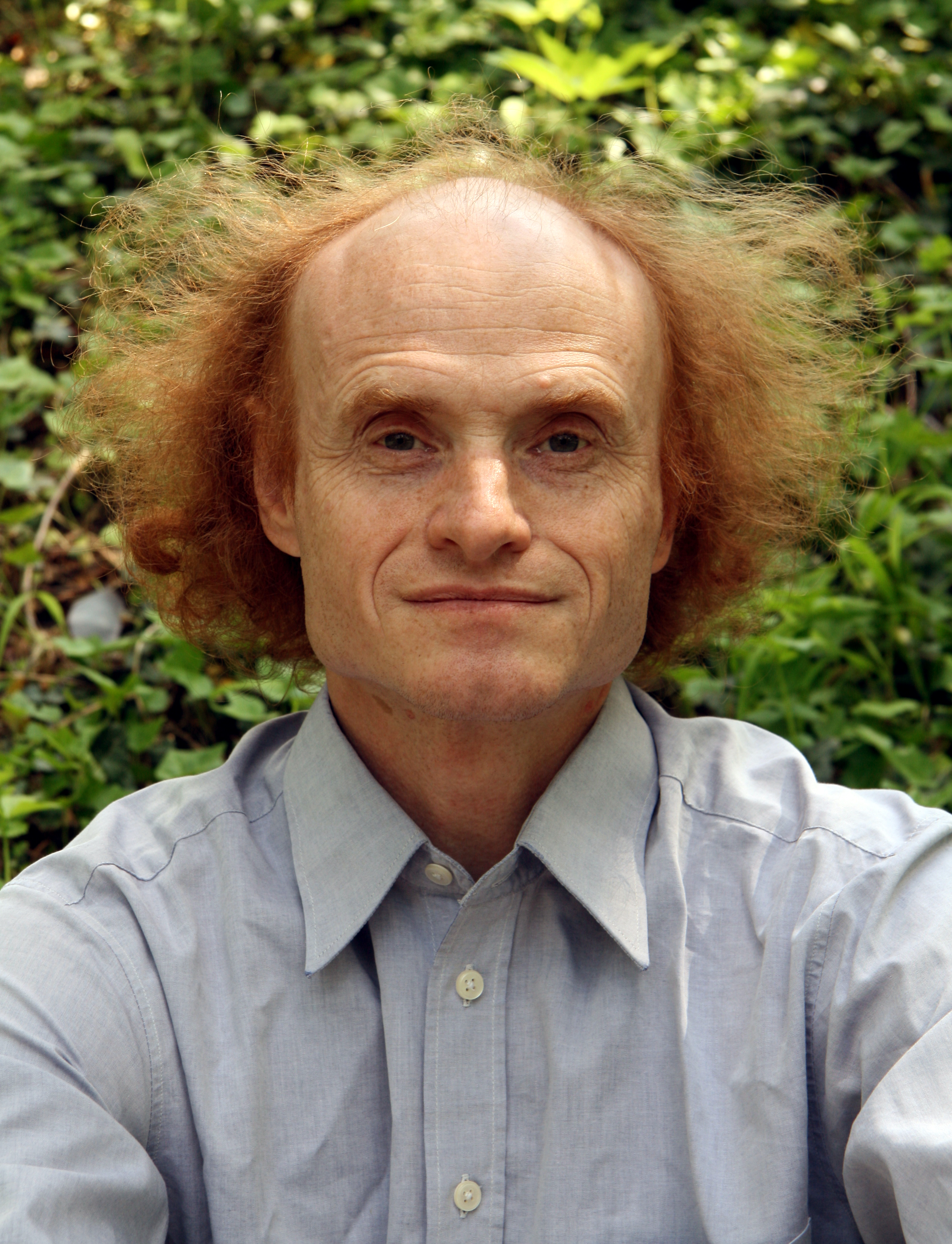
- Born: 12 March 1958 (age 68); Prague, Czechoslovakia (now Czech Republic)
- Known for: research into toxoplasmosis
- Awards: Ig Nobel Prize in Public Health (2014)
- Scientific career
- Fields: Parasitology
- Workplaces: Charles University in Prague

Jaroslav Flegr (born 12 March 1958) is a Czech parasitologist, evolutionary biologist, and author of the book Frozen Evolution. He is professor of biology at the Faculty of Science, Charles University in Prague, and is a member of the editorial board of the journal Neuroendocrinology Letters.

His work on how toxoplasmosis—an infection caused by the protozoan parasite T. gondii—influences personality, sex ratios, and rates of traffic accidents, has received coverage in The Atlantic, Salon, and The Guardian. Flegr maintains that toxoplasmosis might increase the rate of traffic accidents by as much as one million collisions per year. He also believes that T. gondii contributes to suicides and mental disorders such as schizophrenia.

== Frozen Evolution ==
Frozen Evolution is a popular science book which aims to explain current developments in evolutionary biology to a wide audience. It also contains information boxes which clarify important topics in science like peer review, scientific journals, citation metrics, philosophy of science, paradigm shifts, and Occam's razor. Flegr's previous research in toxoplasmosis is also mentioned.

The book also discusses Flegr's model of frozen plasticity, a hypothesis that describes a possible mechanism for the origin of adaptive traits. This hypothesis proposes that natural selection can only explain adaptation in limited conditions, for example when populations are genetically homogeneous. He describes frozen plasticity as being more general, and maintains that it better explains the origin of adaptive traits in genetically heterogeneous populations of sexual reproducing organisms. His hypothesis of frozen plasticity is an extension of Niles Eldredge and Stephen Jay Gould's theory of punctuated equilibria, which describes the history of most fossil species as being relatively stable for millions of years, later punctuated by swift periods of evolutionary change during speciation.

== Bibliography ==
- Jaroslav Flegr (2008). Frozen Evolution: Or, that's not the way it is, Mr. Darwin—Farewell to selfish gene (PDF). Prague: Charles University, Faculty of Science. ISBN 978-80-86561-73-8. (Czech version only in print)
- Jaroslav Flegr (2009). Mechanisms of Evolution. Prague: Academia. (Czech version only in print)
- Jaroslav Flegr; Jan Havlíček (1999). Changes in personality profile of young women with latent toxoplasmosis (PDF). Archived from the original (PDF) on 21 October 2014. Folia Parasitologica 46 (May): 22–28.
