= Animal Cognition =

- Language: English
- Edited by: Debbie M. Kelly

Publication details
- History: 1998-present
- Publisher: Springer Science+Business Media
- Impact factor: 3.084 (2020)

Standard abbreviations
- ISO 4: Anim. Cogn.

Indexing
- ISSN: 1435-9448 (print); 1435-9456 (web)
- OCLC no.: 42757004

Links
- Journal homepage

Animal Cognition is a peer-reviewed scientific journal published by Springer Science+Business Media. It covers research in ethology, behavioral ecology, animal behavior, cognitive sciences, and all aspects of human and animal cognition. According to the Journal Citation Reports, the journal has a 2020 impact factor of 3.084.
