= Instinct =

Behaviour due to innate biological factors

Instinct is the inherent inclination of a living organism towards a particular complex behaviour, containing innate (inborn) elements. The simplest example of an instinctive behaviour is a fixed action pattern (FAP), in which a very short to medium length sequence of actions, without variation, are carried out in response to a corresponding clearly defined stimulus. Every animal has instincts, including humans.

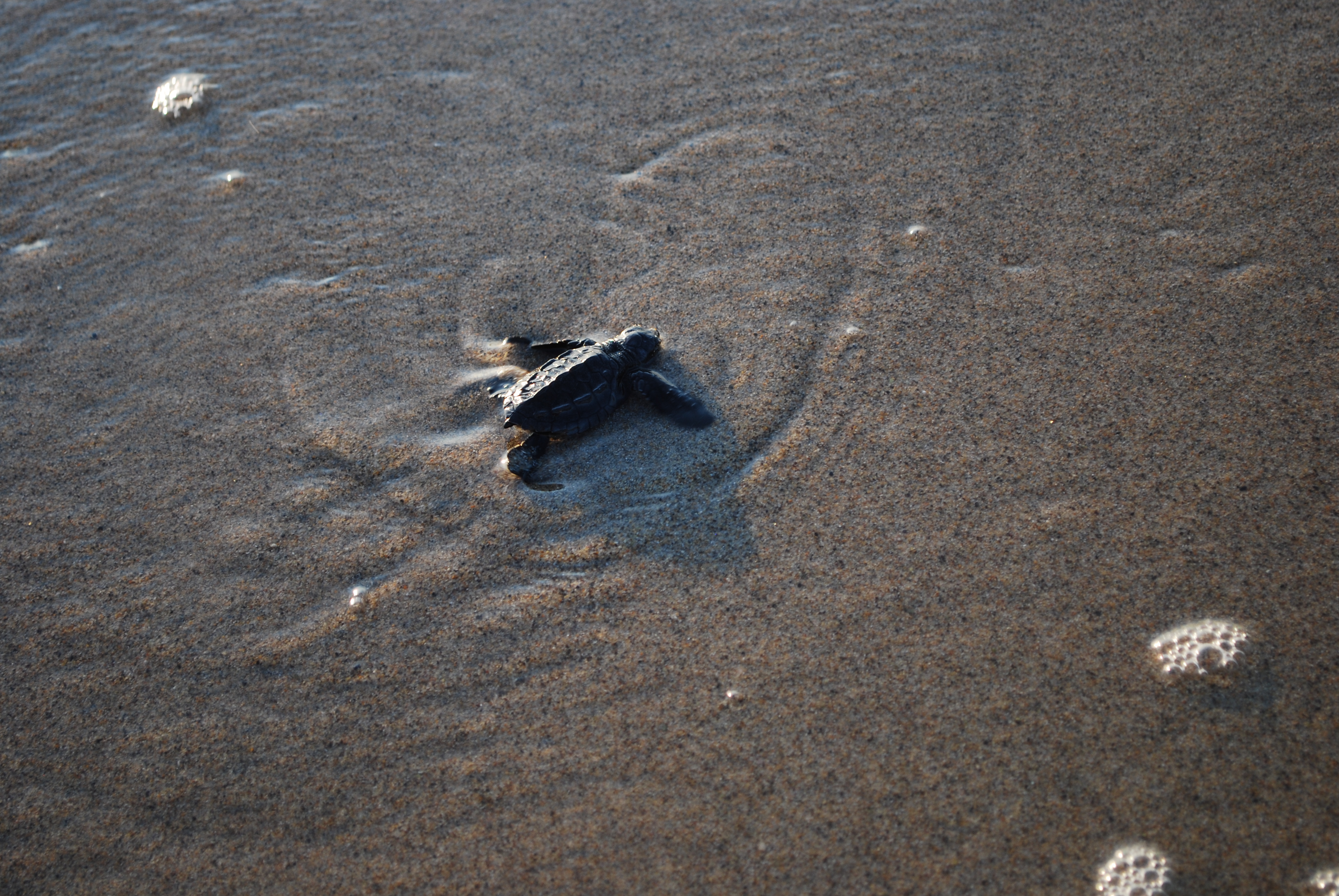
A loggerhead sea turtle hatchling makes its way to the open ocean.

Any behaviour is instinctive if it is performed without being based upon prior experience (that is, in the absence of learning), and is therefore an expression of innate biological factors. Sea turtles, newly hatched on a beach, will instinctively move toward the ocean. A marsupial climbs into its mother's pouch upon being born. Other examples include animal fighting, animal courtship behaviour, internal escape functions, and the building of nests. Though an instinct is defined by its invariant innate characteristics, details of its performance can be changed by experience; for example, a dog can improve its listening skills by practice.

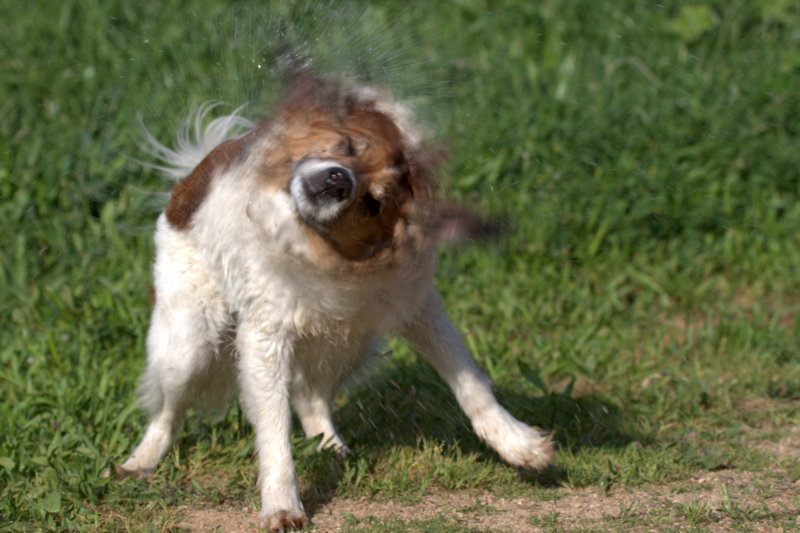
A wet dog instinctively shakes the water from its fur.

Instincts are inborn complex patterns of behaviour that exist in most members of the species, and should be distinguished from reflexes, which are simple responses of an organism to a specific stimulus, such as the contraction of the pupil in response to bright light or the spasmodic movement of the lower leg when the knee is tapped. The absence of volitional capacity must not be confused with an inability to modify fixed action patterns. For example, people may be able to modify a stimulated fixed action pattern by consciously recognizing the point of its activation and simply stop doing it, whereas animals without a sufficiently strong volitional capacity may not be able to disengage from their fixed action patterns, once activated.

== Early theorists ==
=== Initial studies ===
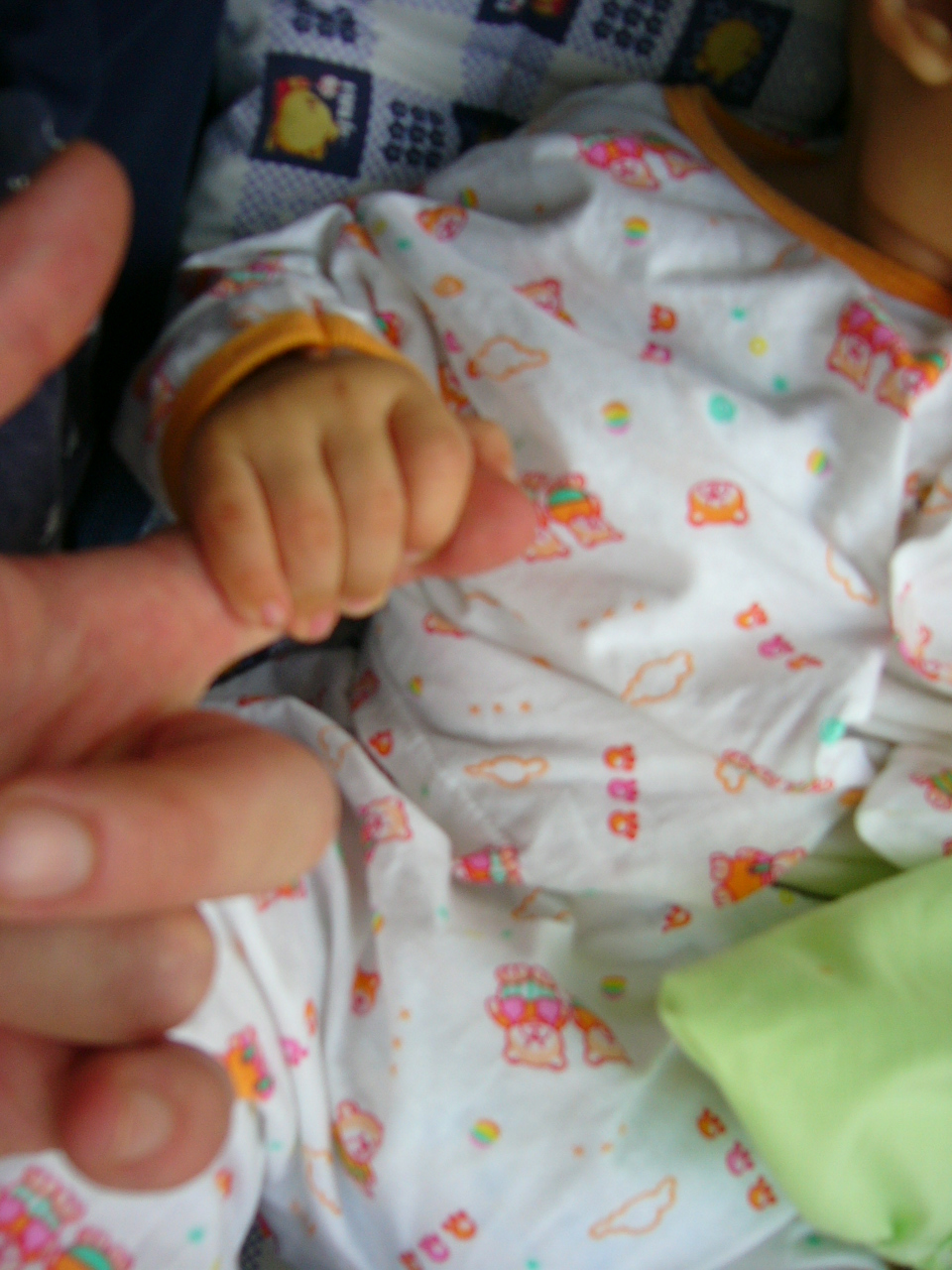
Primitive reflexes

Jean Henri Fabre (1823–1915) is said to be the first person to study small animals (other than birds) and insects, and he specifically specialized in the instincts of insects. Fabre considered an instinct to be a linked set of behaviours that an organism undergoes unconsciously in response to external conditions. Fabre concluded a significant difference between humans and other animals is that most animals cannot reason. He came to this conclusion after observing how insects and wild birds continued to repeat a certain behaviour in response to a novel situation. While these instinctive behaviours appeared complex, the insects and animals did not adjust their behaviour despite it not helping them in that novel situation. Fabre observed and labelled multiple behaviours "instinctive", for they do not involve reasoning, including maternal instincts; Metamorphosis; Mimicry; Molting; Playing dead; Taxis. Fabre believed instincts were "fixed patterns", meaning these linked sets of behaviours do not change in response to novel environmental situations. One specific example that helped him arrive at this conclusion is his study of various wasp species. All of the wasp species he studied performed a certain pattern of behaviour when catching their prey, which Fabre called a fixed pattern. Then Fabre intervened in the wasps' process of catching prey, and only one of the species adjusted their behaviour in response to this unfamiliar interception. Fabre explained this contradiction by arguing that any individuals which stray from the norms of their species are merely an exception, while also admitting that there could be some room for growth within a species' instincts. Fabre's belief that instincts are fixed opposes the theory of evolution. He rejected that one species could evolve into another, and also rejected that human consciousness could be achieved through the evolution of unconscious traits.

Wilhelm Wundt (1832–1920) founded the first psychology laboratory in 1879 at the University of Leipzig. He was able to draw conclusions about instinct from his careful observations of both animal and human behaviour. He believed unconscious processes (which he called "instinctive movements") were the result of sensations and emotions, and these unconscious processes were building blocks towards consciousness. Wundt studied the facial expressions babies made in response to the sensations of sweet, sour, and bitter tastes. He concluded these facial expressions were the result of the babies trying to avoid unpleasant emotions because there was something unpleasant in their mouths, and that these instincts (which he uses interchangeably with reflexive movements) only became innate because past generations learned it and it benefited their survival. The process by which Wundt explained the existence of instincts is natural selection. More specifically, his research suggests natural selection causes small changes in the nervous system over time. These changes bring about hereditary drives in organisms, which are then responsible for any unconscious processes. Another thing to note is that Wundt used the terms unconscious processes, reflexive movements, and instinctive movements interchangeably, often grouping them together.

Sigmund Freud considered that mental images of bodily needs, expressed in the form of mental desires, are called instincts. Freud defined instincts as "biological forces that motivate individuals to satisfy their needs." He divided them into life instincts (Eros), which are focused on survival, reproduction, and pleasure, and death instincts (Thanatos), which are associated with aggression and self-destruction. Freud emphasized the importance of these instincts in shaping human behavior and personality development.

In the early 20th century, there was recognized a "union of instinct and emotion". William McDougall held that many instincts have their respective associated specific emotions. As research became more rigorous and terms better defined, instinct as an explanation for human behaviour became less common. In 1932, McDougall argued that the word instinct is more suitable for describing animal behaviour, while he recommended the word propensity for goal-directed combinations of the many innate human abilities, which are loosely and variably linked, in a way that shows strong plasticity. McDougall defines instincts as "innate, inherited tendencies that guide behavior in a particular direction." He views instincts as the fundamental forces that influence human motivation and behavior. According to McDougall, instincts are biologically ingrained and provide the primary source of motivation for various human actions.

John B. Watson (1924) approached instincts from a behaviorist perspective, claiming that "instincts are complex, pre-programmed behaviors that can be conditioned into learned responses." While Watson acknowledges the existence of some innate behaviors, he argued that the majority of human behavior is learned through interaction with the environment, rather than being primarily driven by instinct.

In the 1950s, the psychologist Abraham Maslow argued that humans no longer have instincts because we have the ability to override them in certain situations. He felt that what is called instinct is often imprecisely defined, and really amounts to strong "drives". For Maslow, an instinct is something which cannot be overridden, and therefore while the term may have applied to humans in the past, it no longer does.

=== Innate behaviour revisited ===
An interest in innate behaviours reappeared in the 1950s with Konrad Lorenz and Nikolaas Tinbergen, who made the distinction between instinct and learned behaviours. Our modern understanding of instinctual behaviour in animals owes much to their work. For instance, there exists a sensitive period for a bird in which it learns the identity of its mother. Konrad Lorenz famously had a goose imprint on his boots. Thereafter the goose would follow whoever wore the boots. This suggests that the identity of the goose's mother was learned, but the goose's behaviour towards what it perceived as its mother was instinctive.

In a conference in 1960, chaired by the comparative psychologist Frank Beach, the term instinct was restricted in its application. During the 1960s and 1970s, textbooks still contained some discussion of instincts in reference to human behaviour. By the year 2000, a survey of the 12 best selling textbooks in introductory psychology revealed only one reference to instincts, and that was in regard to Sigmund Freud's referral to the "id" instincts. In this sense, the term instinct appeared to have become outmoded for introductory textbooks on human psychology. The book Instinct: An Enduring Problem in Psychology (1961) selected a range of writings about the topic.

In a classic paper published in 1972, the psychologist Richard Herrnstein wrote: "A comparison of McDougall's theory of instinct and Skinner's reinforcement theory—representing nature and nurture—shows remarkable, and largely unrecognized, similarities between the contending sides in the nature–nurture debate as applied to the analysis of behavior."

F. B. Mandal proposed a set of criteria by which a behaviour might be considered instinctual: (a) be automatic, (b) be irresistible, (c) occur at some point in development, (d) be triggered by some event in the environment, (e) occur in every member of the species, (f) be unmodifiable, and (g) govern behaviour for which the organism needs no training (although the organism may profit from experience and to that degree the behaviour is modifiable).

In Information Behavior: An Evolutionary Instinct (2010, pp. 35–42), Amanda Spink notes that "currently in the behavioral sciences instinct is generally understood as the innate part of behavior that emerges without any training or education in humans." She claims that the viewpoint that information behaviour has an instinctive basis is grounded in the latest thinking on human behaviour. Furthermore, she notes that "behaviors such as cooperation, sexual behavior, child rearing and aesthetics are [also] seen as 'evolved psychological mechanisms' with an instinctive basis." Spink adds that Steven Pinker similarly asserts that language acquisition is instinctive in humans in his book The Language Instinct (1994). In 1908, William McDougall wrote about the "instinct of curiosity" and its associated "emotion of wonder", though Spink's book does not mention this.

M. S. Blumberg in 2017 examined the use of the word instinct, finding that it varied significantly.

== In humans ==
Among possible examples of instinct-influenced behaviour in humans are the following.

1. Congenital preparedness for developing fear of snakes and spiders was found in six-month-old babies.
2. Infant cry is believed to be a manifestation of instinct. The infant cannot otherwise protect itself for survival during its long period of maturation. The maternal and paternal bond manifest particularly in response to the infant cry. Its mechanism has been partly elucidated by observations with functional MRI of the parent's brain.
3. The herd instinct is found in human children and chimpanzee infants, but is apparently absent in the young orangutans.
4. Hormones are linked to specific forms of human behaviour, such as sexuality. High levels of testosterone are often associated in a person (male or female) with aggressiveness. Decrease in testosterone level after the birth of a child was found among fathers.
5. Hygiene behaviour in humans was suggested to be partly instinctive, based on emotions such as disgust.
6. Maternal bond or maternal instinct is when a mother develops a relationship to a child to provide for its well-being. Maternal oxytocin is the hormone and neuropeptide thought to be responsible for predisposing women to showing bonding behavior and bonding.
7. Self-preservation in people generally is when they have the instinct to survive.
8. Fight-or-flight response in human beings has been said to be a particular response to the arising harmful event, attack or threat to survival.
9. Cooperation or social instinct has been postulated as an instinct necessary for the future survival of people.
10. Resistance towards change is the difficulty experienced by a person when they are trying to push against the suggestions made to change behavior or accept certain treatments regardless of whether it will improve their condition or not.
11. Adaptive behaviour to environment is an inherited innate phenotypic characteristic, whether inherited as instincts intricately, or as a neuropsychological capacity that furthers learning. Examples are mating, searching for food, situational awareness, establishing the pecking order and vocalizations.

== Reflexes ==
A gecko hunts the pointer of a mouse, confused with prey.

Examples of behaviours that do not require thought include many reflexes. The stimulus in a reflex may not require brain activity but instead may travel to the spinal cord as a message that is then transmitted back through the body, tracing a path called the reflex arc. Reflexes are similar to fixed action patterns in that most reflexes meet the criteria of a fixed action pattern. However, a fixed action pattern can be processed in the brain as well; a male stickleback's instinctive aggression towards anything red during his mating season is such an example. Examples of instinctive behaviours in humans include many of the primitive reflexes, such as rooting and suckling, behaviours which are present in mammals. In rats, it has been observed that innate responses are related to specific chemicals, and these chemicals are detected by two organs located in the nose: the vomeronasal organ (VNO) and the main olfactory epithelium (MOE).

== Maturational ==
Some instinctive behaviours depend on maturational processes to appear. For instance, we commonly refer to birds "learning" to fly. However, young birds have been experimentally reared in devices that prevent them from moving their wings until they reached the age at which their cohorts were flying. These birds flew immediately and normally when released, showing that their improvement resulted from neuromuscular maturation and not true learning.

== In evolution ==
Imprinting provides one example of instinct. This complex response may involve visual, auditory, and olfactory cues in the environment surrounding an organism. In some cases, imprinting attaches an offspring to its parent, which is a reproductive benefit to offspring survival. If an offspring has attachment to a parent, it is more likely to stay nearby under parental protection. Attached offspring are also more likely to learn from a parental figure when interacting closely. (Reproductive benefits are a driving force behind natural selection.)

Environment is an important factor in the evolution of innate behaviour. A hypothesis of Michael McCollough, a positive psychologist, explains that environment plays a key role in human behaviours such as forgiveness and revenge. This hypothesis theorizes that various social environments cause either forgiveness or revenge to prevail. McCollough relates his theory to game theory. In a tit-for-tat strategy, cooperation and retaliation are comparable to forgiveness and revenge. The choice between the two can be beneficial or detrimental, depending on what the partner-organism chooses. Though this psychological example of game theory does not have such directly measurable results, it provides an interesting theory of unique thought. From a more biological standpoint, the brain's limbic system operates as the main control-area for response to certain stimuli, including a variety of instinctual behaviour. The limbic system processes external stimuli related to emotions, social activity, and motivation, which propagates a behavioural response. Some behaviours include maternal care, aggression, defense, and social hierarchy. These behaviours are influenced by sensory input—sight, sound, touch, and smell.

Within the circuitry of the limbic system, there are various places where evolution could have taken place, or could take place in the future. For example, many rodents have receptors in the vomeronasal organ that respond explicitly to predator stimuli that specifically relate to that individual species of rodent. The reception of a predatory stimulus usually creates a response of defense or fear. Mating in rats follows a similar mechanism. The vomeronasal organ and the main olfactory epithelium, together called the olfactory system, detect pheromones from the opposite sex. These signals then travel to the medial amygdala, which disperses the signal to a variety of brain parts. The pathways involved with innate circuitry are extremely specialized and specific. Various organs and sensory receptors play parts in this complex process.

Instinct is a phenomenon that can be investigated from a multitude of angles: genetics, limbic system, nervous pathways, and environment. Researchers can study levels of instincts, from molecular to groups of individuals. Extremely specialized systems have evolved, resulting in individuals which exhibit behaviours without learning them.

== See also ==
- Drive theory
- Ethology
- Genetic memory
- Heuristic
- Human ethology
- Innatism
- Prey drive (hunting instinct)
- Psychological nativism
- Rationality
- Sociobiology
- Unconscious mind
