= International Society for Human Ethology =

- Abbreviation: ISHE
- Merged into: European Sociobiological Society (2000)
- Formation: 1972
- Founders: Irenaus Eibl-Eibesfeldt, Daniel G. Freedman, William Charlesworth
- Type: Learned society
- President: S. Craig Roberts
- Vice President: Elisabeth Oberzaucher
- Main organ: Human Ethology
- Website: ishe.org

The International Society for Human Ethology (abbreviated ISHE) is an international learned society dedicated to the study of human ethology. It was founded in 1972, with Irenaus Eibl-Eibesfeldt, Daniel G. Freedman, and William Charlesworth all playing key roles in its establishment; Eibl-Eibesfeldt also served as the society's first president. It publishes the peer-reviewed scientific journal Human Ethology.

In the late 1960s and early 1970s, there was an upsurge in research into human behaviour influenced by the ethological approach. In 1972, as a result of informal contacts among researchers from the University of Chicago who had gathered around Daniel G. Freedman, a group around Irenaus Eibl-Eibesfeld at the Max-Planck-Institute in Seewiesen and researchers from William Charlesworth ´s group at the University of Minnesota, a small group of somewhat innocent, self-labeled human ethologists held the first international meeting at the University of Minnesota. Attendance consisted mostly of German, Canadian, and American students.

ISHE was founded with the aim of promoting the exchange of knowledge and ideas concerning human ethology between scientists from a variety of disciplines.

== Meetings ==
As Bill Charlesworth writes, the first meetings were “a modest beginning to say the least, but it did lead later to two much larger, more sophisticated meetings in 1974. The first one was held at the Max Planck Institute for Behavioural Physiology in Starnberg-Seewiesen; the second immediately followed in London under the sponsorship of Nick Blurton-Jones. Both meetings were very well attended and, despite much healthy disagreement on about almost everything, it became apparent that a substantive scientific enterprise was in the making”.

After a while a pattern developed where the biennial meetings alternated between America and Europe.

From the 1980s a meeting was held in each of the intervening years, then called “Summer School” whose emphasis was on helping young researchers acquire knowledge and understanding of the ethological approaches, its ideas, and methods. These meetings, now called “Summer Institutes” gradually grew in size to match the biennial congresses, with submitted papers and symposia, but retained sections which emphasised educating young researchers.

The topics covered may be seen in the conference abstracts of recent years.

== Publication ==
In 1974, the first Human Ethology Newsletter was published “as a means of establishing contact between those interested in studying human behaviour from an ethological or evolutionary perspective”. The editors, Don Omark and Bob Marvin, managed to produce several newsletters a year gathering together information about meetings and publications connected with human ethology, abstracts of presentations, reviews and news of forthcoming ISHE meetings.

A major theme in the early editions was “What is Human Ethology?” with papers by many distinguished ethologists and others. Peter Smith of Sheffield University crystallised two strands of thought. One which emphasised “observation of behaviour in natural environments”, and the other which emphasised “an evolutionary approach to human behaviour”. The first strand by itself did not distinguish human ethology from a large number of psychological studies. The extreme of the second approach developed as “evolutionary psychology” which has been criticised for developing “Just So” stories to give an “evolutionary explanation” to aspects of human behaviour which in any case had been derived more from everyday culture than from good direct observation. Robert Hinde pointed out the danger of making “slick armchair assumptions about function or evolution. It's lovely fun to speculate about the evolutionary bases for cigarette smoking or the relatIonship [sic?] between the attractiveness of breasts and bottoms, but it's hardly science”.

Michael Chance emphasised the importance of observation of behaviour, as unrestrained as possible, as a necessary precursor to any analysis and explanation, but observation from a biological perspective. Glyn Collis, Ewan Grant and Mary Ainsworth all argued for the necessity of both aspects. The fact that this discussion was had at all shows how difficult it often is for many people to adopt the biological approach when they have cut their intellectual teeth in the social sciences.

The Newsletter expanded and continued, and in 1995, it developed into the Human Ethology Bulletin. In 2012, the journal moved to an on-line format publishing peer-reviewed scholarly articles. It was renamed Human Ethology in 2019 and continues the practice of publishing one volume per calendar year, utilising the flexibility of the on-line format to add articles as they are accepted.

== Awards ==
The society makes several awards

Owen Aldis Awards. These are small research grants to pre-doctoral researchers to encourage work within the ethological paradigm, particularly involving direct observation.

Linda Mealy Awards These are given to junior scientists for new research of high quality in human ethology reported at each biennial Congress.

Poster awards. The poster is an important medium for scientific communication, allowing detailed, nuanced and extensive discussion between the presenter and the viewer. Since 2006, ISHE has given awards for the best posters at Congressesferences and Summer Institutes.
