= Faculty of Science, Charles University =

Faculty of Charles University located in Prague, Czechia

Faculty of Science Charles University
- Přírodovědecká fakulta Univerzity Karlovy
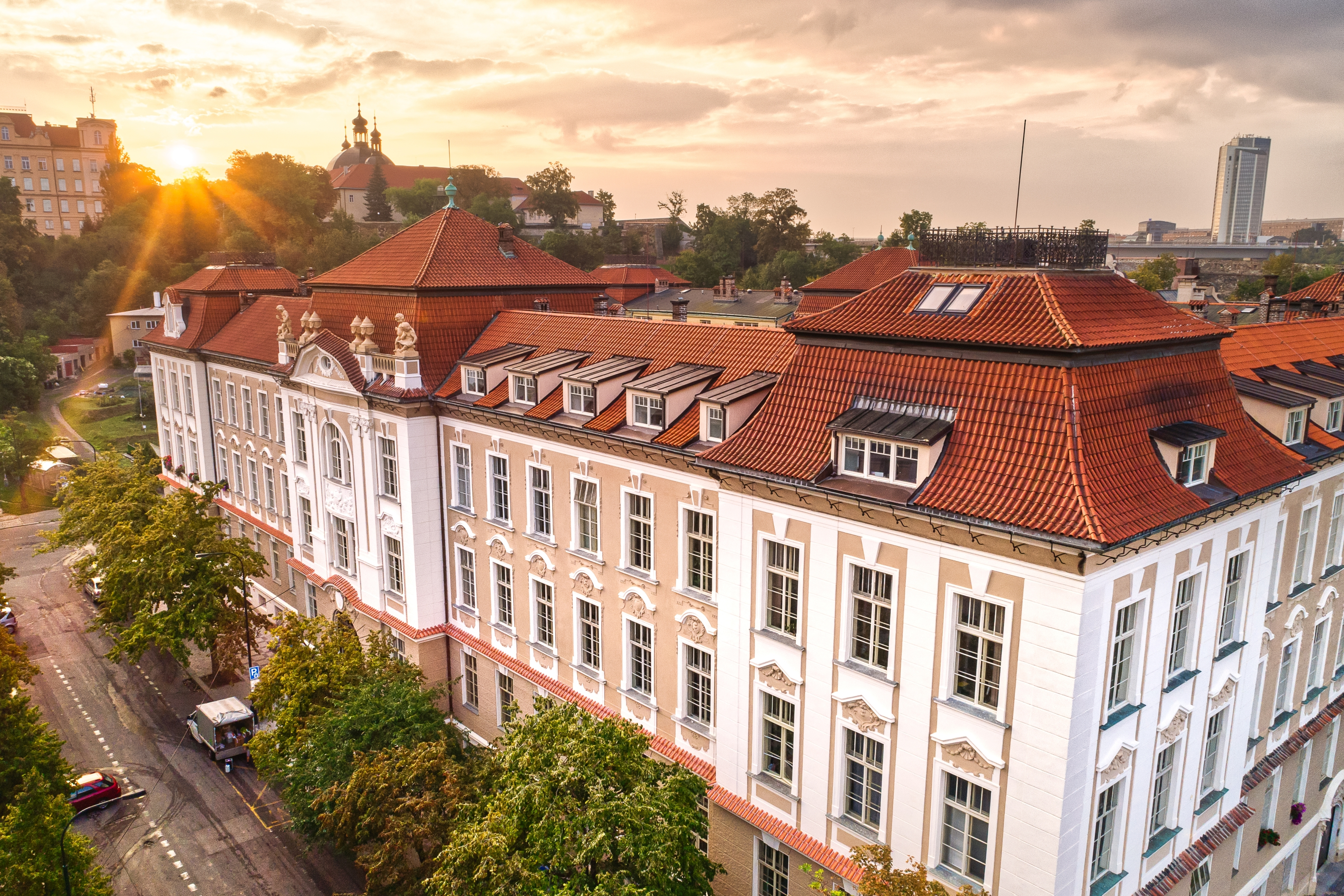
- Building of the dean's office
- Latin: Facultas Rerum Naturalium, Universitas Carolina
- Type: Faculty
- Established: 1920; 106 years ago
- Parent institution: Charles University
- Dean: doc. RNDr. Ing. Vladimír Krylov, Ph.D.
- Location: Prague, Czech Republic; 50.068889°N 14.424658°E
- Website: www.natur.cuni.cz/eng
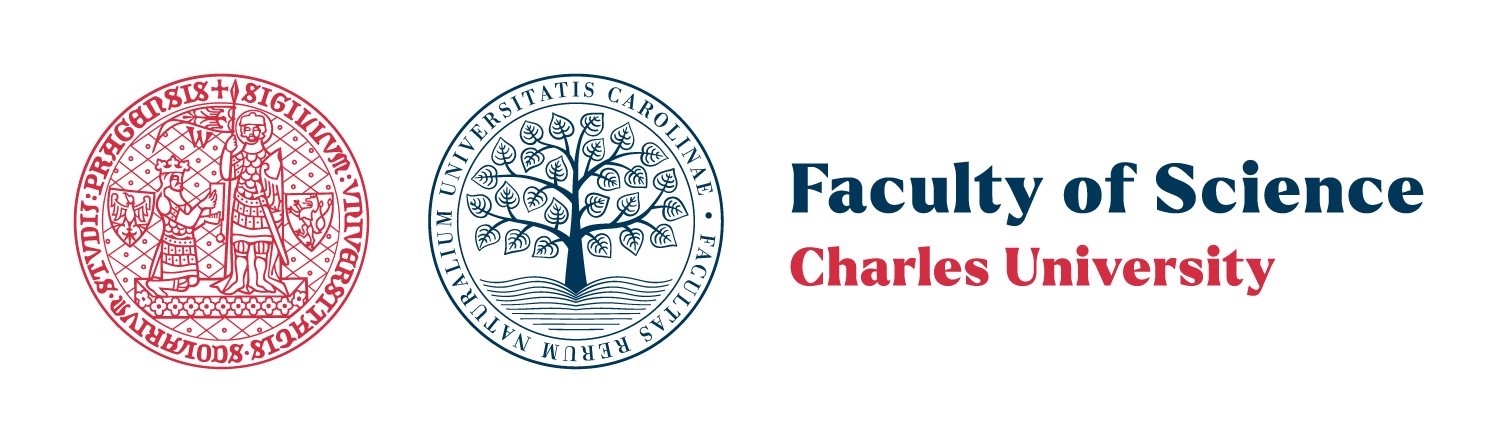

Location: Prague, Czech Republic

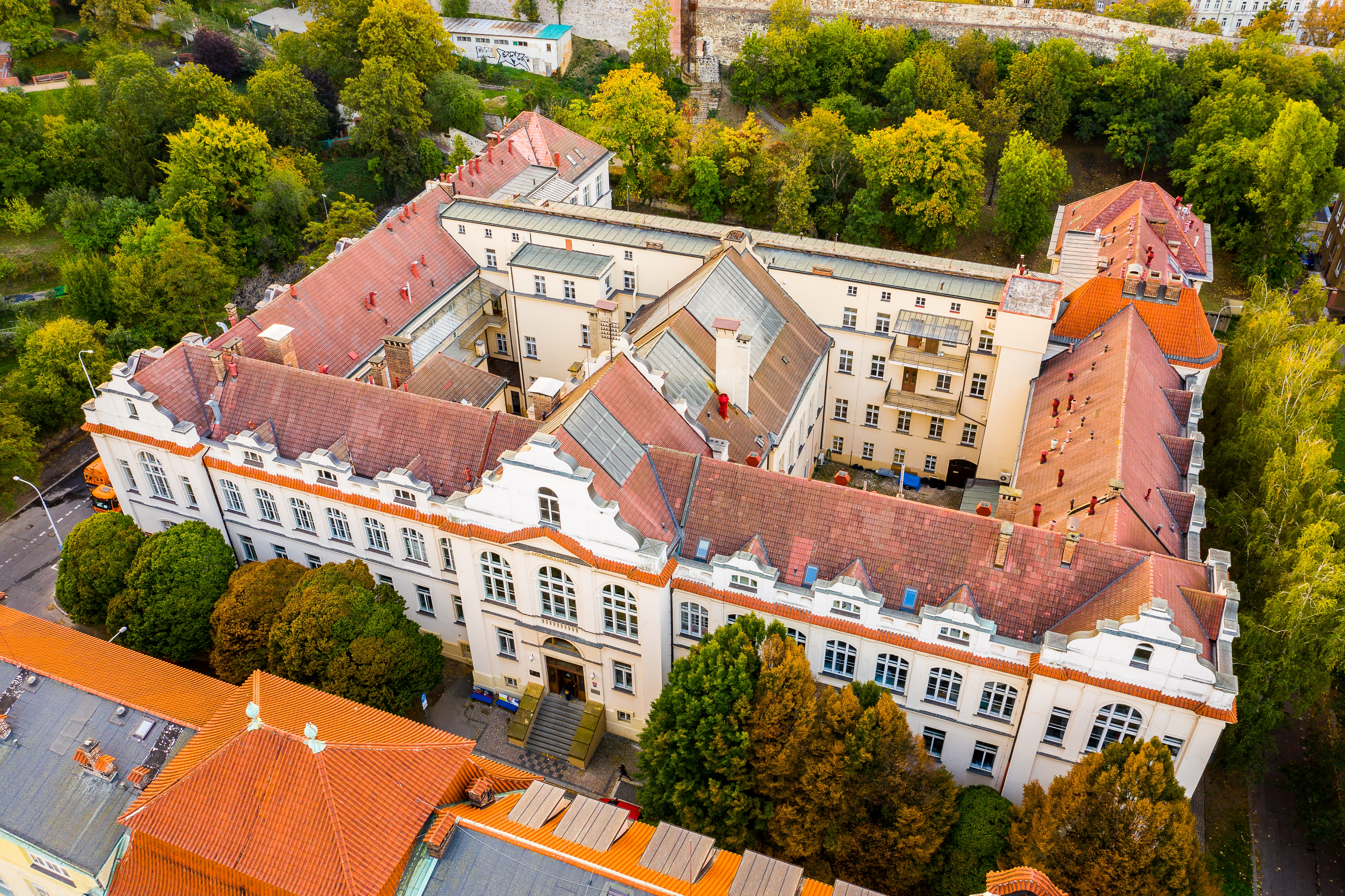
Building of chemical institutes Hlavova 8, Prague 2

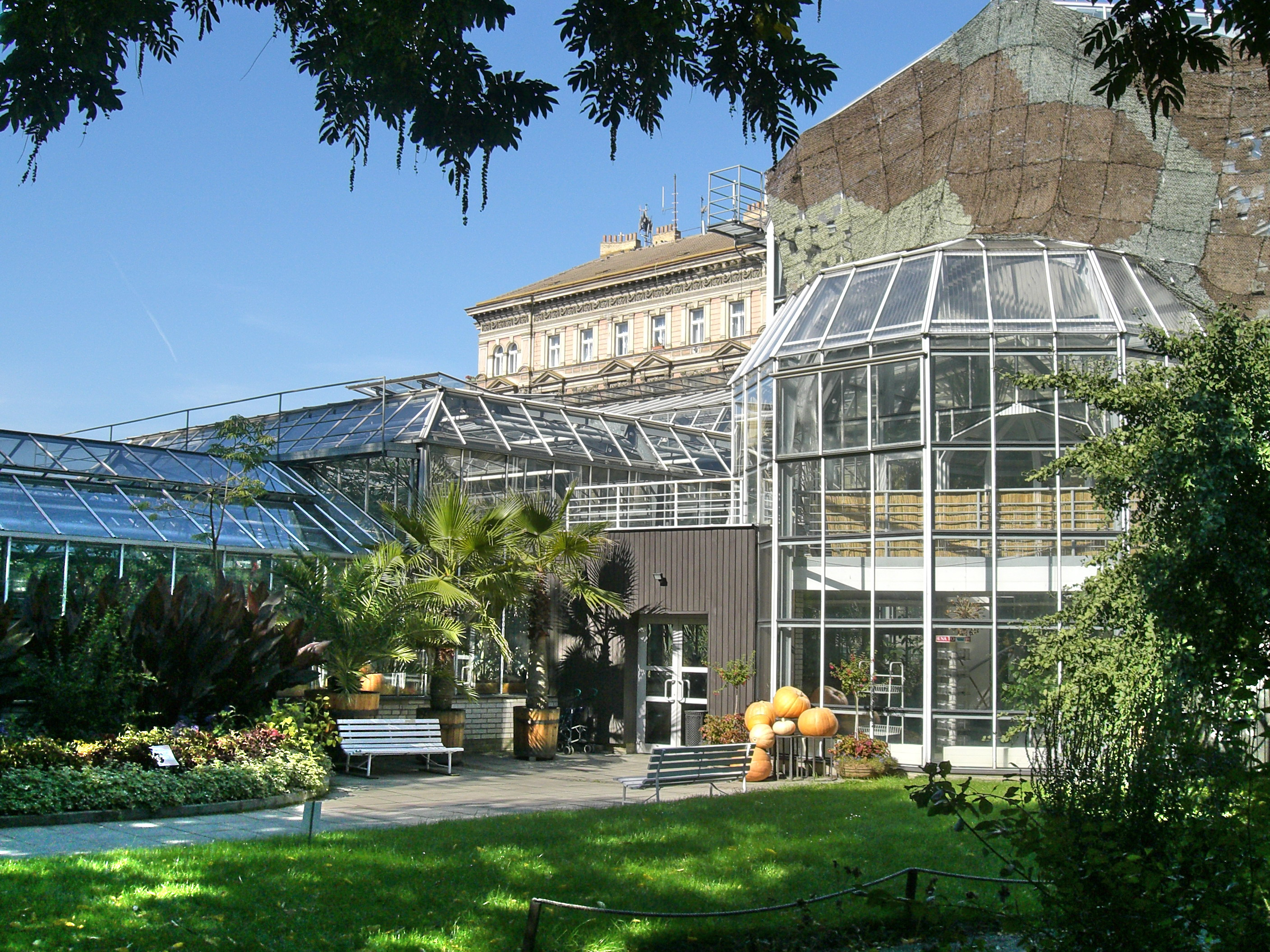
Botanical Gardens of the faculty, Na Slupi, Prague 2

The Faculty of Science, Charles University (Czech: Přírodovědecká fakulta Univerzity Karlovy, PřF UK) is one of the 17 faculties of Charles University in Prague, Czech Republic. It focuses upon research in areas of biology, chemistry, geology, and geography.

== History ==
=== Before the separation from the Faculty of Arts ===
The natural sciences were taught at the Faculty of Arts of Charles University. The faculty prepared their students to become secondary school teachers, pharmacists, or civil servants. In the second half of the 19th century, lectures in the Czech language were established. The division of the university into Czech and German in 1882 was a key point in the history of natural sciences in Czech lands. It led to the emancipation of Czech science.

=== Constitution of the faculty ===
Science professors at the Faculty of Arts proposed a motion for the division of the faculty into two separate ones. Despite the dismissal of the ministry, the idea of a separate faculty for the natural sciences was promoted successfully. The faculty's constitution was delayed because of World War I. The Faculty of Science was established in 1920, and its first dean was mathematician Karel Petr.

=== Nazi occupation ===
The Faculty of Science was closed on 17 October 1939. The reason for the closure was demonstrations in Prague on 28 October, during Independence Day. The faculty was reopened after the end of World War II. The semester began on 1 June 1945.

=== Rule of communists ===
After the Communist Party of Czechoslovakia took power in 1948, the Soviet model of education and science was implemented. Such things like the school of thought of Lysenkoism were forced to be leading in the academic sphere because of the ideological reasons.

There were two waves of political vetting. The first one happened at the beginning of the 1950s and the second during normalization in 1969–1971. Many academicians were forced to leave the faculty. The change came with the Velvet Revolution in 1989. The 17 November demonstration began at Albertov which is near to the faculty dean's office. Students of the Faculty of Science participated in the demonstration that lead to the events that ended the rule of communists in Czechoslovakia.

=== COVID-19 pandemic ===
During the COVID-19 pandemic, several experts from the Faculty of Science became well known in the Czech Republic, including Jaroslav Flegr, Václav Hořejší, and Dagmar Dzúrová.

=== Campus ===
It features rocks that chronicle the geological evolution of the Czech Republic over the last 600 million years.

== Academics ==
The Faculty of Science of Charles University is engaged in research in a wide range of environmental, geological, chemical, and biological disciplines. In recent years, around 640 articles in international journals have been published annually by the staff and students of the Faculty of Science. In its materials, the faculty states that in recent years the number of articles published in impact periodicals has been increasing. The Faculty of Science ranks first in the annual evaluation of the results of research organizations in the Czech Republic, which is published by the Council for Research, Development, and Innovation. In 2009 and 2010, only the Faculty of Mathematics and Physics of Charles University and the Institute of Physics of the Academy of Sciences of the Czech Republic significantly surpassed it in the overall point evaluation; In both years, the Masaryk University Faculty of Science received approximately the same number of points as the Faculty of Science. The faculty is the researcher or co-researcher of ten research projects (as of 2009) and the research was largely financed from the funds for these research projects. Another source of funds is the financing of so-called research centres.

The research goals of the biological section are "ecological processes in the evolution of model groups of organisms" and "signalling and molecular mechanisms of cellular response", the goals of the chemical section are "new molecular systems for advanced health-beneficial and environmentally friendly applications", the research project of the geographical section is called "geographic systems and risk processes in the context of global changes and European integration" and the geological research project is "mechanisms of substance transport in the upper spheres of the earth".

== Organization ==
The faculty consists of the following sections and departments:

Organization of the Faculty of Science, Charles University
Biology Section	Chemistry Section	Geography Section	Geology Section	Faculty-wide institutions
Departments: Anthropology and Human Genetics, Biology Education, Botany, Cell Biology, Ecology, Experimental Plant Biology, Genetics and Microbiology, Parasitology, Philosophy and History of Science, Physiology, and Zoology	Departments: Analytical Chemistry, Biochemistry, Chemistry Education, Inorganic Chemistry, Organic Chemistry, and Physical and Macromolecular Chemistry	Departments: Applied Geoinformatics and Cartography, Demography and Geodemography, Physical Geography and Geoecology, and Social Geography and Regional Development	Institutes: Geochemistry, Mineralogy and Mineral Resources, Geology and Paleontology, Hydrogeology, Engineering Geology and Applied Geophysics, and Petrology and Structural Geology	Institute of Applied Mathematics and Information Technologies Department of Physical Education Institute for Environmental Studies Botanical Garden
