= Brian K. Hall =

American embryologist and academic

- Born: 1941 (age 84–85)
- Known for: Neural Crest as a Fourth Germ Layer
- Scientific career
- Institutions: Dalhousie University

Brian Keith Hall FRSC (born 1941) is the George S. Campbell Professor of Biology and University Research Professor Emeritus at Dalhousie University in Halifax, Nova Scotia. Hall has researched and extensively written on bone and cartilage formation in developing vertebrate embryos. He is an active participant in the evolutionary developmental biology (EVO-DEVO) debate on the nature and mechanisms of animal body plan formation. Hall has proposed that the neural crest tissue of vertebrates may be viewed as a fourth embryonic germ layer. As such, the neural crest - in Hall's view - plays a role equivalent to that of the endoderm, mesoderm, and ectoderm of bilaterian development and is a definitive feature of vertebrates (as hypothesized by Gans and Northcutt[1983]). As such, vertebrates are the only quadroblastic, rather than triploblastic bilaterian animals. In vertebrates the neural crest serves to integrate the somatic division (derived from ectoderm and mesoderm) and visceral division (derived from endoderm and mesoderm) together via a wide range novel vertebrate tissues (bone, cartilage, sympathetic nervous system, etc...).

He has been associated with Dalhousie University since 1968. Since his retirement in 2007, he has been University Research Professor Emeritus and Emeritus Professor of Biology.

== Early life and education ==
Hall is the son of Doris Garrad and Harry Hall. He was born in Port Kembla, New South Wales, on 28 October 1941. He attended the University of New England in Armidale, New South Wales, receiving a B.Sc. in zoology in 1963, a B.Sc. (Honors) in zoology in 1965, a Ph.D. in zoology in 1968 and a D.Sc. in biological sciences in 1978.

His Ph.D. thesis, undertaken under the supervision of Patrick D. F. Murray, FAA (Fellow of the Australian Academy), concerned the differentiation of bone and secondary cartilage in chicken embryos.

== Career ==
Over the course of his career, Hall's laboratory research has focused on developmental biology and evolutionary biology. His work played a major role in integrating these two fields into the discipline now known as Evolutionary Developmental Biology (evo-devo). He and his students, according to one source, "pioneered an epigenetic view of bone differentiation and of vertebrate development in general, and highlighted the importance of epigenetic tissue interactions in vertebrate evolution." His 1975 paper "Evolutionary consequences of skeletal differentiation" (American Zoologist) marked the beginning of "the process of building a bridge between evolutionary and developmental biology from the developmental biology side." His 1992 textbook Evolutionary Developmental Biology is widely viewed as definitive. "This work defines a field, which, in turn, has revitalized the study of evolution," writes one source.

Hall is particularly interested in the vertebrate neural crest and in skeletal tissues that arise from neural crest cells.

He has also written extensively about the history of evolutionary biology and about leading figures in the field. "Hall's understanding of the intellectual roots of his discipline," one source observes, "deepens his perspective on current theoretical issues and colors much of his writing."

Hall has spent his career in the Biology Department of Dalhousie University in Halifax, Nova Scotia, where he was hired as an assistant professor in 1968. He was made full professor in 1975, was Chair of the department from 1978 to 1985, was Izaak Walton Killam Research Professor from 1990 to 1995, was Faculty of Science Killam Professor of Biology from 1996 to 2001, George S. Campbell Professor of Biology from 2001 to 2007, and University Research Professor from 2002 to 2007.

He was also Canada Council for the Arts Killiam Research Fellow from 2003 to 2005. Since 2007, he has been University Research Professor Emeritus and Emeritus Professor of Biology.

In 2008 he was appointed Visiting Distinguished Professor at Arizona State University in Tempe, Arizona.

== Retirement ==
Hall retired in July 2007 and became a University Research Professor Emeritus and Emeritus Professor of Biology. He continued to hold NSERC research funding until 2017 and continues to collaborate in research with a number of colleagues in Canada, England, Belgium and The USA.

== Honors and awards ==
Hall received the first D.Sc. in Biological Sciences from The University of New England in 1978.

He was elected a Fellow of the Royal Society of Canada (FRSC) in 1985, won the Fry Medal from the Canadian Society of Zoologists in 1994, won the International Craniofacial Biology Distinguished Scientist Award in 1996, and won the Alexander Kowalevsky Medal and honorary membership in the Saint-Petersburg Society of Naturalists in 2001.

He was elected a Foreign Honorary Member of the American Academy of Arts & Sciences in 2002, won an NSERC Award of Excellence in Research in 2002, won a Canada Council for the Arts Killam Research Fellowship for 2003-2005, was named an honorary member of The Golden Key International Honour Society in 2003, and won the $100,000 Killam Prize in Neural Sciences from the Canada Council for the Arts in 2005.

The "Hall Award" was established by the Canadian Society of Zoologists in 2006 for the best student platform paper presented in the Comparative Morphology and Development Division at the Society annual meeting.

He was awarded an honorary Doctor of Laws (LL.D) degree by the University of Calgary in June 2014.

== Selected publications ==
=== Books ===
Hall's earlier books include:

- Hall, Brian K. (1977), Chondrogenesis of the Somitic Mesoderm, Advances in Anatomy, Embryology, and Cell Biology, vol. 53, Springer-Verlag, pp. 3–47, ISBN 9780387084640, ISSN 0301-5556, PMID 337766
- —— (1978), Developmental and cellular skeletal biology, Academic Press, ISBN 9780123189509This book and Elsevier/Academic Press received a BMA (British Medical Association) certificate of distinction at the BMA annual awards ceremony in 2015.
- —— (1983), Cartilage: Structure, function, and biochemistry, Academic Press, ISBN 978-0-12-319501-2
- ——; Olson, Wendy M (2003), Keywords and Concepts in Evolutionary Developmental Biology, Cambridge, Massachusetts: Harvard University Press, ISBN 978-0-674-00904-2
- ——; Pearson, Roy D.; Müller, Gerd B., eds. (2004), Environment, Development, and Evolution: Toward a Synthesis, Cambridge, Massachusetts: Massachusetts Institute of Technology, ISBN 978-0-262-08319-5
- —— (2005), Bones and Cartilage: Developmental and Evolutionary Skeletal Biology, San Diego, California & London: Elsevier Academic Press, ISBN 978-0-12-31906-04

Hall and Norman Maclean's 1987 book Cell Commitment and Differentiation (CUP Archive) examines the processes of activation and regulation that make possible the controlled expression of restricted sets of genes in plant and animal species.

Hall 's 1999 book The Neural Crest in Development and Evolution (Springer) recounts the discovery, origins, and cellular derivatives of the neural crest and neural crest cells in agnathan and jawed vertebrates or gnathostomes. It addresses the role of the germ layers in early embryogenesis, the development of nervous systems, and the evolution of the vertebrate head. It also examines mutations, tumors, and the exposure of embryos to exogenous agents.

The Origin and Evolution of Larval Forms by Hall and Marvalee H. Wake (Academic Press, 1999) is concerned with larvae, which "represent one of the classic problems of evolutionary biology and may explain how new body plans originate."

Hall and Benedikt Hallgrímsson, published Variation: A Central Concept in Biology (Elsevier/ Academic Press, 2005; Academic Press, 2011). it is a study of "variation between individuals within the same species," a phenomenon that, although central to evolutionary biology, has "remained peripheral to the study of mechanisms of evolutionary change." The book seeks to "bring...variation back to the center of the evolutionary stage." Carl D. Schlichting, reviewing the book in Bioscience, called the book "authoritative." Daniel E. Lieberman of Harvard called the book "comprehensive, diverse and stimulating...a must-read for anyone interested in development and evolution...a tour-de-force treatment of a critical subject."

Hall 's 2007 book Fins into Limbs. Development, Transformation, and Evolution was published by University of Chicago Press. In a review for Science, Alan C. Love wrote that "Fins into Limbs is an exploration of a longstanding evolutionary puzzle associated with the origin of tetrapods and the vertebrate invasion of land. Brian Hall has assembled a stellar array of contributors from various fields that represent the pieces necessary for a solution." Love called the book "handsomely executed and also timely...a necessary reference and a worthy guide to future research on this and other evolutionary transitions." Mark W. Hamrick, in the Journal of Mammal Evolution, wrote that "in driving a new era of research in skeletal biology, Fins into Limbs is a great success." Michael J. Benton, in Evolution and Development, called the book "essential reading for a broad range of natural scientists, from embryologists to paleontologists, and geneticists to philosophers." And Michel Laurin, in Copeia, called it "an indispensable reference for all scientists interested in the origin, development and evolution of limbs."

Hall and Benedikt Hallgrimsson wrote Epigenetics: Linking Genotype and Phenotype in Development and Evolution (University of California Press, 2011). A review BioScience describes Chapters 4 and 5 of the book as "an excellent primer for genomic methylation and histone modification" and praises its concluding section as "a tour de force review of epigenetic disorders in mammals." Hall and Hallgrimsson, according to the reviewer, "make...a convincing case for an 'epigenetic revolution', at least in medicine."
