= Human ethology =

Study of human behavior

Human ethology is the study of human behavior. Ethology as a discipline is generally thought of as a sub-category of biology, though psychological theories have been developed based on ethological ideas (e.g. sociobiology, evolutionary psychology, attachment theory, and theories about human universals such as gender differences, incest avoidance, mourning, hierarchy and pursuit of possession). The bridging between biological sciences and social sciences creates an understanding of human ethology. The International Society for Human Ethology is dedicated to advancing the study and understanding of human ethology.

== History ==
Ethology has its roots in the study of evolution, especially after evolution's increasing popularity after Darwin's detailed observations. It became a distinct discipline in the 1930s with zoologists Konrad Lorenz, Niko Tinbergen and Karl Von Frisch. These three scientists are known as the major contributors to human ethology. They are also regarded as the fathers or founders of ethology. Konrad Lorenz and Niko Tinbergen rejected theories that relied on stimuli and learning alone, and elaborated on concepts that had not been well understood, such as instinct. They promoted the theory that evolution had placed within creatures innate abilities and responses to certain stimuli that advanced the thriving of the species. Konrad Lorenz also indicated in his earlier works that animal behavior can be a major reference for human behavior. He believed that the research and findings of animal behaviors can lead to findings of human behaviors as well. In 1943, Lorenz devoted much of his book, Die angeborenen Formen moglicher Erfahrung, to human behavior. He designated that one of the most important factors of ethology was testing the hypothesis derived from animal behavioral studies on human behavioral studies. Due to Lorenz promoting the similarities between studying animal and human behavior, human ethology derived from the study of anima behavior. The other founders of ethology, Niko Tinbergen and Karl von Frisch, received a Nobel Prize in 1973, for their overarching career discoveries concerning organization and elicitation of individual and social behavior patterns.

Many developmental psychologists were eager to incorporate ethological principles into their theories as a way of explaining observable phenomenon in babies that could not necessarily be explained by learning or other concepts. John Bowlby and Mary Ainsworth used ethology prominently to explain aspects of infant-caretaker‍‍ attachment theory‍‍. Some important attachment concepts related to evolution:

- The Attachment has evolved because it promotes the survival of helpless infants. Primates and other animals reflexively attach themselves physically to their parent, and have some calls that elicit parental attention. Human babies have adaptively developed signaling mechanisms such as crying, babbling, and smiling. These are seen as innate and not learned behaviors, because even children born blind and deaf begin to smile socially at 6 weeks, and cry and babble. These behaviors facilitate contact with the caregiver and increase the likelihood of infant survival.
- Early signaling behaviors and the baby's tendency to look at faces rather than objects lead to attachment between the caretaker and baby that solidifies around 6–9 months of age. Bowlby theorized that this attachment was evolutionarily fundamental to human survival and is the basis for all relationships, even into adulthood.
- Adults are also adaptively bent toward attachment with infants. Typical "baby-ish" features, such as a large head and eyes in proportion to the body, and round cheeks, are features that elicit affection in adults. Many parents also form a "bond" with their newborn baby within hours of its birth, leading to a deep sense of emotional attachment with one's own offspring and increased behaviors that promote infant survival.
- Many of Bowlby's early methods relied heavily on ethological observations of children in their natural environments.

In later years, ethology played a large role in sociobiological theory and ultimately, in evolutionary psychology, which is a relatively new field of study. Evolutionary psychology combines ethology, primatology, anthropology, and other fields to study modern human behavior to adaptive ancestral human behaviors.

== View on human nature‍‍ ==
- Humans are social animals. Just as wolves and lions create packs or hunting groups for self-preservation, humans create complex social structures, including families and nations.
- Humans are "biological organisms that have evolved within a particular environmental niche".
- Intelligence, language, social attachment, aggression, and altruism are part of human nature because they "serve or once served a purpose in the struggle of the species to survive".
- Children's developmental level is defined in terms of biologically based behaviors.
- Human's needs evolve based on their current environment. Humans must adapt in order to survive. Cognitive thinking and communication arose as a result of a need for cooperation amongst individuals for survival.

== View on human nature varies across ethological theorists ==
- Lorenz believed that humans have an automatic, elicited nature of behavior, such as stimuli that elicit fixed action patterns.‍‍ His theory developed from the reflex model and the hydraulic or "flush toilet" model‍‍, which conceptualized behavior patterns of motivation. Certain fixed action patterns developed out of motivation for survival. Instinct is an example of fixed action patterns. Any behavior is instinctive if it is performed in the absence of learning. Reflexes can be instincts. For example, a newborn baby instinctively knows to search for and suckle its mother's breast for ‍‍nourishment. ‍‍
- Bowlby (and many other modern ethological theorists) believed that humans spontaneously act to meet the demands of their environment. They are active participants who seek out a parent, food, or a mate (i.e. an infant will seek to remain within sight of a‍‍ caretaker)‍‍.
- Vygotsky believed that the way humans think is based on the culture they are raised in and the language they are surrounded by. He emphasized that children grow up in the symbols of their culture, especially linguistic symbols. These linguistic symbols categorize and organize the world around them. This organization of the world is internalized, which influence the way they think.
- Human behavior tends to change based on the environment and the surrounding challenges that individuals begin to face. Two evolutionary advances in human behavior began as a way to allow humans to communicate and collaborate. Infrastructure theorist, Mead and Wittgenstein, theorized the creation of a collaboration in human foraging. This collaboration created social goals amongst people and also created a common ground. To coordinate their common goals, humans evolved a new type of cooperative communication. This communication was based on gestures that allowed humans to cooperate amongst themselves in order to achieve their desired goals. This change in behavior is seen due to the evolving of their environment. The environment demands survival and humans adapted their behavior in order to survive. In other words, this is known as the shared intentionality hypothesis. According to this hypothesis, human thinking evolved from a self-focused, individual intentionality as an adaptation for "dealing with problems of social coordination, specifically, problems presented by individuals' attempts to collaborate and communicate with others." This evolution happened in two steps, one leading from individual to "joint intentionality" and the other from joint intentionality to "collective intentionality".
- Mechanistic theories view behavior as passive. This theory argues that human behavior is in passivity through physiological drives and emotional stimuli. Unlike mechanistic theories, organismic theories view behavior as active. An organismic theory argues that an organism is active in its behavior, meaning that it decides how it behaves and initiates its own behaviors. Humans have intrinsic needs that they desire to be met. These needs provide energy for humans to act upon their needs in order to meet them, rather than being reactive to them. The active theory on human behavior treats stimuli not as a cause of behavior, but as opportunities humans can utilize to meet their demands.

== Human ethology topics ==
As applied to human behavior, in the majority of cases, topical behavior results from motivational states and the intensity of a specific external stimulus. Organisms with a high inner motivational state for such a stimulus is called appetitive behavior. Other important concepts of zooethology—e.g., territoriality, hierarchy, sensitive periods in ontogenesis—are also useful when discussing human behavior. Irenäus Eibl-Eibesfeldt's book Human Ethology is most important for how these concepts are applied to human behavior.

Human ethology has contributed in two particular ways to our understanding of the ontogeny of behavior in humans. This has resulted, first, from the application of techniques for the precise observation, description and classification of naturally occurring behavior and, secondly, from the ethological approach to the study of behavior, especially the development of behavior in terms of evolution. Of particular interest are questions relating to the function of a particular kind of behavior (e.g., attachment behavior) and its adaptive value. The description of the behavioral repertoire of a species, the recognition of patterns of behavioral development and the classification of established behavioral patterns are prerequisites for any comparison between different species or between organisms of a single species. The ethological approach is the study of the interaction between the organism with certain innate species-specific structures and the environment for which the organism is genetically programmed.

Invariant behavior patterns have a morphological basis, mainly in neuronal structures common to all members of a species and, depending on the kind of behavior, may also be common to a genus or family or a whole order, e.g., primates, or even to a whole class, e.g., mammals. In such structures we can retrace and follow the evolutionary process by which the environment produced structures, especially nervous systems and brains, which generate adaptive behavior. In organisms with a high level of organization, the processes in which the ethologist is especially interested are those genetically preprogrammed motor and perceptual processes that facilitate social interaction and communication, such as facial expression and vocalization. If we consider the most highly developed means of communication, language and speech, which is found in humans alone, the question arises as to the biological foundation of this species-specific behavior and perceptual skill. The ethologist examines this question primarily from the point of view of ontogenetic development.

The main strength of human ethology has been its application of established interpretive patterns to new problems. Based on theories, concepts and methods that have proved successful in animal ethology, it looks at human behavior from a new viewpoint. The essence of this is the evolutionary perspective. But since ethologists have been relatively unaffected by the long history of the humanities, they often refer to facts and interpretations neglected by other social sciences. If we look back at the history of the relationship between the life sciences and the social sciences, we find two prevailing modes of theoretical orientation: on the one hand, reductionism, i.e., attempts to reduce human action to non-cognitive behavior; and on the other, attempts to separate human action and human society from the animal world completely. The advent of the theory of evolution in the 19th century brought no easy solution to the problem of nature and nurture, since it could still be "solved" in either a continuous or discontinuous manner. Human ethology as much as any other discipline significantly contributes to the obsolescence of such simple dichotomies.

Human Ethology has an increasing influence on the dialogue between Human Sciences and Humanities as shown for example in the book Being Human - Bridging the Gap between the Sciences of Body and Mind.

== Methodology ==
‍‍Ethologists‍‍ study behavior using two general methods: naturalistic observation and laboratory experimentation. Ethologist's insistence on observing organisms in their natural environment differentiates ethology from related disciplines such as evolutionary psychology and sociobiology, and their naturalistic observation "ranks as one of their main contributions to psychology", Naturalistic Observation Ethologists believe that in order to study species-specific behaviors, a species must be observed in its natural environment. One can only understand the function of a behavior by seeing how it specifically fits into the ‍‍species‍‍ natural environment to fulfill a specific need. Ethologists follow a specific set of steps when studying an organism:

Ethogram	A detailed description of the behavior of a species in its natural environment
Classification	Classify behaviors according to their function (how they encourage survival).
Compare	Compare how a behavior functions in different species and how different behaviors may serve the same function in other species.
Laboratory Experiments	Determine the immediate causes of the behavior described in the first three steps.

These steps fall in line with Tinbergen's "On Aims of Methods of Ethology" in which he states that every study of behavior must answer four questions to be considered legitimate:

- function (adaptation)
- evolution (phylogeny)
- causation (mechanism)
- development (ontogeny)

== Diversity ==
Diversity is an important concept in ethology and evolutionary theory, both genetically and culturally.

Genetic diversity serves as a way for populations to adapt to changing environments. With more variation, it is more likely that some individuals in a population will possess variations of alleles that are suited for the environment. Those individuals are more likely to survive to produce offspring bearing that allele. The population will continue for more generations because of the success of these individuals. Population genetics includes several hypotheses and theories regarding genetic diversity. The neutral theory of evolution proposes that diversity is the result of the accumulation of neutral substitutions. Diversifying selection is the hypothesis that two subpopulations of a species live in different environments that select for different alleles at a particular locus. This may occur, for instance, if a species has a large range relative to the mobility of individuals within it.

Cultural diversity is also important. From a cultural transmission standpoint, humans are the only animals to pass down cumulative cultural knowledge to their offspring. While chimpanzees can learn to use tools by watching other chimps around them, but humans are able to pool their cognitive resources to create increasingly more complex solutions to problems and more complex ways of interacting with their environments. The diversity of cultures points to the idea that humans are shaped by their environments, and also interact with environments to shape them as well. Cultural diversity arises from different human adaptations to different environmental factors, which in turn shapes the environment, which in turn again shapes human behavior. This cycle results in diverse cultural representations that ultimately add to the survival of the human species. This approach is important as a way to build a bridge between biological and social sciences, which creates a better understanding of human ethology.

One example of human diversity is sexual orientation. Ethologists have long noted that there are over 250 species of animals which display homosexual behaviors. Although no offspring are directly created from homosexual behaviors, a closer look reveals how the genes for homosexuality can persist. Homosexuality could decrease competition for heterosexual mates. Homosexual family members could increase the resources available to the children of their siblings without producing offspring to compete for those resources (the gay uncle theory), thus creating better chances for their siblings' offspring to survive. These related offspring share the homosexual individual's genes—although to a lesser extent than direct offspring would—including genes for homosexuality. This causes a small but stable chance for future generations to be gay as well, even if the gay family member produces no direct descendants.

== See also ==
- Cultural anthropology
