= Kiki Station =

Railway station in Minami, Tokushima Prefecture, Japan

M19 Kiki Station 木岐駅
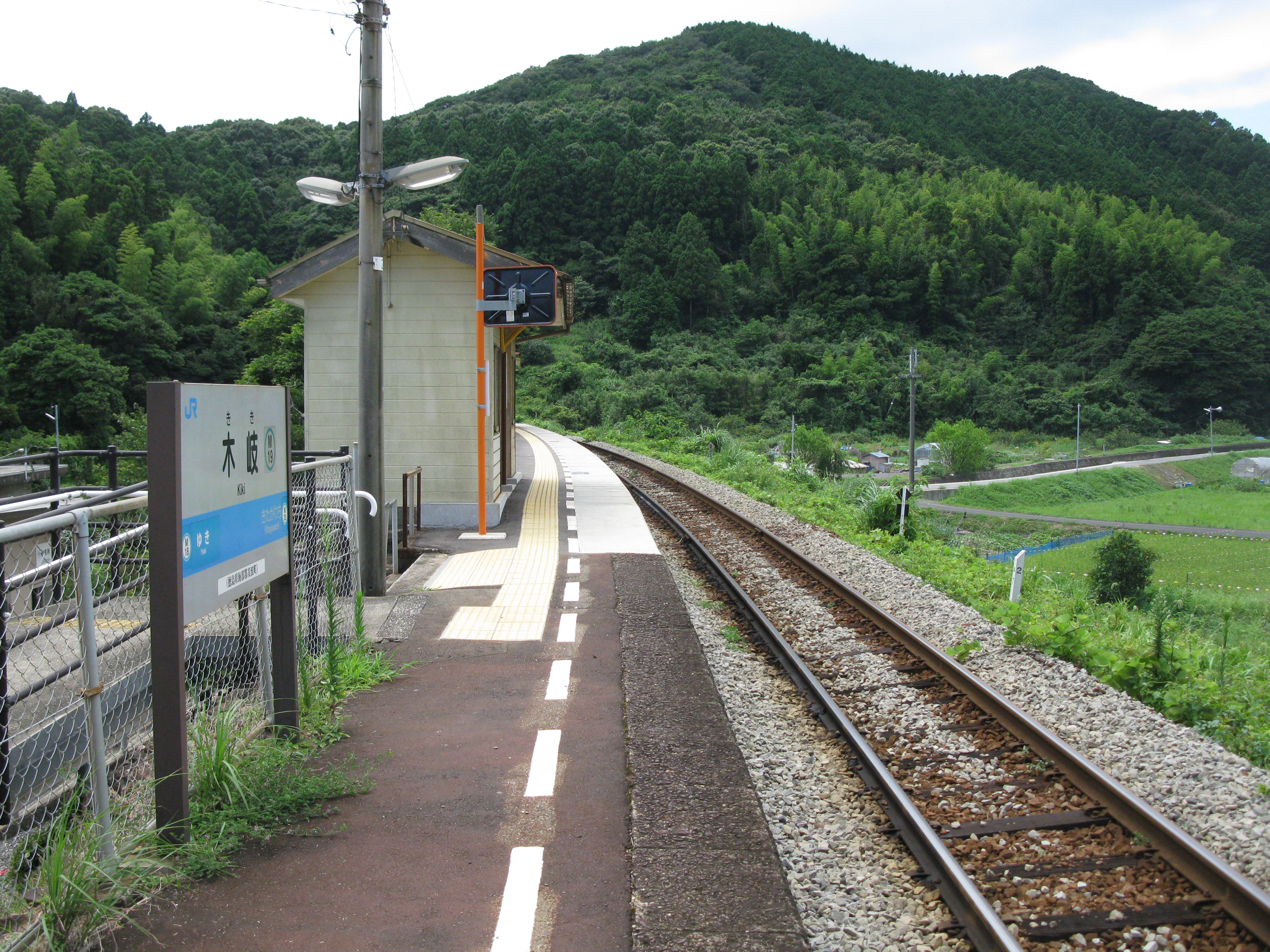
- Kiki Station in August 2010

General information
- Location: Kiki, Minami-cho, Kaifu-gun, Tokushima-ken 779-2108; Japan
- Coordinates: 33.7665°N 134.5695°E
- Operator: JR Shikoku
- Line: ■ Mugi Line
- Distance: 47.2 km from Tokushima
- Platforms: 1 side platform
- Tracks: 1

Construction
- Structure type: Embankment
- Accessible: Yes - ramp leads up to platform

Other information
- Status: Unstaffed
- Station code: M19

History
- Opened: 14 December 1939

Passengers
- FY2019: 40
Location
- Location within Tokushima Prefecture Location within Japan

Kiki Station (木岐駅, Kiki-eki) is a passenger railway station located in the town of Minami, Kaifu District, Tokushima Prefecture, Japan. It is operated by JR Shikoku and has the station number "M19".

== Lines ==
Kiki Station is served by the Mugi Line and is located 47.2 km from the beginning of the line at Tokushima. All trains stop at this station.

== Layout ==
The station consists of one side platform serving a single track on an embankment. There is no station building, only a shelter on the platform for passengers. A ramp and a flight of steps lead up to the platform from the access road. Near the base of the ramp is a disused shelter that once housed a ticket window.

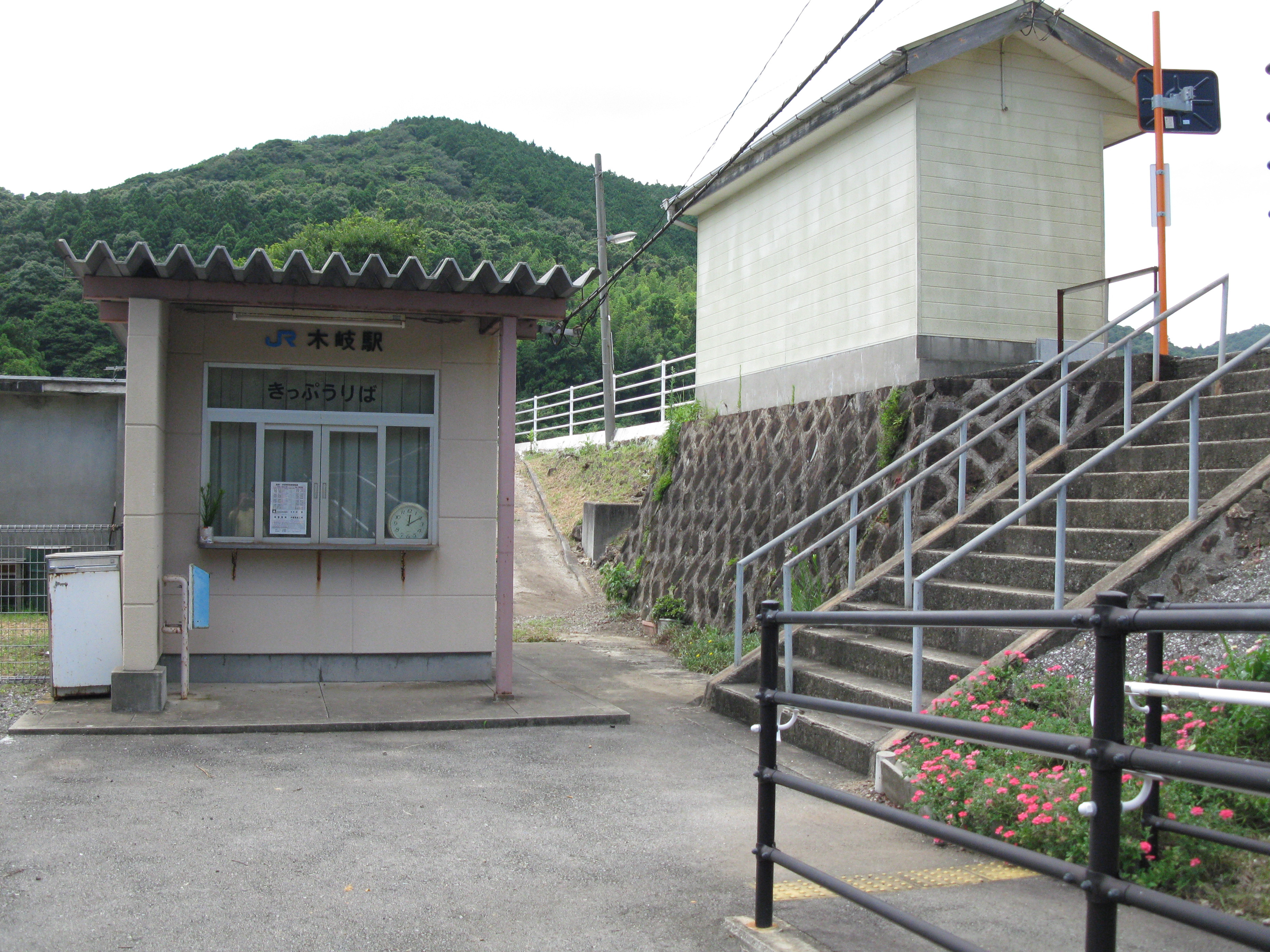
The disused ticket window shelter at the base of the embankment. In the foreground can be seen the ramp leading to the platform.

== Adjacent stations ==
| « | Service | » |
Mugi Line
| Tainohama (if open); Yuki (otherwise) | Local | Kitagawachi |

== History ==
Japanese Government Railways (JGR) opened Kiki Station on 14 December 1939 as an intermediate station when the track of the Mugi Line was extended from Awa-Fukui to Hiwasa. On 1 April 1987, with the privatization of Japanese National Railways (JNR), the successor of JGR, JR Shikoku took over control of the station.

== Surrounding area ==
Kiki is a settlement centered on the fishing industry, and private houses are gathered on the narrow flat land at the mouth of the Kiki River.

- Kiki Fisheries Cooperative
- Minami Municipal Kiki Elementary School
- Minami Municipal Kiki Public Hall

== See also ==
- List of railway stations in Japan
