= Yuki Station (Tokushima) =

Railway station in Minami, Tokushima Prefecture, Japan

M18 Yuki Station 由岐駅
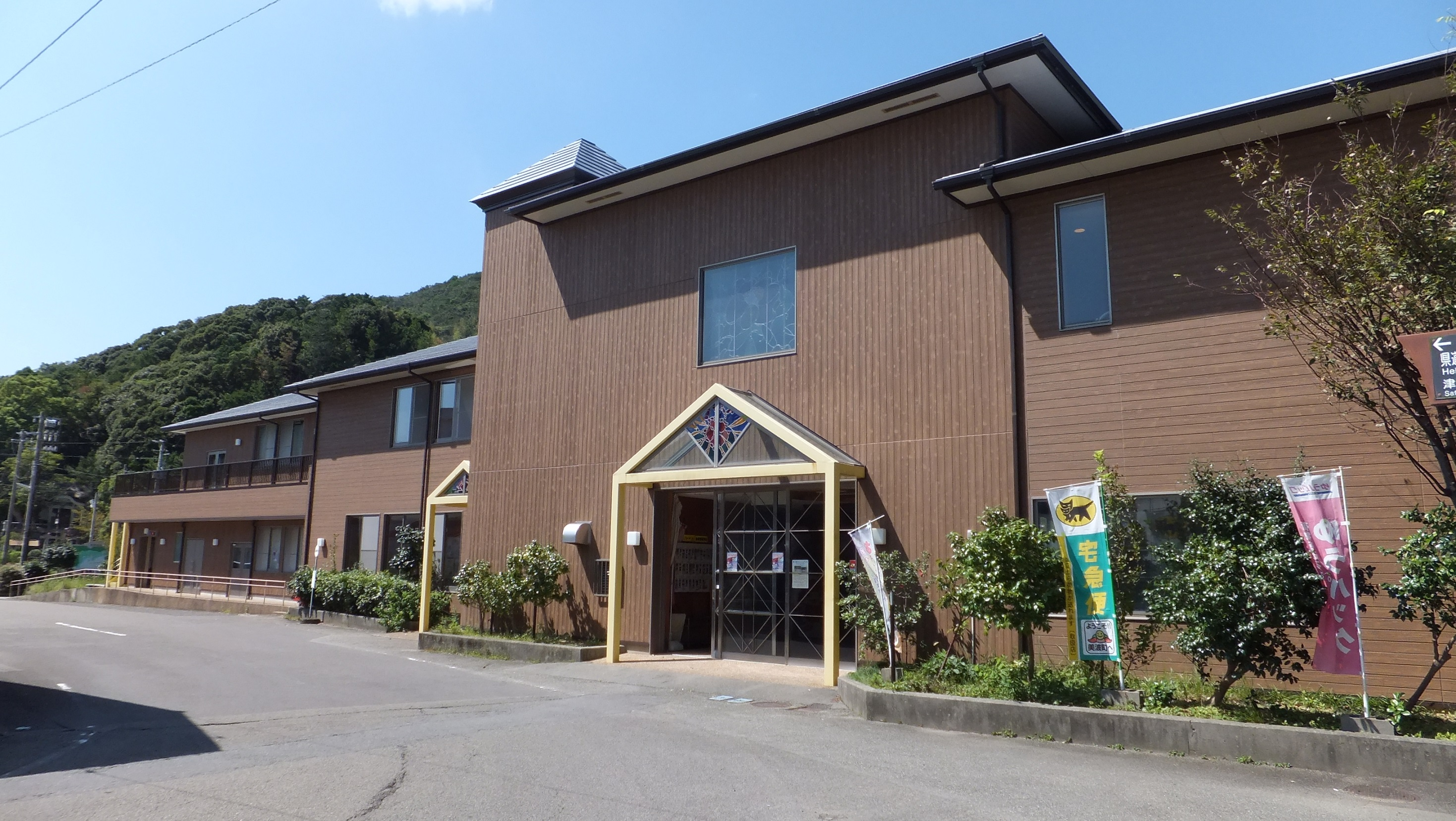
- Yuki Station in September 2015

General information
- Location: Minami-cho, Kaifu-gun, Tokushima-ken 779-2103
- Coordinates: 33.7762°N 134.5918°E
- Operator: JR Shikoku
- Line: ■ Mugi Line
- Distance: 44.9 km from Tokushima
- Platforms: 2 side platforms
- Tracks: 2 + 1 siding

Construction
- Structure type: At grade
- Accessible: Yes - platforms linked by ramps and level crossing

Other information
- Status: Unstaffed but some types of tickets sold by a kan'i itaku agent onsite
- Station code: M18

History
- Opened: 14 December 1939

Passengers
- FY2019: 176
Location
- Location within Tokushima Prefecture Location within Japan

Yuki Station (由岐駅, Yuki-eki) is a passenger railway station located in the town of Minami, Kaifu District, Tokushima Prefecture, Japan. It is operated by JR Shikoku and has the station number "M18".

== Lines ==
Yuki Station is served by the Mugi Line and is located 44.9 km from the beginning of the line at Tokushima. As of the Muroto limited express' discontinuation in March 2025, only local trains service the line. As a result, all trains stop at this station.

== Layout ==
The station consists of two opposed side platforms serving two tracks, with a siding branching off track 1. The station premises occupy only a part of a large building which incorporates other facilities such as an aquarium/museum set up by the municipal authorities. The station ticket window has been unstaffed since 2010 but some types of tickets are sold by the museum, acting as a kan'i itaku agent. Access to the opposite platform is by means of a level crossing with ramps at both ends.

=== Platforms ===
| 1 | ■ Mugi Line | for Mugi Awa-Kainan |
| 2 | ■ Mugi Line | for Anan and Tokushima |

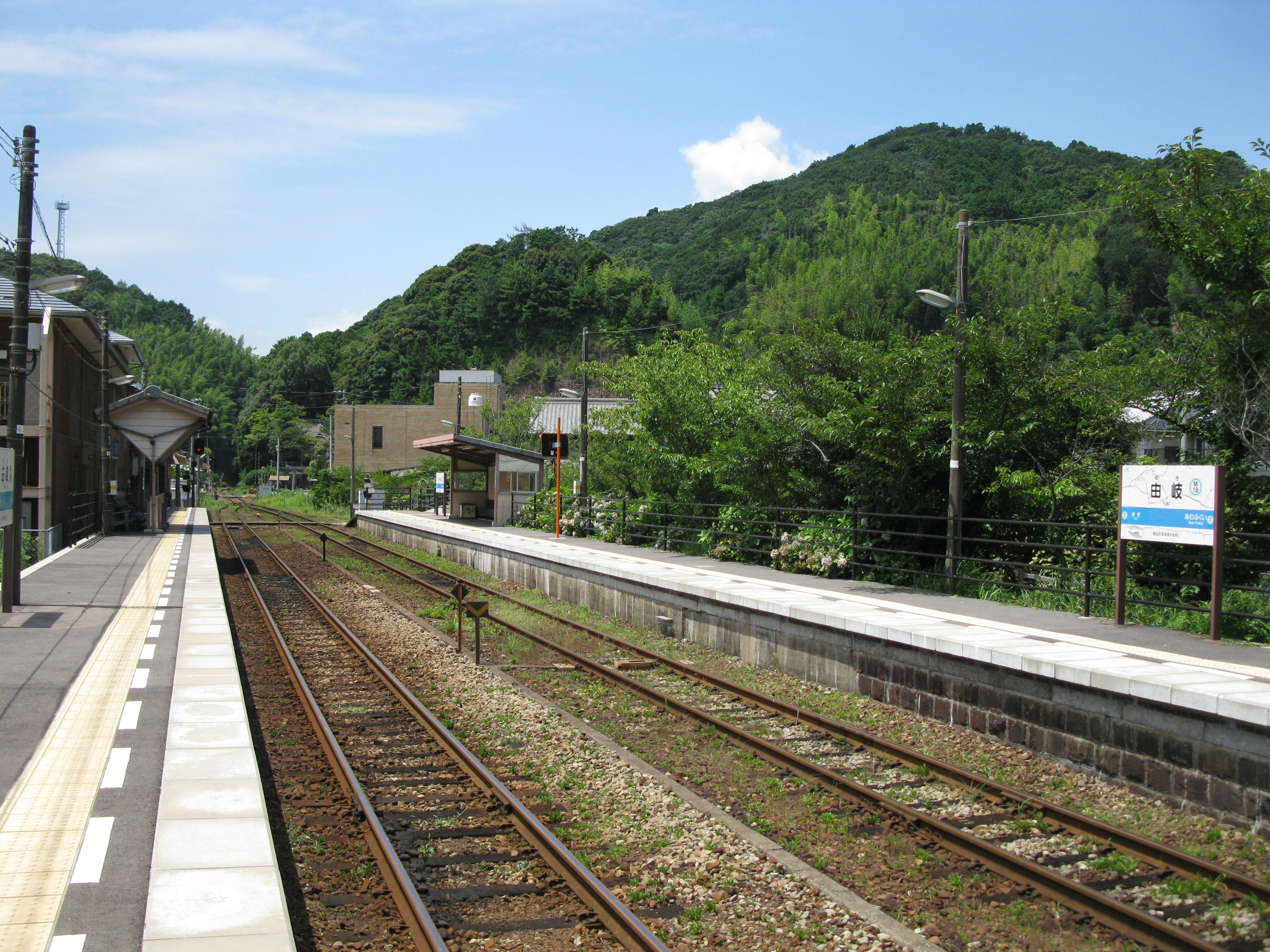
A view of the station platforms and tracks looking in the direction of Mugi. The level crossing can be seen in the distance.

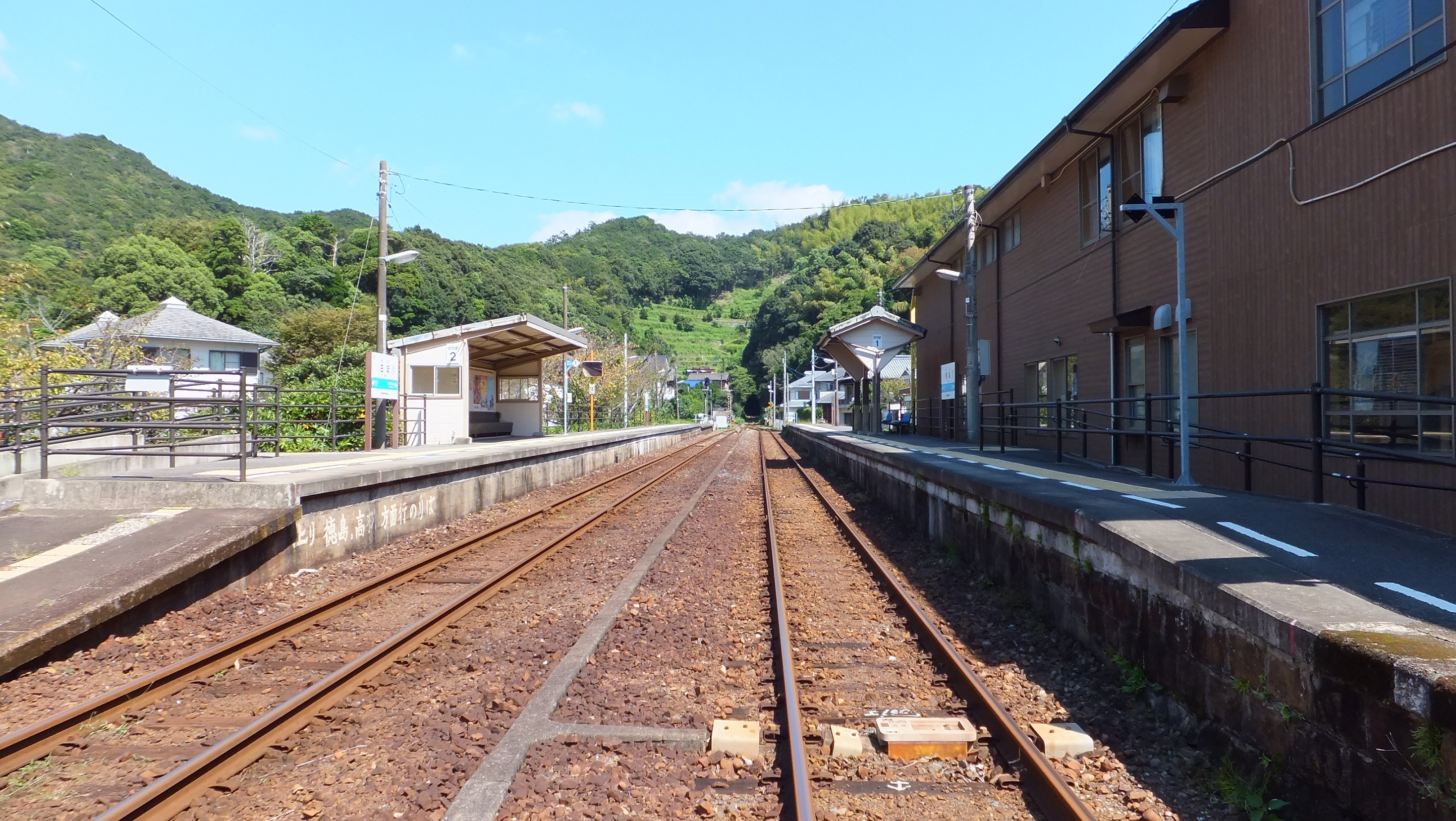
A view of the station platforms and tracks looking in the direction of Tokushima. The siding branching off track 1 can be seen in the distance.

== Adjacent stations ==
| « | Service | » |
Mugi Line
| Awa-Fukui | Local | Tainohama (if open); Kiki (otherwise) |

== History ==
Japanese Government Railways (JGR) opened Yuki Station on 14 December 1939 as an intermediate station when the track of the Mugi Line was extended from Awa-Fukui to Hiwasa. On 1 April 1987, with the privatization of Japanese National Railways (JNR), the successor of JGR, JR Shikoku took over control of the station.

== Passenger statistics ==
In fiscal 2019, the station was used by an average of 176 passengers daily.

== Surrounding area ==
- Poppo Marine (ぽっぽマリン, Poppo-marin) - An aquarium and other facilities set up by Minami town authorities and housed in the same building as the station. There is also a tourist information centre, an exhibition hall for local products, a shop for the sale of local produce and a food outlet where local foodstuffs can be sampled.
- Minami Town National Health Insurance Minami Hospital
- Minami Town Yuki Branch
- Minami Municipal Yuki Elementary School
- Minami Municipal Yuki Junior High School

== See also ==
- List of railway stations in Japan
