= Kitagawachi Station =

Railway station in Minami, Tokushima Prefecture, Japan

M20 Kitagawachi Station 北河内駅
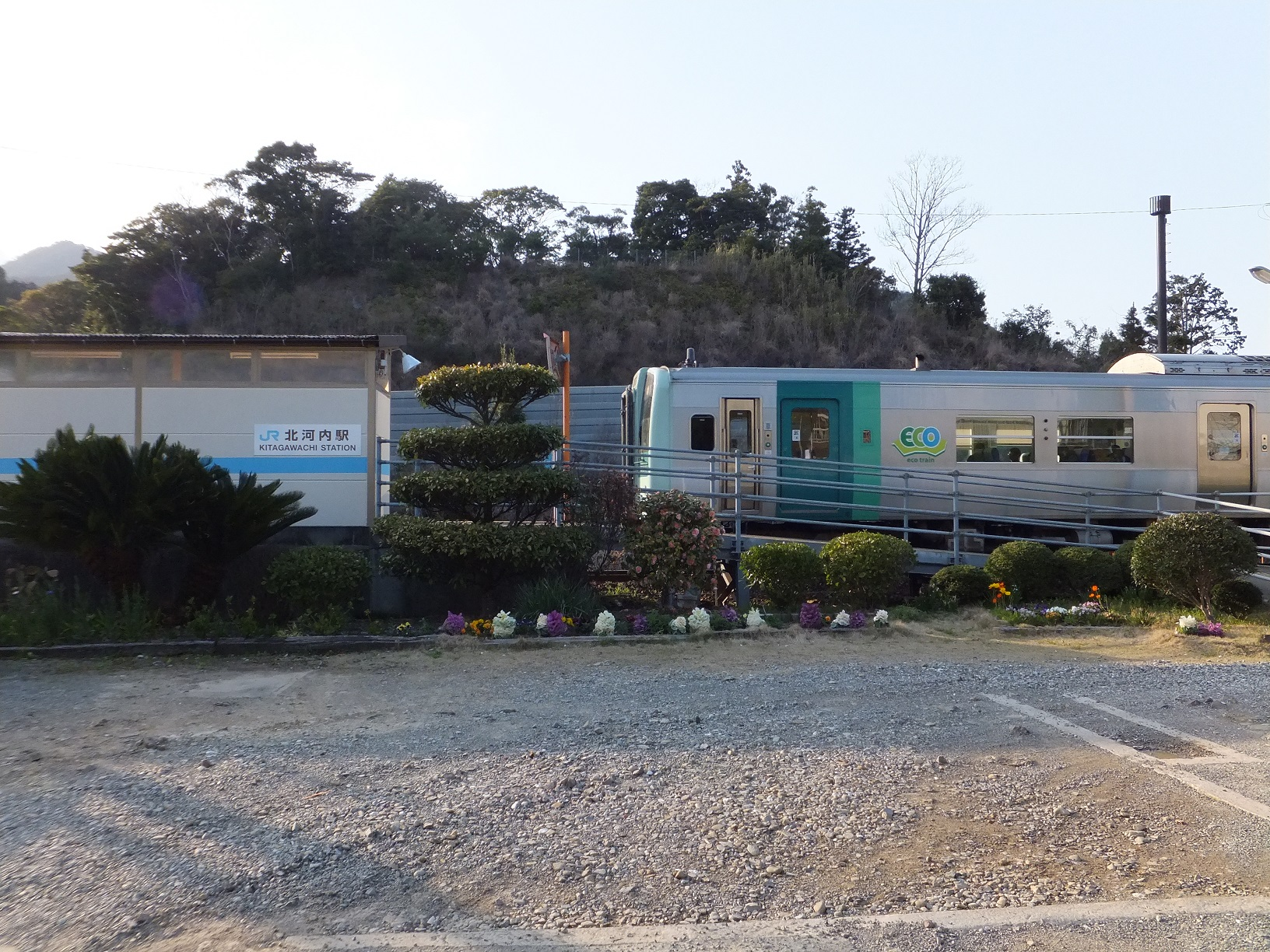
- Kitagawachi Station in April 2012

General information
- Location: Kitagawauchi, Minami-cho, Kaifu-gun, Tokushima-ken 779-2302; Japan
- Coordinates: 33.7433°N 134.535°E
- Operator: JR Shikoku
- Line: ■ Mugi Line
- Distance: 51.5 km from Tokushima
- Platforms: 1 side platform
- Tracks: 1

Construction
- Structure type: At grade
- Parking: Available
- Cycle facilities: Bike shed
- Accessible: Yes - ramp leads up to platform

Other information
- Status: Unstaffed
- Station code: M20

History
- Opened: 14 December 1939

Passengers
- FY2019: 62
Location
- Location within Tokushima Prefecture Location within Japan

Kitagawachi Station (北河内駅, Kitagawachi-eki) is a passenger railway station located in the town of Minami, Kaifu District, Tokushima Prefecture, Japan. It is operated by JR Shikoku and has the station number "M20".

== Lines ==
Kitagawachi Station is served by the Mugi Line and is located 51.5 km from the beginning of the line at Tokushima. All trains stop at this station.

== Layout ==
The station consists of one side platform serving a single track. There is no station building; however, the platform has a shelter for passengers. A ramp and a flight of steps lead up to the platform from the access road. A bike shed is located near the entrance of the station.

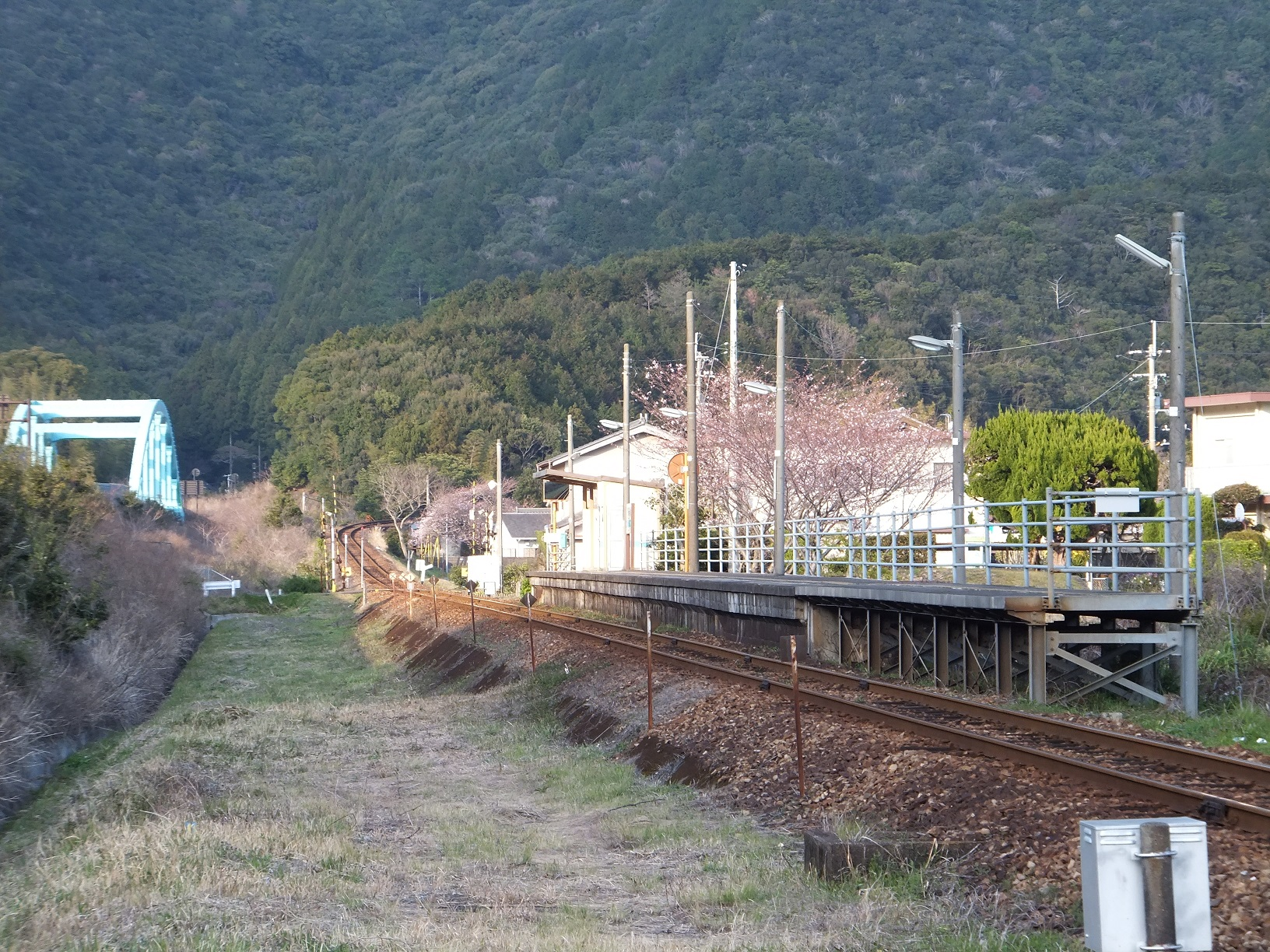
Platform and track of Kitagawachi Station.

== Adjacent stations ==
«	Service	»
Mugi Line
Kiki	Local	Hiwasa

== History ==
Japanese Government Railways (JGR) opened Kitagawachi Station on 14 December 1939 with the name Akagawachi (赤河内, Akagawachi). It was set up as intermediate station when the track of the Mugi Line was being extended from Awa-Fukui to Hiwasa. The station was renamed Kitagawachi on 1 October 1959. On 1 April 1987, with the privatization of Japanese National Railways (JNR), the successor of JGR, JR Shikoku took over control of the station.

== Surrounding area ==
- Japan National Route 55
- Minami Municipal Hiwasa Junior High School

== See also ==
- List of railway stations in Japan
