= Yamagawachi Station =

Railway station in Minami, Tokushima Prefecture, Japan

M22 Yamagawachi Station 山河内駅
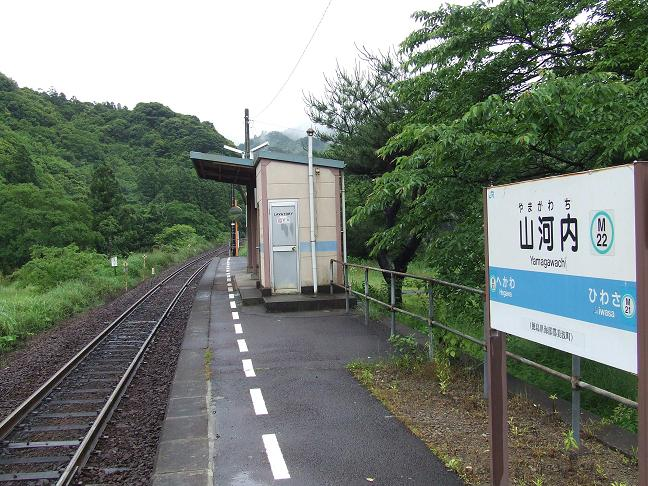
- Yamagawachi Station in May 2008

General information
- Location: Yamagawauchi, Minami-cho, Kaifu-gun, Tokushima-ken 779-2307
- Coordinates: 33.7152°N 134.4855°E
- Operator: JR Shikoku
- Line: ■ Mugi Line
- Distance: 58.4 km from Tokushima
- Platforms: 1 side platform
- Tracks: 1

Construction
- Structure type: At grade
- Cycle facilities: Bike shed
- Accessible: Yes - ramp leads up to platform

Other information
- Status: Unstaffed
- Station code: M22

History
- Opened: 1 July 1942

Passengers
- FY2019: 20
Location
- Location within Tokushima Prefecture Location within Japan

Yamagawachi Station (山河内駅, Yamagawachi-eki) is a passenger railway station located in the town of Minami, Kaifu District, Tokushima Prefecture, Japan. It is operated by JR Shikoku and has the station number "M22".

== Lines ==
Yamagawachi Station is served by the Mugi Line and is located 58.4 km from the beginning of the line at Tokushima. All trains stop at this station.

== Layout ==
The station consists of one side platform serving a single track. There is no station building, only a shelter on the platform for passengers. A flight of steps lead up to the platform from the access road. A ramp has also been built up to the platform but the path from the access road to the base of the ramp is unpaved.

== Adjacent stations ==
«	Service	»
Mugi Line
Hiwasa	Local	Hegawa

== History ==
Japanese Government Railways (JGR) opened the station on 1 July 1942 as an intermediate station when the track of the Mugi Line was extended from Hiwasa to Mugi. On 1 April 1987, with the privatization of Japanese National Railways (JNR), the successor of JGR, JR Shikoku took over control of the station.

== Surrounding area ==
- Mugi Town Hall
- Tokushima Prefectural Kaifu Hospital

== See also ==
- List of railway stations in Japan
