= Hegawa Station =

Railway station in Mugi, Tokushima Prefecture, Japan

M23 Hegawa Station 辺川駅
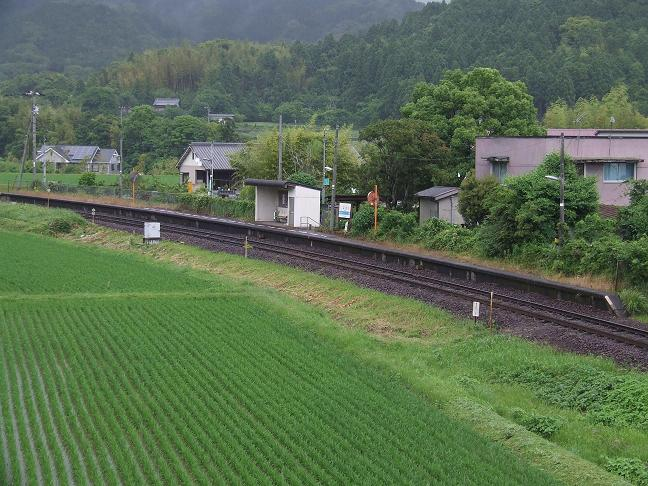
- Hegawa station in May 2008

General information
- Location: Tachibana, Mugi-cho, Kaifu-gun, Tokushima-ken 775-0002; Japan
- Coordinates: 33.6946°N 134.4348°E
- Operator: JR Shikoku
- Line: ■ Mugi Line
- Distance: 64.3 km from Tokushima
- Platforms: 1 side platform
- Tracks: 1

Construction
- Structure type: At grade
- Cycle facilities: Bike shed
- Accessible: Yes - ramp leads up to platform

Other information
- Status: Unstaffed
- Station code: M23

History
- Opened: 1 July 1942

Passengers
- FY2019: 8
Location
- Location within Tokushima Prefecture Location within Japan

Hegawa Station (辺川駅, Hegawa-eki) is a passenger railway station located in the town of Mugi, Kaifu District, Tokushima Prefecture, Japan. It is operated by JR Shikoku and has the station number "M23".

== Lines ==
Hegawa Station is served by the Mugi Line and is located 64.3 km from the beginning of the line at Tokushima. All trains stop at this station.

== Layout ==
The station consists of one side platform serving a single track. There is no station building, only a shelter on the platform for passengers. A flight of steps and a ramp lead up to the platform from the access road.

== Adjacent stations ==
«	Service	»
Mugi Line
Yamagawachi	Local	Mugi

== History ==
Japanese Government Railways (JGR) opened Hegawa Station on 1 July 1942 as an intermediate station when the track of the Mugi Line was extended from Hiwasa to Mugi. On 1 April 1987, with the privatization of Japanese National Railways (JNR), the successor of JGR, JR Shikoku took over control of the station.

== Surrounding area ==
- Japan National Route 55

== See also ==
- List of railway stations in Japan
