= Sabase Station =

Railway station in Kaiyō, Tokushima Prefecture, Japan

M25 Sabase Station 鯖瀬駅
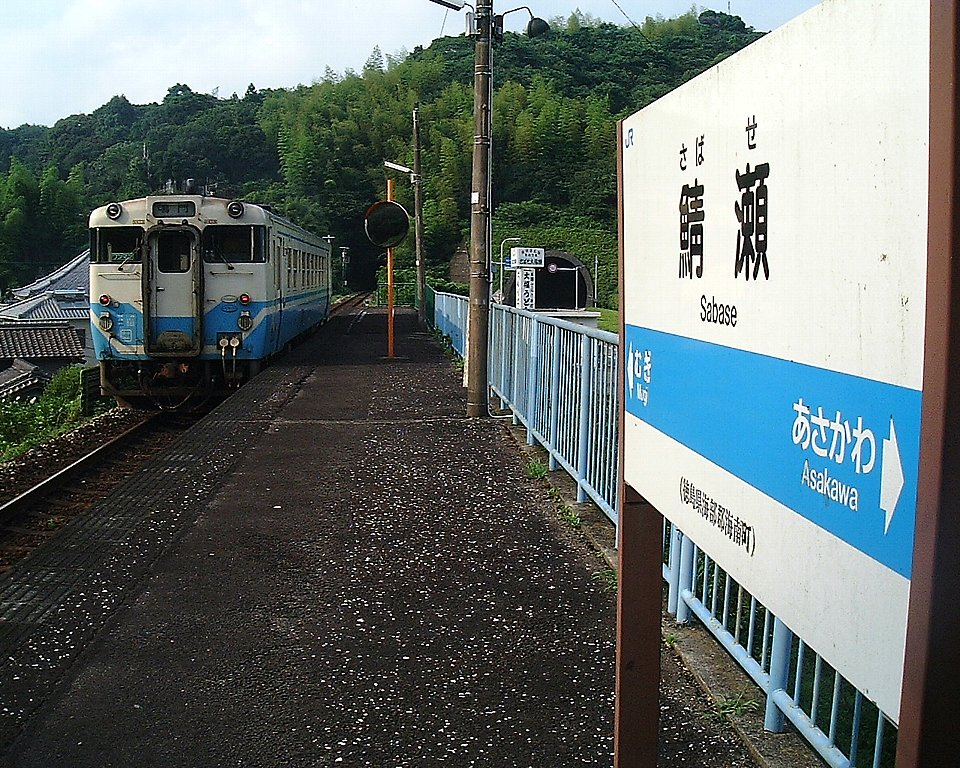
- Sabase Station, July 2002

General information
- Location: Asakawa, Kaiyō-cho, Kaifu-gun, Tokushima-ken 775-0101; Japan
- Coordinates: 33.6465°N 134.3851°E
- Operator: JR Shikoku
- Line: ■ Mugi Line
- Distance: 72.0 km from Tokushima
- Platforms: 1 side platform
- Tracks: 1

Construction
- Structure type: At grade
- Accessible: No -steep access road to platform

Other information
- Status: Unstaffed
- Station code: M25

History
- Opened: 1 October 1973

Passengers
- FY2019: 4
Location
- Location within Tokushima Prefecture Location within Japan

Sabase Station (鯖瀬駅, Sabase-eki) is a passenger railway station located in the town of Kaiyō, Kaifu District, Tokushima Prefecture, Japan. It is operated by JR Shikoku and has the station number "M25".

== Lines ==
Sabase Station is served by the Mugi Line and is located 72.0 km from the beginning of the line at Tokushima. All trains stop at this station.

== Layout ==
The station consists of a side platform serving a single track. There is no station building, only a shelter on the platform for passengers. The access road slopes up steeply from the main road, giving direct access to the platform.

== Adjacent stations ==
«	Service	»
Mugi Line
Mugi	Local	Asakawa

== History ==
Japanese National Railways (JNR) opened the station on 1 October 1973 as an intermediate station when the track of the Mugi Line was extended from Mugi to Kaifu. On 1 April 1987, with the privatization of JNR, control of the station passed to JR Shikoku.

== Passenger statistics ==
In fiscal 2019, the station was used by an average of 4 passengers daily.

== Surrounding area ==
- Japan National Route 55

== See also ==
- List of railway stations in Japan
