= Niken'ya Station =

Railway station in Tokushima, Japan

M02 Niken'ya Station 二軒屋駅
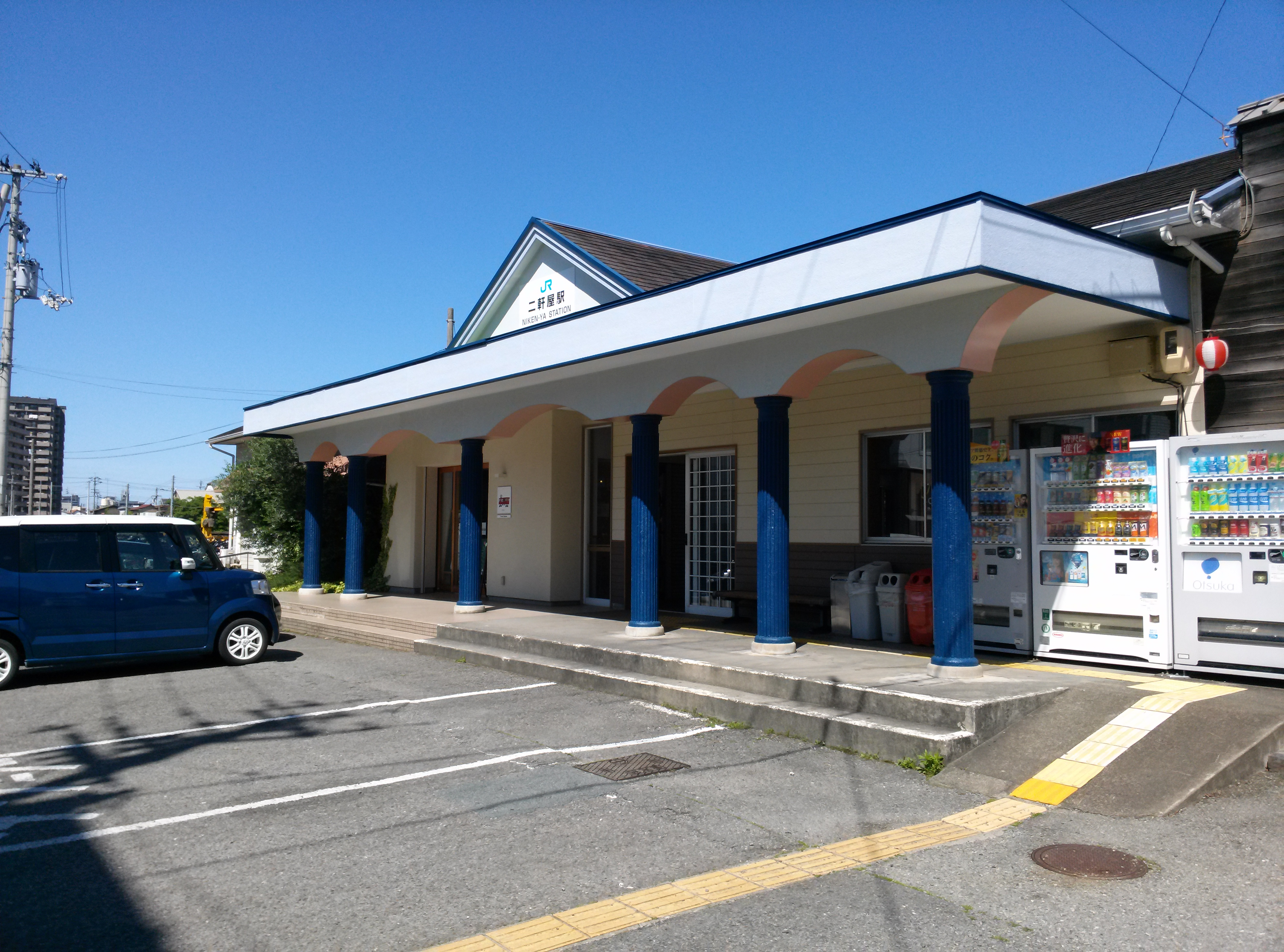
- Niken'ya Station in May 2016

General information
- Location: 1 Chome-1 Minaminikenyachō, Tokushima-shi, Tokushima-ken 770-8063; Japan
- Coordinates: 34.0549°N 134.5467°E
- Operator: JR Shikoku
- Line: ■ Mugi Line
- Distance: 2.8 km from Tokushima
- Platforms: 1 island platform
- Tracks: 2 + 1 passing loop

Construction
- Structure type: At grade
- Cycle facilities: Designated parking area for bicycles
- Accessible: Yes - island platform accessed by ramp and level crossing

Other information
- Status: Unstaffed
- Station code: M02

History
- Opened: 20 April 1913

Passengers
- FY2022: 613
Location
- Location within Tokushima Prefecture Location within Japan

Niken'ya Station (二軒屋駅, Niken'ya-eki) is a passenger railway station located in the city of Tokushima, Tokushima Prefecture, Japan. It is operated by JR Shikoku and has the station number "M02".

== Lines ==
Niken'ya is Station served by the Mugi Line and is located 2.8 km from the beginning of the line at Tokushima. All trains stop at this station.

== Layout ==
The station consists of an island platform serving two tracks. The station building is unstaffed and serves only as a waiting room. The island platform is accessed by a level crossing and ramp. A passing loop runs between track 1 and the station building.

=== Platforms ===
1	■ Mugi Line	for Tokushima and Takamatsu
2	■ Mugi Line	for Anan and Mugi

== Adjacent stations ==
«	Service	»
Mugi Line
Awa-Tomida	Local	Bunkanomori

== History ==
Niken'ya Station was opened on 20 April 1913 as an intermediate station on a stretch of track laid down by the Awa National Joint Steamship Company (阿波国共同汽船, Awa-koku kyōdō kisen). After the company was nationalized on 1 September 1917, Japanese Government Railways (JGR) took over control of the station and operated it as part of the Komatsushima Light Railway and later, the Komatsushima Line. With the privatization of Japanese National Railways (JNR), the successor of JGR, on 1 April 1987, JR Shikoku took over control of the station.

== Passenger statistics ==
In fiscal 2022, the station was used by an average of 613 passengers daily.

== Surrounding area ==
- Tokushima City Hall Hachiman Branch
- Hachiman Elementary School, Tokushima City
- Tokushima City Hachiman Junior High School
- Tokushima Prefectural Jonan High School
- Tokushima Prefectural Tokushima Visual Support School, Tokushima

== See also ==
- List of railway stations in Japan
