= Mugi Line =

Railway line in Tokushima Prefecture, Japan

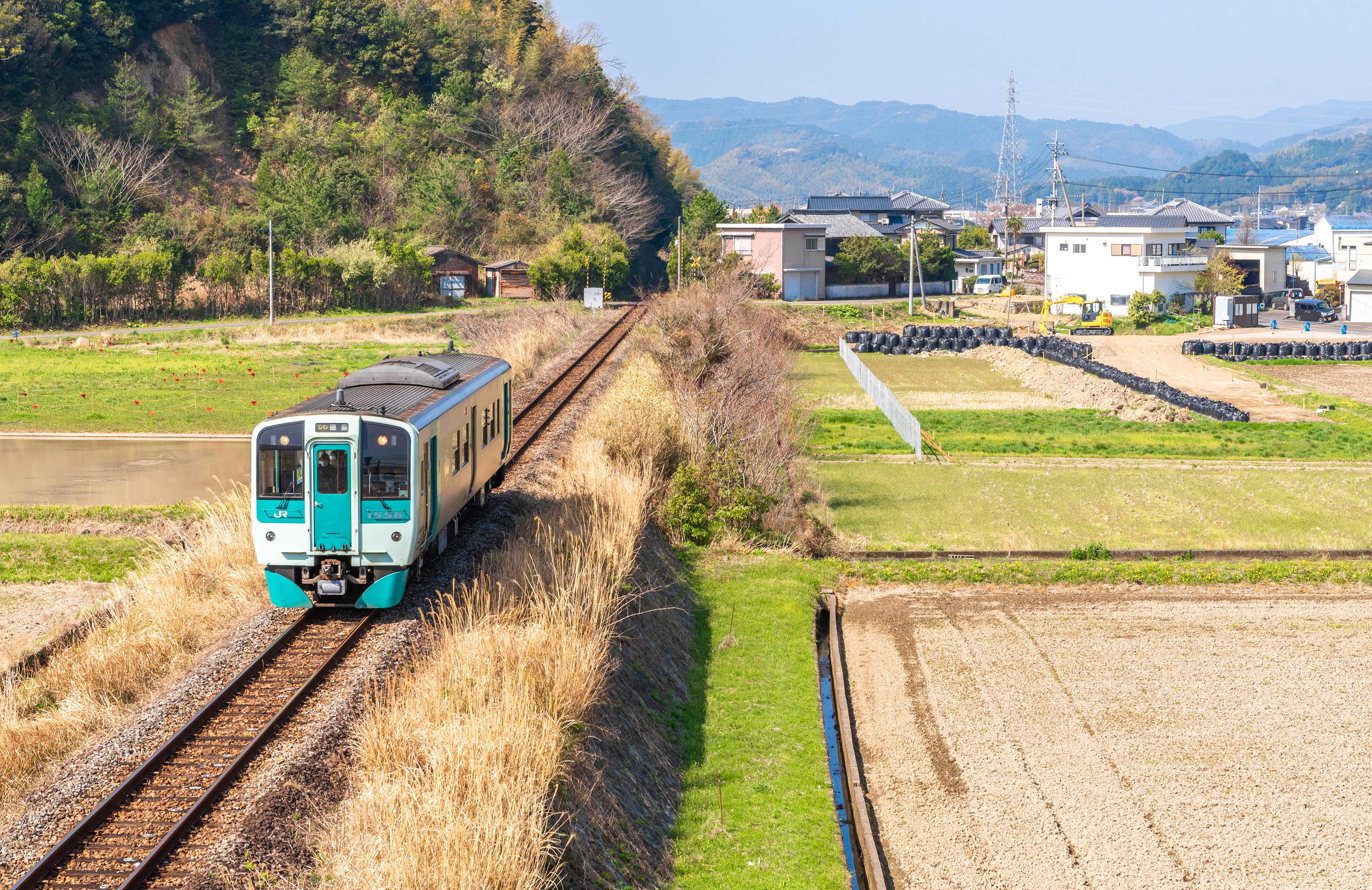
- Local train servicing Mugi Line

Overview
- Status: In operation
- Owner: JR Shikoku
- Locale: Tokushima Prefecture
- Termini: Tokushima; Awa-Kainan
- Stations: 29

Service
- Type: Heavy rail
- Operator(s): JR Shikoku
- Rolling stock: KiHa 185 series DMU; KiHa 40 series DMU; JR Shikoku 1000 series DMU; JR Shikoku 1200 series DMU; JR Shikoku 1500 series DMU

History
- Opened: 1913; 113 years ago

Technical
- Line length: 77.8 km (48.3 mi)
- Number of tracks: Entire line single tracked
- Character: Relatively rural
- Track gauge: 1,067 mm (3 ft 6 in)
- Electrification: None
- Operating speed: 110 km/h (68 mph)
Route map

The Mugi Line (牟岐線, Mugi-sen) is a railway line in southeastern Tokushima Prefecture, Japan, owned and operated by Shikoku Railway Company (JR Shikoku). It connects the prefectural capital of Tokushima with the town of Kaiyō in Kaifu District. The line's official nickname is "Awa-Muroto Seaside Line" (阿波室戸シーサイドライン, Awa-muroto-shiisaido-rain), but this is rarely used by local residents as it does not directly service Muroto, the intended destination of the line.

== History ==
The Awa Steamship Company, which operated a service between Honshu and Shikoku, first built an 11 km line from a port at Komatsushima to Tokushima which opened in 1913. In 1916, the line was extended by 10 km from Nakata to Furusho, resulting in the creation of the 2 km Komatsushima to Nakata branch line. The lines were nationalised the following year. In 1936, the line was extended south from Hanoura 17 km to Kumano, and the 2 km Hanoura to Furusho section became a freight-only branch, which closed in 1961. The line was extended a further 35 km to Mugi in three stages opening between 1937 and 1942.

In 1959, it was decided to extend the line to Muroto, where it would connect with the planned extension of the Asa line from Kochi. The first 12 km section to Kaifu opened in 1973, and further construction undertaken until work was suspended in 1980. The Chūden to Komatsushima branch closed in 1985.

In 1987, with the privatization of JNR, the line became part of the Shikoku Railway Company (JR Shikoku).

In 1988 construction work south of Kaifu was recommenced by a private company underwritten by the Tokushima Prefectural Government, and the next section opened in 1992 as the Asa Kaigan Railway Asato Line.

== Services ==
Although there are local trains that run the entire length of the Mugi Line, most services are divided at Mugi. There are trains that serve the Tokushima – Mugi, Tokushima – Awa-Kainan, and Mugi – Awa-Kainan sections, as well as a single round-trip between Tokushima and Anan. Some local trains have through service onto the Kōtoku, Tokushima, and Naruto lines. Driver-only operation is in effect for most daytime trains when there are few passengers.

Over the New Year's holiday, the seasonal Yakuōji-gō limited express provides service to/from Takamatsu.

Between 1962 and 2025, the Mugi Line was serviced by the Muroto, a limited express service which ran between Tokushima Mugi, continuing into Awa-Kainan as a local service, operating one round trip per day. It was discontinued in March 2025.

Until 2019, the Home Express Anan ran between Tokushima and Anan along the Mugi Line, a service which began in 2006. Likewise, prior to this time, some Muroto trains (and all Tsurugisan services) provided through service on the Tokushima and Dosan lines to/from Awa-Ikeda.

== Station list ==
- All stations are located in Tokushima Prefecture.
- Local trains stop at all stations.
- Trains can pass one another at stations marked "◇" and cannot pass at those marked "｜".

No.	Picture	Station	Japanese	Distance (km)		Transfers		Location
No.	Picture	Station	Japanese	Between stations	Total	Transfers		Location
M00		Tokushima	徳島	-	0.0	Kōtoku Line (T00), Tokushima Line*, Naruto Line*	◇	Tokushima
M01		Awa-Tomida	阿波富田	1.4	1.4		｜	Tokushima
M02		Niken'ya	二軒屋	1.4	2.8		◇	Tokushima
M03		Bunkanomori	文化の森	1.1	3.9		｜	Tokushima
M04		Jizōbashi	地蔵橋	2.1	6.0		｜	Tokushima
M05		Chūden	中田	3.2	9.2		◇	Komatsushima
M06		Minami-Komatsushima	南小松島	1.7	10.9		◇	Komatsushima
M07		Awa-Akaishi	阿波赤石	3.3	14.2		｜	Komatsushima
M08		Tatsue	立江	1.4	15.6		◇	Komatsushima
M09		Hanoura	羽ノ浦	2.1	17.7		◇	Anan
M10		Nishibara	西原	2.1	19.8		｜	Anan
M11		Awa-Nakashima	阿波中島	2.0	21.8		｜	Anan
M12		Anan	阿南	2.7	24.5		◇	Anan
M13		Minobayashi	見能林	1.9	26.4		｜	Anan
M14		Awa-Tachibana	阿波橘	2.2	28.6		｜	Anan
M15		Kuwano	桑野	4.0	32.6		◇	Anan
M16		Aratano	新野	3.6	36.2		｜	Anan
M17		Awa-Fukui	阿波福井	2.7	38.9		｜	Anan
M18		Yuki	由岐	6.0	44.9		◇	Minami, Kaifu District
M18-1		Tainohama	田井ノ浜	-	45.7	Seasonal station	｜	Minami, Kaifu District
M19		Kiki	木岐	2.3	47.2		｜	Minami, Kaifu District
M20		Kitagawachi	北河内	4.3	51.5		｜	Minami, Kaifu District
M21		Hiwasa	日和佐	1.8	53.3		◇	Minami, Kaifu District
M22		Yamagawachi	山河内	5.1	58.4		｜	Minami, Kaifu District
M23		Hegawa	辺川	5.9	64.3		｜	Mugi, Kaifu District
M24		Mugi	牟岐	3.4	67.7		◇	Mugi, Kaifu District
M25		Sabase	鯖瀬	4.3	72.0		｜	Kaiyō, Kaifu District
M26		Asakawa	浅川	3.4	75.4		｜	Kaiyō, Kaifu District
M27		Awa-Kainan	阿波海南	2.4	77.8	Asa Coast Railway Asatō Line (AS27)	｜	Kaiyō, Kaifu District

== See also ==
- List of railway lines in Japan
