= Jizōbashi Station =

Railway station in Tokushima, Japan

M04 Jizōbashi Station 地蔵橋駅
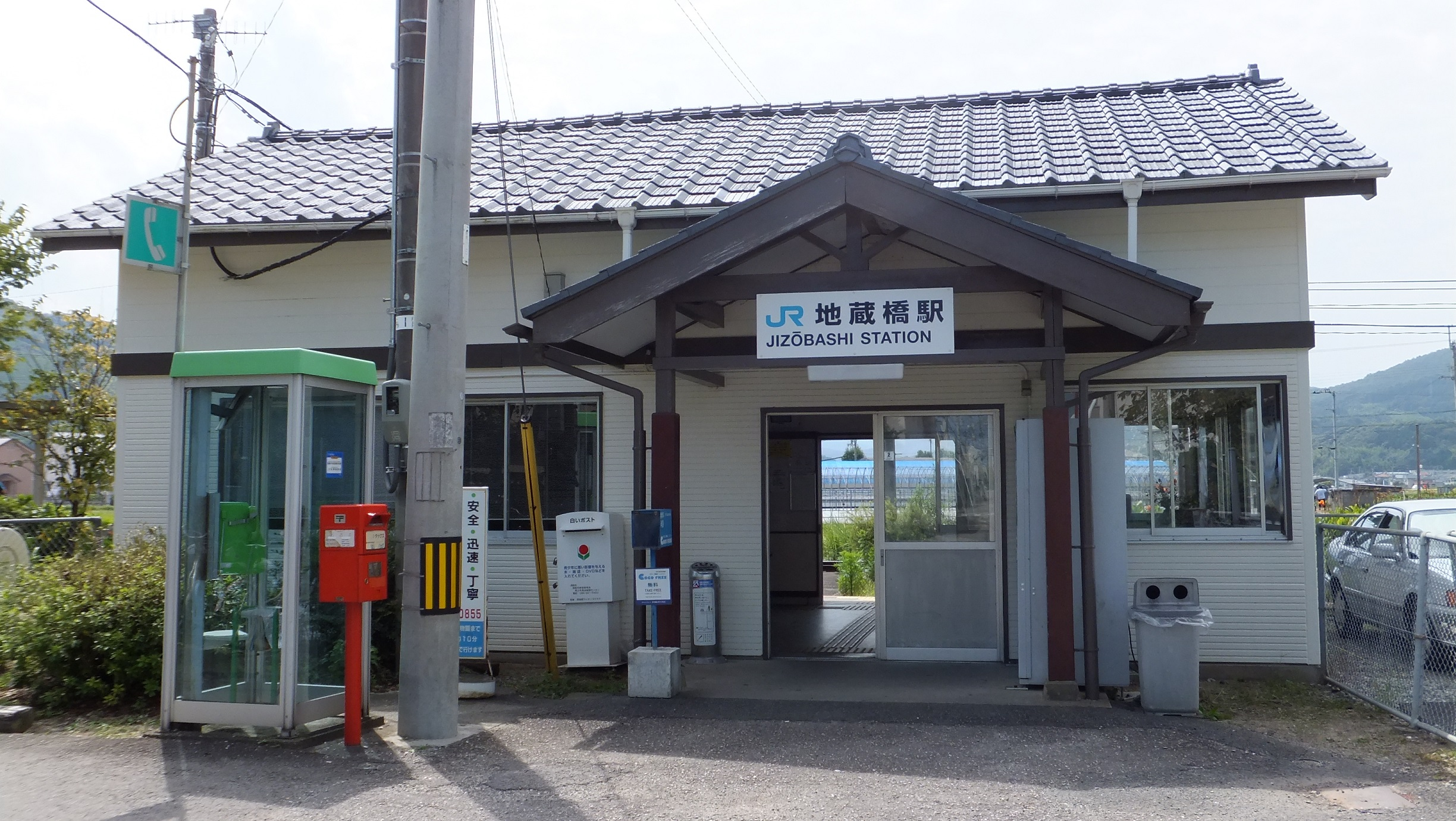
- Jizōbashi Station in September 2015

General information
- Location: Nishibari Nishizukachō, Tokushima-shi, Tokushima-ken 770-8024; Japan
- Coordinates: 34.0263°N 134.5474°E
- Operator: JR Shikoku
- Line: ■ Mugi Line
- Distance: 6.0 km from Tokushima
- Platforms: 1 side platform
- Tracks: 1

Construction
- Structure type: At grade
- Accessible: Yes - platform accessed by ramp

Other information
- Status: Unstaffed
- Station code: M04

History
- Opened: 20 April 1913

Passengers
- FY2022: 266
Location
- Location within Tokushima Prefecture Location within Japan

Jizōbashi Station (地蔵橋駅, Jizōbashi-eki) is a passenger railway station located in the city of Tokushima, Tokushima Prefecture, Japan. It is operated by JR Shikoku and has the station number "M04".

== Lines ==
Jizōbashi Station is served by the Mugi Line and is located 6.0 km from the beginning of the line at Tokushima. All trains stop at this station.

== Layout ==
The station consists of a side platform serving a single track. The station building is unstaffed and serves only as a waiting room. The present track was once track 2 of two tracks being served by an island platform. The trackbed of the now removed track 1 runs on the other side of the platform. A paved path from the station building crosses this old trackbed to a ramp which gives access to the platform.

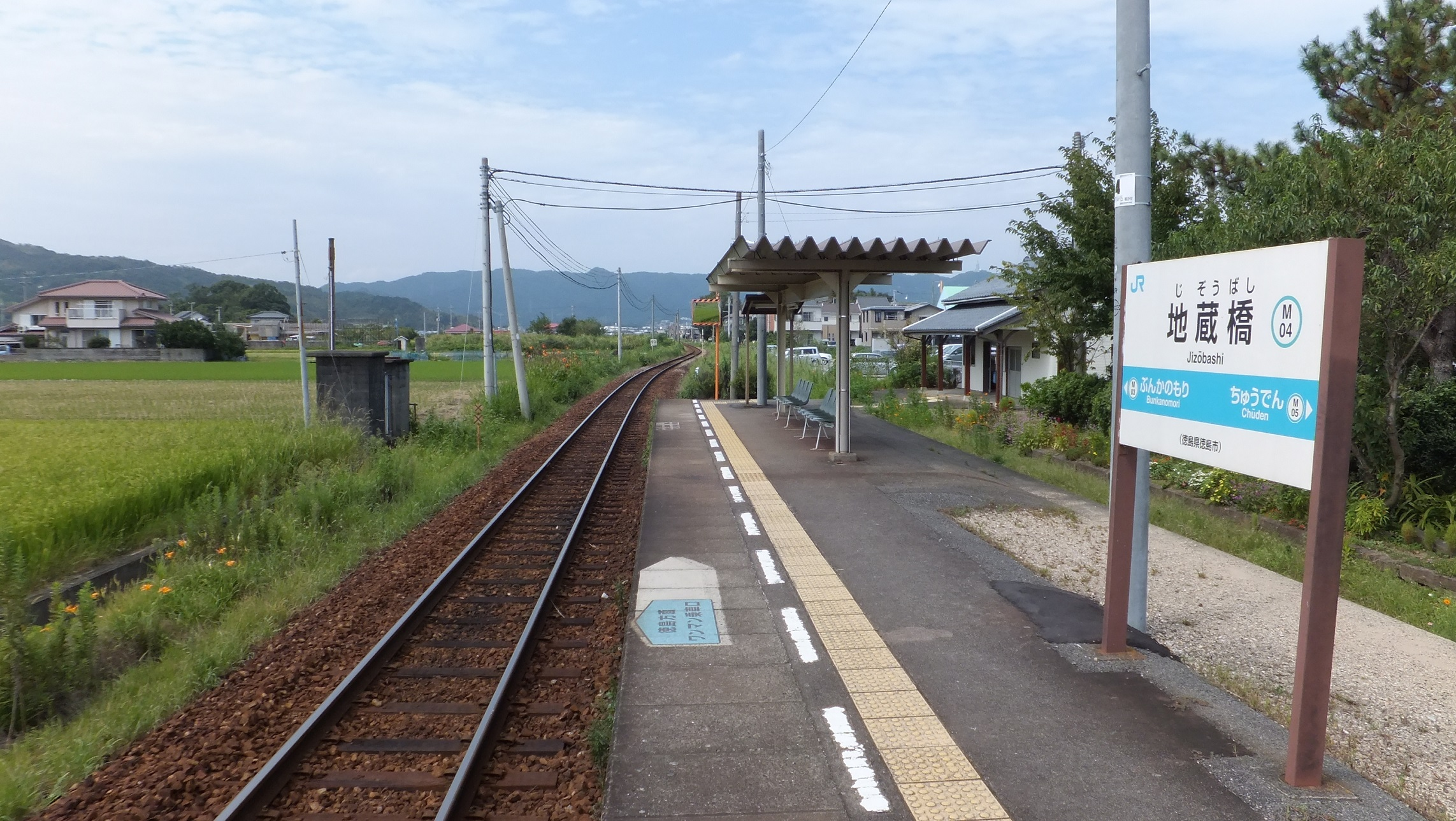
Platform and track of Jizōbashi Station. Note the trackbed of the former track 1 on the other side of the platform and the path from the station building which crosses it. The track kinks in the distance, indicating it once merged with the former track 1 over there.

== Adjacent stations ==
«	Service	»
Mugi Line
Bunkanomori	Local	Chūden

== History ==
Jizōbashi Station was opened on 20 April 1913 as an intermediate station on a stretch of track laid down by the Awa National Joint Steamship Company (阿波国共同汽船, Awa-koku kyōdō kisen) between Tokushima and the port at Komatsushima (where the rail facilities are now closed). After the company was nationalized on 1 September 1917, Japanese Government Railways (JGR) took over control of the station and operated it as part of the Komatsushima Light Railway and later, the Komatsushima Line. With the privatization of Japanese National Railways (JNR), the successor of JGR, on 1 April 1987, JR Shikoku took over control of the station.

== Passenger statistics ==
In fiscal 2022, the station was used by an average of 266 passengers daily.

== Surrounding area ==
- Tokushima City Hall Katsura Branch
- Hakuai Memorial Hospital

== See also ==
- List of railway stations in Japan
