= Minami, Tokushima =

Minami 美波町
- Town
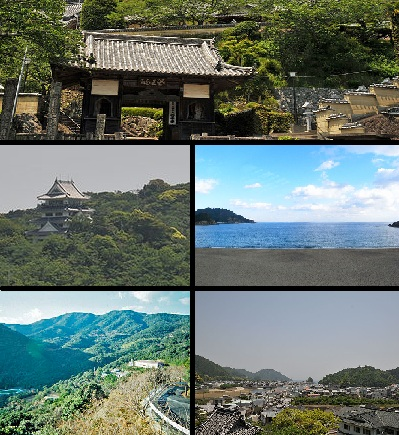
- Top:Yakuo Temple in Okukawachi, 2nd left:Hiwasa Castle, 2nd right:Ohama Beach, Bottom left:Panorama vies of Mount Myojin, from Izari area, Bottom right:Panorama view of Hiwasa area, from Yakuo Temple

- Flag Emblem
- Interactive map of Minami
- Location in Japan
- Coordinates: 33°44′05″N 134°32′08″E
- Country: Japan
- Region: Shikoku
- Prefecture: Tokushima
- District: Kaifu

Government
  - Mayor: Nobuyoshi Kageji (since August 2009)

Area
  - Total: 140.80 km^{2} (54.36 sq mi)

Population (June 30, 2022)
  - Total: 6,142
  - Density: 43.62/km^{2} (113.0/sq mi)
- Time zone: UTC+09:00 (JST)
- City hall address: 18-1 Honson, Okugawachi, Minami-cho, Kaifu-gun, Tokushima-ken 779-2305
- Climate: Cfa
- Website: Official website
- Symbols
- Bird: Delichon urbica
- Flower: Quercus phillyraeoldes
- Tree: Cherry blossom

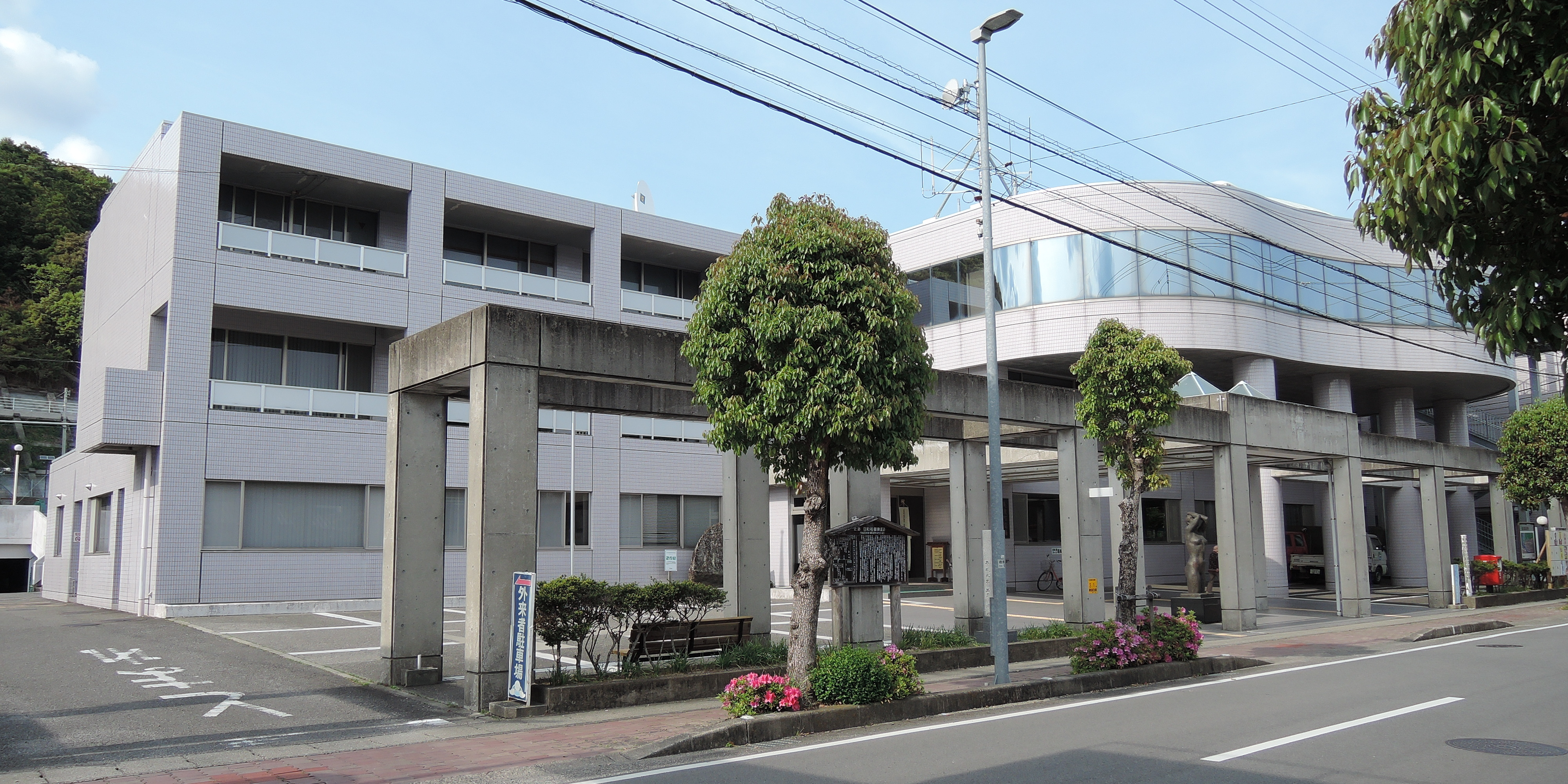
Minami Town Hall

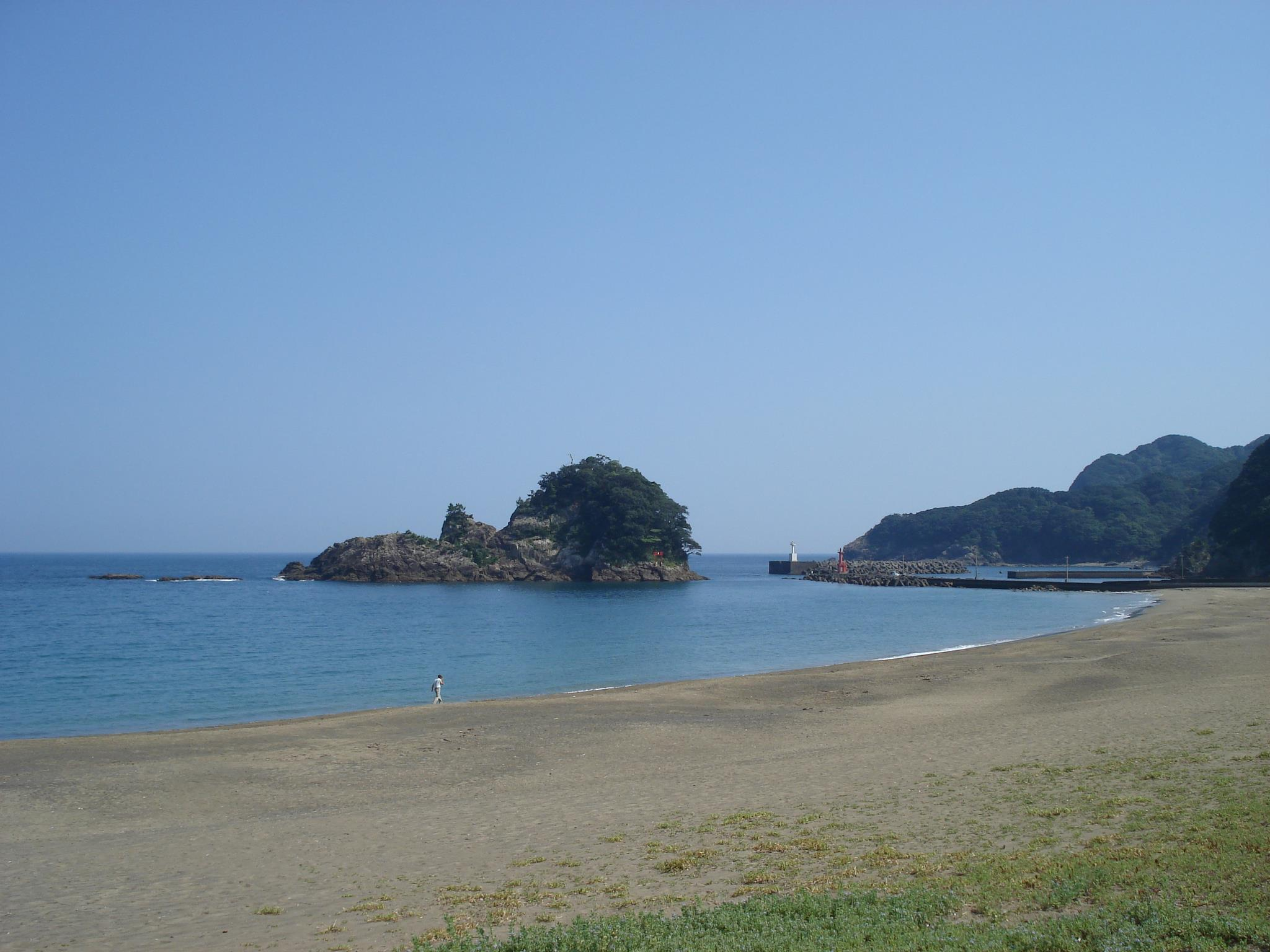
Ohama Beach

Minami (美波町, Minami-chō) is a town located in Kaifu District, Tokushima Prefecture, Japan. As of 30 June 2022, the town had an estimated population of 6,142 in 3139 households and a population density of 44 persons per km^{2}. The total area of the town is 140.80 square kilometres (54.36 sq mi).

== Geography ==
Minami is located in the southeastern part of Tokushima Prefecture on the island of Shikoku. Located 50 km south of prefecture's capital, Tokushima city, Minami is over 33 km from east to west, and covers an area of approximately 140 km^{2}. It is bordered on the southwest by the Kaifu mountains and on the east by the Pacific Ocean, making Minami a scenic town surrounded by mountains and sea. The Akamatsu and Hiwasa Rivers from the west to east, forming small-scale cultivated land and basins due to erosion plains and sedimentary plains. The mouth of the Hiwasa River is the most densely populated urban area, and also has a fishing port. Parts of the town are within the borders of the Muroto-Anan Kaigan Quasi-National Park.

=== Neighbouring municipalities ===
- Anan
- Kaiyō
- Mugi
- Naka

=== Climate ===
Minami has a humid subtropical climate (Köppen climate classification Cfa) with hot summers and cool winters. Precipitation is high, but there is a pronounced difference between the wetter summers and drier winters. The average annual temperature in Minami is 16.9 °C (62.4 °F). The average annual rainfall is 2,604.1 mm (102.52 in) with June as the wettest month. The temperatures are highest on average in August, at around 27.4 °C (81.3 °F), and lowest in January, at around 6.9 °C (44.4 °F). The highest temperature ever recorded in Minami was 38.8 °C (101.8 °F) on 2 August 2026; the coldest temperature ever recorded was −8.3 °C (17.1 °F) on 27 February 1981.

Climate data for Minami (1991−2020 normals, extremes 1976−present)
Month	Jan	Feb	Mar	Apr	May	Jun	Jul	Aug	Sep	Oct	Nov	Dec	Year
Record high °C (°F)	21.1 (70.0)	23.3 (73.9)	23.9 (75.0)	27.8 (82.0)	31.1 (88.0)	33.3 (91.9)	37.4 (99.3)	38.8 (101.8)	35.5 (95.9)	31.8 (89.2)	26.6 (79.9)	23.4 (74.1)	38.8 (101.8)
Mean daily maximum °C (°F)	12.0 (53.6)	12.6 (54.7)	15.5 (59.9)	20.1 (68.2)	24.0 (75.2)	26.5 (79.7)	30.2 (86.4)	32.0 (89.6)	29.2 (84.6)	24.4 (75.9)	19.3 (66.7)	14.4 (57.9)	21.7 (71.0)
Daily mean °C (°F)	6.9 (44.4)	7.5 (45.5)	10.5 (50.9)	15.1 (59.2)	19.2 (66.6)	22.4 (72.3)	26.1 (79.0)	27.4 (81.3)	24.7 (76.5)	19.8 (67.6)	14.4 (57.9)	9.3 (48.7)	16.9 (62.5)
Mean daily minimum °C (°F)	2.8 (37.0)	3.2 (37.8)	5.9 (42.6)	10.3 (50.5)	14.9 (58.8)	19.1 (66.4)	23.0 (73.4)	24.0 (75.2)	21.4 (70.5)	16.3 (61.3)	10.5 (50.9)	5.1 (41.2)	13.0 (55.5)
Record low °C (°F)	−4.9 (23.2)	−8.3 (17.1)	−4.0 (24.8)	0.7 (33.3)	4.3 (39.7)	10.5 (50.9)	15.6 (60.1)	17.7 (63.9)	12.9 (55.2)	5.5 (41.9)	−0.3 (31.5)	−4.1 (24.6)	−8.3 (17.1)
Average precipitation mm (inches)	79.7 (3.14)	110.8 (4.36)	186.0 (7.32)	227.2 (8.94)	248.7 (9.79)	340.8 (13.42)	307.0 (12.09)	255.7 (10.07)	337.6 (13.29)	254.8 (10.03)	151.4 (5.96)	104.4 (4.11)	2,604.1 (102.52)
Average precipitation days (≥ 1.0 mm)	5.4	6.7	10.2	10.0	10.6	14.1	12.3	10.1	12.2	9.1	6.8	5.3	112.8
Mean monthly sunshine hours	188.7	174.6	189.3	201.4	201.1	144.0	186.8	226.1	161.1	174.3	168.2	189.9	2,205.5
Source: Japan Meteorological Agency

=== Demographics ===
Per Japanese census data, the population of Minami in 2020 is 6,222 people. Minami has been conducting censuses since 1920.

Historical population
Year	Pop.	±%
1920	14,734	—
1925	13,886	−5.8%
1930	13,731	−1.1%
1935	14,204	+3.4%
1940	13,600	−4.3%
1945	17,480	+28.5%
1950	17,535	+0.3%
1955	16,884	−3.7%
1960	15,353	−9.1%
1965	14,047	−8.5%
1970	12,975	−7.6%
1975	12,337	−4.9%
1980	11,866	−3.8%
1985	11,262	−5.1%
1990	10,507	−6.7%
1995	9,928	−5.5%
2000	9,307	−6.3%
2005	8,726	−6.2%
2010	7,765	−11.0%
2015	7,092	−8.7%
2020	6,222	−12.3%
Minami population statistics

== History ==
As with all of Tokushima Prefecture, the area of Minami was part of ancient Awa Province. It was noted for ocean-borne shipping, especially of timber, from Tosa Province to the Kinai region. In 935, the author of Tosa Nikki, Ki no Tsurayuki stayed at Hiwasa port for four nights on his way back from Tosa to Kyoto. In 1223 Emperor Tsuchimikado, who had been exiled to Tosa due to the Jokyu War, was allowed to relocate to Yakuo-ji. During the Edo period, the area was part of the holdings of Tokushima Domain ruled by the Hachisuka clan from their seat at Tokushima Castle. In 1868, the Battle of Awa, a naval engagement of the Boshin War took place offshore Minami.

The village of Hiwasa was established within Kaifu District, Tokushima with the creation of the modern municipalities system on October 1, 1889. It was raised to town status on January 1, 1907. The 1946 Nankai earthquake caused great damage to the town. On March 31, 2006, Hiwasa merged with the neighboring town of Yuki to form the town of Minami.

== Government ==
Minami has a mayor-council form of government with a directly elected mayor and a unicameral town council of 12 members. Minami, together with the other municipalities of Kaifu District, contributes two members to the Tokushima Prefectural Assembly. In terms of national politics, the town is part of Tokushima 1st district of the lower house of the Diet of Japan.

== Economy ==
Minami has an economy based on agriculture and commercial fishing.

== Education ==
Minami has three public elementary schools and three public middle schools operated by the town government. The town does not have a high school; however the prefecture operates one special education school for the handicapped.

== Transportation ==
=== Railway ===
Shikoku Railway Company – Mugi Line

- Yuki - Tainohama - Kiki - Kitagawachi - Hiwasa - Yamagawachi

=== Highways ===
- National Route 55

== Sister cities ==
- Cairns, Queensland, Australia, sister city since 1969

== Local attractions ==
- Yakuō-ji, 23rd temple on the Shikoku Pilgrimage
- Ohama Beach
- Hiwasa Sea Turtle Museum

=== Festivals ===
- Hiwasa Hachiman Jinja Autumn Festival - A two-day harvest festival held one weekend early October every year. On the first day, the eight neighborhoods in Hiwasa parade their portable shrines through the streets of the town while praying for the safety of the townspeople and success in fishing. On the second day about 50 men from each neighborhood carry the portable shrine onto the beach and finally into the ocean, quite literally, proceeding through the waves to the far end of the beach. Each neighborhood vies with the others to put on the most spectacular display and also to prove their strength and bravery by taking their shrine furthest through the ocean waves. The heavy wooden portable shrines, known as chosa, each weigh about a tonne and four children ride atop the shrine drumming taiko drums. On the first evening of the festival there is a night bazaar with various refreshments and traditional dancing and taiko drumming, culminating in a spectacular fireworks display. Records of this festival go back to 1795, but the festival in its current form was started in 1957.

== In popular culture ==
In 2009/2010 Minami Town was one of the locations for NHK's TV drama 'Welkame' (ウェルかめ), which featured some of the towns beaches, its Autumn festival, and Minami's sea turtle museum. As a result, the town experienced an increase in domestic tourism.
