= Bunkanomori Station =

Railway station in Tokushima, Japan

M03 Bunkanomori Station 文化の森駅
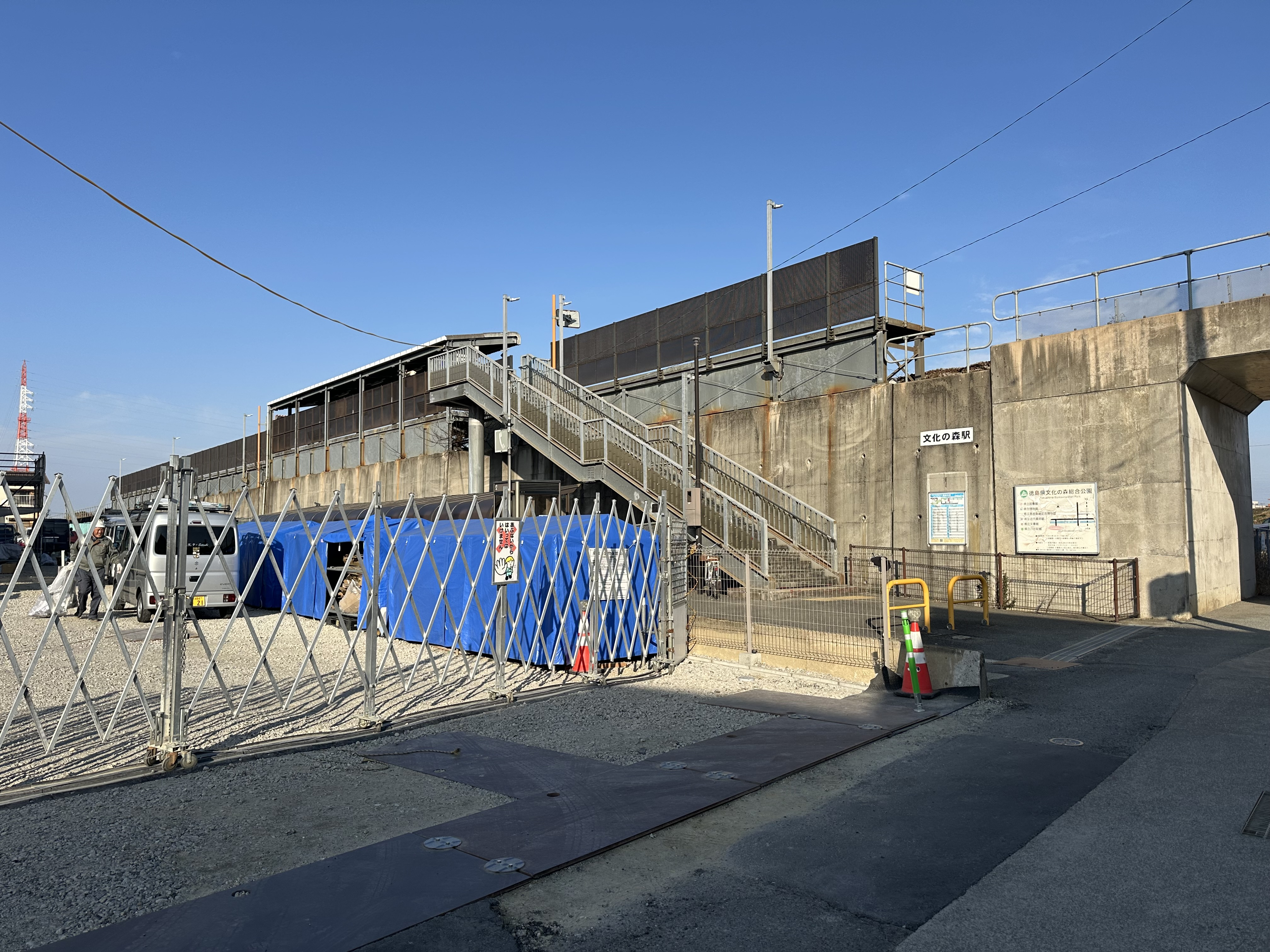
- Bunkanomori Station, February 2026

General information
- Location: Nijō Hachimanchō, Tokushima-shi, Tokushima-ken 770-8070; Japan
- Coordinates: 34.0443°N 134.5432°E
- Operator: JR Shikoku
- Line: ■ Mugi Line
- Distance: 3.9 km from Tokushima
- Platforms: 1 side platform
- Tracks: 1

Construction
- Structure type: Embankment
- Cycle facilities: Bike shed
- Accessible: No - stairs lead up to platform

Other information
- Status: Unstaffed
- Station code: M03

History
- Opened: 3 November 1990

Passengers
- FY2022: 127
Location
- Location within Tokushima Prefecture Location within Japan

Bunkanomori Station (文化の森駅, Bunkanomori-eki) is a passenger railway station located in the city of Tokushima, Tokushima Prefecture, Japan. It is operated by JR Shikoku and has the station number "M03".

== Lines ==
Bunkanomori Station is served by the Mugi Line and is located 3.9 km from the beginning of the line at Tokushima. All trains stop at this station.

== Layout ==
The station consists of a side platform serving a single track on a concrete embankment above the surrounding farmland. There is no station building, only a shelter on the platform and a ticket vending machine. A flight of steps leads up to the platform from the access road. A bike shed and a public telephone call box are located at the base of the stairs.

== Adjacent stations ==
«	Service	»
Mugi Line
Niken'ya	Local	Jizōbashi

== History ==
Bunkanomori Station was opened by JR Shikoku on 3 November 1990 as an added station on the existing Mugi Line.

== Passenger statistics ==
In fiscal 2022, the station was used by an average of 127 passengers daily.

== Surrounding area ==
- Tokushima Prefectural Cultural Forest Comprehensive Park

== See also ==
- List of railway stations in Japan
