= Yakuo-ji (Minami, Tokushima) =

- 薬王寺
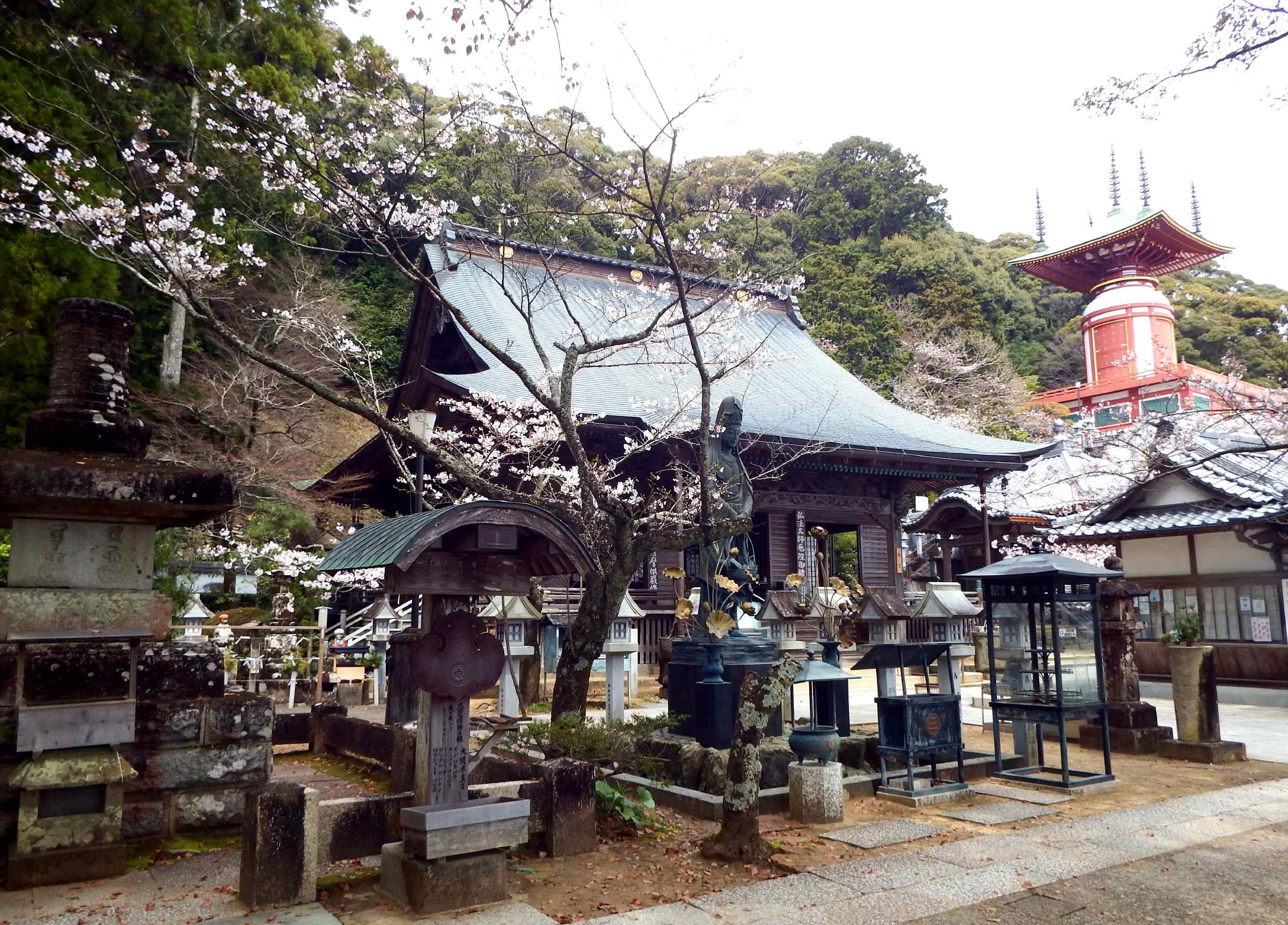

Religion
- Affiliation: Koyasan Shingon-shu
- Deity: Yakushi Nyorai
- Status: active

Location
- Location: Minami, Tokushima
- Country: Japan
- Interactive map of Yakuo-ji
- Coordinates: 33°43′56.3″N 134°31′39.3″E

Architecture
- Founder: Gyōki (by tradition)

Yakuo-ji or Yakuō-ji (Yakuo Temple) (Japanese: 薬王寺) is a Koyasan Shingon temple in Minami, Kaifu District, Tokushima Prefecture, Japan. It is temple #23 on the Shikoku 88 temple pilgrimage. The main image is of Yakushi Nyorai (Bhaiṣajyaguru: "King of Medicine Master and Lapis Lazuli Light").

== History ==
- The temple was constructed during Emperor Shōmu's reign.
- In the Bunji (文治) era, the temple was destroyed by fire.
- Emperor Go-Daigo (後醍醐天皇) (1288 – 1339) ordered the temple to be rebuilt.
- The main hall was rebuilt in 1908.

== Cultural properties ==
The sculpture of Kōbō-Daishi and the Star Mandala (Navagraha) in the temple were designated tangible cultural property of Minami by the Minami Board of Education on November 27, 2015.
