= Tainohama Station =

Railway station in Minami, Tokushima Prefecture, Japan

Tainohama Station 田井ノ浜駅
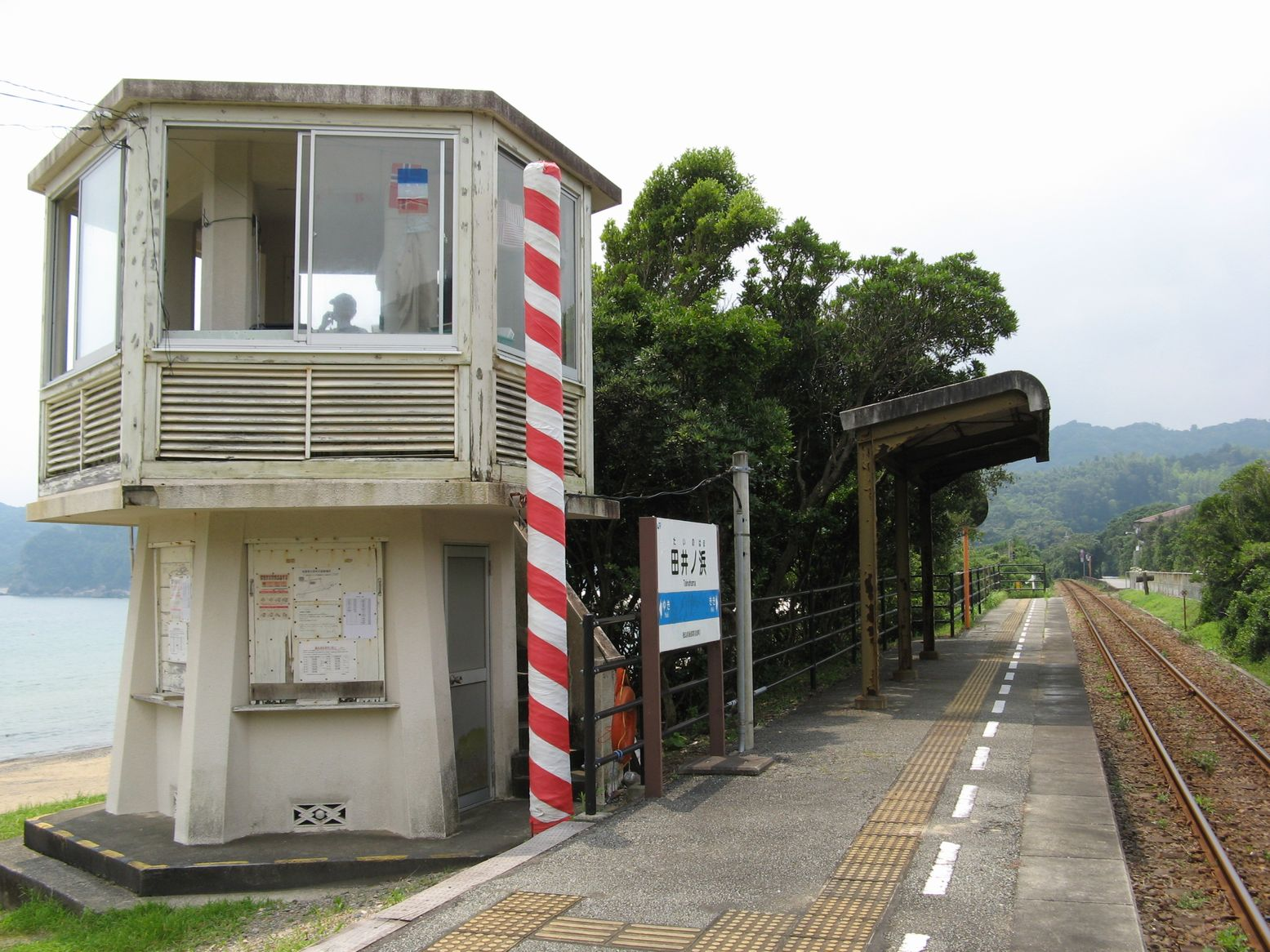
- The station platform in July 2007

General information
- Location: Tai, Minami-cho, Kaifu-gun, Tokushima-ken; Japan
- Coordinates: 33.7727°N 134.5839°E
- Operator: JR Shikoku
- Line: ■ Mugi Line
- Distance: 45.7 km from Tokushima
- Platforms: 1 side platform
- Tracks: 1

Other information
- Status: Unstaffed

History
- Opened: 3 July 1960
Location
- Location within Tokushima Prefecture Location within Japan

Tainohama Station (田井ノ浜駅, Tainohama-eki) is a seasonal passenger railway station located in the town of Minami, Tokushima, Japan. It is operated by the Shikoku Railway Company (JR Shikoku).

== Lines ==
Tainohama Station is served by the 79.3 km (49.3 mi) Mugi Line between Tokushima and Kaifu, and lies 45.7 km from the starting point of the line at Tokushima. The station is open only during the summer beach season in July and August.

== Layout ==
The station consists of one side platform serving one bi-directional track. There is no station building and the station is unattended. The station platform and entrance are located on the coast side, and it is possible to go down directly from the platform to the sandy beach of the adjacent Tainohama beach.

== Adjacent stations ==
«	Service	»
Mugi Line
Yuki	Local	Kiki

== History ==
The station opened on 3 July 1960. With the privatization of Japanese National Railways (JNR) on 1 April 1987, the station came under the control of JR Shikoku. Due to the COVID-19 pandemic, the station was closed for three summers between 2020 and 2022. It was then reopened in July 2023 for the summer season.

== Passenger statistics ==
In fiscal 2019, the station was used by around 390 passengers for the season.

== Surrounding area ==
- Tainohama Beach

== See also ==
- List of railway stations in Japan
