= Hiwasa Station =

Railway station in Minami, Tokushima Prefecture, Japan

M21 Hiwasa Station 日和佐駅
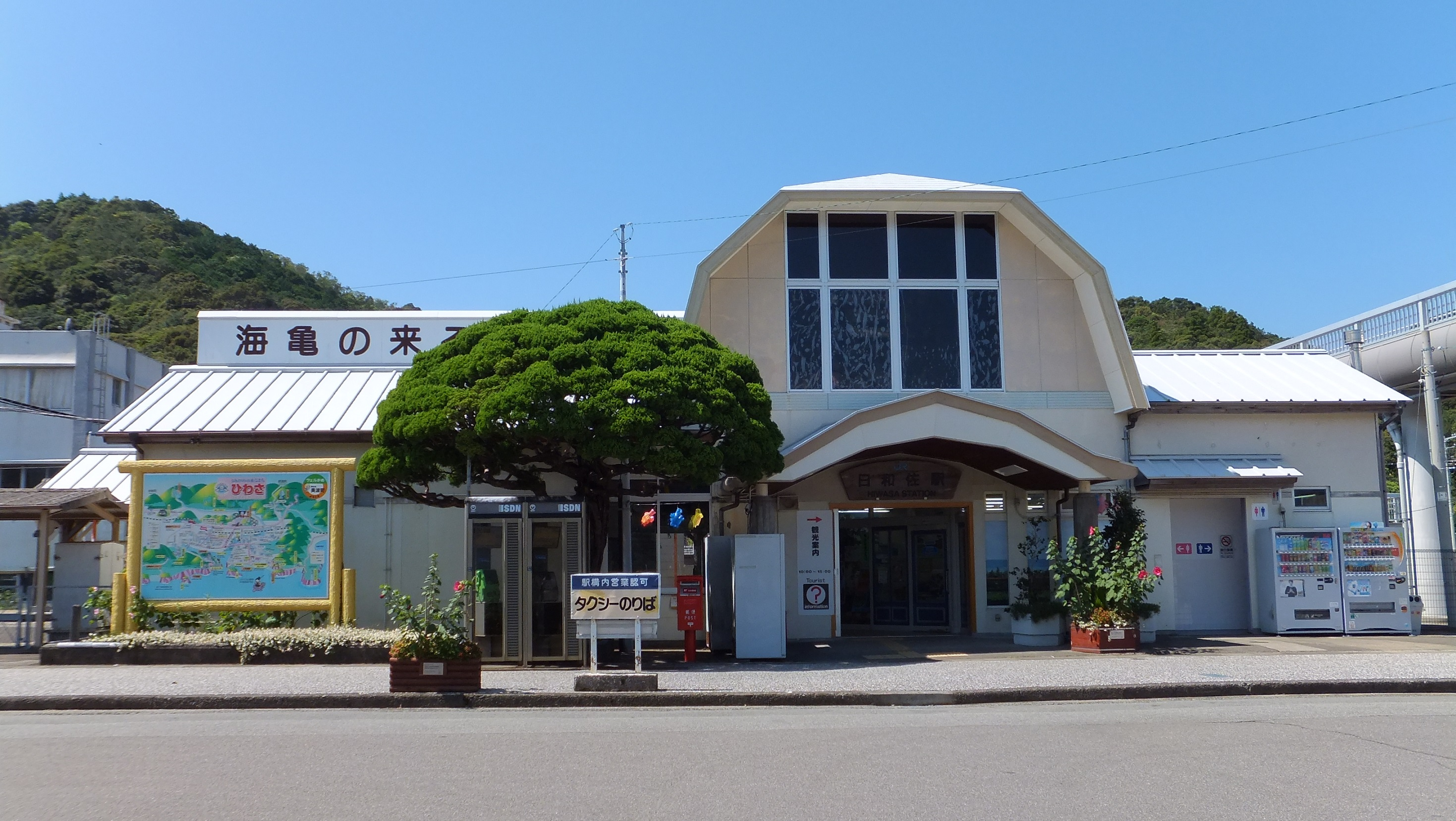
- Hiwasa Station in September 2015

General information
- Location: Okugawauchi, Minami-cho, Kaifu-gun, Tokushima-ken 779-2305; Japan
- Coordinates: 33.7289°N 134.5305°E
- Operator: JR Shikoku
- Line: ■ Mugi Line
- Distance: 53.3 km from Tokushima
- Platforms: 1 side + 1 island platforms
- Tracks: 2 + 1 passing loop + 1 siding

Construction
- Structure type: At grade
- Parking: Available
- Accessible: Yes - platforms linked by ramps and level crossing

Other information
- Status: Unstaffed but some types of tickets sold by a kan'i itaku agent nearby
- Station code: M21

History
- Opened: 14 December 1939

Passengers
- FY2019: 320
Location
- Location within Tokushima Prefecture Location within Japan

Hiwasa Station (日和佐駅, Hiwasa-eki) is a passenger railway station located in the town of Minami, Kaifu District, Tokushima Prefecture, Japan. It is operated by JR Shikoku and has the station number "M21".

== Lines ==
Hiwasa Station is served by the Mugi Line and is located 53.3 km from the start of the line at Tokushima. As of the Muroto limited express' discontinuation in March 2025, only local trains service the line. As a result, all trains stop at this station.

== Layout ==
Hiwasa Station consists of a side platform and an island platform serving two tracks. A passing loop runs on the other side of the island platform. In addition, a siding branches off track 1, ending near the station building. The station building is located on the east side of the tracks and houses a waiting room as well as a local tourist information office. The ticket window is unstaffed, but some types of tickets are sold by kan'i itaku agents at a shop for local products and tourist information office located at the Hiwasa Road Station on the west side of the tracks. Access to the island platform is by means of a level crossing or a metal footbridge. Both also lead to a second station entrance on the west side.

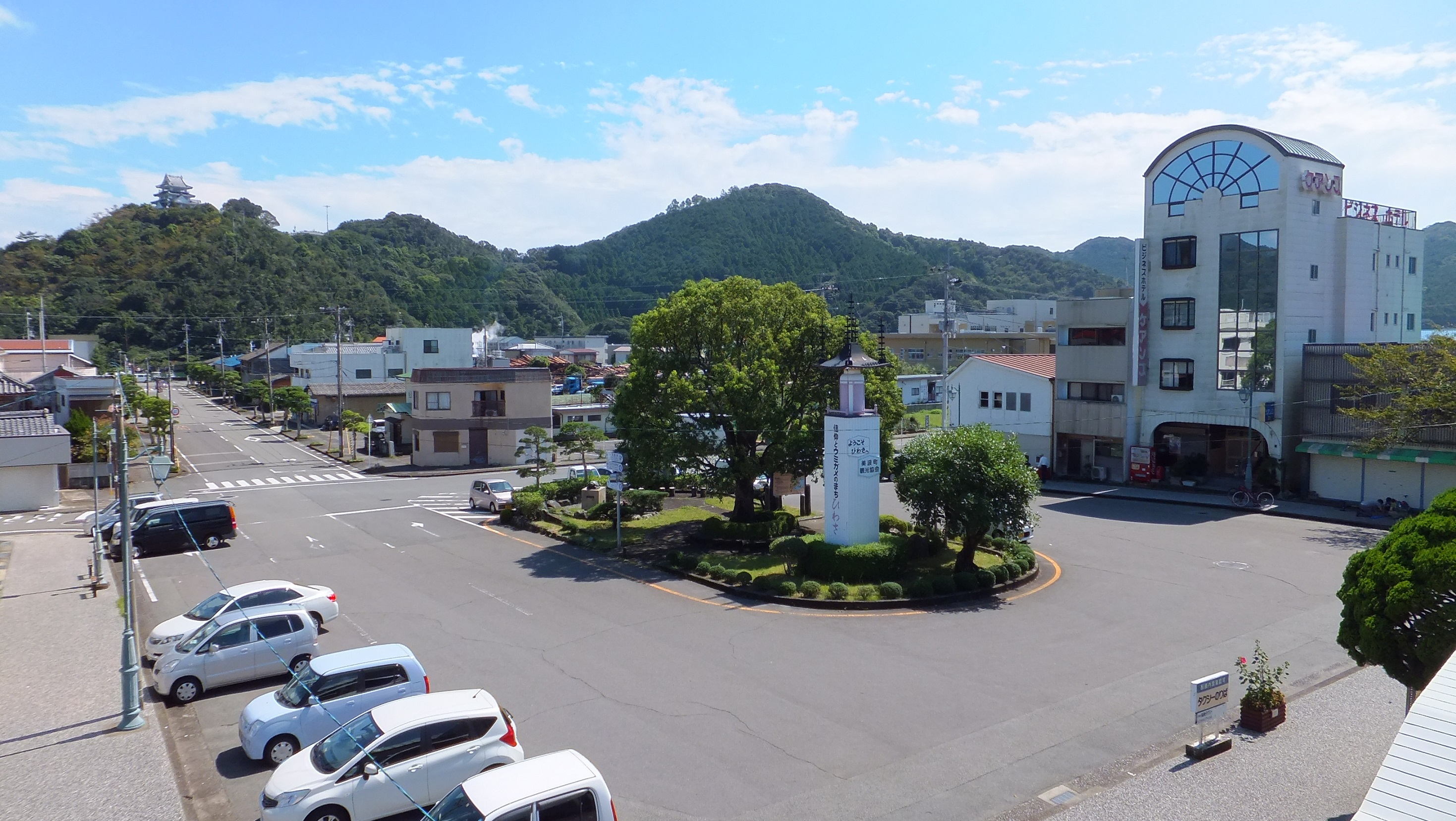
The station forecourt on the east side. The station building is just off to the right side of the picture.

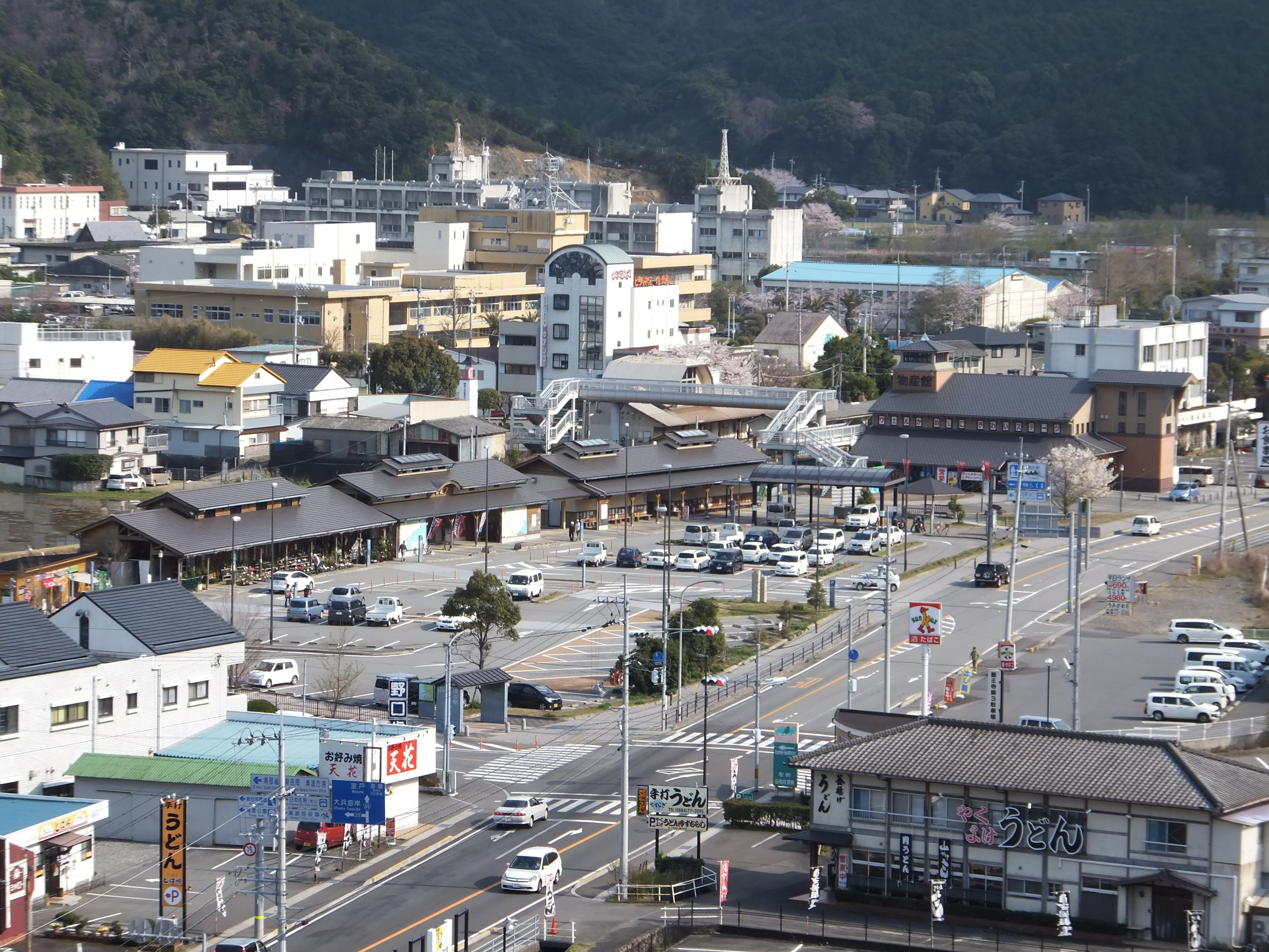
A good birds-eye view of the west side of the station. The low buildings with tiled roofs are part of the Hiwasa Road Station. The metal footbridge gives access to the east side of the station which is partly obscured by the bridge.

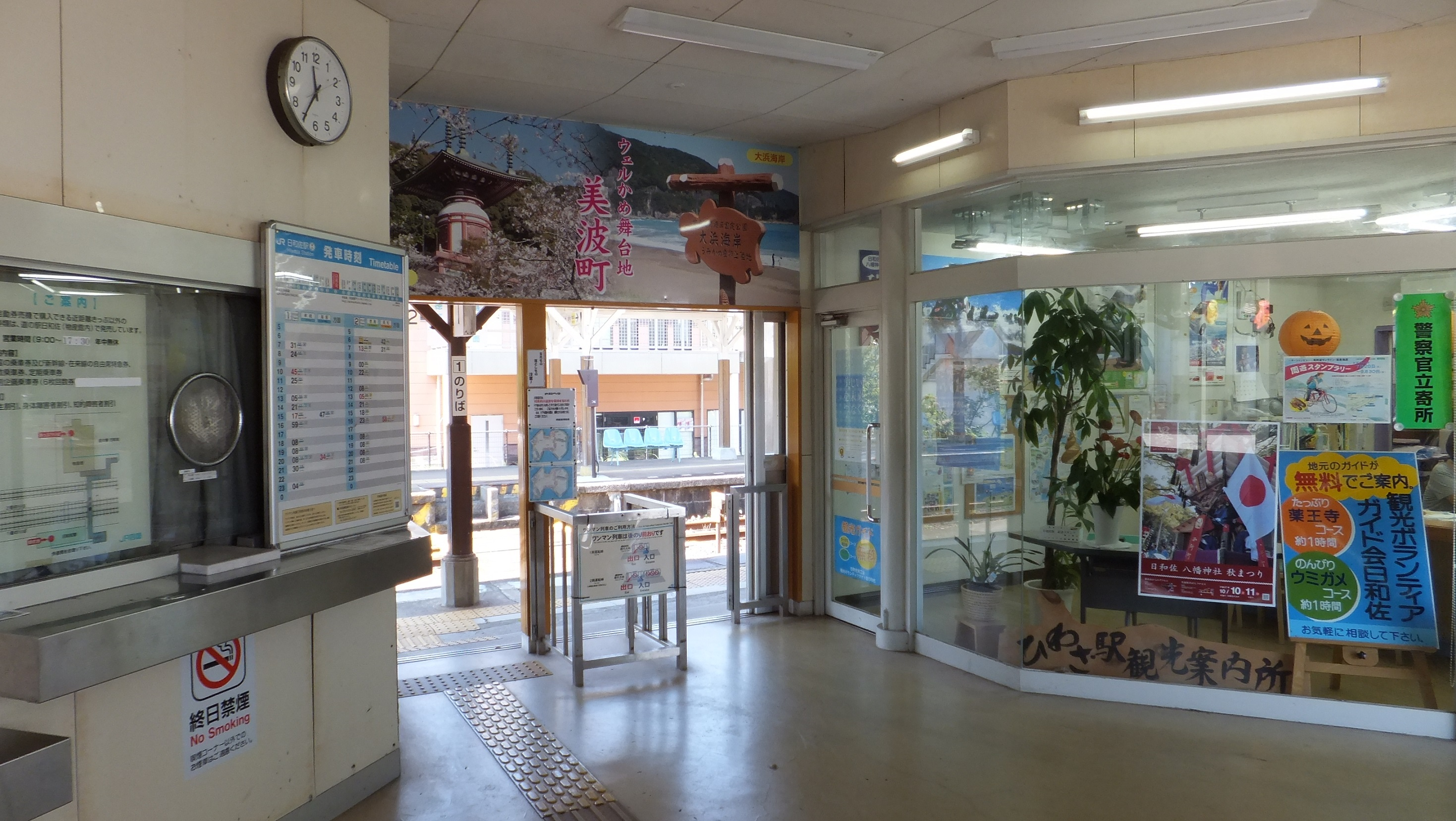
Station ticket gate. To the right is the "Hiwasa Station Tourism Information Centre". This place does not sell tickets.

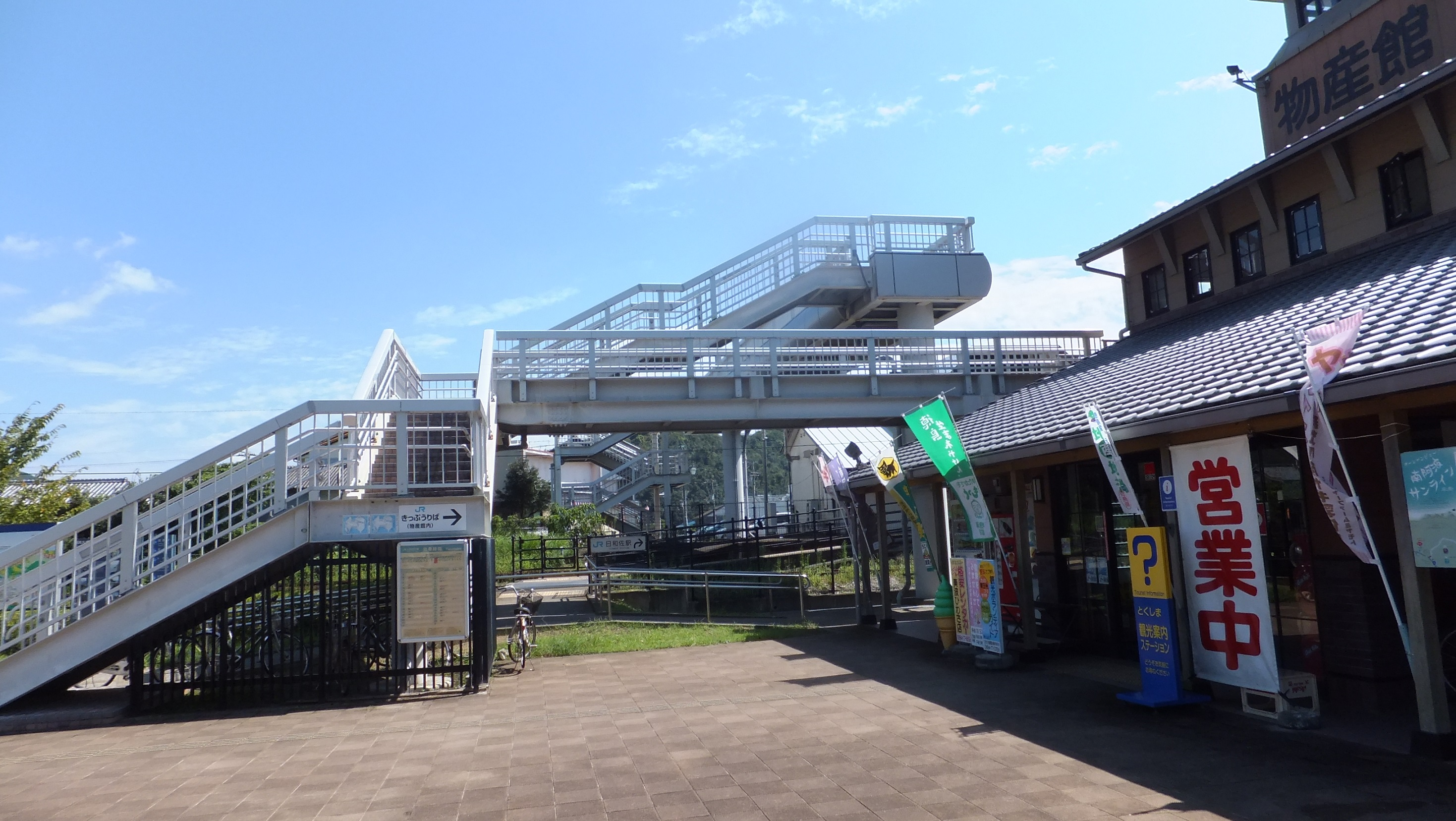
Station west entrance with the footbridge and entry to the level crossing. To the right is a shop for local products and also the kan'i itaku agent. The sign with the arrow says "JR tickets on sale (inside shop)".

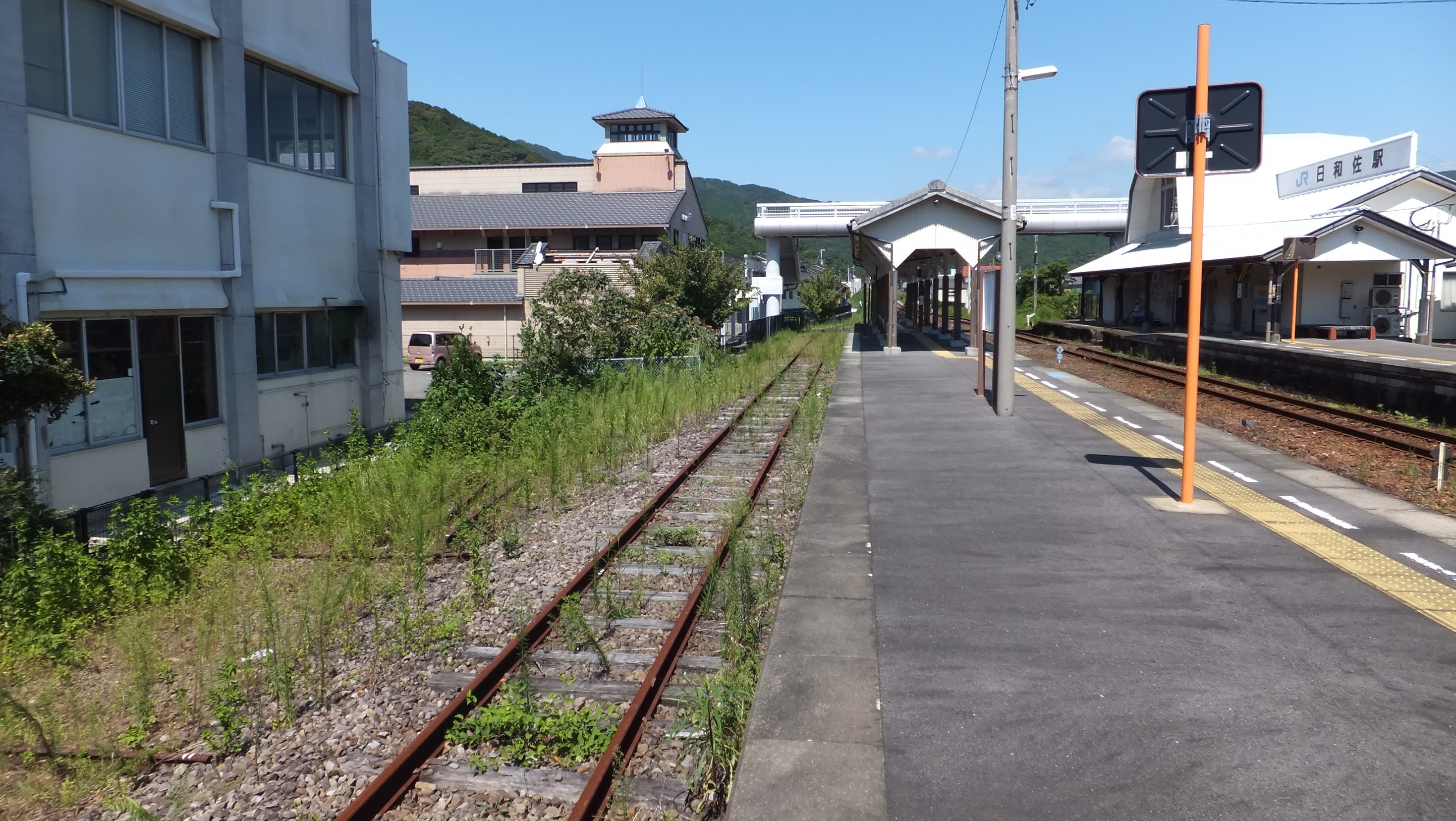
The passing loop is not much used and overgrown with weeds. In the distance can be seen the level crossing, with the west entrance to the left, under the footbridge.

== Adjacent stations ==
«	Service	»
Mugi Line
Kitagawachi	Local	Yamagawachi

== History ==
Japanese Government Railways (JGR) opened Hiwasa Station on 14 December 1939 as the terminus of the Mugi Line which had been extended southwards from Awa-Fukui. Hiwasa became a through-station on 1 July 1942 when the line was further extended to Mugi. On 1 April 1987, with the privatization of Japanese National Railways (JNR), the successor of JGR, JR Shikoku took over control of the station.

== Passenger statistics ==
In fiscal 2019, the station was used by an average of 320 passengers daily.

== Surrounding area ==
- Hiwasa Road Station - a roadside station (michi no eki) located at the west entrance of the railway station. Among its facilities is a centre exhibiting and selling local products which also incorporates a post office and a tourism information centre and which also sells some types of JR rail tickets.
- Minami Town Hall
- Yakuo-ji

== See also ==
- List of railway stations in Japan
