= Mugi Station =

Railway station in Mugi, Tokushima Prefecture, Japan

M24 Mugi Station 牟岐駅
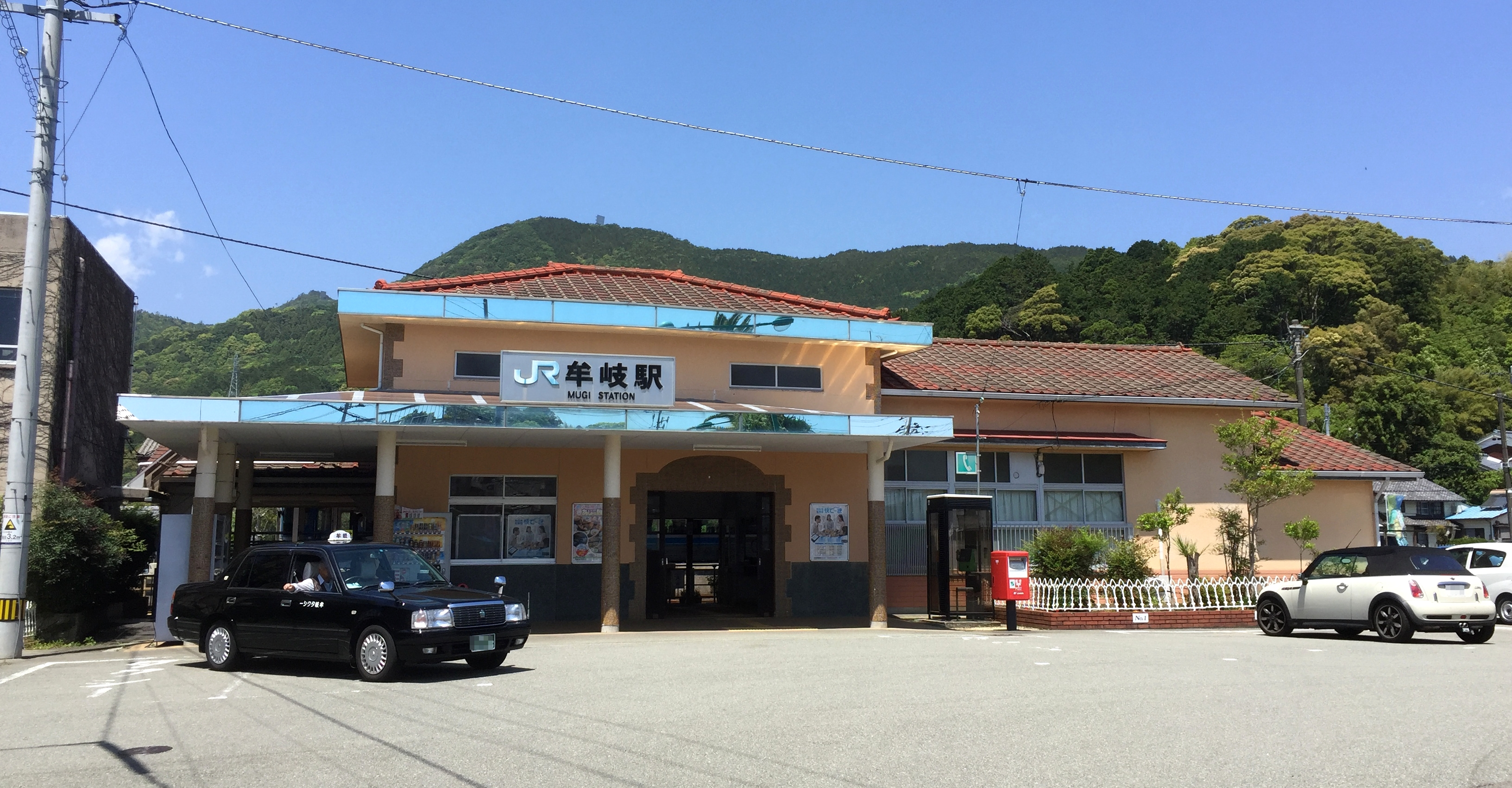
- Mugi Station in May 2016

General information
- Location: Nakamura, Mugi-cho, Kaifu-gun, Tokushima-ken 775-0006; Japan
- Coordinates: 33.6725°N 134.4179°E
- Operator: JR Shikoku
- Line: ■ Mugi Line
- Distance: 67.7 km from Tokushima
- Platforms: 1 island platform
- Tracks: 2 + 2 passing loops + 2 sidings

Construction
- Structure type: At grade
- Parking: Available
- Accessible: Yes - platforms linked by ramps and level crossing

Other information
- Status: Staffed - JR ticket window
- Station code: M24
- Website: Official website

History
- Opened: 1 July 1942

Passengers
- FY2019: 276
Location
- Location within Tokushima Prefecture Location within Japan

Mugi Station (牟岐駅, Mugi-eki) is a passenger railway station located in the town of Mugi, Kaifu District, Tokushima Prefecture, Japan. It is operated by JR Shikoku and has the station number "M24".

== Lines ==
Mugi Station is served by the Mugi Line and is located 67.7 km from the start of the line at Tokushima. All trains stop at this station.

Prior to March 2025, it was the southern terminus for the Muroto limited express service, which previously ran between Mugi and Tokushima.

== Layout ==
Mugi Station consists of an island platform serving two tracks. As the station was until 1973 the southern terminus of the Mugi line, numerous passing loops and sidings branch off from the main tracks. The station building houses a waiting room and a JR ticket window (without a Midori no Madoguchi facility). Access to the island platform is by means of a level crossing with ramps.

=== Platforms ===
1	■ Mugi Line	for Awa-Kainan
2	■ Mugi Line	for Anan and Tokushima

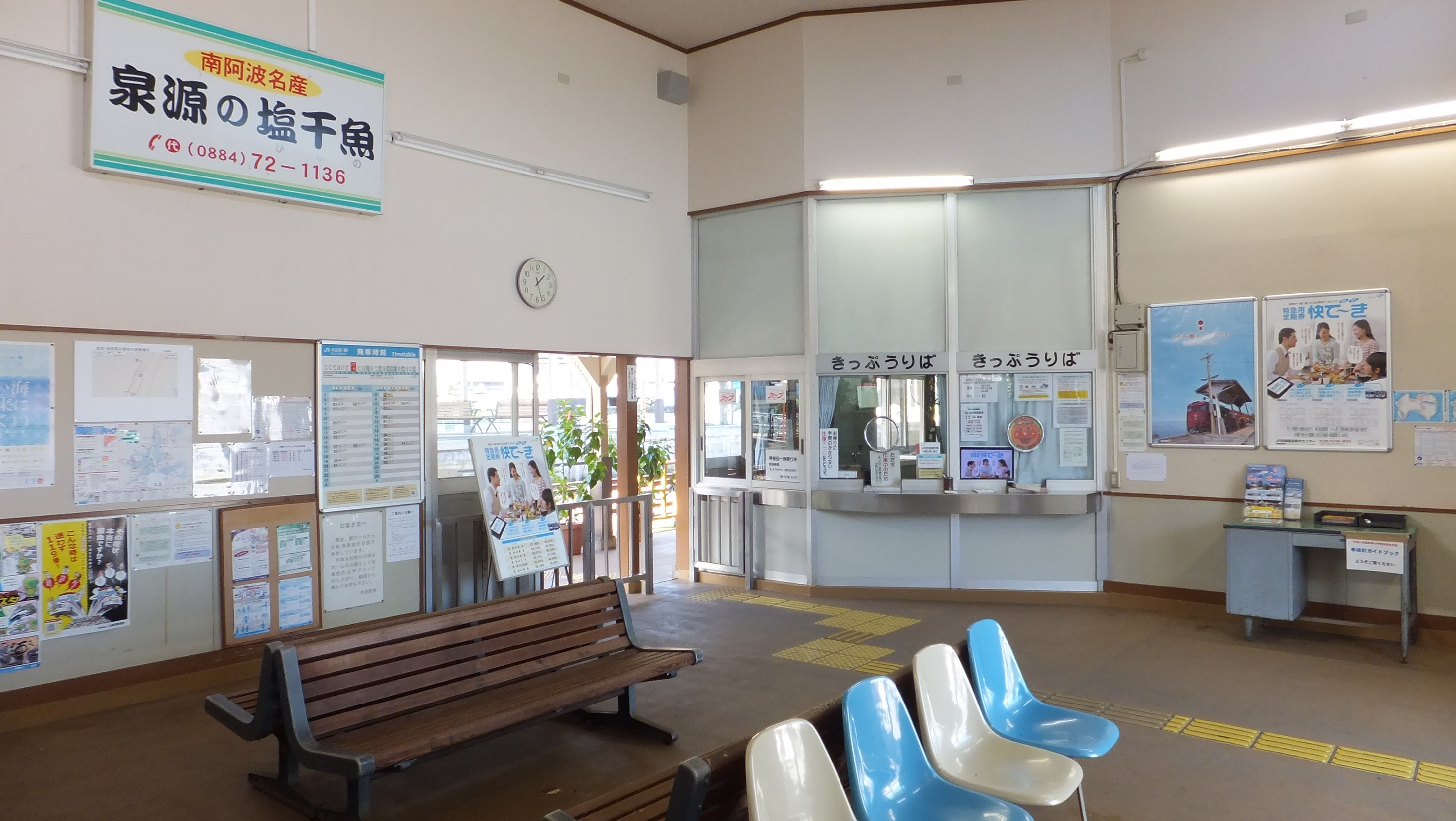
Waiting room and ticket window of Mugi Station.

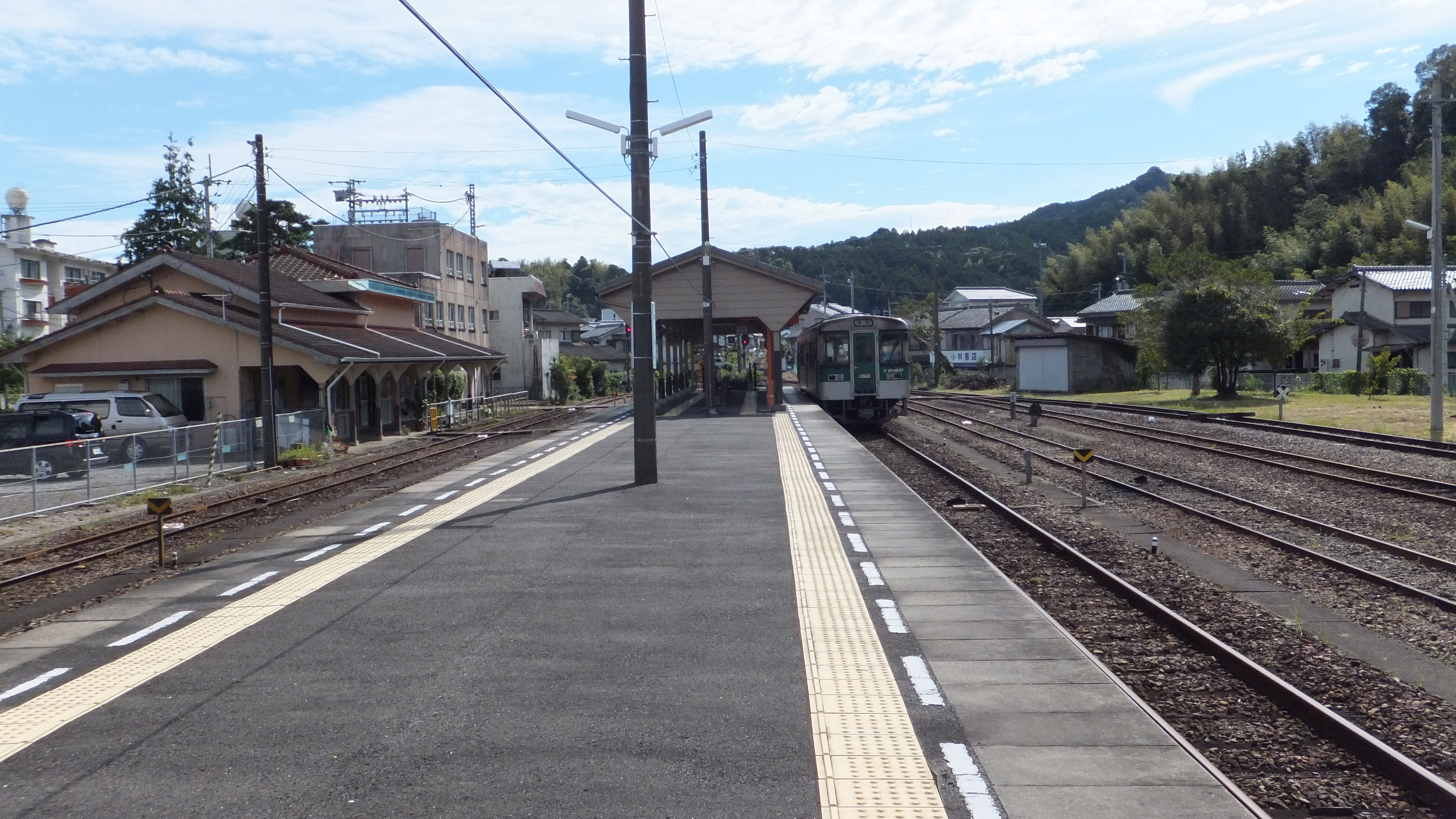
A view of the station platforms and tracks. There is a passing loop to the left between track 1 and the station building. To the right of track 2 is another passing loop and various sidings. Note the level crossing at the far end of the platform.

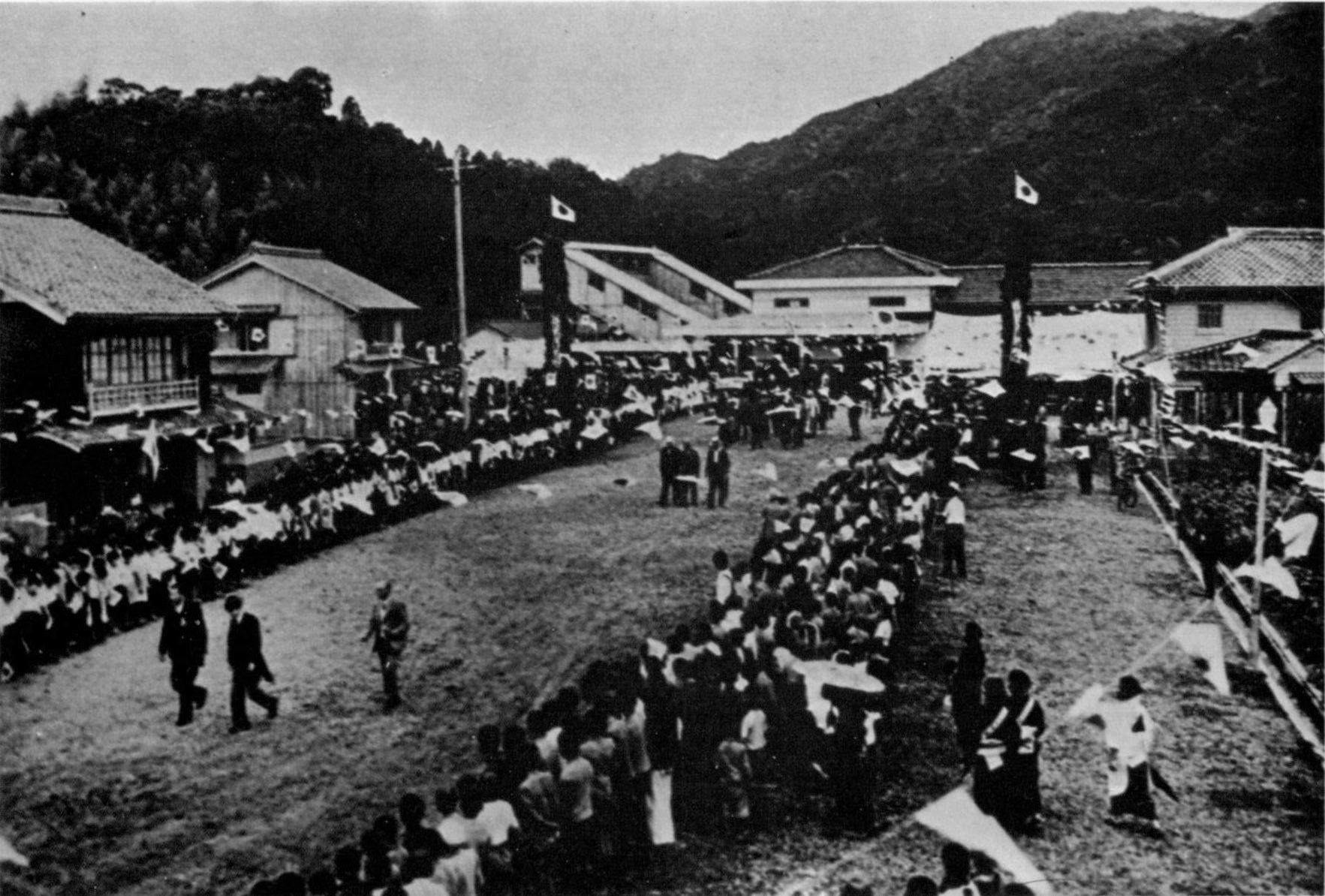
Historic photo taken on the day the station was opened. Note the station building in the background. There was, at the time, a footbridge linking to the platforms.

== Adjacent stations ==
«	Service	»
Mugi Line
Hegawa	Local	Sabase

== History ==
Japanese Government Railways (JGR) opened the station on 1 July 1942 as the terminus of the Mugi Line which had been extended southwards from Hiwasa. Mugi was the southern terminus of the line until 1 October 1973 when the line was extended further south to Kaifu. On 1 April 1987, with the privatization of Japanese National Railways (JNR), the successor of JGR, control of the station passed to JR Shikoku.

== Passenger statistics ==
In fiscal 2019, the station was used by an average of 276 passengers daily.

== Surrounding area ==
- Mugi Town Hall
- Tokushima Prefectural Kaifu Hospital

== See also ==
- List of railway stations in Japan
