= Awa-Fukui Station =

Railway station in Anan, Tokushima Prefecture, Japan

M17 Awa-Fukui Station 阿波福井駅
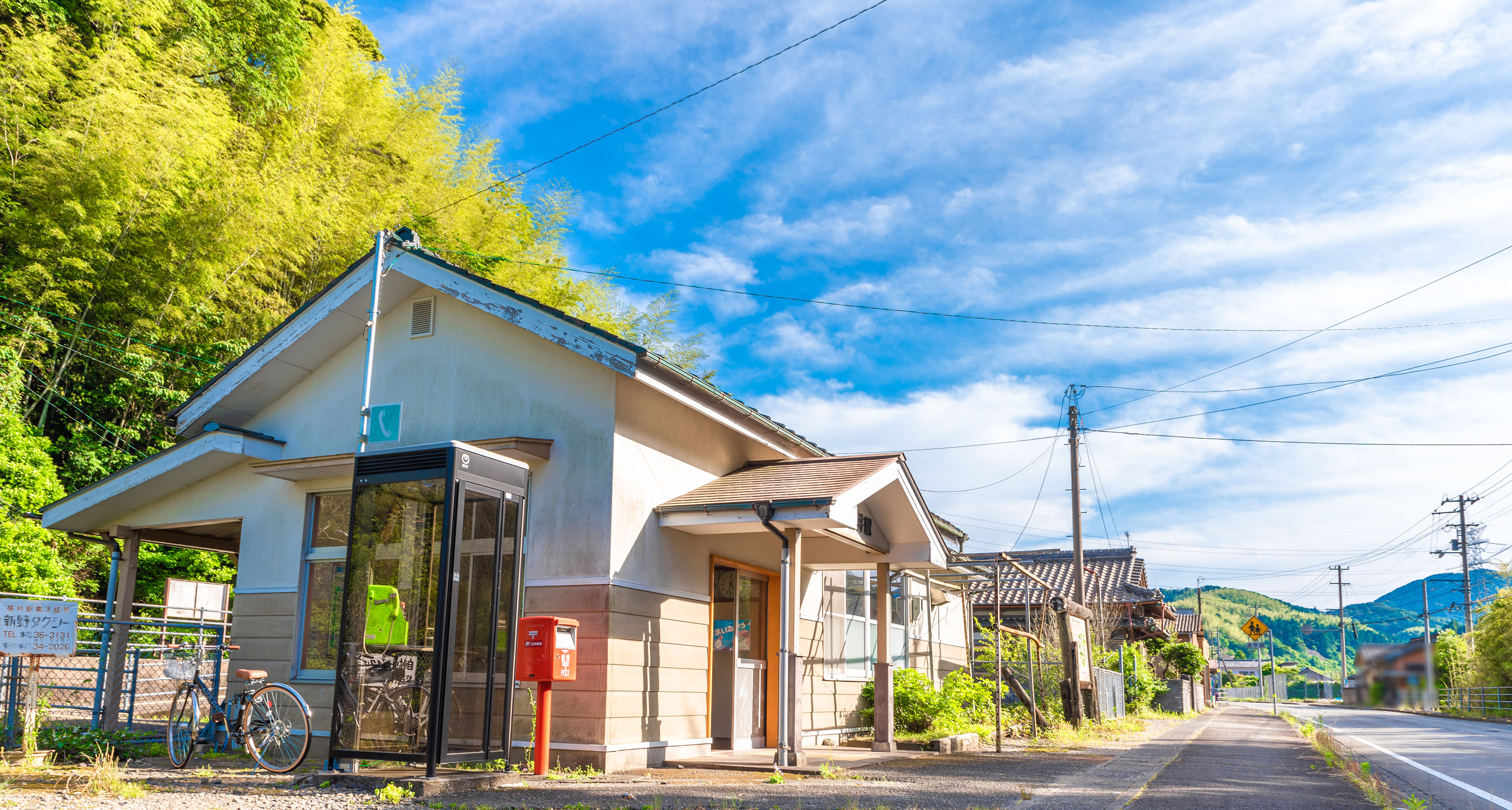
- Awa-Fukui Station building in May 2022

General information
- Location: Fukuicho, Anan-shi, Tokushima-ken 779-1620; Japan
- Coordinates: 33.8243°N 134.6054°E
- Operator: JR Shikoku
- Line: ■ Mugi Line
- Distance: 38.9 km from Tokushima
- Platforms: 1 side platform
- Tracks: 1

Construction
- Structure type: At grade
- Accessible: Yes - platform accessed by ramp

Other information
- Status: Unstaffed
- Station code: M17

History
- Opened: 27 June 1937

Passengers
- FY2019: 76
Location
- Location within Tokushima Prefecture Location within Japan

Awa-Fukui Station (阿波福井駅, Awa-Fukui-eki) is a passenger railway station located in the city of Anan, Tokushima Prefecture, Japan. It is operated by JR Shikoku and has the station number "M17".

== Lines ==
Awa-Fukui Station is served by the Mugi Line and is located 38.9 km from the beginning of the line at Tokushima. All trains stop at this station.

== Layout ==
The station consists of a side platform serving a single track. The station building is unstaffed and serves only as a waiting room. Access to the platform is by means of a ramp from the station building.

== Adjacent stations ==
«	Service	»
Mugi Line
Aratano	Local	Yuki

== History ==
Japanese Government Railways (JGR) opened the station on 27 June 1937 as the terminus of the Mugi Line when the track was extended southwards from Kuwano. It became a through-station on 14 December 1939 when the track was further extended to Hiwasa. On 1 April 1987, with the privatization of Japanese National Railways (JNR), the successor of JGR, JR Shikoku took over control of the station.

== Passenger statistics ==
In fiscal 2019, the station was used by an average of 76 passengers daily.

== Surrounding area ==
Japan National Route 55 passes in front of the station and there is a lot of traffic, but the surrounding area is mountainous with sparse buildings. The station was originally established as a gateway to Fukui Village (later merged into Tachibanacho and then merged into Anan City), but the village center is about 2 kilometers to the north.

== See also ==
- List of railway stations in Japan
