= Kaifu District, Tokushima =

District in Tokushima prefecture, Japan

Coordinates: 33.691°N 134.375°E

Location in Tokushima Prefecture See SVG File

Kaifu (海部郡, Kaifu-gun) is a district located in Tokushima Prefecture, Japan.

As of June 1, 2019, the district has an estimated population of 18,863 and a population density of 35.9 inhabitants per square kilometre (93/sq mi). The total area is 525.07 km^{2} (202.73 sq mi).

== Towns and villages ==
- Mugi
- Kaiyō
- Minami

== Municipal timeline ==
- March 31, 2006: The towns of Kainan, Kaifu and Shishikui merged to form the new town of Kaiyō. On the same date, the towns of Hiwasa and Yuki merged to form the new town of Minami.
