= Cape Muroto =

Headland in Japan

Cape Muroto 室戸岬
- Cape
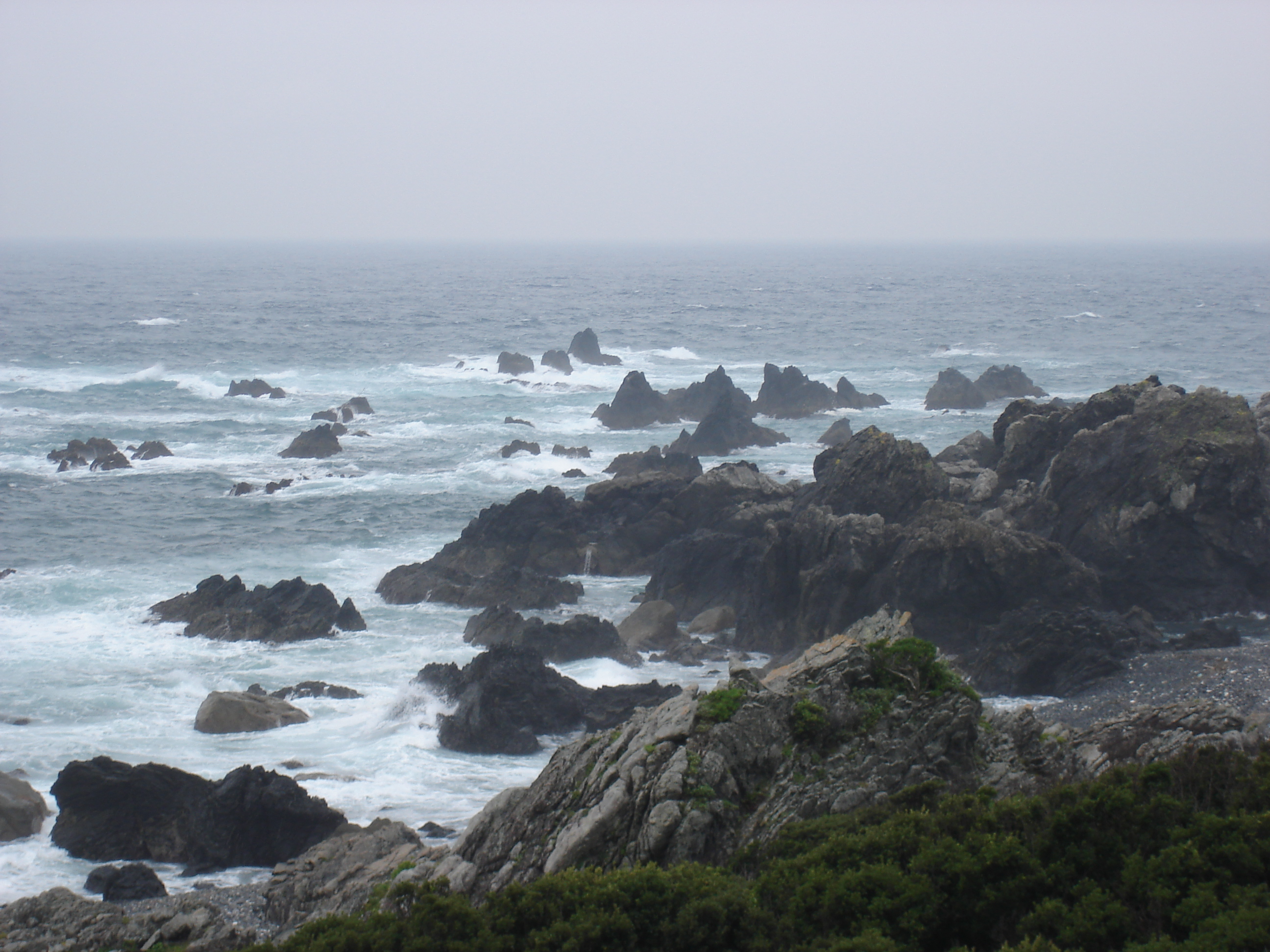
- View from Kanjōgahama (灌頂ヶ浜) at the cape

- Location of Cape Muroto on Shikoku Cape Muroto (Japan)
- Coordinates: 33°15′12″N 134°10′39″E
- Location: Muroto, Kōchi Prefecture, Japan
- National Place of Scenic Beauty Natural Monument

Cape Muroto (室戸岬, Muroto-misaki) is a headland at the southeastern tip of the Japanese island of Shikoku, in the city of Muroto, Kōchi Prefecture. Extending into the Pacific Ocean and situated in Muroto UNESCO Global Geopark within Muroto-Anan Kaigan Quasi-National Park, the cape has been designated a Place of Scenic Beauty and the local vegetation a Natural Monument, while the Sound of the Waves at Cape Muroto and Mikurodo Cave is among the 100 Soundscapes of Japan.

== Cultural features ==
On the summit overlooking the cape is Hotsumisaki-ji, the twenty-fourth temple on the Shikoku Pilgrimage, as well as Cape Muroto Lighthouse, which started operating in 1899, and a statue of Nakaoka Shintarō.

== Geology ==
Due to the subduction of the Philippine Sea Plate beneath the Eurasian Plate in the Nankai Trough, some 140 kilometres (87 mi) off the cape, the land around the cape is being uplifted at a rate of 1 metre (3 ft 3 in) to 2 metres (6 ft 7 in) per millennium, at the top end of the world's uplift rates.

== Fauna ==
Birds observed in the vicinity of the cape include the osprey and blue rock thrush. Marine life in the waters offshore includes the Japanese amberjack, Japanese anchovy, Japanese barramundi, Japanese jack mackerel, Japanese mackerel, Japanese pilchard, Pacific mackerel, Blackfin seabass, three-line grunt, and spear squid.

== Access ==
- Kochi Tobu Kotsu
  - For Toyo・Kannoura Station
  - For Muroto・Nahari Station・Yasuda・Aki Station・Aki Office
- Tokushima Bus
  - For Maiko Bus stop・Namba Station
- Asa Seaside Railway (1 return on only holidays)
  - For Awa-Kainan Station (extends to this station via Asato Line)

== See also ==
- List of Places of Scenic Beauty of Japan (Kōchi)
- List of Natural Monuments of Japan (Kōchi)
- Muroto Typhoon, Second Muroto Typhoon
- Cape Ashizuri
- Kūkai
- The Asatō Line, which uses dual-mode vehicles to reach Cape Muroto
  - Dual-mode vehicle (the Asatō Line is said to be the first line in the world to use this technology)
