= Kannoura Station =

Railway station in Tōyō, Kōchi Prefecture, Japan

Kannoura Station 甲浦駅
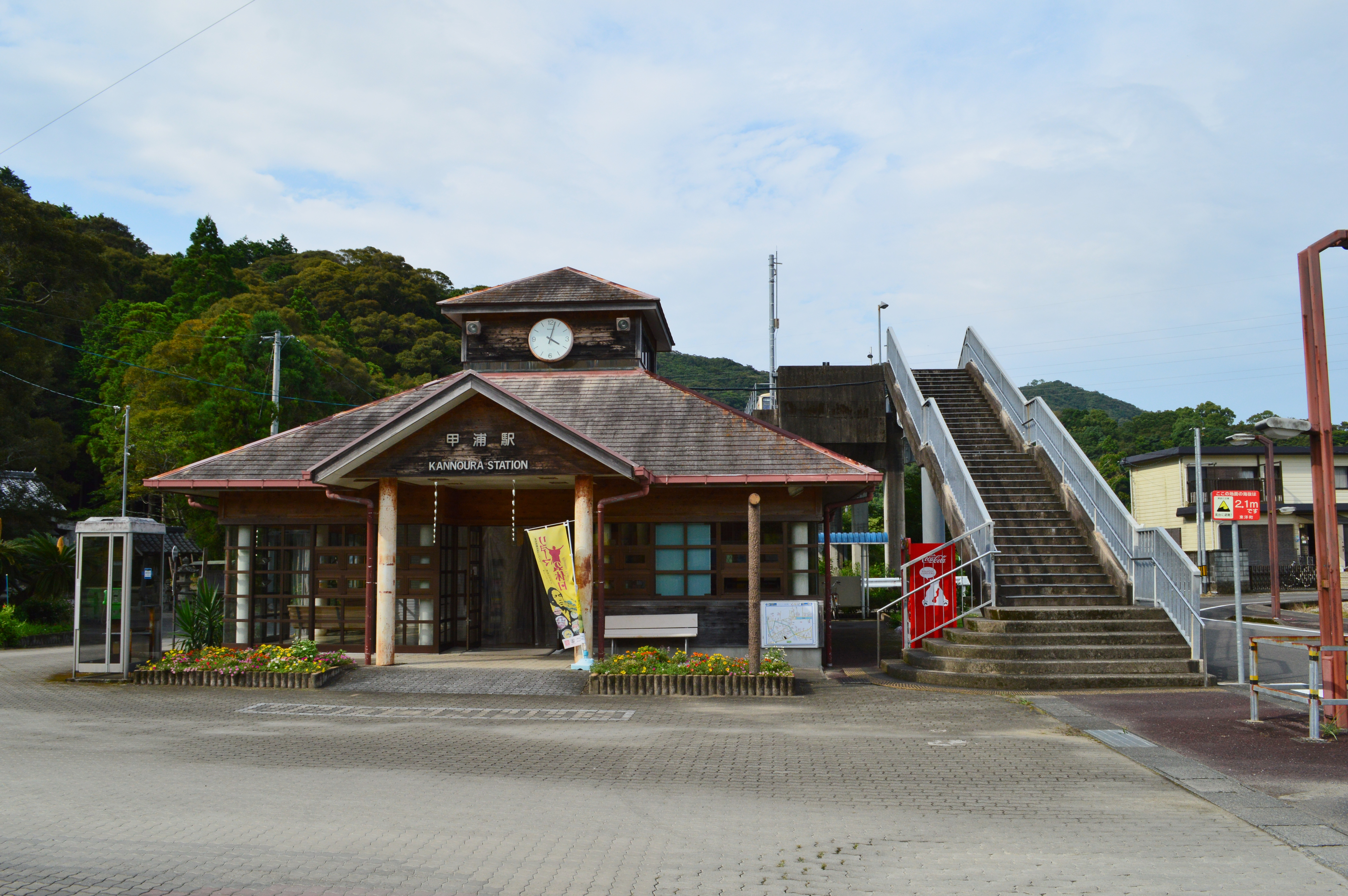
- Kannoura Station in 2016

General information
- Location: Kawauchi, Toyo-cho, Aki-gun, Kōchi-ken 781-7412; Japan
- Coordinates: 33°32′50″N 134°17′18″E
- Operator: ■ Asa Kaigan Railway
- Line: ■ Asatō Line
- Distance: 10.0 km from Awa-Kainan
- Platforms: 1 side platform
- Tracks: 1

Construction
- Structure type: Elevated
- Parking: Available
- Cycle facilities: Available
- Accessible: No - steps to platform

Other information
- Status: Kan'i itaku station
- Station code: AK30
- Website: Official website

History
- Opened: 26 March 1992
Location
- Location within Japan

Kannoura Station (甲浦駅, Kannoura-eki) is a railway station on the Asatō Line in Tōyō, Aki District, Kōchi Prefecture, Japan. It is operated by the third sector Asa Kaigan Railway and bears the station number "TK30". DMV commenced operation from 2021, so this station has become a signal station at which passengers don't get on and off. The DMV stops at the bus terminal near this station.

== Lines ==
The station is the southern terminus of the Asatō Line and is located 8.5 km from the beginning of the line at Awa-Kainan. Only DMV stop in front of the station.

== Layout ==
The station consisted of a side platform serving an elevated track. With the DMV service, the platform is not open to the public anymore, but it is possible to observe the mode change of the DMV at the platform entrance.

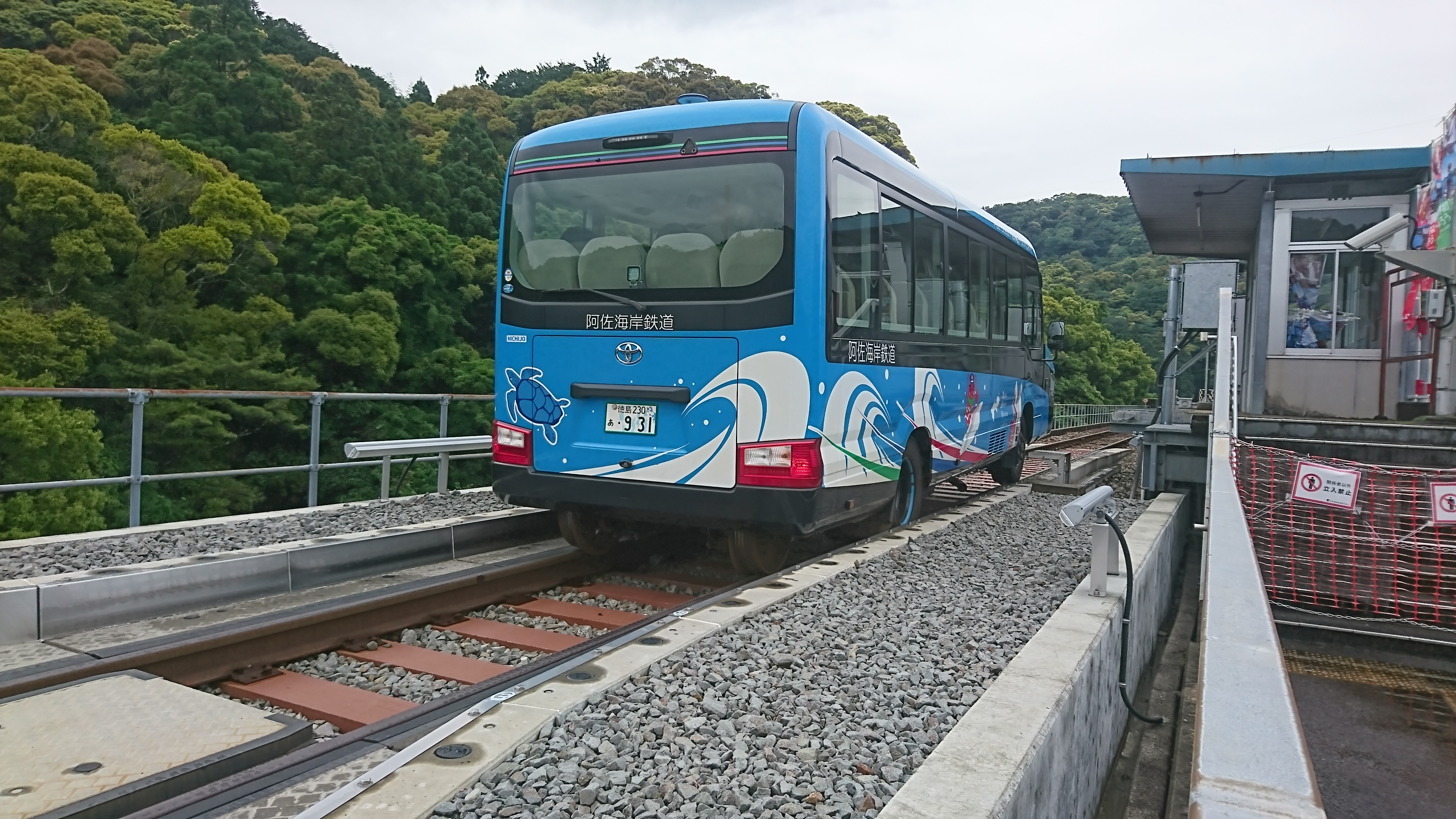
DMV changing to Railway Mode at Kannoura Station

A station building on ground level houses a waiting room and a shop run by the Kannoura Women's Association (甲浦婦人会, Kannoura-fujinkai) which sells tickets as a kan'itaku agent. Bicycle and car parking facilities are available and bike rentals are offered. Access to the platform is by means of a flight of steps next to the station building.

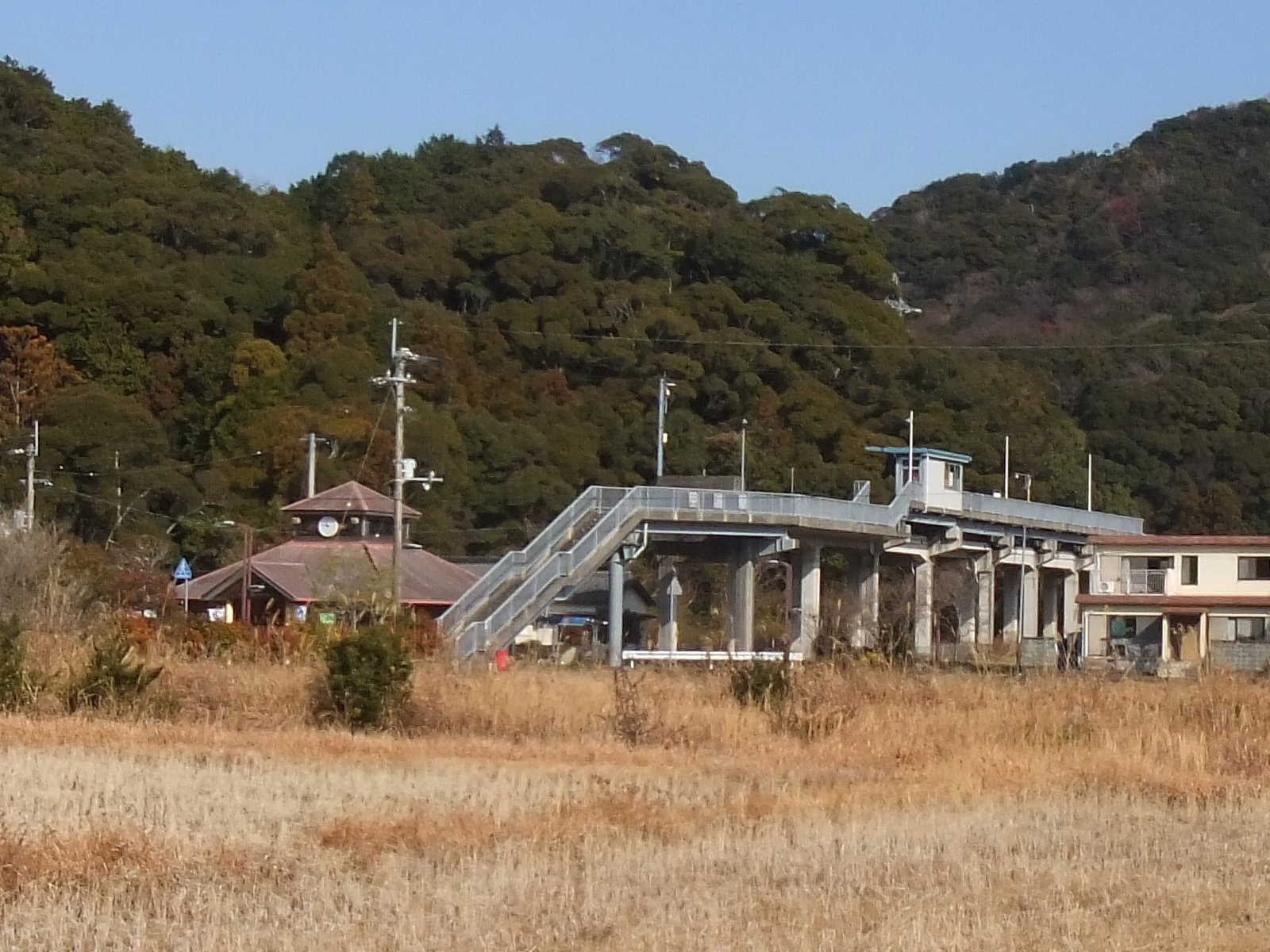
A view of the elevated track with the station to the left (before the construction of roads exclusively for dual-mode vehicles).

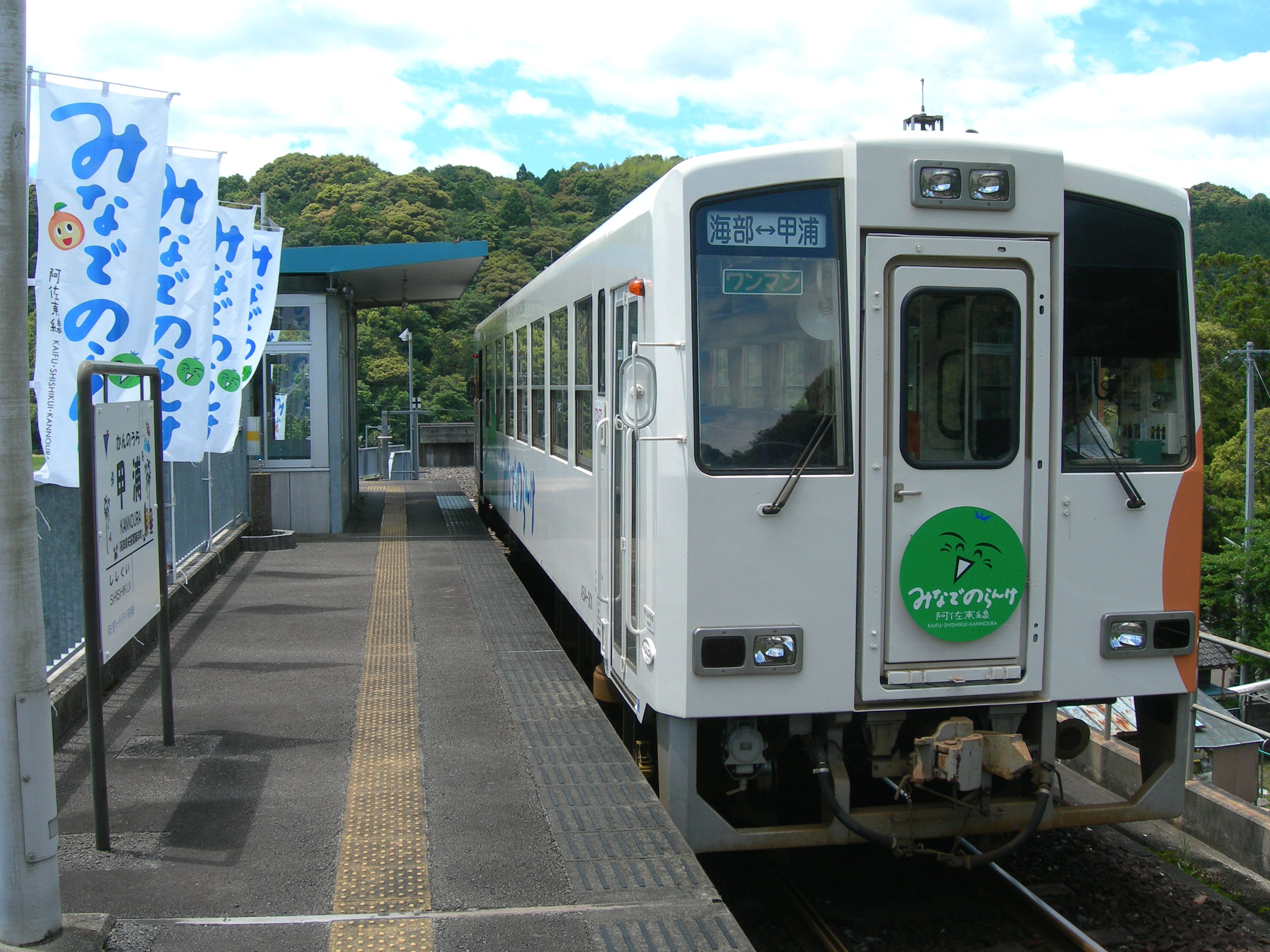
A view of the station platform. The track ends just behind the train (before the construction of roads exclusively for dual-mode vehicles).

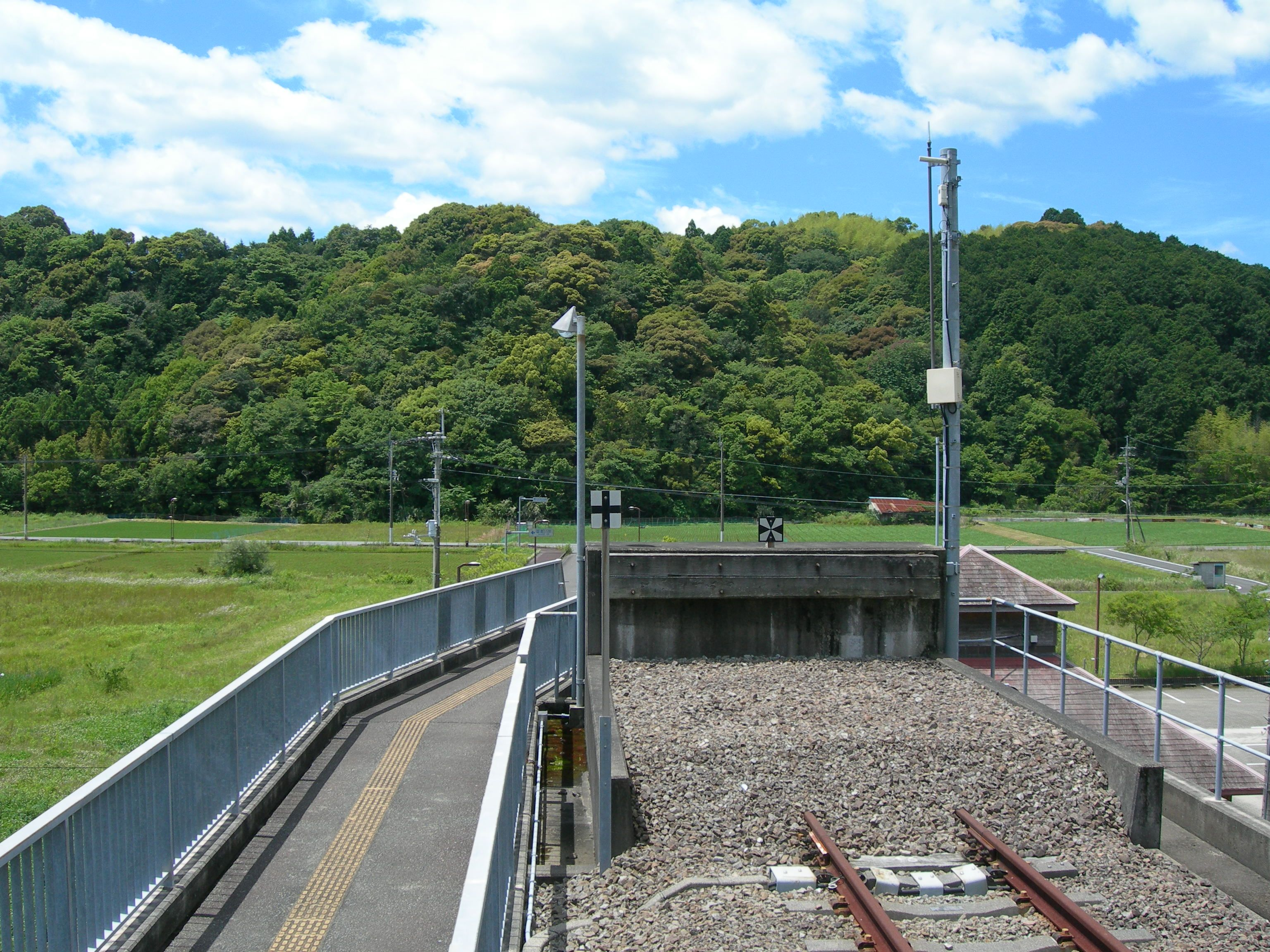
The end of the Asatō Line track (before the construction of roads exclusively for dual-mode vehicles).

Asa Seaside Railway will be operating on the Asato Line by dual-mode vehicles for the first time in the world. The DMV runs to and from this station as trains or to and from this station as buses. The changeover facilities for DMV operation were constructed in 2020.

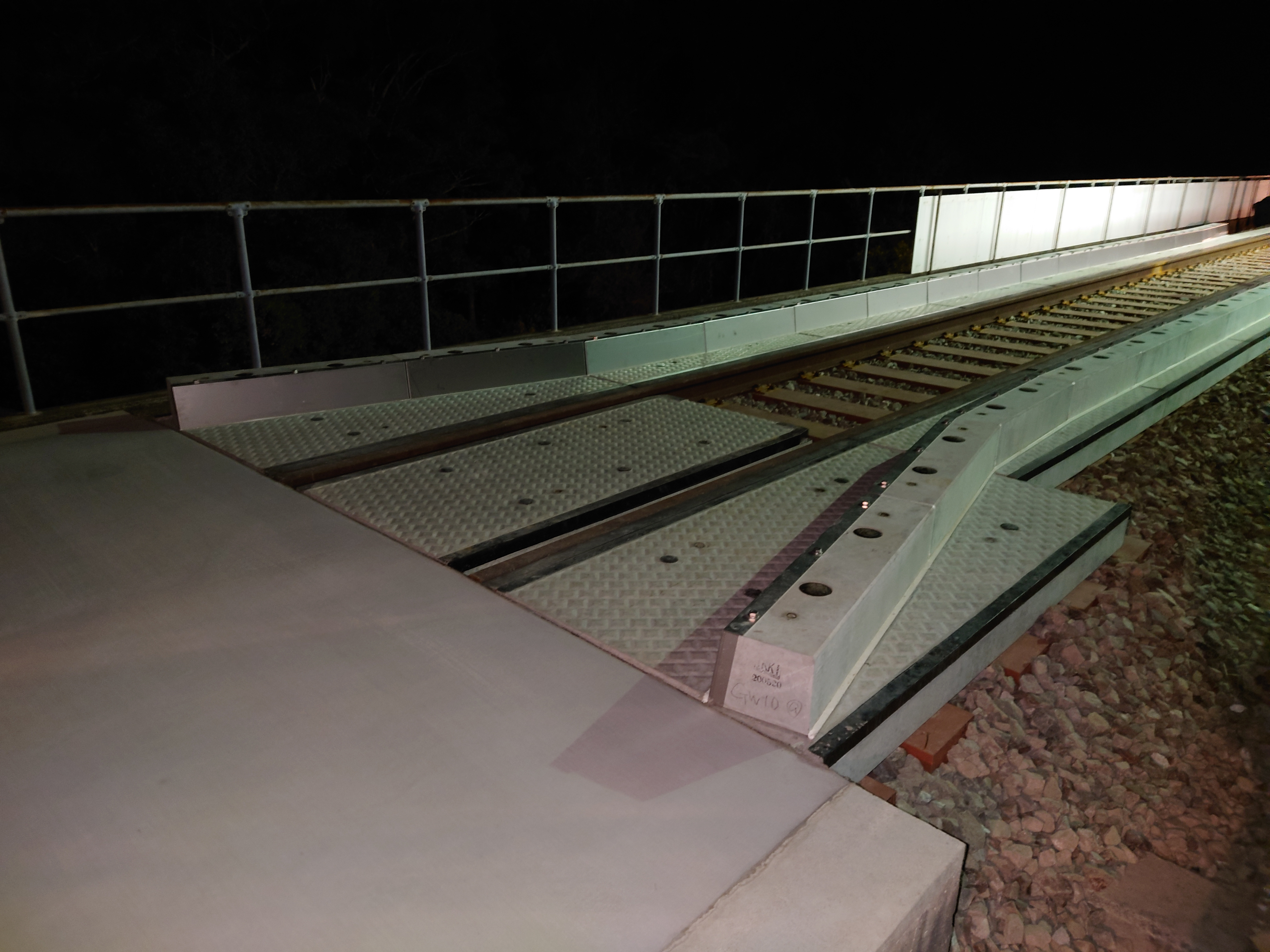
Changeover facilities of DMV from/to train mode to/from bus mode (after the construction of roads exclusively for dual-mode vehicles).

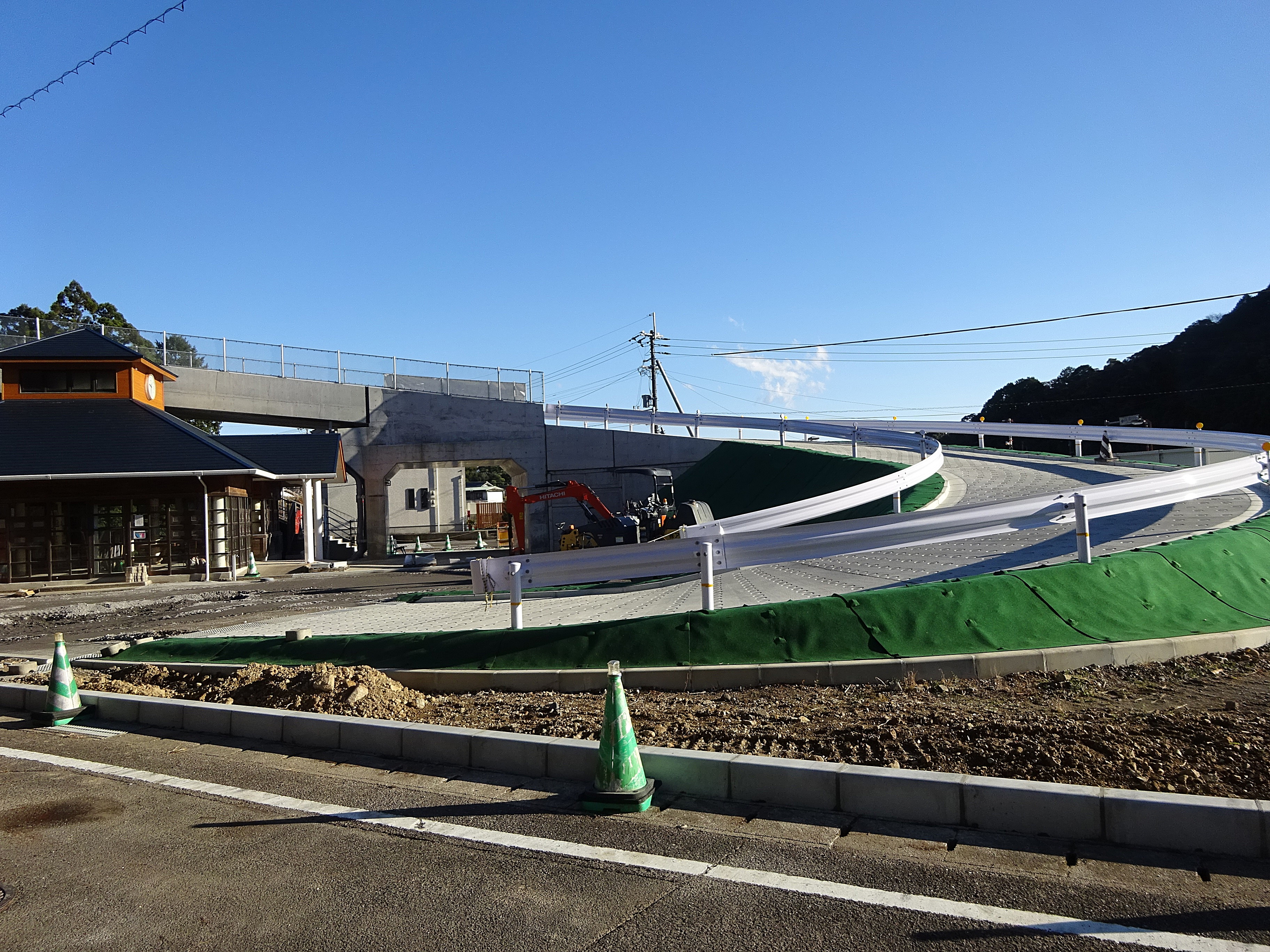
The end of the Asatō Line track and the reserved road for DMV extends from the end of the railway line to the bus terminal (after the construction of roads exclusively for dual-mode vehicles).

== Adjacent stations ==
«	Service	»
Asatō Line
Shishikui	Local	For Cape Muroto; Michi no Eki Shishikui Onsen

== History ==
The station was opened on 26 March 1992 by the third sector Asa Kaigan Railway as the southern terminus of the three station Asatō Line.

== Passenger statistics ==
In fiscal 2011, the station was used by an average of 40 passengers daily.

== Bus terminal ==
=== DMV ===
- Asa Seaside Railway
  - For Awa-Kainan Bunkamura via Asato Line
  - For Umi no Eki Toyo・Michi no Eki Shishikui Onsen
  - For Cape Muroto (Only on holidays)

=== Route buses ===
- Tokushima Bus Nambu
  - For Kannoura guchi・Shishikui Station・Kaifu Station・Awa-Kainan Station・Asakawa Station・Sabase Station・Mugi Station
- Kochi Tobu Kotsu

Track	Name	NO	via	Destination	Operator	Note
Kannoura Station	Muroto・Kannoura Line	Inbound	Muroto World Geo Park Center・Mitsuzaka Tunnel・Muroto Highschool・Muroto	Muroto Office	Kochi Tobu Kotsu	
Kannoura Station	Muroto・Kannoura Line	outbound		Kannoura-Kishikabe	Kochi Tobu Kotsu	

This route is a bustitution of Asa Line.

=== Expressway buses ===
==== Kannoura bus stop ====
This bus stop is located near Kannoura Junior highschool and Kannoura guchi bus stop.

Track	Name	NO	via	Destination	Operator	Note
甲浦	Muroto・Ikumi・Anan - Osaka Line	inbound	Shishikui・Kaifu・Asakawa・Mugi・Yuki・Tachibana Office・Anan Station・Maigo bus stop	Namba Station	Tokushima Bus	Passengers are able to get on and off bus stops in between Anan Station and Kannoura Station.
甲浦	Muroto・Ikumi・Anan - Osaka Line	outbound		Ikumi	Tokushima Bus	
甲浦	Muroto・Ikumi・Anan - Osaka Line	outbound	Ikumi・None・Geo Park Center	Muroto	Tokushima Bus	

== See also ==
- List of railway stations in Japan
