= Shishikui Station =

Railway station in Kaiyō, Tokushima Prefecture, Japan

Shishikui Station 宍喰駅
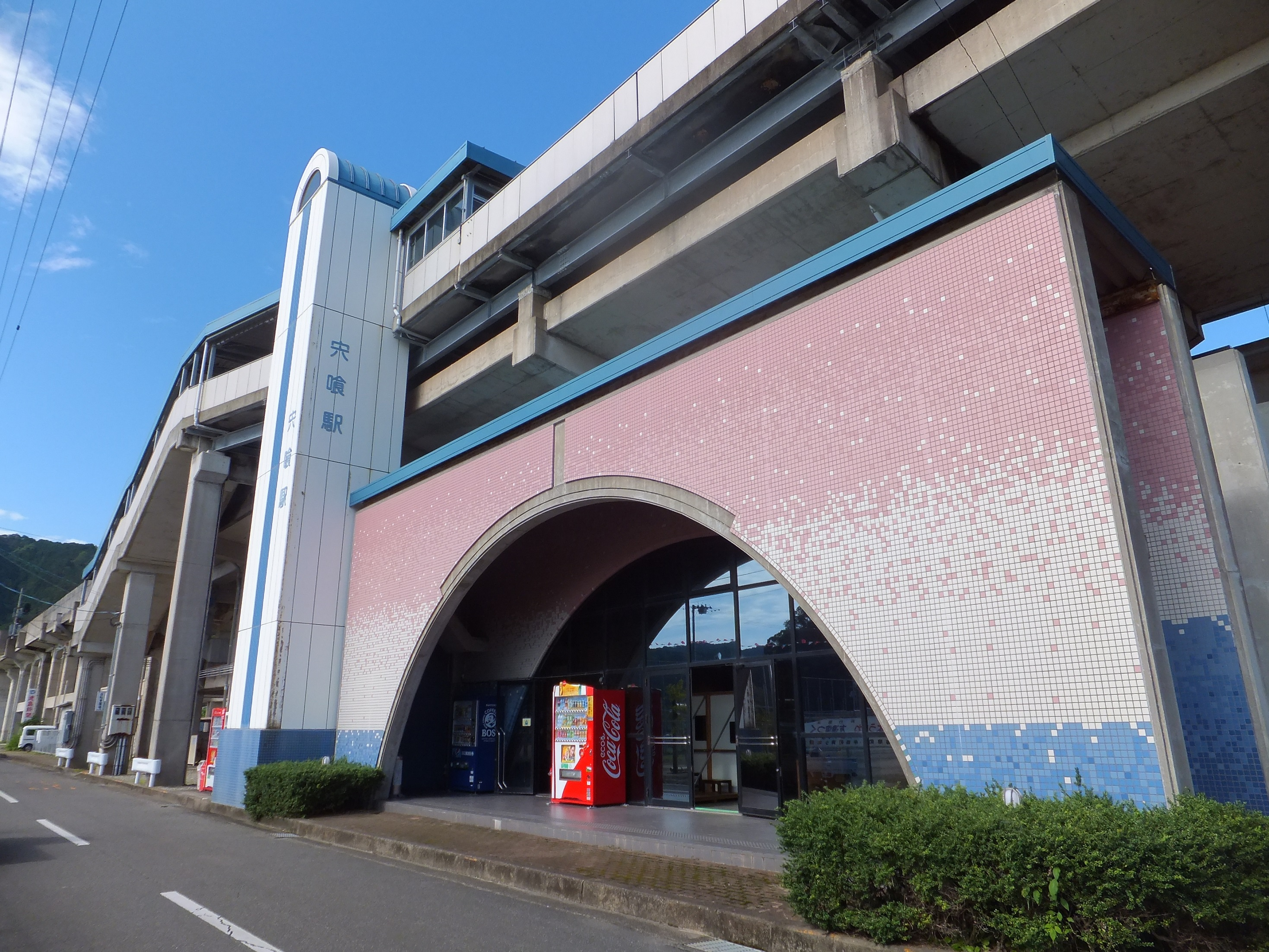
- Shishikui Station in 2015

General information
- Location: Kubo, Kaiyō-cho, Kaifu-gun, Tokushima-ken 775-0502; Japan
- Coordinates: 33°34′00″N 134°18′00″E
- Operator: ■ Asa Kaigan Railway
- Line: ■ Asatō Line
- Distance: 7.6 km from Awa-Kainan
- Platforms: 1 side platform
- Tracks: 1

Construction
- Structure type: Elevated
- Parking: Available
- Cycle facilities: Available
- Accessible: Yes - elevator to platform

Other information
- Status: Staffed ticket window/travel centre
- Station code: AK29
- Website: Official website

History
- Opened: 26 March 1992

Passengers
- FY2011: 38
Location
- Location within Tokushima Prefecture Location within Japan

Shishikui Station (宍喰駅, Shishikui-eki) is a passenger railway station located in the town of Kaiyō, Kaifu District, Tokushima Prefecture, Japan. It is operated by the third-sector Asa Kaigan Railway and bears the station number "TK29".

== Lines ==
Shishikui Station is served by the Asatō Line and is located 7.6 km from the terminus of the line at Awa-Kainan. Only local trains stop at the station.

== Layout ==
The station consists of a side platform serving an elevated track. An unused siding runs alongside but is not connected to the main track. The station building within the elevated structure houses a waiting area and a ticket window. This also doubles as a travel centre and acts as an agent for various types of travel tickets including those for JR Shikoku. The platform has a small shelter for waiting passengers and can be accessed by steps or an elevator. Car and bicycle parking is available and bike rentals are offered.

Just south of the station, a siding branches off the track and leads to the depot of the Asa Kaigan railway.

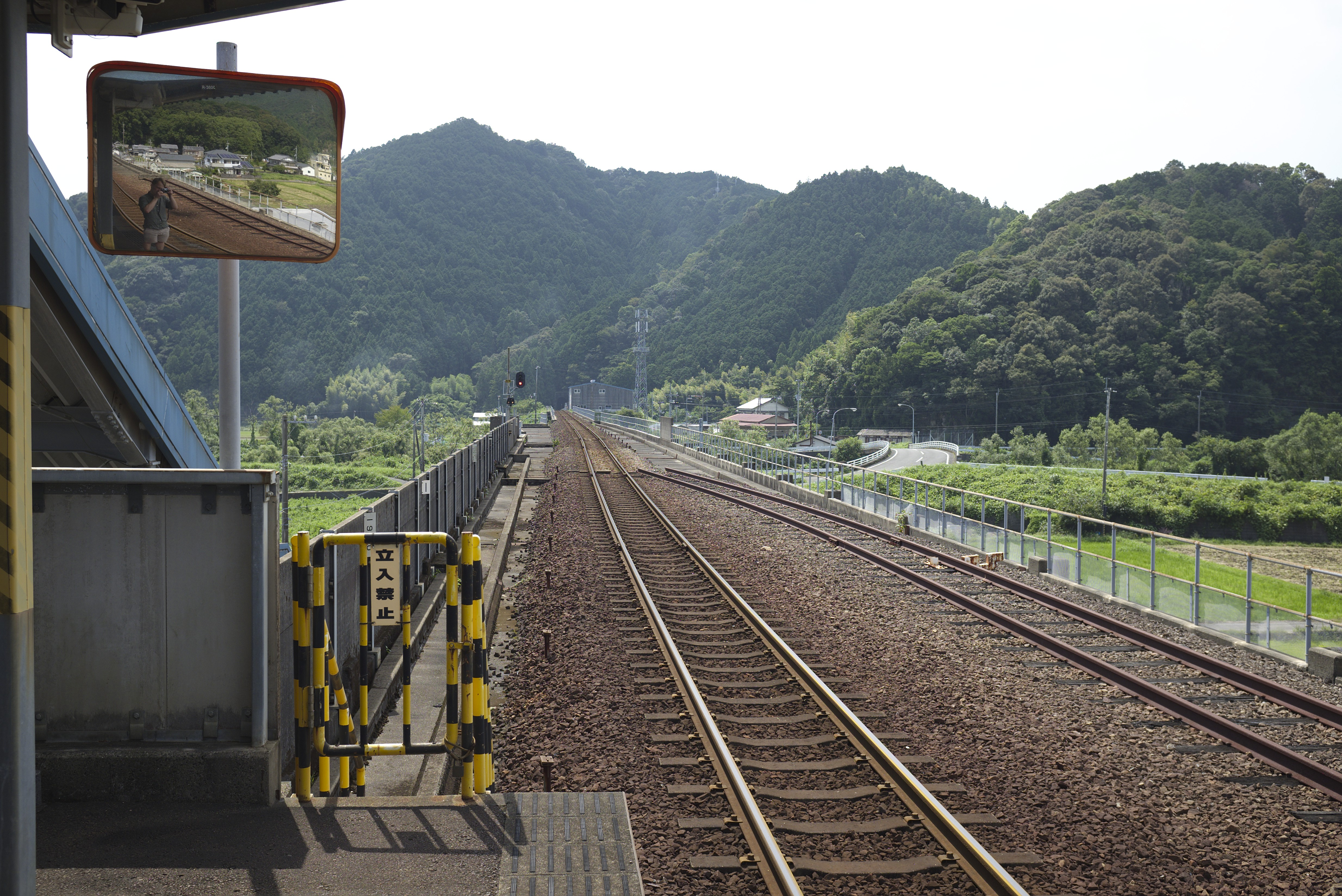
A view of the station platform and track, looking in the direction of Kannoura. Note the siding to the right is not connected to the main track. The large shed in the distance is the train depot.

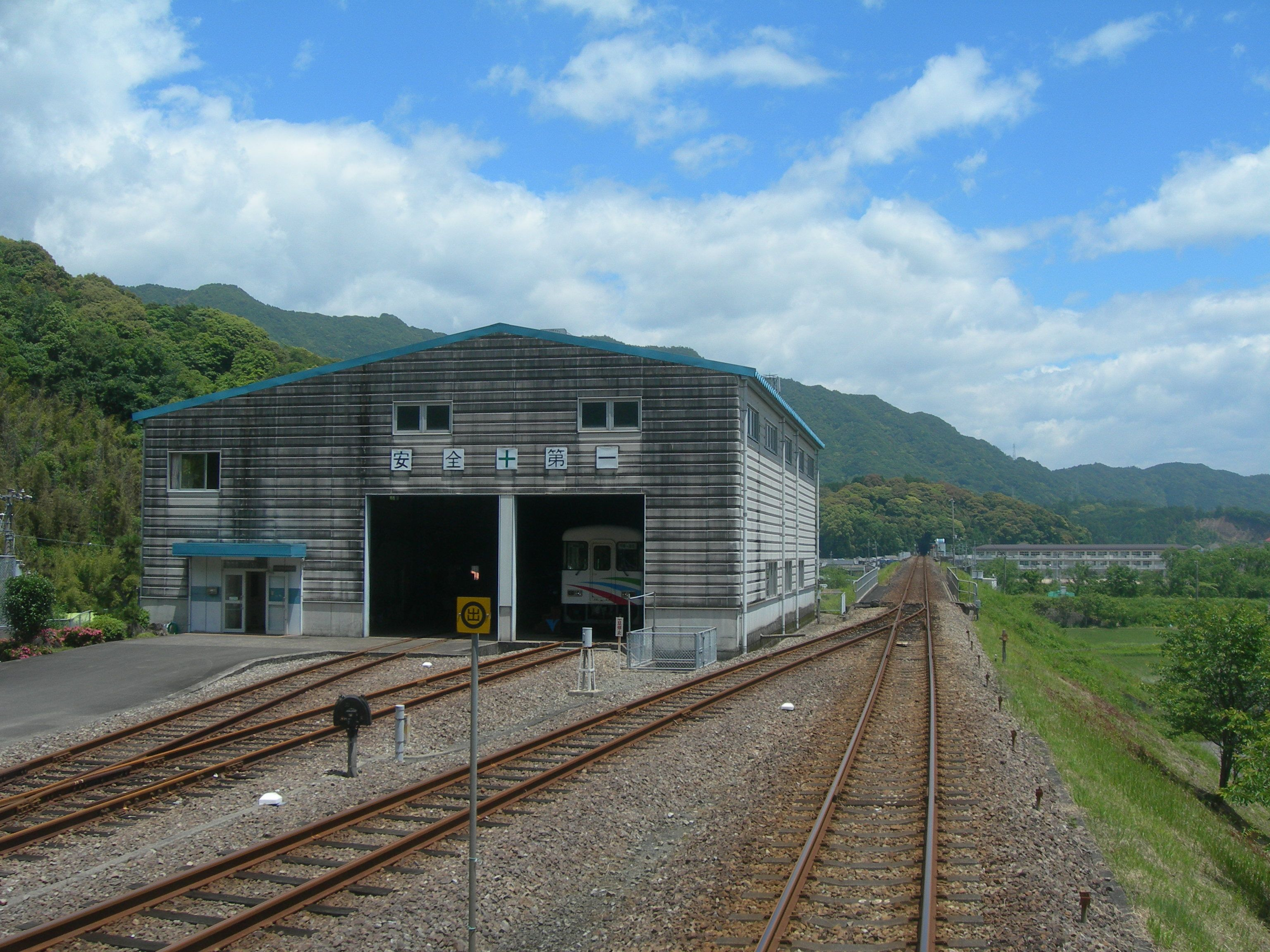
The Asa Kaigan train depot. The Shishikuui Station platform can be seen in the distance to the right.

== Adjacent stations ==
| « | Service | » |
Asatō Line
| Kaifu | Local | Kannoura |

== History ==
The station was opened on 26 March 1992 by the third sector Asa Kaigan Railway as the only intermediate station along the three station Asatō Line.

== Passenger statistics ==
In fiscal 2011, the station was used by an average of 38 passengers daily.

== Surrounding area ==
- Kaiyo Town Hall Shishikui Government Building

== See also ==
- List of railway stations in Japan
