= Kaifu =

Kaifu may refer to:

== Places ==
- Kaifu District, Changsha (开福区), Hunan, China
- Kaifu District, Tokushima (海部郡, -gun), Tokushima Prefecture, Japan
  - Kaifu, Tokushima (海部町, -cho), a town in Kaifu District, Tokushima

== Persons ==
- Norio Kaifu (海部 宣男, 1943–2019), Japanese astronomer
- Toshiki Kaifu (海部 俊樹, 1931–2022), 76th and 77th Prime Minister of Japan
