= Asa Line =

The Asa Line may refer to:

- Asa Kaigan Railway Asatō Line, a railway line connecting Tokushima Prefecture and Kōchi Prefecture, Japan
- Tosa Kuroshio Railway Asa Line, a railway line in Kōchi Prefecture, Japan

== See also ==
- Asa Line (railway project), an incomplete railway project that includes both of the lines above listed
