= Kainan, Tokushima =

Town in Tokushima prefecture, Japan

Kainan (海南町, Kainan-chō) was a town located in Kaifu District, Tokushima Prefecture, Japan.

As of 2003, the town had an estimated population of 5,967 and a density of 28.52 persons per km^{2}. The total area was 209.22 km^{2}.

On March 31, 2006, Kainan, along with the towns of Kaifu and Shishikui (all from Kaifu District), was merged to create the town of Kaiyō.
