= Shishikui, Tokushima =

Dissolved municipality in Tokushima prefecture, Japan

Shishikui (宍喰町, Shishikui-chō) was a town located in Kaifu District, Tokushima Prefecture, Japan.

As of 2003, the town had an estimated population of 3,550 and a density of 38.59 persons per km^{2}. The total area was 92.00 km^{2}.

On March 31, 2006, Shishikui, along with the towns of Kaifu and Kainan (all from Kaifu District), was merged to create the town of Kaiyō.
