= Asakawa Station =

Railway station in Kaiyō, Tokushima Prefecture, Japan

M26 Asakawa Station 浅川駅
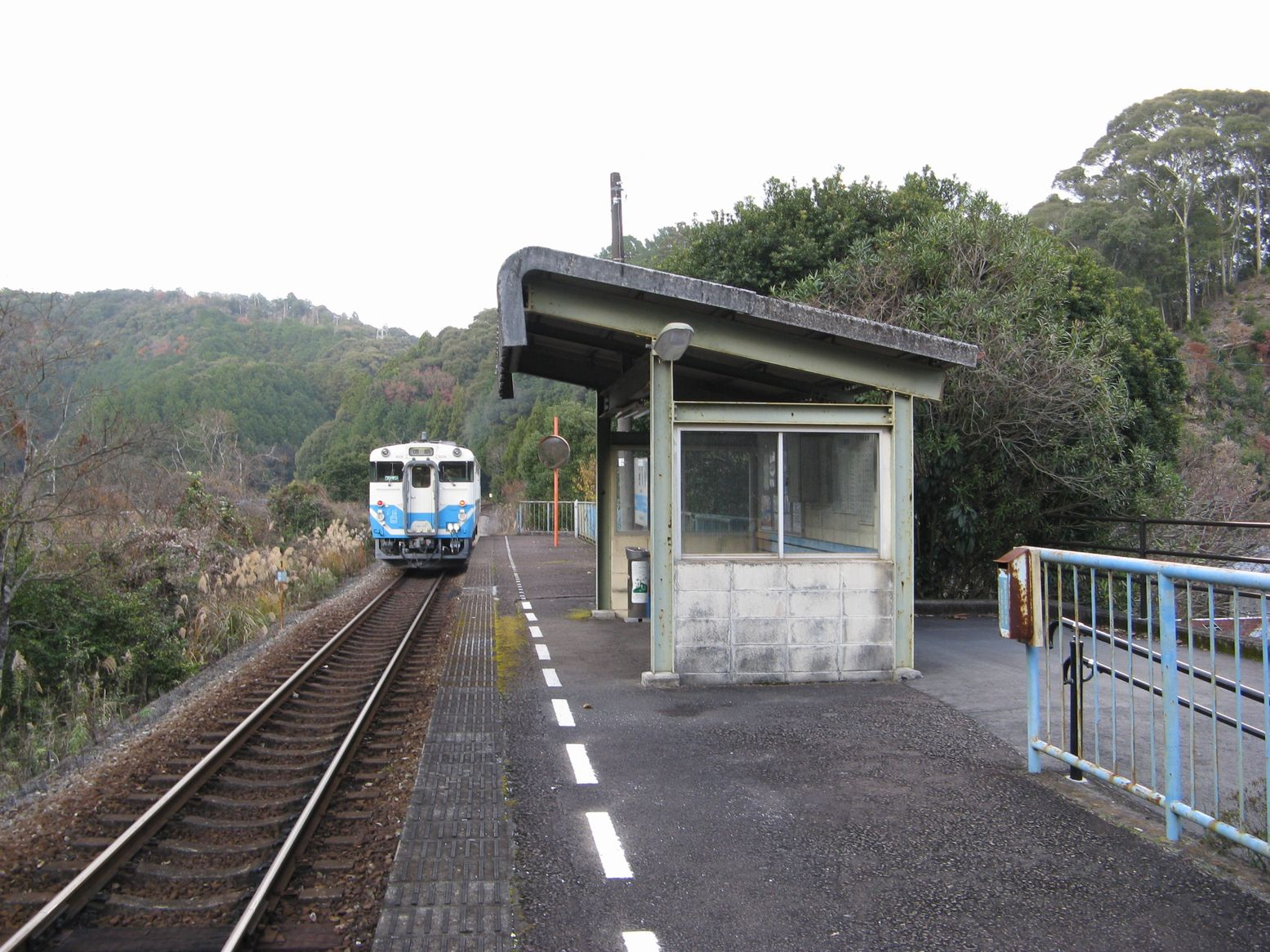
- Asakawa Station, December 2008

General information
- Location: Asakawa, Kaiyō Town, Kaifu District, Tokushima Prefecture 775-0101; Japan
- Coordinates: 33.6265°N 134.3588°E
- Operator: JR Shikoku
- Line: Mugi Line
- Distance: 75.4 km (46.9 mi) from Tokushima
- Platforms: 1 side platform
- Tracks: 1

Construction
- Structure type: At grade
- Parking: Available
- Cycle facilities: Bike shed
- Accessible: No - steep access road to platform

Other information
- Status: Unstaffed
- Station code: M26

History
- Opened: 1 October 1973; 52 years ago

Passengers
- FY2019: 8

Services
Preceding station	JR Shikoku	Following station
Sabase M25 towards Tokushima	Mugi Line	Awa-Kainan M27 Terminus
Location
- Location within Tokushima Prefecture Location within Japan

Asakawa Station (浅川駅, Asakawa-eki) is a passenger railway station located in the town of Kaiyō, Kaifu District, Tokushima Prefecture, Japan. It is operated by JR Shikoku and has the station number "M26".

== Lines ==
Asakawa Station is served by the Mugi Line and is located 75.4 km from the beginning of the line at Tokushima. All trains stop at this station.

== Layout ==
The station consists of a side platform serving a single track. There is no station building, only a shelter on the platform for passengers. Like the previous station, Sabase, an access road slopes up steeply from National Route 55, giving direct access to the platform. At the base of the access road is a parking area, a bike shed, a public phone callbox and a toilet building.

== History ==
Japanese National Railways (JNR) opened the station on 1 October 1973 as an intermediate station when the track of the Mugi Line was extended from Mugi to Kaifu. On 1 April 1987, with the privatization of JNR, control of the station passed to JR Shikoku.

== Passenger statistics ==
In fiscal 2019, the station was used by an average of 8 passengers daily.

== Surrounding area ==
- Kaiyo Town Hall Asakawa Branch Office
- Japan National Route 55

== See also ==
- List of railway stations in Japan
