= List of places of scenic beauty of Japan (Kōchi) =

This list is of the places of scenic beauty of Japan located within the Prefecture of Kōchi.

== National Places of Scenic Beauty ==
As of 1 September 2019, three Places have been designated at a national level.

Site	Municipality	Comments	Image	Coordinates	Type	Ref.
Cape Muroto 室戸岬; Muroto-misaki	Muroto	in Muroto-Anan Kaigan Quasi-National Park		33°15′12″N 134°10′39″E	8	
Chikurin-ji Gardens 竹林寺庭園; Chikurinji teien	Kōchi	Temple 31 on the Shikoku pilgrimage		33°32′48″N 133°34′38″E	1	
Irino Matsubara 入野松原; Irino-matsubara	Kuroshio			33°01′18″N 133°00′48″E	3, 8	

== Prefectural Places of Scenic Beauty ==
As of 1 May 2019, seven Places have been designated at a prefectural level.

Site	Municipality	Comments	Image	Coordinates	Type	Ref.
Tatsukushi 竜串; Tatsukushi	Tosashimizu			32°47′10″N 132°51′57″E		
Ōdaru Falls 大樽の滝; Ōdaru-no-taki	Ochi			33°31′17″N 133°14′34″E		
Kotogahama Matsubara 琴ヶ浜松原; Kotogahama-matsubara	Geisei			33°31′03″N 133°48′14″E		
Seigen-ji Gardens 青源寺庭園; Seigenji teien	Sakawa			33°29′50″N 133°17′17″E		
Jōdai-ji Gardens 乗台寺庭園; Jōdaiji teien	Sakawa			33°30′10″N 133°17′05″E		
Todoro Falls 轟の滝; Todoro-no-taki	Kami			33°42′43″N 133°50′03″E		
Nagasawa Falls 長沢の滝; Nagasawa-no-taki	Tsuno, Yusuhara			33°25′51″N 132°59′44″E		

== Municipal Places of Scenic Beauty ==
As of 1 May 2019, thirteen Places have been designated at a municipal level.

== See also ==
- Cultural Properties of Japan
- List of historic sites of Japan (Kōchi)
- List of parks and gardens of Kōchi Prefecture
