= Tōyō, Kōchi =

Tōyō 東洋町
- Town
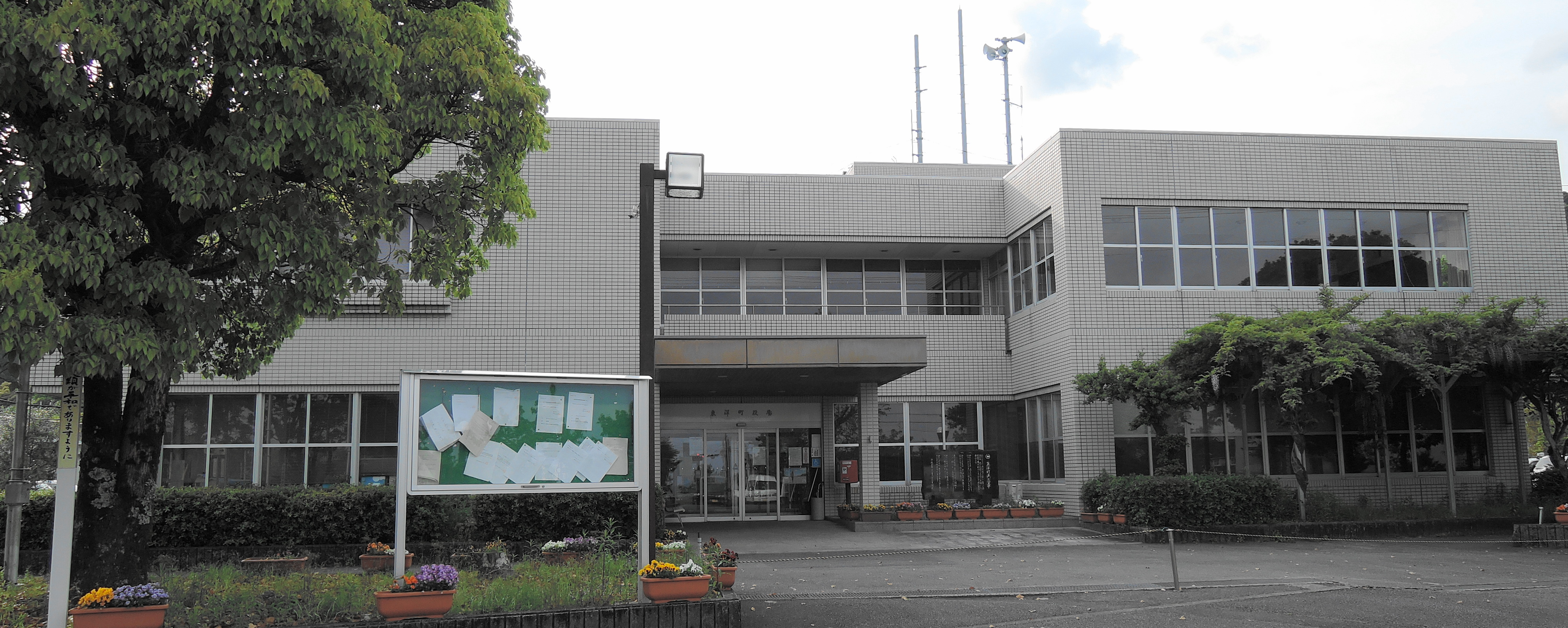
- Toyo town hall

- Flag Chapter
- Location of Tōyō in Kōchi Prefecture

- Location in Japan
- Coordinates: 33°32′N 134°17′E
- Country: Japan
- Region: Shikoku
- Prefecture: Kōchi
- District: Aki

Area
  - Total: 74.06 km^{2} (28.59 sq mi)

Population (February 28, 2022)
  - Total: 2,226
  - Density: 30.06/km^{2} (77.85/sq mi)
- Time zone: UTC+09:00 (JST)
- City hall address: 758-3 Ikumi, Tōyō-chō, Aki-gun, Kōchi-ken 781-7414
- Website: Official website

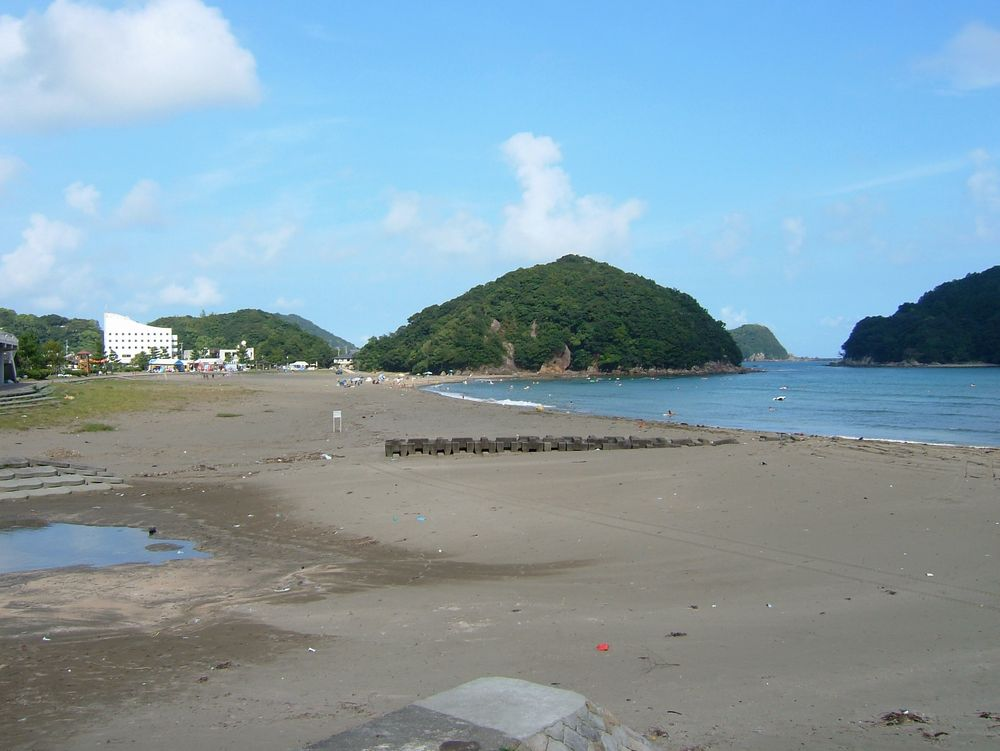
Shirahama Beach

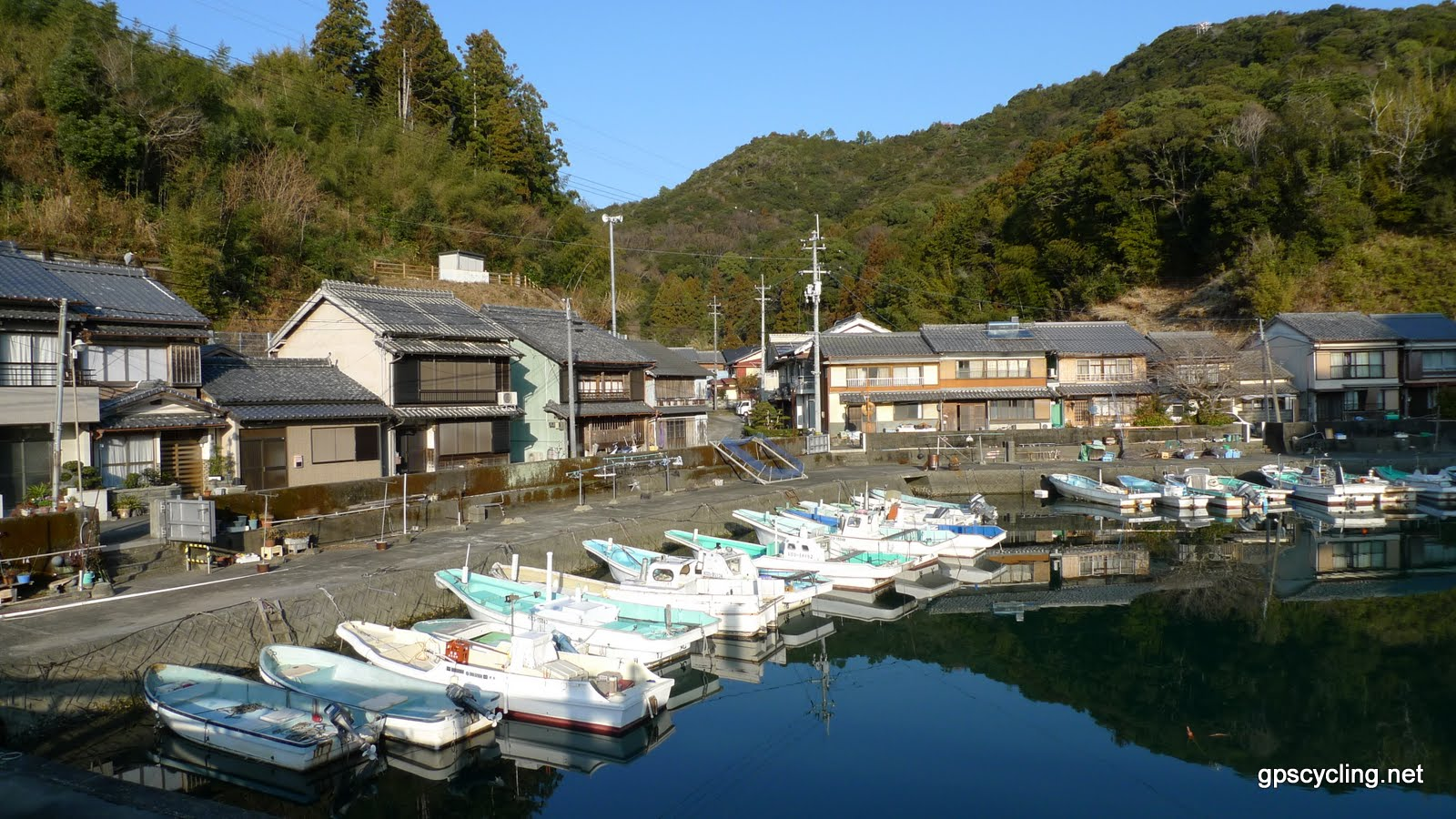
Kannoura fishing port

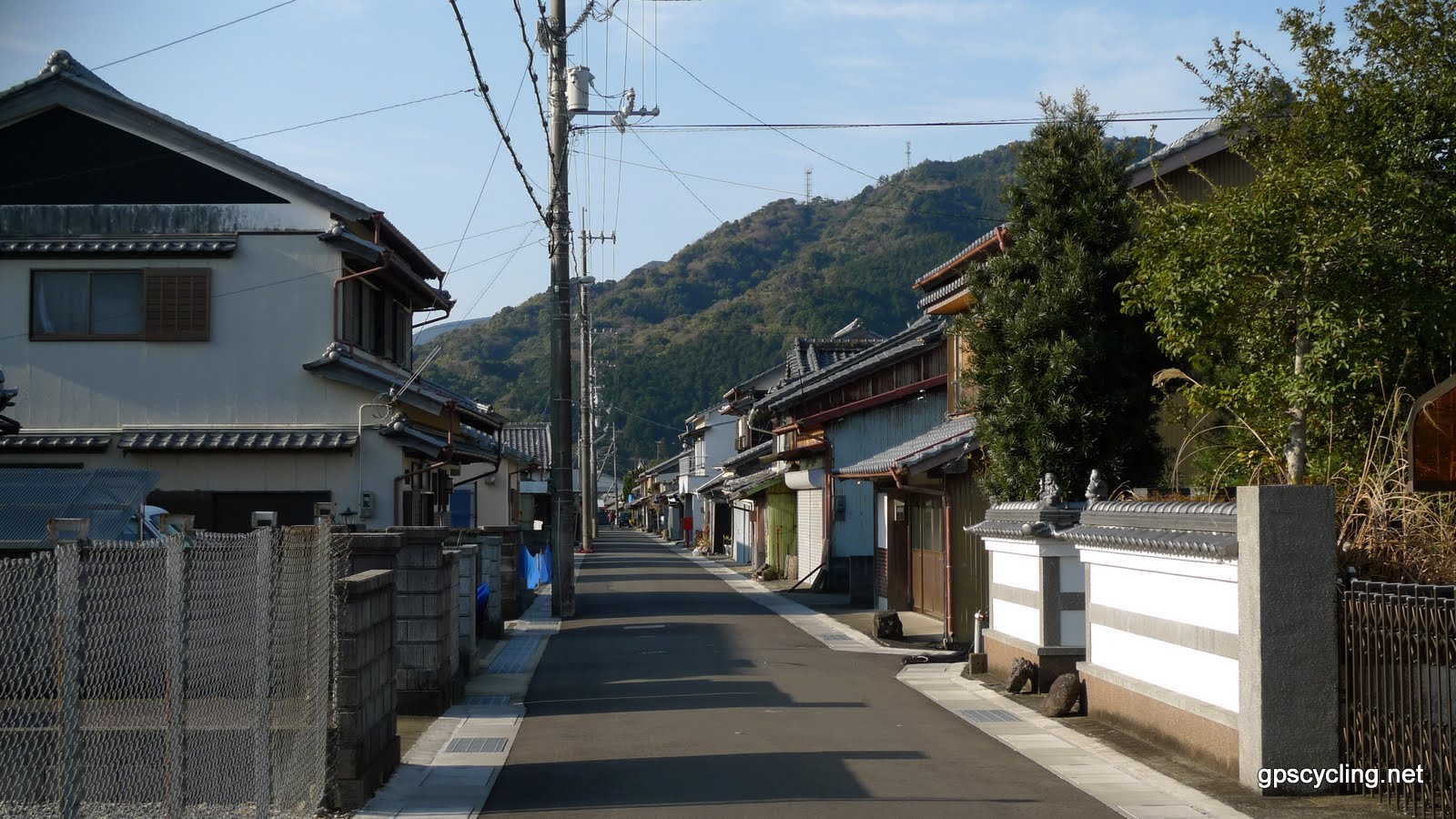
Street in None

Tōyō (東洋町, Tōyō-chō) is a town located in Aki District, Kōchi Prefecture, Japan. As of 28 February 2022, the town had an estimated population of 2,226 in 1363 households and a population density of 30 persons per km^{2}. The total area of the town is 74.06 square kilometres (28.59 sq mi).

== Geography ==
Tōyō is located in northeastern tip of Kōchi Prefecture on the island of Shikoku. It is situated on a mountainous area of the ria coast of the Pacific Ocean, with the main urban area being strip of hamlets along the coastal highway. Much of the town is within the borders of the Muroto-Anan Kaigan Quasi-National Park.

=== Neighbouring municipalities ===
Kōchi Prefecture

- Kitagawa
- Muroto

Tokushima Prefecture

- Kaiyō

=== Climate ===
Tōyō has a humid subtropical climate (Köppen climate classification Cfa) with hot summers and cool winters. Precipitation is high, but there is a pronounced difference between the wetter summers and drier winters.

== Demographics ==
Per Japanese census data, the population of Tōyō has decreased rapidly since the 1960s.

Historical population
Year	Pop.	±%
1920	6,263	—
1930	6,757	+7.9%
1940	6,827	+1.0%
1950	8,521	+24.8%
1960	8,102	−4.9%
1970	5,812	−28.3%
1980	4,943	−15.0%
1990	4,413	−10.7%
2000	3,744	−15.2%
2010	2,947	−21.3%
2020	2,194	−25.6%

== History ==
As with all of Kōchi Prefecture, the area of Tōyō was part of ancient Tosa Province. The name of Aki District appears in Nara period . During the Edo period, the area was part of the holdings of Tosa Domain ruled by the Yamauchi clan from their seat at Kōchi Castle. The villages of Kannoura (甲浦村) and None (野根村) were established with the creation of the modern municipalities system on October 1, 1889. Kannoura was raised to town status on April 1, 1916, followed by None on February 11, 1938. The two towns merged on July 1, 1959 to form the town of Tōyō.

In 2007, Yasuoki Tashima, the former mayor of the town, brought national and worldwide attention when he applied to host Japan's high level nuclear waste repository in Tōyō without the knowledge or approval of the town assembly. The plan was met with resistance from the town council, the governors of both and Kōchi and Tokushima Prefecture, as well as outrage by local residents. He lost a subsequent election and resigned.

== Government ==
Tōyō has a mayor-council form of government with a directly elected mayor and a unicameral town council of nine members. Tōyō, together with the city of Muroto, contributes one member to the Kōchi Prefectural Assembly. In terms of national politics, the town is part of Kōchi 1st district of the lower house of the Diet of Japan.

== Economy ==
In addition to the commercial fishery industry, Tōyō's economy is centered on forestry and fruit tree cultivation. In the past, bonito fishing and whaling were important, but now the main fishing industry is coastal fishing. The upper reaches of the None River are rainy areas and are noted for wood production.

== Education ==
Tōyō has two public elementary schools and two public middle schools operated by the town government. The town does not have a high school.

== Transportation ==
=== Railway ===
The Asa Kaigan Railway's Asatō Line passed through the town, but its terminus, Kannoura Station closed in 2020 when the line was converted from rail to Dual-mode vehicle operations.

=== Highways ===
- National Route 55
- National Route 193

== Local attractions ==
- Muroto-Anan Kaigan Quasi-National Park
