= Kaiyō, Tokushima =

Kaiyō 海陽町
- Town
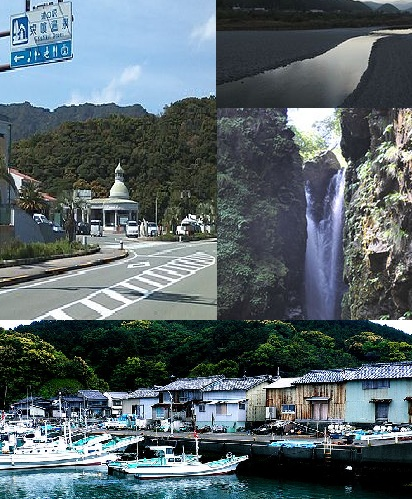
Roadside Station Shishikui Onsen	Kaifu River
	Todoroki Falls
Kaifu Port
- Flag Seal
- Interactive map of Kaiyō
- Location within Japan
- Coordinates: 33°36′N 134°21′E
- Country: Japan
- Region: Shikoku
- Prefecture: Tokushima
- District: Kaifu

Government
  - Mayor: Shigeki Miura

Area
  - Total: 327.65 km^{2} (126.51 sq mi)

Population (May 1, 2022)
  - Total: 8,699
  - Density: 26.55/km^{2} (68.76/sq mi)
- Climate: Cfa
- City hall address: 128 Kaminakasu, Ozato, Kaiyo-cho, Kaifu-gun, Tokushima-ken 775-0203
- Website: Official website
- Symbols
- Flower: Rhododendron indicum
- Tree: Pine

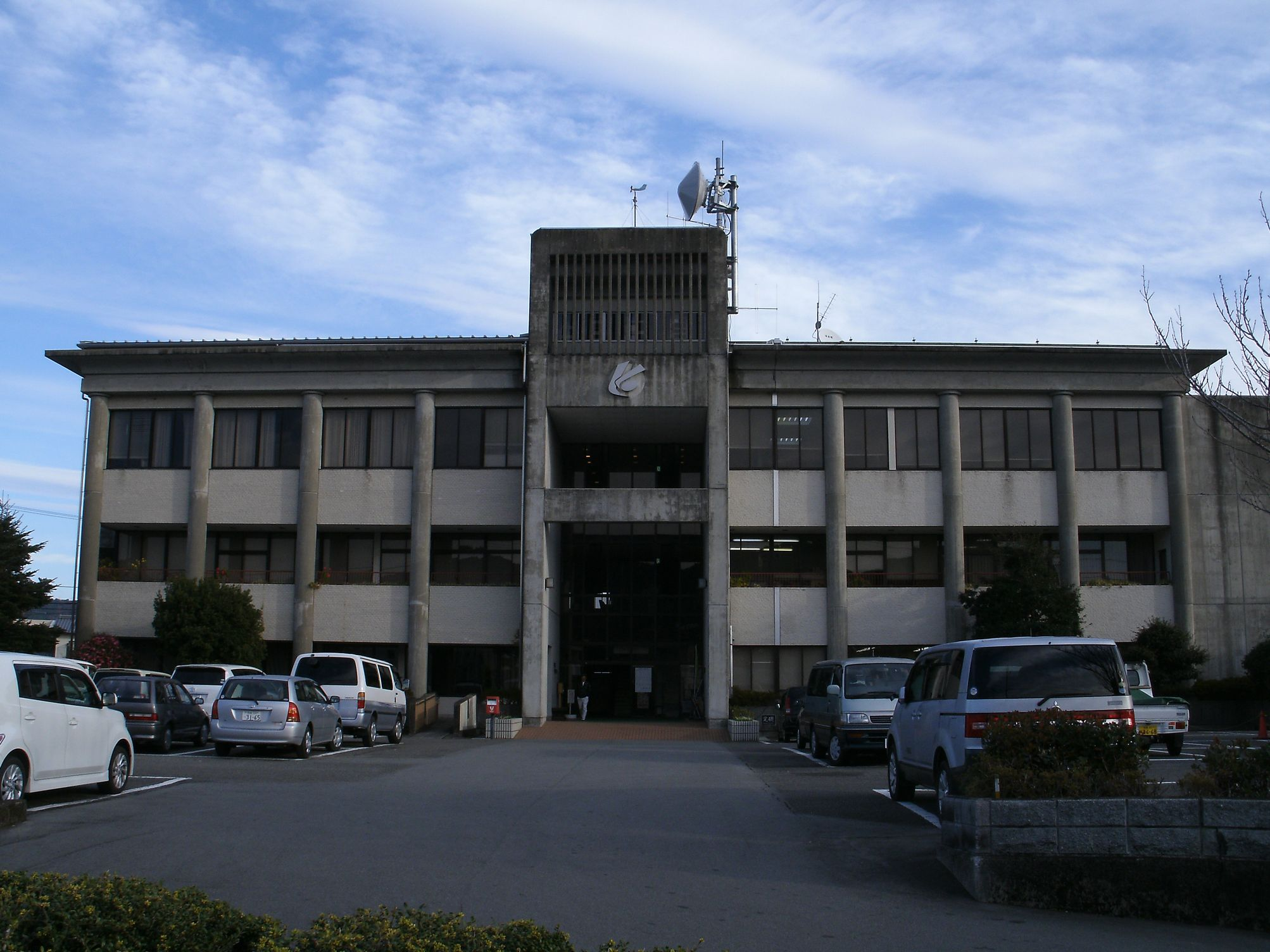
Kaiyō Town Office

Kaiyō (海陽町, Kaiyō-chō) is a town located in Kaifu District, Tokushima Prefecture, Japan. As of 1 May 2022, the town had an estimated population of 8,699 in 4488 households and a population density of 27 persons per km^{2}. The total area of the town is 327.65 square kilometres (126.51 sq mi).

== Geography ==
Kaiyō is located in the southeastern corner of Tokushima Prefecture on the island of Shikoku. It is bordered by the Kii Channel to the southeast and Kochi Prefecture to the southwest. Parts of the town are within the borders of the Chūbu Sankei Prefectural Natural Park.

=== Neighbouring municipalities ===
Kōchi Prefecture

- Kitagawa
- Tōyō
- Umaji

Tokushima Prefecture

- Minami
- Mugi
- Naka

=== Climate ===
Kaiyō has a humid subtropical climate (Köppen climate classification Cfa) with hot summers and cool winters. Precipitation is high, but there is a pronounced difference between the wetter summers and drier winters. The average annual temperature in Kaiyō is 16.5 °C (61.7 °F). The average annual rainfall is 3,195.9 mm (125.82 in) with June as the wettest month. The temperatures are highest on average in August, at around 27.4 °C (81.3 °F), and lowest in January, at around 5.9 °C (42.6 °F). The highest temperature ever recorded in Kaiyō was 36.9 °C (98.4 °F) on 23 August 2013; the coldest temperature ever recorded was −7.3 °C (18.9 °F) on 9 January 2021.

Climate data for Kaiyō (2009−2020 normals, extremes 2009−present)
Month	Jan	Feb	Mar	Apr	May	Jun	Jul	Aug	Sep	Oct	Nov	Dec	Year
Record high °C (°F)	20.4 (68.7)	24.3 (75.7)	25.7 (78.3)	28.8 (83.8)	30.2 (86.4)	33.7 (92.7)	36.0 (96.8)	36.9 (98.4)	35.8 (96.4)	31.5 (88.7)	27.4 (81.3)	24.3 (75.7)	36.9 (98.4)
Mean daily maximum °C (°F)	12.0 (53.6)	12.7 (54.9)	15.6 (60.1)	19.7 (67.5)	23.9 (75.0)	26.1 (79.0)	30.0 (86.0)	31.8 (89.2)	28.8 (83.8)	24.4 (75.9)	19.4 (66.9)	14.3 (57.7)	21.6 (70.8)
Daily mean °C (°F)	5.9 (42.6)	7.2 (45.0)	10.3 (50.5)	14.6 (58.3)	19.0 (66.2)	22.2 (72.0)	26.1 (79.0)	27.4 (81.3)	24.2 (75.6)	19.4 (66.9)	13.8 (56.8)	8.2 (46.8)	16.5 (61.7)
Mean daily minimum °C (°F)	0.2 (32.4)	1.7 (35.1)	4.7 (40.5)	9.2 (48.6)	14.0 (57.2)	18.8 (65.8)	22.9 (73.2)	23.7 (74.7)	20.3 (68.5)	14.8 (58.6)	8.6 (47.5)	2.6 (36.7)	11.8 (53.2)
Record low °C (°F)	−7.3 (18.9)	−6.7 (19.9)	−2.7 (27.1)	0.0 (32.0)	5.2 (41.4)	11.8 (53.2)	17.7 (63.9)	17.1 (62.8)	11.5 (52.7)	5.9 (42.6)	−0.4 (31.3)	−4.2 (24.4)	−7.3 (18.9)
Average precipitation mm (inches)	77.8 (3.06)	133.8 (5.27)	186.7 (7.35)	286.9 (11.30)	250.2 (9.85)	453.0 (17.83)	433.0 (17.05)	311.8 (12.28)	402.8 (15.86)	341.3 (13.44)	152.7 (6.01)	117.3 (4.62)	3,195.9 (125.82)
Average precipitation days (≥ 1.0 mm)	4.6	6.9	9.2	9.8	9.2	14.4	14.3	12.0	13.1	10.0	7.3	5.4	116.2
Mean monthly sunshine hours	202.7	172.6	199.5	201.4	215.8	137.1	169.2	223.0	154.4	165.8	171.4	195.8	2,209.8
Source: Japan Meteorological Agency

== Demographics ==
Per Japanese census data, the population of Kaiyō in 2020 is 8,358 people. Kaiyō has been conducting censuses since 1920.

Historical population
Year	Pop.	±%
1920	16,287	—
1925	16,567	+1.7%
1930	16,222	−2.1%
1935	16,195	−0.2%
1940	16,205	+0.1%
1945	20,348	+25.6%
1950	20,591	+1.2%
1955	20,467	−0.6%
1960	19,485	−4.8%
1965	17,720	−9.1%
1970	15,867	−10.5%
1975	14,909	−6.0%
1980	14,397	−3.4%
1985	13,915	−3.3%
1990	12,949	−6.9%
1995	12,399	−4.2%
2000	12,104	−2.4%
2005	11,507	−4.9%
2010	10,450	−9.2%
2015	9,283	−11.2%
2020	8,358	−10.0%
Kaiyō population statistics

== History ==
As with all of Tokushima Prefecture, the area of Kaiyō was part of ancient Awa Province. It was noted for ocean-borne shipping, especially of timber, from Tosa Province to the Kinai region . During the Edo period, the area was part of the holdings of Tokushima Domain ruled by the Hachisuka clan from their seat at Tokushima Castle. The area was divided into villages within Kaifu District, Tokushima with the creation of the modern municipalities system on October 1, 1889.

The town of Kaiyō was founded on March 31, 2006, from the merger of the towns of Kaifu, Kainan, and Shishikui, all from Kaifu District.

== Government ==
Kaiyō has a mayor-council form of government with a directly elected mayor and a unicameral town council of 14 members. Kaiyō, together with the other municipalities of Kaifu District, contributes two members to the Tokushima Prefectural Assembly. In terms of national politics, the town is part of Tokushima 1st district of the lower house of the Diet of Japan.

== Economy ==
Kaiyō has a mixed economy of agriculture and commercial fishing.

== Education ==
Kaiyō has three public elementary schools and two public middle schools operated by the town government and one public high school operated by the Tokushima Prefectural Department of Education.

== Transportation ==
=== Railway ===
Shikoku Railway Company – Mugi Line

- Sabase - Asakawa - Awa-Kainan

Asa Kaigan Railway – Asatō Line

- Kaifu - Shishikui

=== Highways ===
- National Route 55
- National Route 193

== Local attractions ==
- Chūbu Sankei Prefectural Natural Park

== Noted people from Kaiyō ==
- Toshiharu Ueda, baseball player and coach
