= Awa-Kainan Station =

Railway station in Kaiyō, Tokushima Prefecture, Japan

M27 Awa-Kainan Station 阿波海南駅
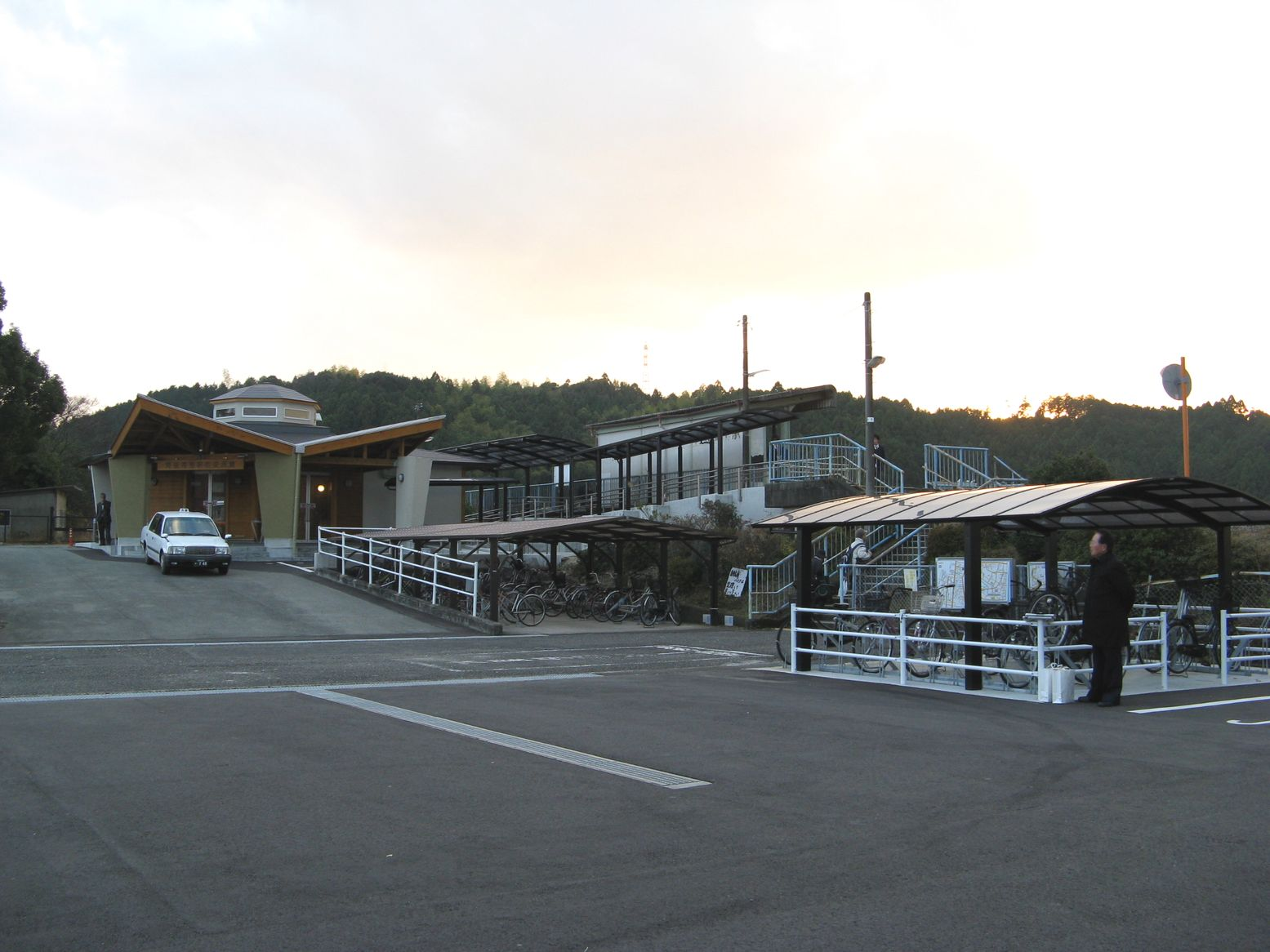
- Awa-Kainan Station, December 2008

General information
- Location: Shihohara, Kaiyō Town, Kaifu District; Tokushima Prefecture 775-0202; Japan
- Coordinates: 33.6062°N 134.3509°E
- Operator: JR Shikoku; ■ Asa Seaside Railway
- Lines: Mugi Line; ■ Asato Line
- Distance: 77.8 km (48.3 mi) from Tokushima
- Platforms: 1 (1 side platform)
- Tracks: 1

Construction
- Structure type: At grade
- Parking: Available
- Cycle facilities: Bike shed
- Accessible: Yes - ramp leads to platform

Other information
- Status: Unstaffed
- Station code: M27

History
- Opened: 1 October 1973; 52 years ago

Passengers
- FY2019 (JR only): 176

Services
Preceding station	JR Shikoku	Following station
Asakawa M26 towards Tokushima	Mugi Line	Terminus
Location
- Location within Tokushima Prefecture Location within Japan

Awa-Kainan Station (阿波海南駅, Awa-Kainan-eki) is a junction passenger railway station located in the town of Kaiyō, Kaifu District, Tokushima Prefecture, Japan. It is operated jointly by JR Shikoku and the third-sector Asa Seaside Railway and has the station number "M27".

== Lines ==
Awa-Kainan Station is the southern terminus of the Mugi Line and is located 77.8 km from the opposing terminus of the line at Tokushima. Prior to its discontinuation in March 2025, Muroto services ran via through service, past Mugi, to this station. As a result, all trains stop at this station.

Since 1 November 2020, it has served as the northern terminus of the 10.0 kilometer Asato Line to Kannoura Station.

== Layout ==
The station, which is unstaffed, consists of a side platform serving a single track. There is no station building but a community interaction centre set up by the local municipal authorities is linked to the platform and serves as a waiting room. There is, additionally, a weather shelter on the platform. Access to the platform is by means of a flight of steps from the station forecourt or a ramp from the community interaction centre. A bike shed is provided near the base of the steps.

A DMV departs from and arrives at a bus stop in front of this station.

=== DMV ===
Since 1 November 2020, this station has been transferred to Asa Seaside Railway and is jointly managed by Asa Seaside Railway and JR Shikoku with the commencement of DMV operations in 2021. The interconnection between JR Shikoku and Asa Seaside Railway has been disconnected due to the construction of the DMV. Asa Seaside Railway Awa-Kainan Station will be changed to a signal station, so trains depart from and arrive at bus stop near the station.

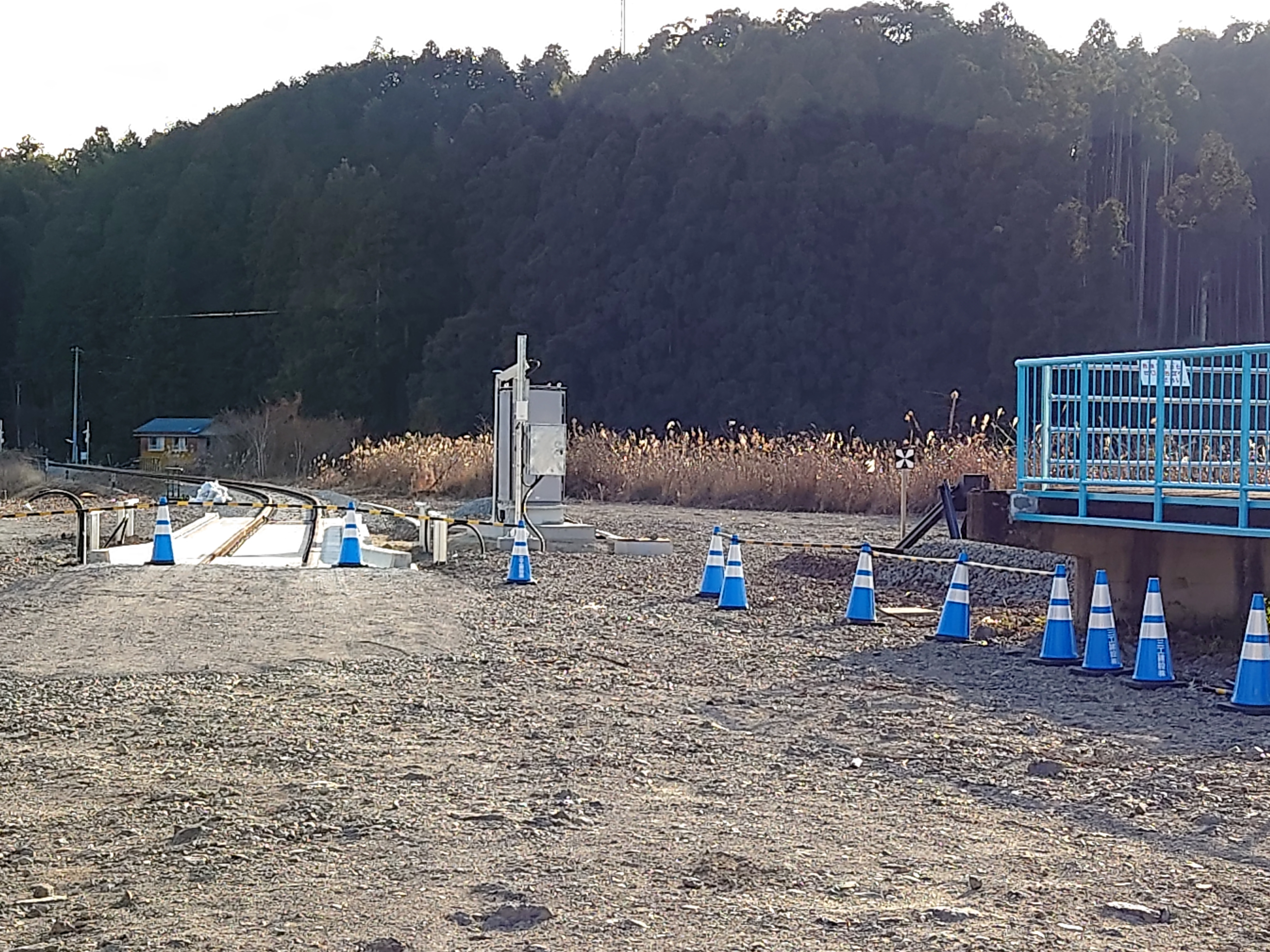
Changeover facilities for DMV of Asa Seaside Railway and a platform and the end of JR Mugi Line

Mode change of a "dual-mode vehicle" at Awa Kainan Station

== Adjacent stations ==
«	Service	»
Asato Line
From Awa-Kainan Bunkamura	Local	Kaifu

== History ==
Japanese National Railways (JNR) opened the station on 1 October 1973 as an intermediate station when the track of the Mugi Line was extended from Mugi to Kaifu. On 1 April 1987, with the privatization of JNR, control of the station passed to JR Shikoku. And, since 1 November 2020, the station has been transferred to Asa Seaside Railway.

== Passenger statistics ==
In fiscal 2019, the station was used by an average of 176 passengers daily.

== Surrounding area ==
- Kaiyo Town Hall
- Kaiyo Municipal Library
- Kaiyo Municipal Kainan Hospital

== See also ==
- List of railway stations in Japan
