= Kaifu Station =

Railway station in Kaiyō, Tokushima Prefecture, Japan

Kaifu Station 海部駅
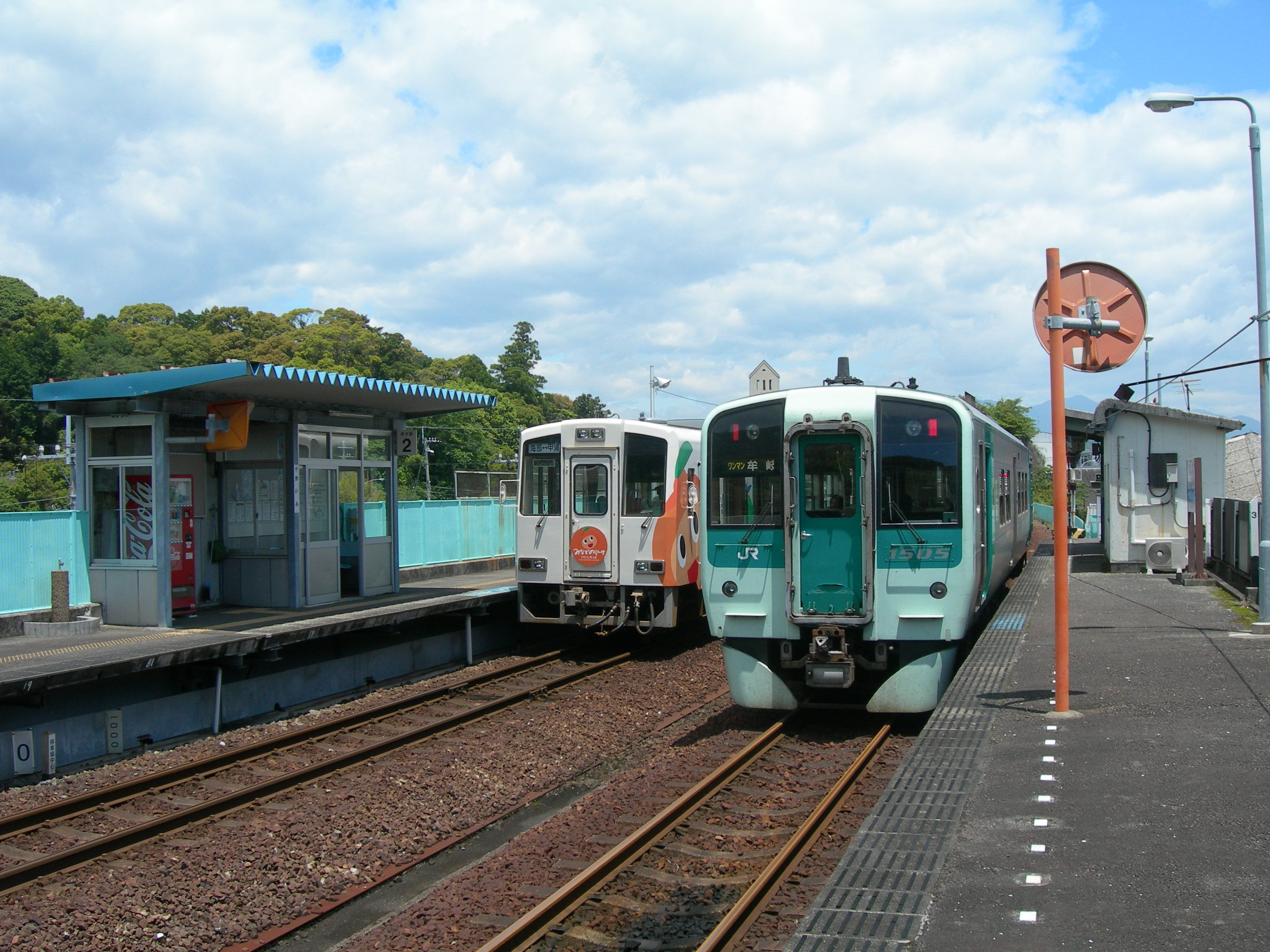
- Kaifu Station in May 2010

General information
- Location: Okuura, Kaiyō-cho, Kaifu-gun, Tokushima-ken 775-0302; Japan
- Coordinates: 33°35′36″N 134°21′7″E
- Operator: Asa Kaigan Railway
- Line: ■ Asatō Line
- Distance: 1.5 km from Awa-Kainan (start of the Asato Line)
- Platforms: 2 side platforms
- Tracks: 2

Construction
- Structure type: Elevated
- Cycle facilities: Bike shed

Other information
- Status: Unstaffed
- Station code: AK28
- Website: Official website (Asa Kaigan Railway)

History
- Opened: 1 October 1973
Location
- Location within Tokushima Prefecture Location within Japan

Kaifu Station (海部駅, Kaifu-eki) is a passenger railway station located in the town of Kaiyō, Kaifu District, Tokushima Prefecture, Japan. It is operated by the third-sector Asa Seaside Railway and bears the station number "AK28".

== Lines ==
Kaifu Station is served by the Asato Line and located 1.5 km from the terminus of the line at Awa-Kainan Station. The JR Mugi Line hasn't interconnected with Asa Seaside Railway since 2021.

== Layout ==
The station, which is unstaffed, consists of two side platforms serving two tracks on an elevated structure. There is no station building and the station is unstaffed. Access to the platforms is by means of a flight of steps and the two platforms are linked by a level crossing across the tracks. A bike shed is provided at the base of the elevated structure.

Just to the north of the station, trains pass through the Chōnai Tunnel (町内トンネル, Chōnai ton'neru), a short 44 meters (144 ft) tunnel original driven through a hill. Land development had led to the entire hill being removed but the tunnel structure was left intact.

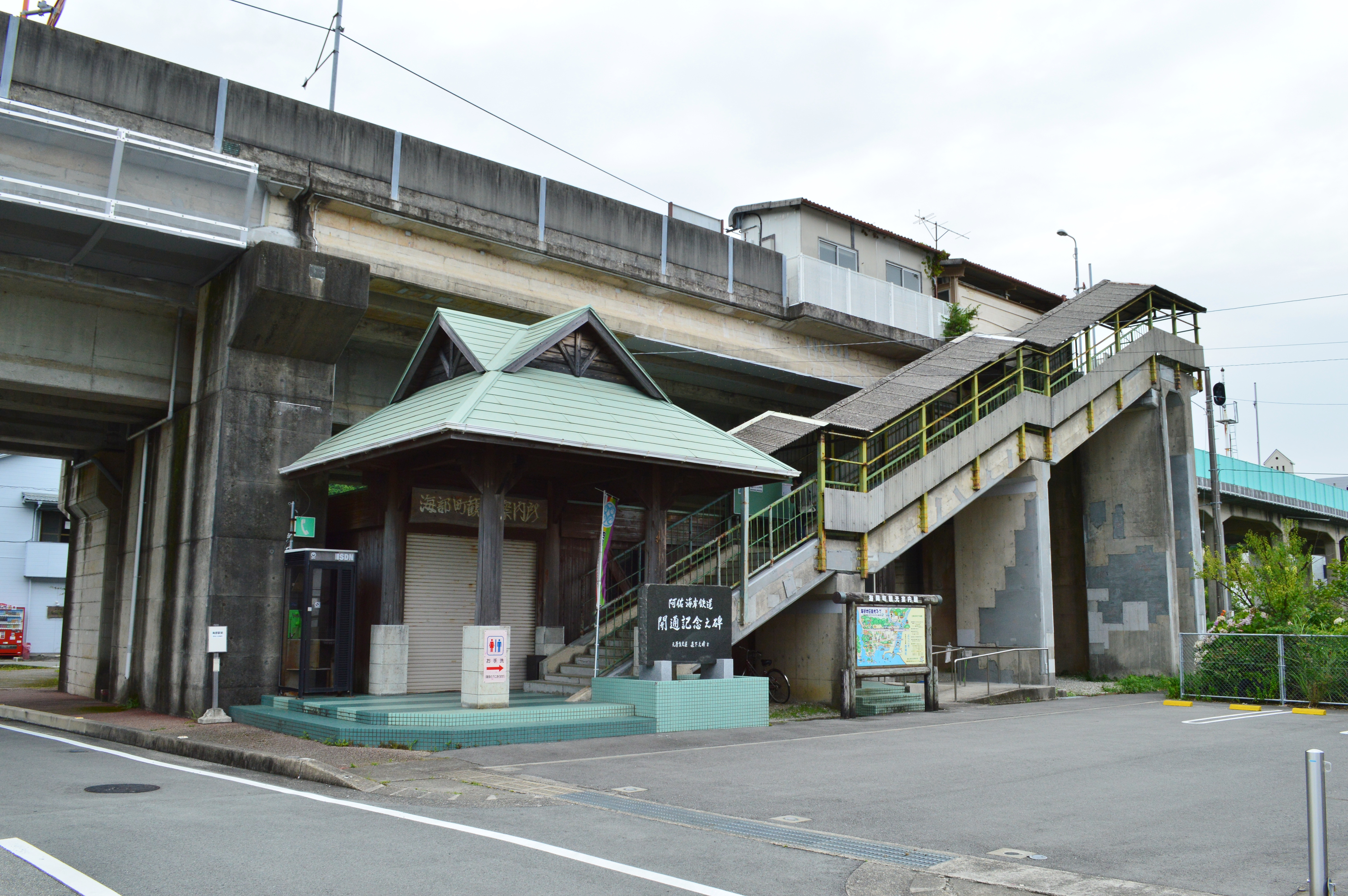
Station entrance. Note steps leading up to the platform. The black plaque commemorates the opening of the Asatō Line. The sign above the roller shutters says "Kaifu Town Tourism Information Centre" - now replaced by a community interaction centre.

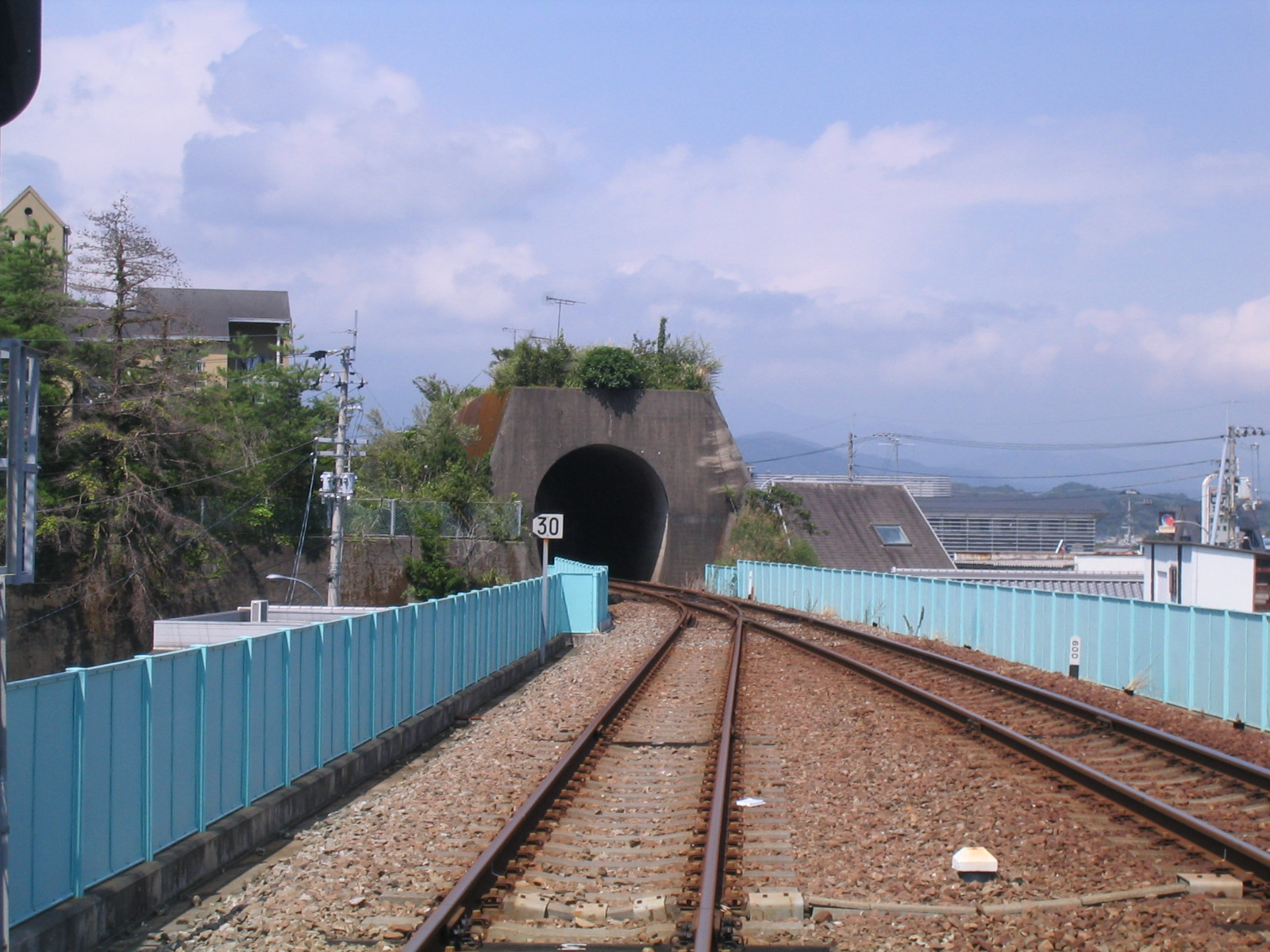
A view of the station tracks looking in the direction of Tokushima. Note the Chōnai Tunnel. The hill it used to punch through has now been removed for land development

== Adjacent stations ==
«	Service	»
Asa Seaside Railway
Asato Line
Awa-Kainan	Local	Shishikui

== History ==
Japanese National Railways (JNR) opened Kaifu Station on 1 October 1973 as an intermediate station when the track of the Mugi Line was extended from Mugi to Kaifu. On 1 April 1987, with the privatization of JNR, control of the station passed to JR Shikoku. On 26 March 1992, the third sector Asa Kaigan Railway completing the extension of the track southwards to Kannoura and the Asatō Line began operations with Kaifu as the northern terminus.

On 23 December 2015, a local community group in Kaiyō opened a community interaction centre underneath the elevated structure of the station to promote interaction between senior citizens and children in the town. It was located in the premises of a former town tourism information centre which had been built there in 1995.

Since 1 November 2020, the station has been transferred to Asa Seaside Railway from JR Shikoku as DMV is commenced operations from summer 2021.

== Surrounding area ==
- Kaiyo Town Hall Kaifu Government Building

== See also ==
- List of railway stations in Japan
