= Kaifu, Tokushima =

Dissolved municipality in Tokushima prefecture, Japan

Kaifu (海部町, Kaifu-chō) was a town located in Kaifu District, Tokushima, Japan.

As of 2003, the town had an estimated population of 2,423 and a density of 91.92 persons per km^{2}. The total area was 26.36 km^{2}.

On March 31, 2006, Kaifu, with the towns of Kainan and Shishikui (all from Kaifu District), was merged to create the town of Kaiyō.
