= Asatō Line =

Japanese regional dual-mode road-rail service

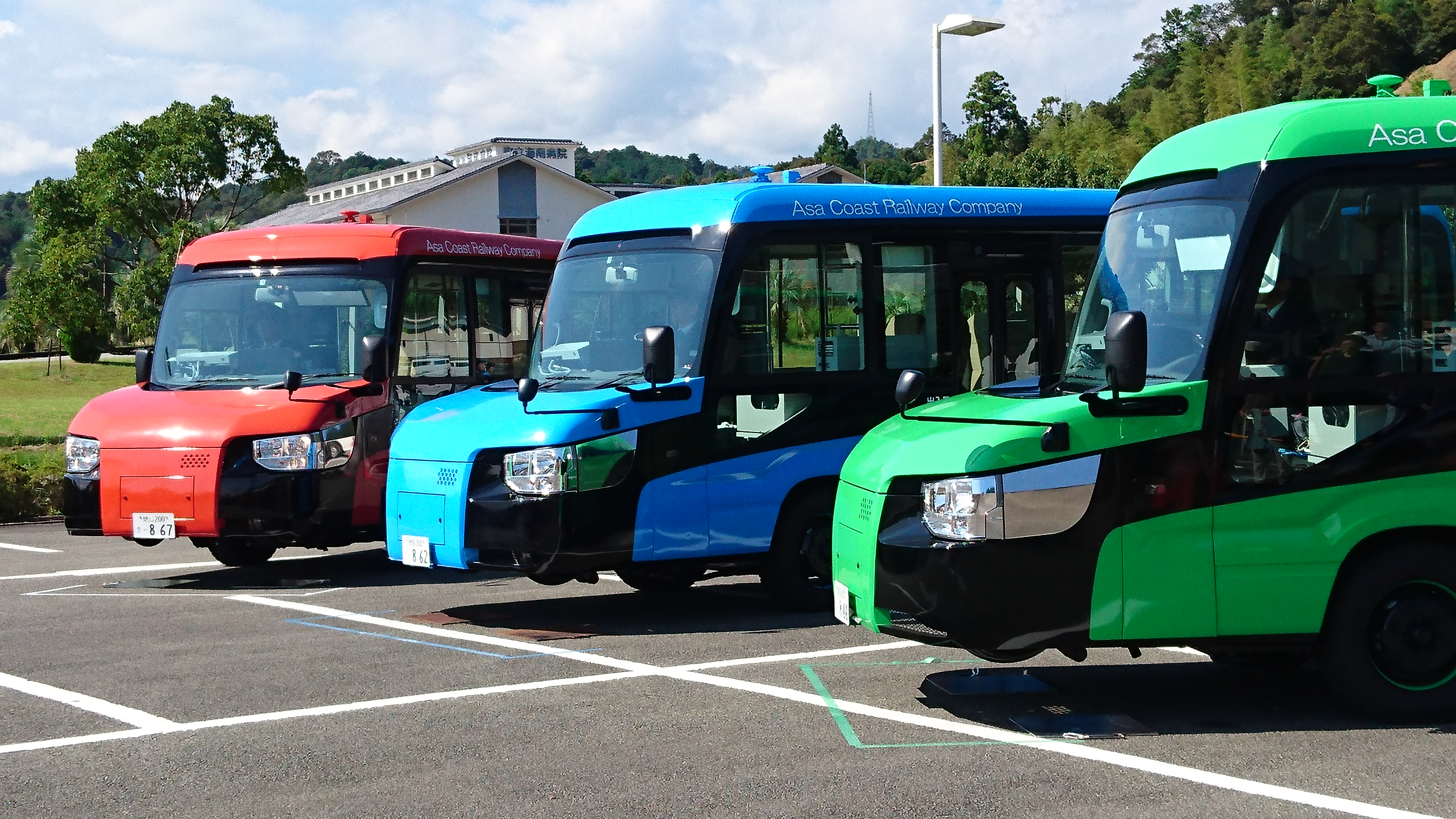
- Dual-mode vehicles operated on the Asato Line since 2021, based on Toyota Coaster

Overview
- Native name: 阿佐東線
- Status: Operational
- Owner: Asa Coast Railway Company
- Locale: Tokushima Prefecture and Kochi Prefecture
- Termini: Awa-Kainan; Kannoura
- Stations: 4 (railway)
- Website: https://asatetu.com/

Service
- Type: Regional rail Bus
- Operator(s): Asa Coast Railway Company
- Rolling stock: DMV93

History
- Opened: 26 March 1992

Technical
- Line length: 10.0 km (6.2 mi)
- Number of tracks: Entire line single tracked
- Character: Rural
- Track gauge: 1,067 mm (3 ft 6 in)
- Electrification: None
- Operating speed: 85 km/h (53 mph)

The Asatō Line (阿佐東線, Asatō-sen; lit. 'Asa East Line') is a Japanese railway line connecting Kaifu Station, Kaiyō and Kannoura Station, Tōyō in Tokushima and Kōchi Prefectures. Together with JR Shikoku's Mugi Line, it has the official nickname Awa Muroto Seaside Line (阿波室戸シーサイドライン, Awa Muroto Shīsaido Rain).

This is the only railway line operated by the third-sector Asa Coast Railway Company (阿佐海岸鉄道株式会社, Asa Kaigan Tetsudō kabushiki-gaisha). The company's name is abbreviated to the portmanteau Asatetsu (阿佐鉄), and was previously translated as Asa Seaside Railway Corporation prior to 2013. Since the line goes through a relatively sparsely populated area, it is under severe business stress, to the point where closure of the line has been proposed.

The railway company commenced operating road–rail vehicles, known as DMV (dual-mode vehicle) in Japan, on the Asato Line from 25 December 2021 The vehicles used are three extensively modified Toyota Coaster minibuses, claimed to be the first in the world, which enable through service to locations without rail infrastructure. Actually, it is not even second of that kind, as the famous Schienen-Straßen-Omnibus of the Deutsche Bundesbahn, built in 1953, had already predecessors of Road–rail buses in the 1930s and 1940s.

The vehicles are classed as DMV93 type. In preparation for the beginning of DMV operations, the rail line was disconnected from the Mugi Line in summer 2019.

== History ==
Japanese National Railways started the construction of the eastern section of the Asa Line in 1959, proposed to reach Muroto, where it would connect with the planned extension of the western section of the Asa line from Kochi.

The first 12-kilometre (7.5 mi) section to Kaifu opened in 1973, and further construction was undertaken until work was suspended in 1980. In 1988 construction work south of Kaifu was re-started by the Asa Coast Railway Company, the then-newly founded third-sector company. The Kaifu–Kannoura section, now called the Asatō Line, opened in 1992.

The western portion of the planned Asa Line opened as the Tosa Kuroshio Railway Asa Line to Nahari in 2002. The Kannoura–Nahari section of the proposed Asa line has not been constructed. The proposed stations were None, Muroto, Kiragawa and Tosa-Hane.

Awa-Kainan Station has been transferred to Asa Coast Railway Company since 1 November 2020 for the purpose of constructing the required changeover facilities for the DMV. The railway line was suspended from 1 December 2020 with bustitution services running until the completion of the DMV facilities on 25 December 2021.

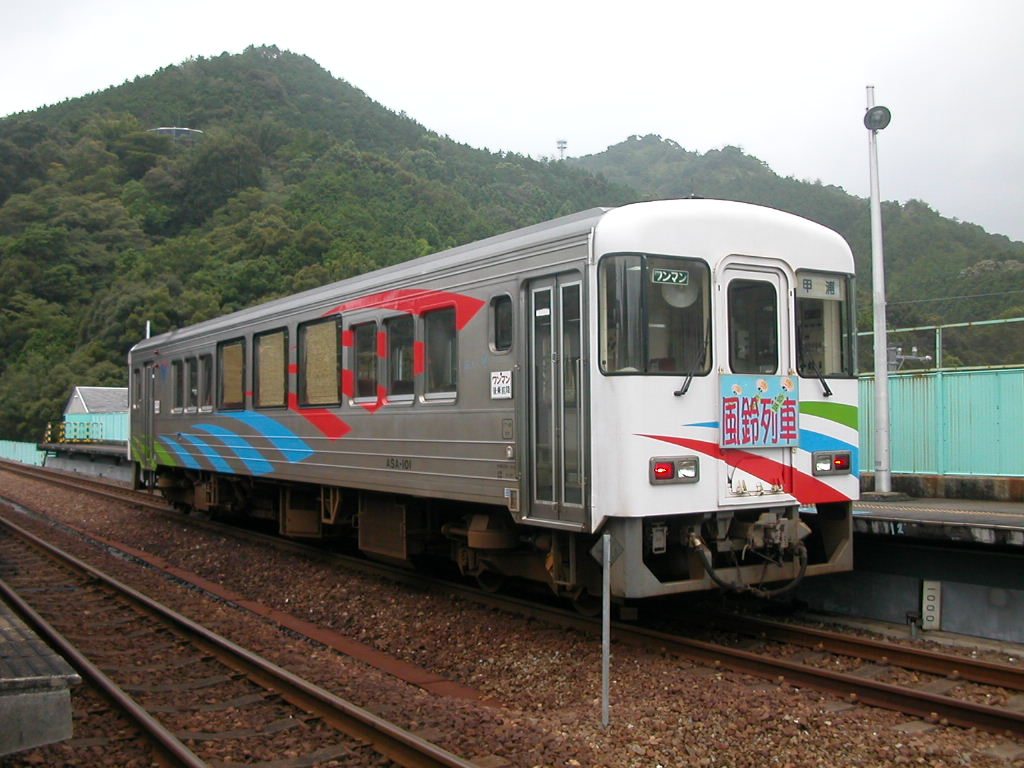
ASA-101 series which were withdrawn on 30 November 2020

=== DMV ===
Mode change of a "dual-mode vehicle" at Awa-Kainan Station.

The development of DMV started in 2011 as an alternative to traditional, more expensive, DMU trains for rail lines with limited passengers. In February 2016, Tokushima Prefecture announced its intentions of introducing DMV in commercial operations in the next 10 years.

==== Construction ====
On 10 January 2019, in preparation for the construction of DMV changeover facilities, the parking area and bus terminal near Kannoura Station was relocated 50 m south. On 1 December 2020, bustitution services operated by JR Shikoku Bus commenced between Mugi Station and Kannoura Station while the facilities were being constructed. On 1 February 2021, bustitution services was revised to operate from Mugi Station to Awa-Kainan Station. On 4 November 2021, the Railway Bureau of the Ministry of Land, Infrastructure, Transport and Tourism announced the completion of safety inspections and tests of the DMV conducted on the Asato Line. As such, on 10 November 2021, Asa Coast Railway Company announced the date for the planned introduction of DMV services. On 25 December 2021, DMV services commenced operating between Awa-Kainan Station and Kannoura Station.

==== Services ====
Services commence at Awakainan Bunkamura (Awa-Kainan Cultural Village) bus stop then proceed to Awa-Kainan Station to enter the railway line, travel south along the railway line to Kannoura Station, exit the railway line then proceed north to terminate at Michinoeki Shishikui Onsen (Roadside Station Shishikui Onsen) bus stop. The journey is 15 kilometres (9.3 mi) long and takes 34 minutes to complete.

On weekends and holidays, 1 trip per day extends to/from Cape Muroto stopping at 4 stops as indicated below. The journey is 50 kilometres (31 mi) long and takes 1 hour 30 minutes.

Operation commenced on 25 December 2021. 13 round trips per day were operated on weekdays, while on weekends & holidays there were 11 round trips as well as the 1 round trip to/from Cape Muroto which departed Awakainan Bunkamura at 10:57am, returning at 1:35pm.

On 11 March 2023, a revised timetable was introduced which reduced the number of trips on Tuesdays and Wednesdays from 13 to 8, and reduced from 11 to 10 on Weekends/Holidays. The round trip to Cape Muroto remained.

On 16 March 2024, a revised timetable was introduced which reduced the number of trips on all weekdays to 8. The number of weekend trips was unchanged. The first trip on all days departs Michinoeki Shishikui Onsen at 6:10am and the last trip terminates there at 5:38pm. The weekday timetable can be operated with one vehicle, while the weekend/holiday timetable requires two vehicles with some trips operating only 12 minutes apart. The weekend/holidays Cape Muroto trip departs Awakainan Bunkamura at 11:58am and arrives at Muroto (Uminoeki Toromu) at 1:28pm, departing there at 1:52pm and arriving back at Awakainan Bunkamura at 3:23pm.

Due to the limited capacity of the DMV (16 seats, 0 standing), the operator suggests that seats be booked in advance. Bookings can be made in person at Shishikui Station or at Japan Bus Online (in English). Service status and bookings are available (in Japanese) at J-Bus.

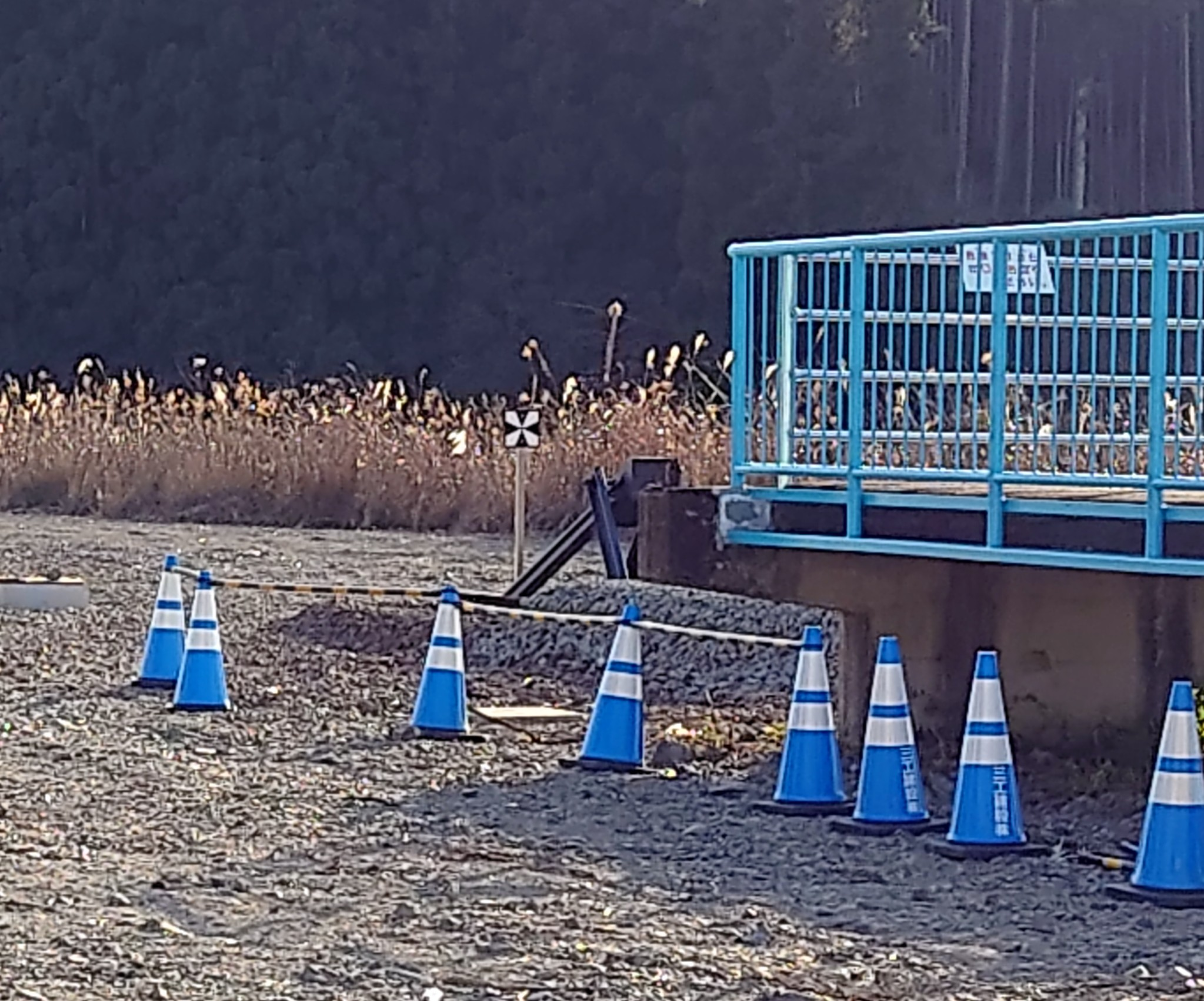
The end of Awa-Kainan Station

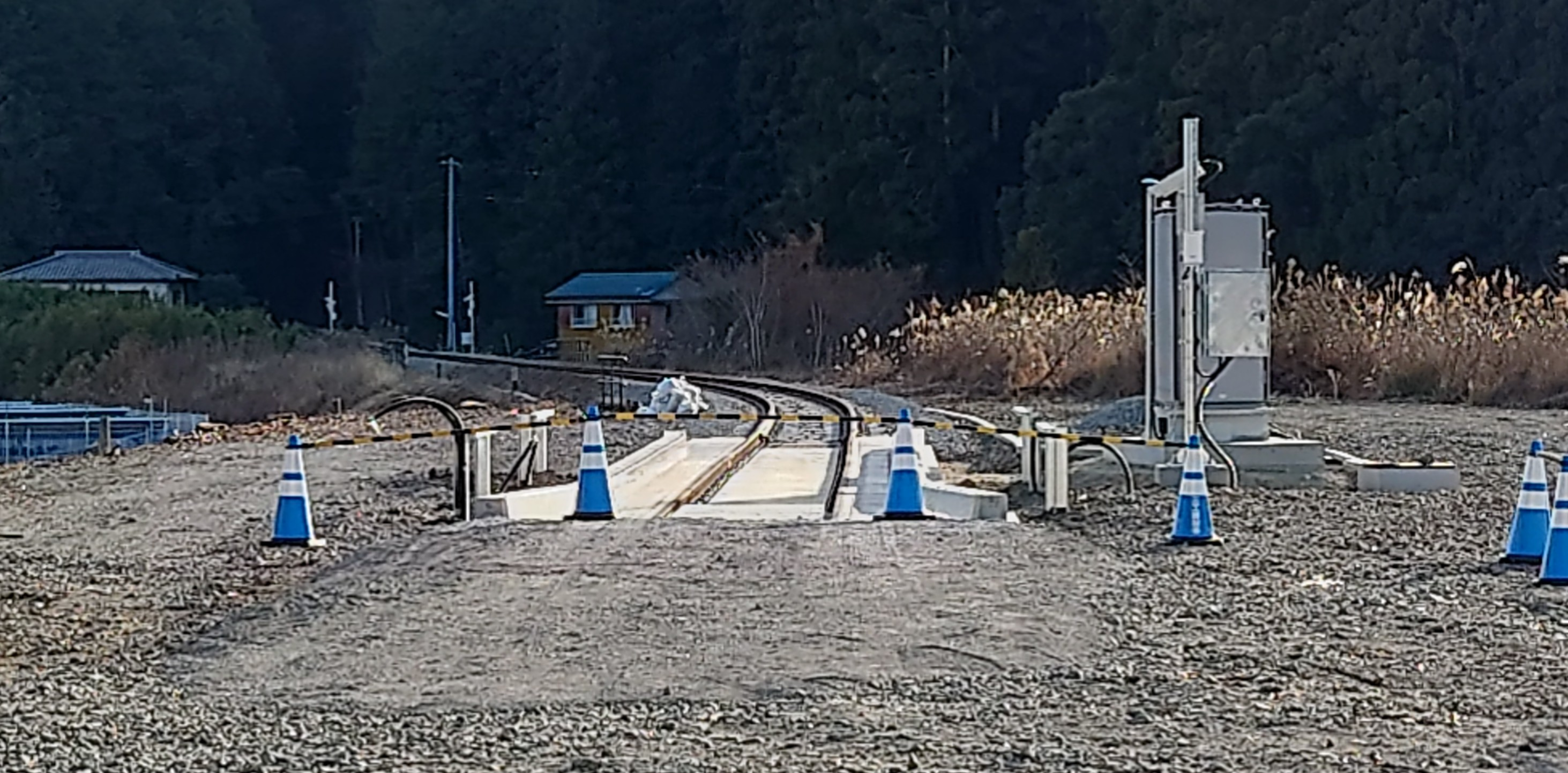
Changeover facilities of DMV

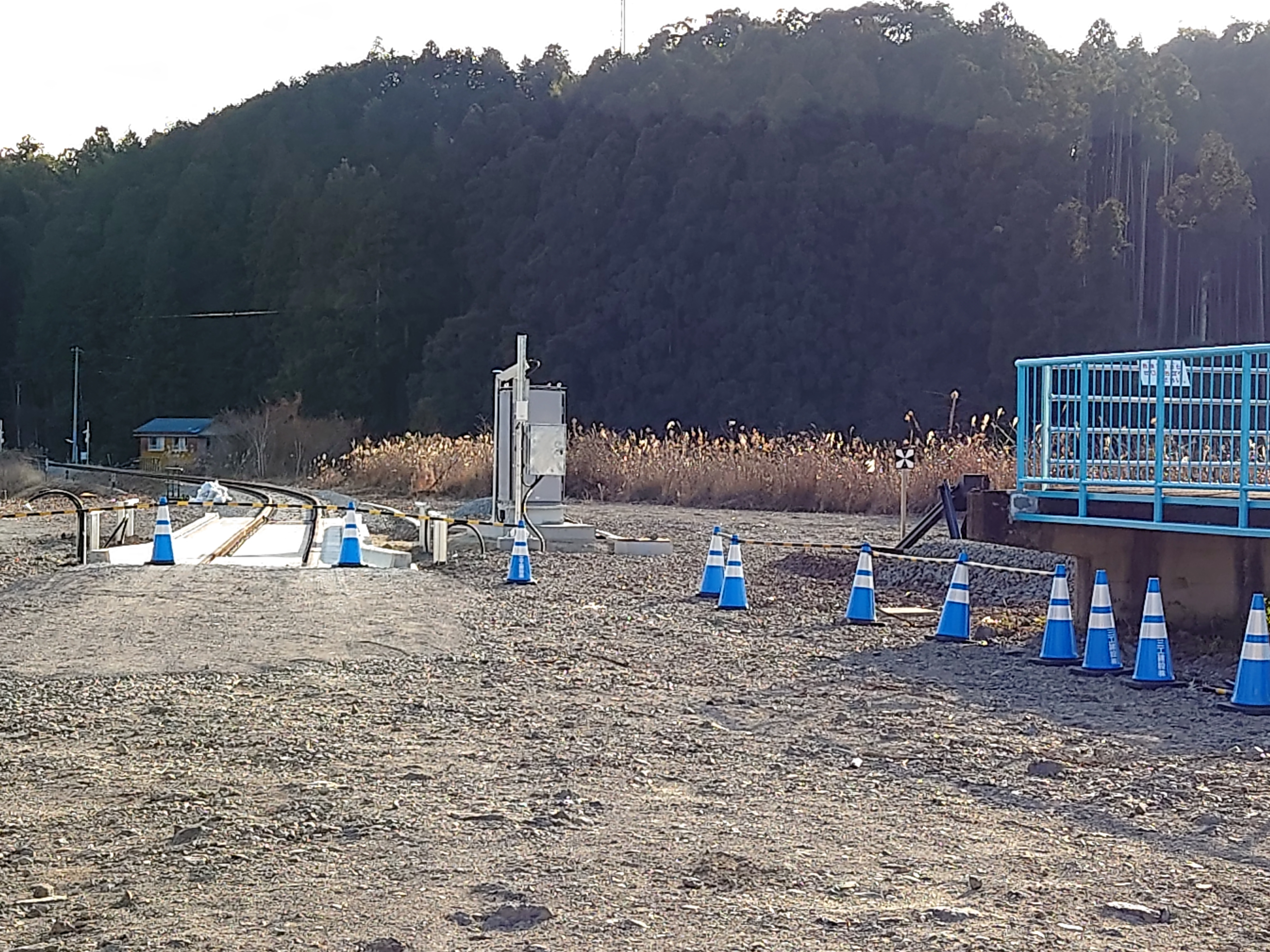
The Asato Line was disconnected from the JR Shikoku Mugi Line in 2019 due to the construction of DMV facilities

== Basic data ==
- Distance: 10.0 km / 6.2 mi.
- Gauge: 1,067 mm / 3 ft. 6 in.
- Stations: 4
- Double-track line: None
- Electric supply: Not electrified
- Railway signalling: Simplified automatic

== Stations ==
=== Railway stations ===
| No. | Station Name | | Distance (km) | Connections | Location |
|---|---|---|---|---|---|
All services commence from Awakainan Bunkamura and operate via public roads to Awa-Kainan Station
| M27 AS27 | Awa-Kainan | 阿波海南 | 0.0 | Shikoku Railway Company: Mugi Line (M27) | Mugi, Kaifu District, Tokushima Prefecture |
| AS28 | Kaifu | 海部 | 1.5 | | Kaiyō, Kaifu District, Tokushima Prefecture |
| AS29 | Shishikui | 宍喰 | 7.6 | | Kaiyō, Kaifu District, Tokushima Prefecture |
| AS30 | Kannoura | 甲浦 | 10.0 | | Tōyō, Aki District, Kōchi Prefecture |
All services continue via public roads to Michinoeki Shishikui Onsen; One weekend trip continues to Muroto (Uminoeki Toromu)

=== Bus stops (regular service) ===
| No. | Stop Name^{*} | | Location | English Translation^{*} |
|---|---|---|---|---|
| | Awakainan Bunkamura | 阿 波 海 南 文 化 村 | Kaiyō, Kaifu District, Tokushima Prefecture | Awa Kainan Cultural Village |
| | operates via railway line between Awa-Kainan Station and Kannoura Station | | | |
| | Umi-no-Eki Toyo-cho | 海 の 駅 東 洋 町 | Toyo, Aki District, Kochi Prefecture | Sea Station Toyo Town |
| | Michinoeki Shishikui Onsen | 道 の 駅 宍 喰 温 泉 | Kaiyō, Kaifu District, Tokushima Prefecture | Roadside Station Shishikui Onsen |

* "Stop Name" is the name shown in Google Maps and other online trip planners. "English Translation" provides a clearer understanding of the stop name for those not familiar with Japanese.

=== Bus stops (Muroto service – 1 trip on weekends and holidays) ===
| No. | Stop Name^{*} | | Location | English Translation^{*} |
|---|---|---|---|---|
| | Awakainan Bunkamura | 阿 波 海 南 文 化 村 | Kaiyō, Kaifu District, Tokushima Prefecture | Awa Kainan Cultural Village |
| | operates via railway line between Awa-Kainan Station and Kannoura Station | | | |
| | Umi-no-Eki Toyo-cho | 海 の 駅 東 洋 町 | Toyo, Aki District, Kochi Prefecture | Sea Station Toyo Town |
| | Muroto Haikou Suizokukan | むろと廃校水族館 | Muroto Misaki, Muroto, Kochi Prefecture | Muroto Schoolhouse Aquarium |
| | Muroto Sekai Geopark Center | 室戸世界ジオパークセンター | Muroto Misaki, Muroto, Kochi Prefecture | Muroto Global Geopark Center |
| | Muroto Misaki | 室戸岬 | Muroto Misaki, Muroto, Kochi Prefecture | Cape Muroto |
| | Muroto (Uminoeki Toromu) | 海の駅とろむ | Muroto Misaki, Muroto, Kochi Prefecture | Sea Station Toromu |

* "Stop Name" is the name shown in Google Maps and other online trip planners. "English Translation" provides a clearer understanding of the stop name for those not familiar with Japanese.

== See also ==
- Tosa Kuroshio Railway Asa Line
- List of railway companies in Japan
- List of railway lines in Japan
- Dual-mode vehicle
- Road–rail vehicle
- Parliamentary train
