= Minobayashi Station =

Railway station in Anan, Tokushima Prefecture, Japan

M13 Minobayashi Station 見能林駅
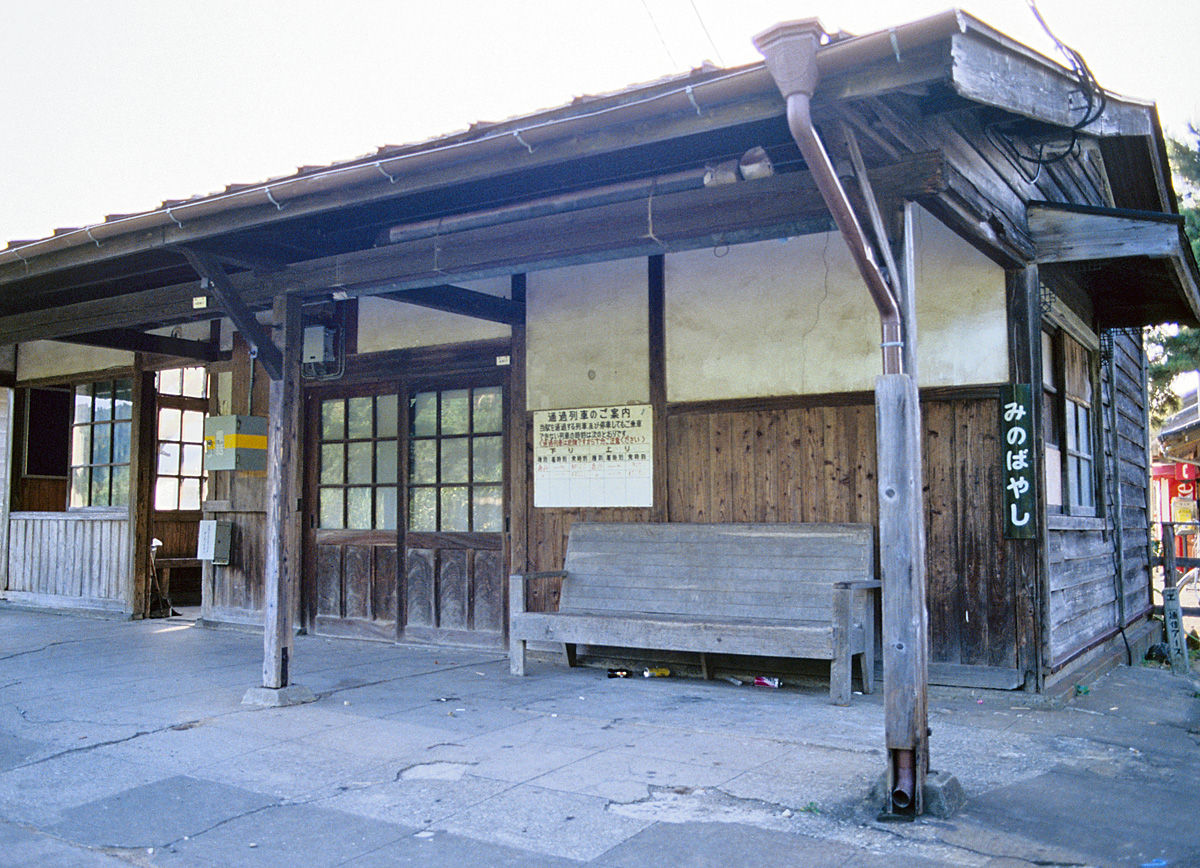
- Minobayashi Station before the fire in 1986

General information
- Location: Shimizuyamanohigashi Minobayashichō, Anan-shi, Tokushima-ken 774-0017; Japan
- Coordinates: 33.9032°N 134.6668°E
- Operator: JR Shikoku
- Line: ■ Mugi Line
- Distance: 26.4 km from Tokushima
- Platforms: 1 side platform
- Tracks: 1

Construction
- Structure type: At grade
- Accessible: Yes - ramp leads up to platform

Other information
- Status: Unstaffed
- Station code: M13

History
- Opened: 27 March 1936

Passengers
- FY2019: 614
Location
- Location within Tokushima Prefecture Location within Japan

Minobayashi Station (見能林駅, Minobayashi-eki) is a passenger railway station located in the city of Anan, Tokushima Prefecture, Japan. It is operated by JR Shikoku and has the station number "M13".

== Lines ==
Minobayashi Station is served by the Mugi Line and is located 26.4 km from the beginning of the line at Tokushima. All trains stop at this station.

== Layout ==
The station, which is unstaffed, consists of a side platform serving a single track. There is no station building, only a shelter on the platform for waiting passengers. A ramp leads up to the platform from the access road.

== Adjacent stations ==
«	Service	»
Mugi Line
Anan	Local	Awa-Tachibana

== History ==
Japanese Government Railways (JGR) opened Minobayashi Station on 27 March 1936 as an intermediate station during the first phase of the construction of the Mugi Line when a track was built from Hanoura to Kuwano. The station building was destroyed in a fire in the summer of 1986. On 1 April 1987, with the privatization of Japanese National Railways (JNR), the successor of JGR, JR Shikoku took over control of the Station.

== Passenger statistics ==
In fiscal 2019, the station was used by an average of 614 passengers daily.

== Surrounding area ==
- Anan City Minobayashi Elementary School
- Anan City Anan Junior High School
- Anan National College of Technology

== See also ==
- List of railway stations in Japan
