= Awa-Nakashima Station =

Railway station in Anan, Tokushima Prefecture, Japan

M11 Awa-Nakashima Station 阿波中島駅
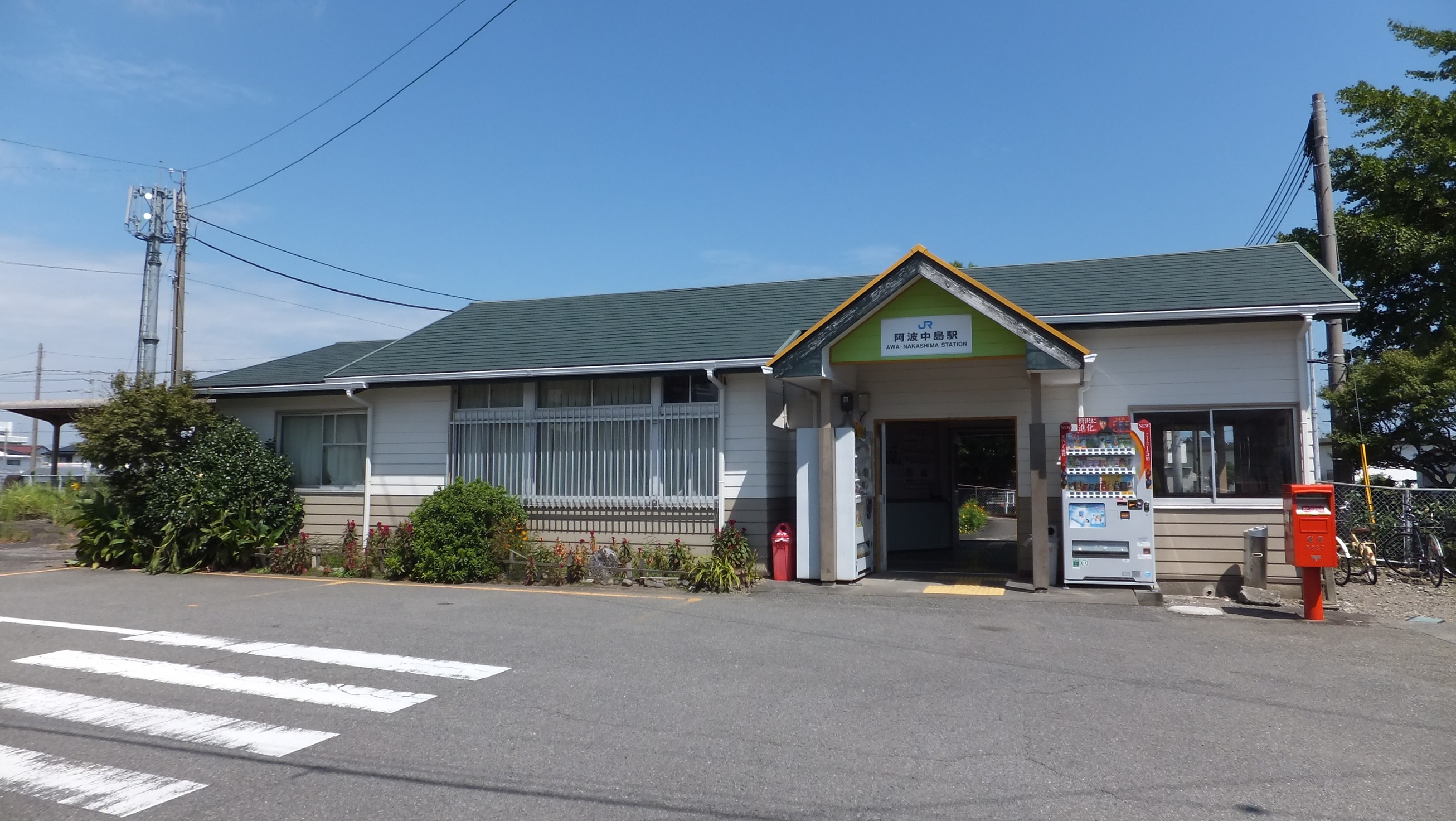
- Awa-Nakashima Station in September 2015

General information
- Location: Nakagawacho Akaike, Anan-shi, Tokushima-ken 779-1242; Japan
- Coordinates: 33.9410°N 134.6646°E
- Operator: JR Shikoku
- Line: ■ Mugi Line
- Distance: 21.8 km from Tokushima
- Platforms: 1 side platform
- Tracks: 1

Construction
- Structure type: At grade
- Cycle facilities: Designated parking area for bicycles
- Accessible: Yes - ramp leads up to platform

Other information
- Status: Unstaffed
- Station code: M11

History
- Opened: 27 March 1936

Passengers
- FY2019: 270
Location
- Location within Tokushima Prefecture Location within Japan

Awa-Nakashima Station (阿波中島駅, Awa-Nakashima-eki) is a passenger railway station located in the city of Anan, Tokushima Prefecture, Japan. It is operated by JR Shikoku and has the station number "M11".

== Lines ==
Awa-Nakashima Station is served by the Mugi Line and is located 21.8 km from the beginning of the line at Tokushima. All trains stop at this station.

== Layout ==
The station consists of a side platform serving a single track. The present track was formerly track 2 of a two-track island platform configuration. The trackbed of track 1, on the other side of the platform is still visible. The station building is unstaffed and serves only as a waiting room. A paved path crosses the trackbed of the former track 1 and leads to a ramp, giving wheelchair access to the platform.

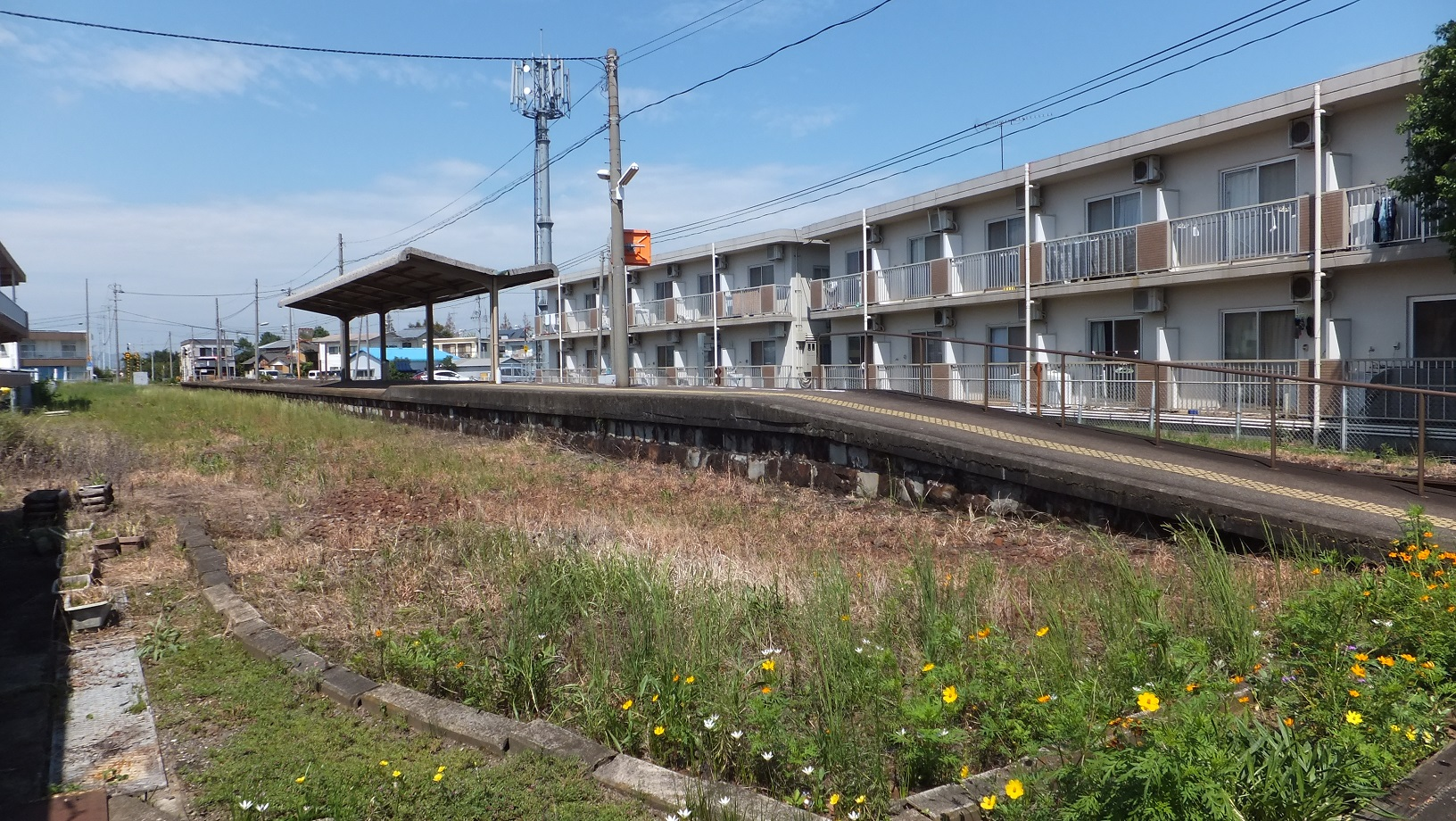
A view of the station platform and track.

== Adjacent stations ==
«	Service	»
Mugi Line
Nishibara	Local	Anan

== History ==
Awa-Nakashima Station was opened on 27 March 1936 by Japanese Government Railways (JGR) under the name Awa-Nakajima. It was an intermediate station during the first phase of the construction of the Mugi Line when a track was built from Hanoura to Kuwano. On 15 October 1936, the reading of the station name was changed to Awa-Nakashima, with no change to the kanji characters used. On 1 April 1987, with the privatization of Japanese National Railways (JNR), the successor of JGR, JR Shikoku took over control of the Station.

== Passenger statistics ==
In fiscal 2019, the station was used by an average of 270 passengers daily.

== Surrounding area ==
- Anan City Hall Nakagawa Branch (formerly Nakagawa Town Hall)
- Anan City Nagagawa Library
- Nakajima Post Office
- Saikou-ji Temple

== See also ==
- List of railway stations in Japan
