= 新野駅 =

新野駅 may refer to:

- Aratano Station
- Niino Station
