= Cape Kamoda =

Headland in Tokushima Prefecture, Japan

Cape Kamoda 蒲生田岬
- Cape
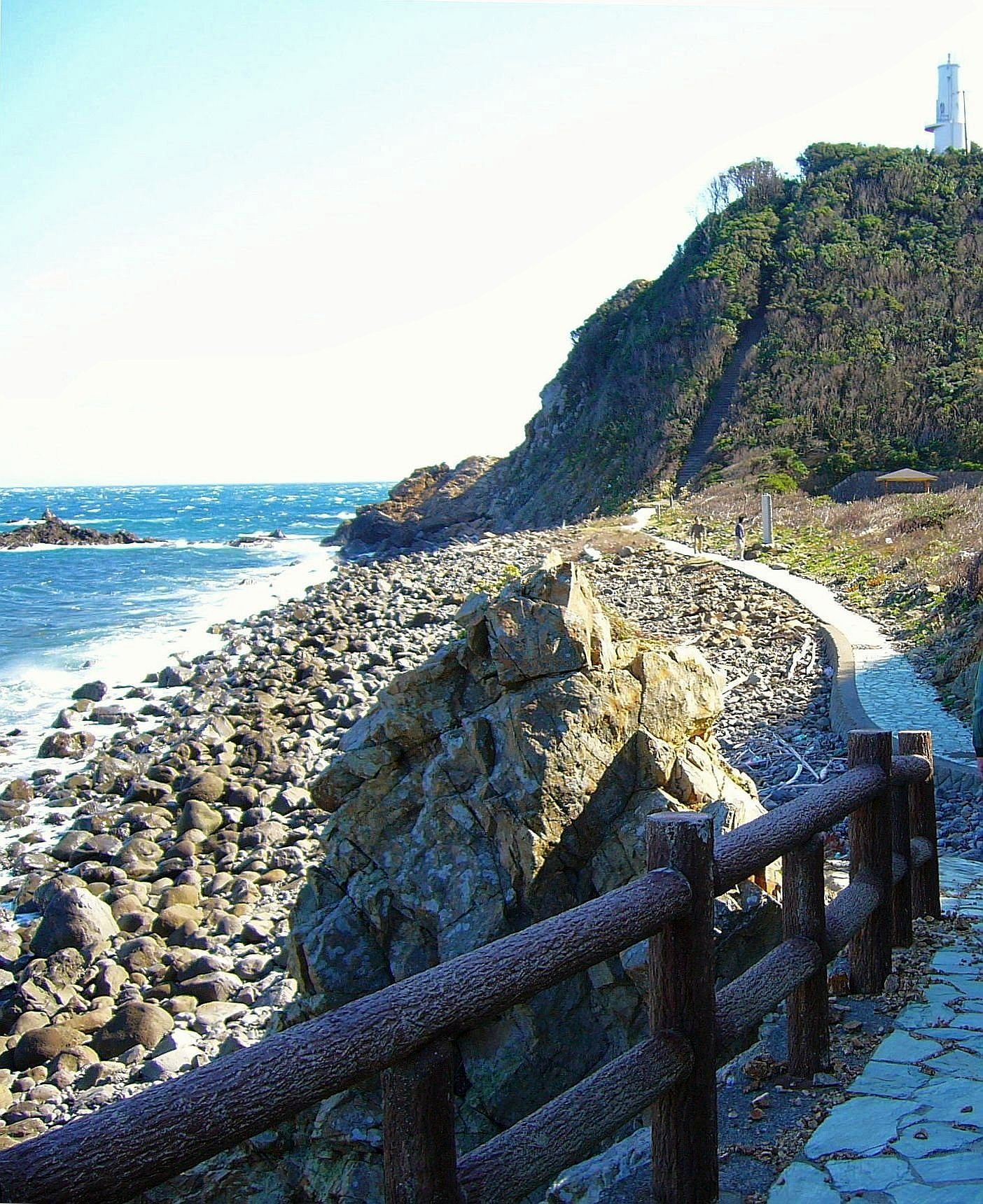
- Cape Kamoda

- Location of Cape Kamoda on Shikoku Cape Kamoda (Japan)
- Coordinates: 33°50′03″N 134°45′00″E
- Location: Anan, Tokushima Prefecture, Japan

Cape Kamoda (蒲生田岬, Kamoda-misaki) is a headland at the easternmost point of the Japanese island of Shikoku, in the city of Anan, Tokushima Prefecture. The promontory extends into the Kii Channel and is situated within Muroto-Anan Kaigan Quasi-National Park. Above the cape is Cape Kamoda Lighthouse, which started operating in 1924; from its observatory it is possible to see Cape Hi in Wakayama Prefecture, Ōnaruto Bridge, and Awaji Island. In 2010 a stone sculpture known as "Wave Song" (「波の詩」) was erected nearby. North of the cape lies Maiko Island, while I Island is to the east. The sandy beach to the north is an egg-laying ground for loggerhead sea turtles and has been designated a Prefectural Natural Monument. In late autumn and winter, so-called "Daruma Sunrises" sometime occur, with the sun appearing in the shape of the Greek letter omega Ω.

== See also ==
- List of Places of Scenic Beauty of Japan (Tokushima)
- List of Natural Monuments of Japan (Tokushima)
- Cape Ashizuri
- Cape Sada
