= Awa-Tachibana Station =

Railway station in Anan, Tokushima Prefecture, Japan

M14 Awa-Tachibana Station 阿波橘駅
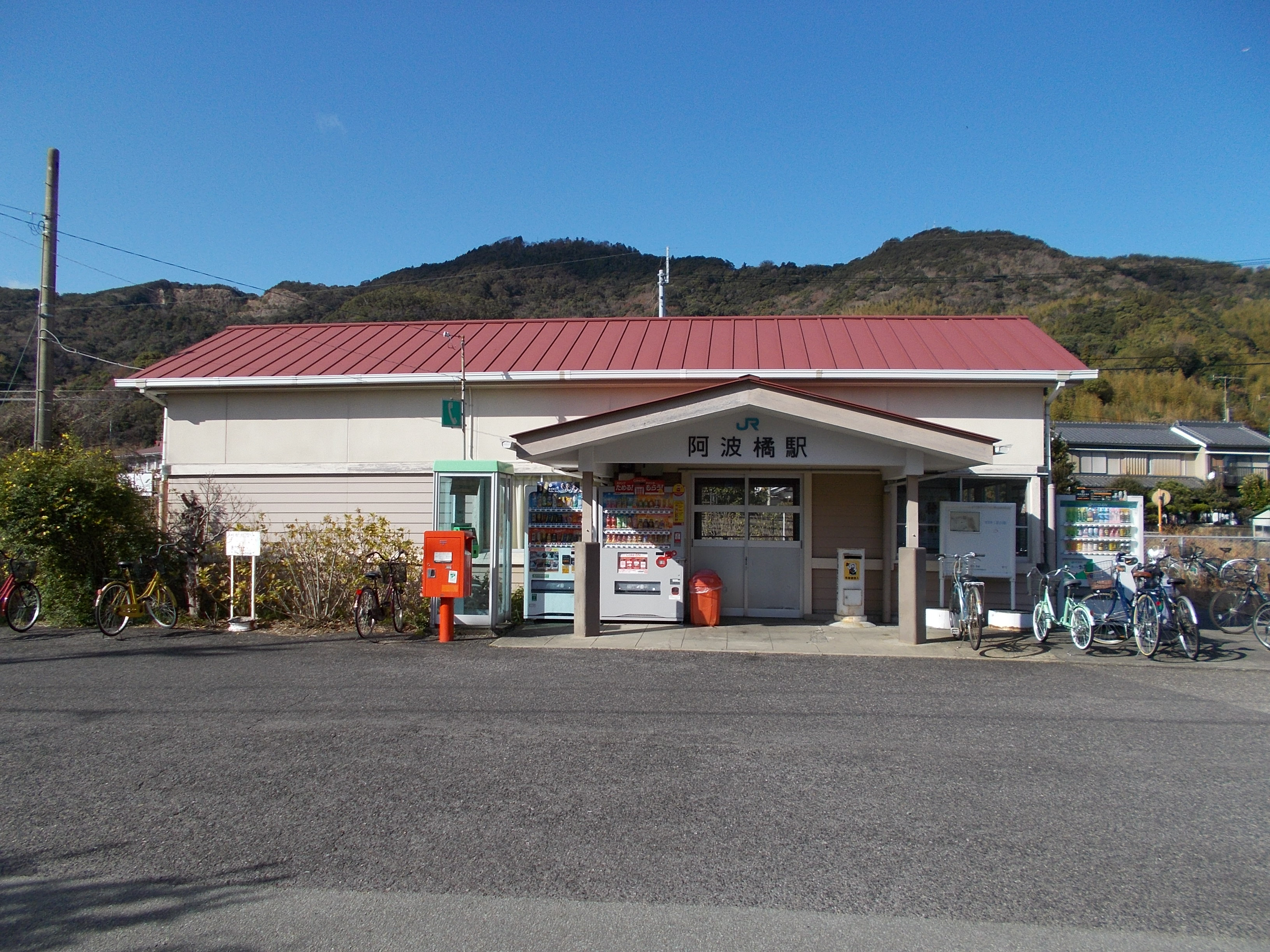
- Awa-Tachibana Station in January 2019

General information
- Location: Higashibun Tsunominechō, Anan-shi, Tokushima-ken 774-0021; Japan
- Coordinates: 33.8883°N 134.6511°E
- Operator: JR Shikoku
- Line: ■ Mugi Line
- Distance: 28.6 km from Tokushima
- Platforms: 1 side platform
- Tracks: 1

Construction
- Structure type: At grade
- Accessible: Yes - ramp leads up to platform

Other information
- Status: Unstaffed
- Station code: M14

History
- Opened: 27 March 1936

Passengers
- FY2019: 97
Location
- Location within Tokushima Prefecture Location within Japan

Awa-Tachibana Station (阿波橘駅, Awa-Tachibana-eki) is a passenger railway station located in the city of Anan, Tokushima Prefecture, Japan. It is operated by JR Shikoku and has the station number "M14".

== Lines ==
Awa-Tachibana Station is served by the Mugi Line and is located 28.6 km from the beginning of the line at Tokushima. As of the Muroto limited express' discontinuation in March 2025, only local trains service the line. As a result, all trains stop at this station.

== Layout ==
The station consists of a side platform serving a single track. The station building is unstaffed and serves only as a waiting room. Access to the platform is by means of a ramp from the station building.

== Adjacent stations ==
«	Service	»
Mugi Line
Minobayashi	Local	Kuwano

== History ==
Japanese Government Railways (JGR) opened Awa-Tachibana Station on 27 March 1936 as an intermediate station during the first phase of the construction of the Mugi Line when a track was built from Hanoura to Kuwano. On 1 April 1987, with the privatization of Japanese National Railways (JNR), the successor of JGR, JR Shikoku took over control of the Station.

== Passenger statistics ==
In fiscal 2019, the station was used by an average of 97 passengers daily.

== Surrounding area ==
- Anan City Tsunomine Elementary School
- Anan City Tsunomine District Disaster Prevention Park
- Anan City Tsunomine Fureai Park

== See also ==
- List of railway stations in Japan
