= Anan, Tokushima =

Anan 阿南市
- City
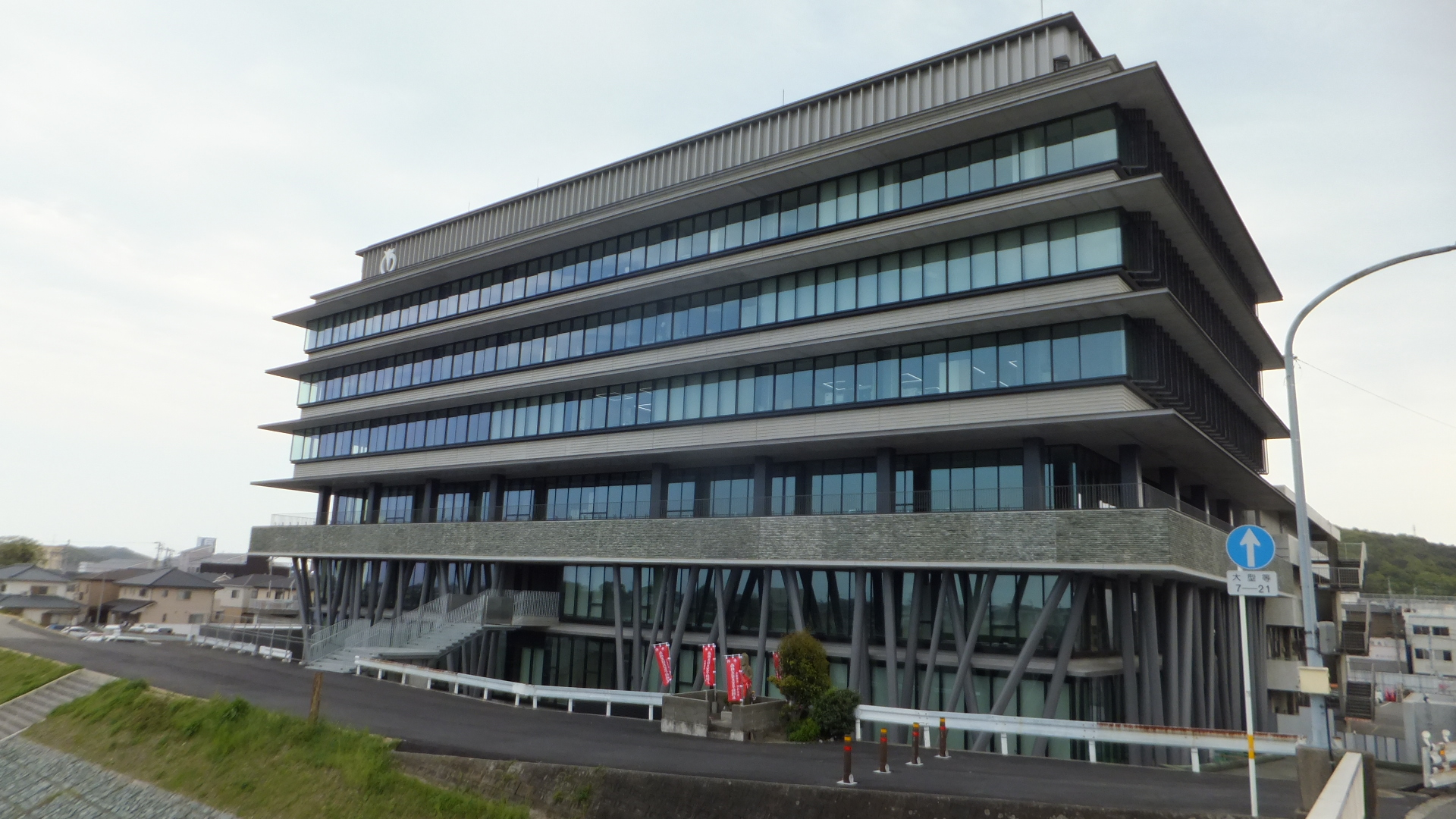
- Anan City Hall

- Flag Emblem
- Interactive map of Anan
- Location in Japan
- Coordinates: 33°55′N 134°40′E
- Country: Japan
- Region: Shikoku
- Prefecture: Tokushima

Government
  - Mayor: Yoshihiro Iwasa

Area
  - Total: 279.25 km^{2} (107.82 sq mi)

Population (June 30, 2022)
  - Total: 70,285
  - Density: 251.69/km^{2} (651.88/sq mi)
- Time zone: UTC+09:00 (JST)
- City hall address: 12-3, Tomiokachō Tonomachi, Anan-shi, Tokushima-ken 774-8501
- Climate: Cfa
- Website: Official website
- Symbols
- Bird: Swallow
- Flower: Sunflower
- Tree: Ume

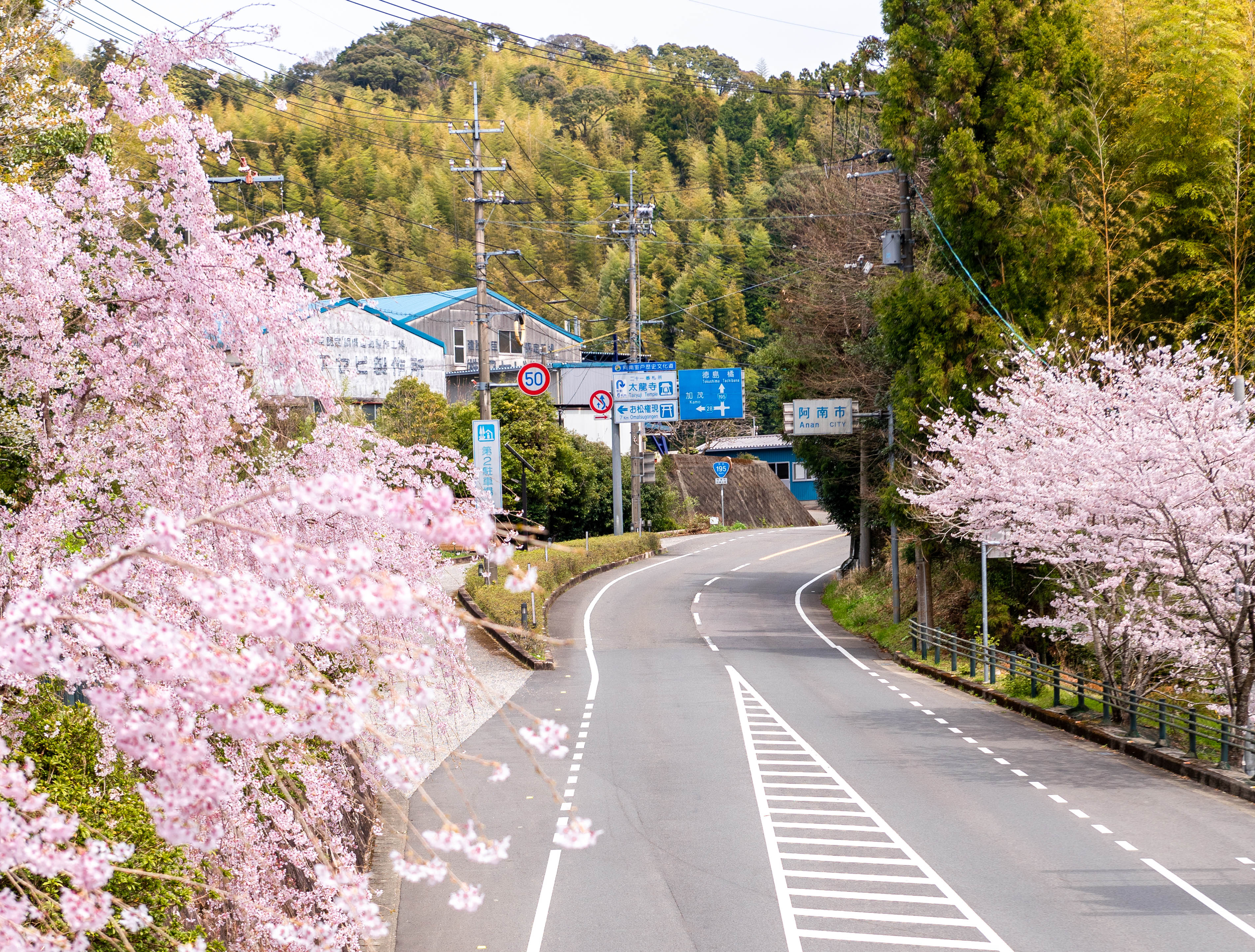
Japan National Route 195 in Anan

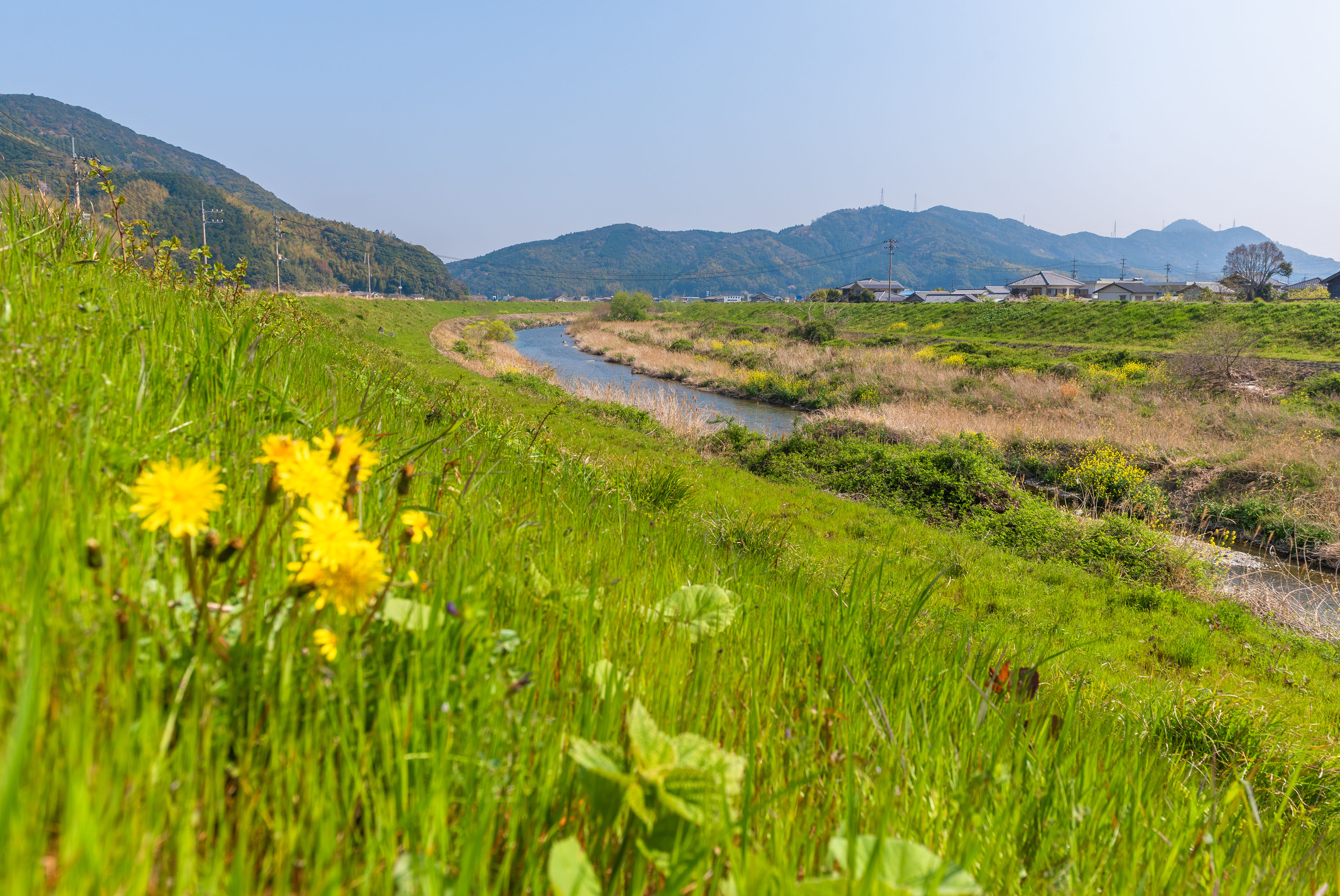
Kuwano River in Anan

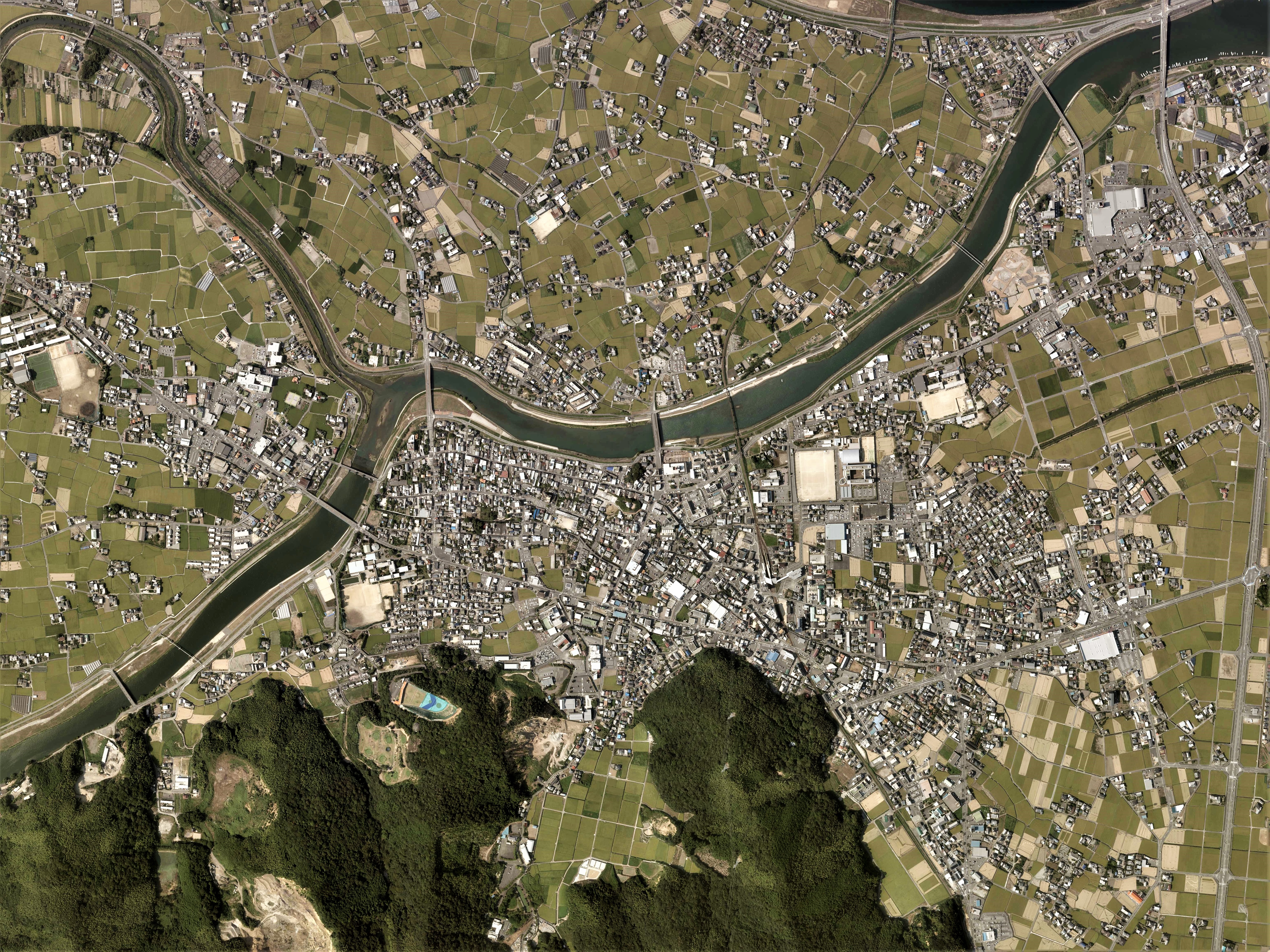
Aerial View of Anan

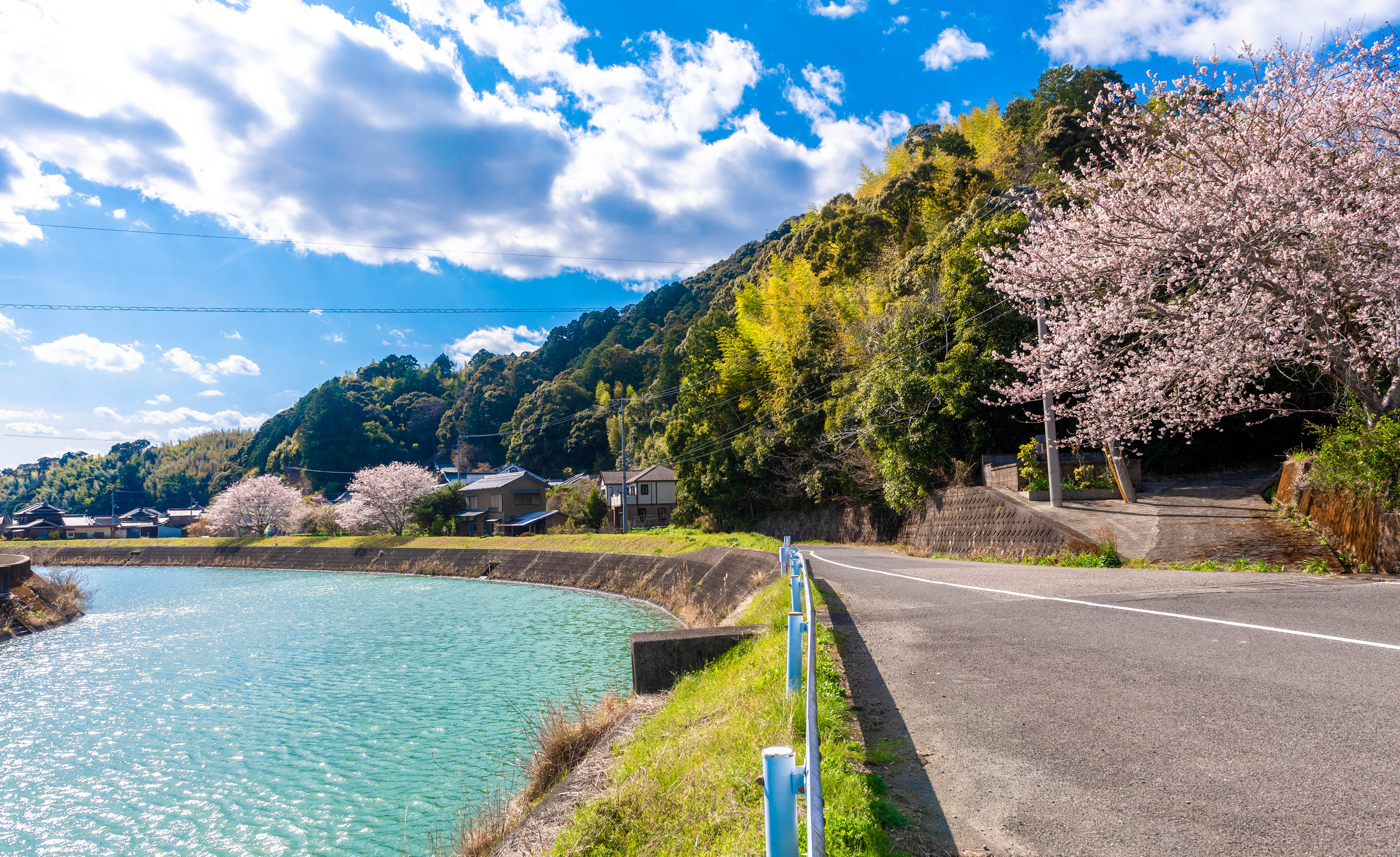
near Byōdō-ji

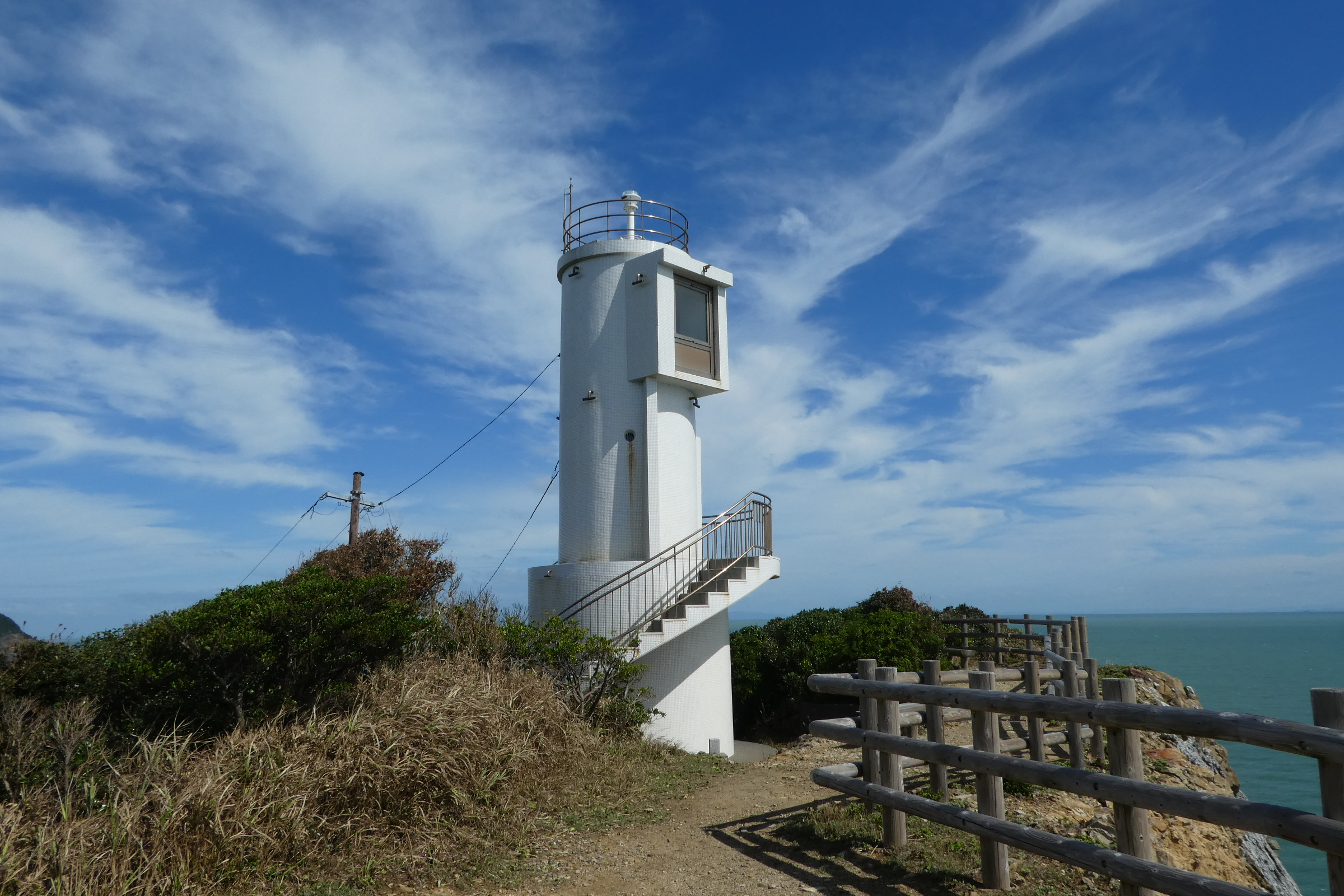
Kamodamisaki Lighthouse

Anan (阿南市, Anan-shi; Japanese pronunciation: [ä́.nä̀ɴ̀, ä̀.nä́ɰ̃̀.ɕì]) is a city in Tokushima Prefecture, Japan. As of 30 June 2022, the city had an estimated population of 70,285 in 31313 households and a population density of 250 persons per km^{2}. The total area of the city is 279.25 square kilometres (107.82 sq mi).

== Geography ==
Anan is located in the southeastern part of Tokushima Prefecture and is the easternmost municipality on the island of Shikoku. The east faces the Kii Channel and the Pacific Ocean, and is the northern end of Muroto-Anan Kaigan Quasi-National Park. The city is at the mouth of the Naka River, which is the longest river in the prefecture, and the Kuwano River runs through the city. The city has two main urban centers: the Tokushima district, which is a former castle town, and the Tachibana district, which is a port city.

=== Neighbouring municipalities ===
Tokushima Prefecture

- Katsuura
- Komatsushima
- Minami
- Naka

=== Climate ===
Anan has a humid subtropical climate (Köppen climate classification Cfa) with hot summers and cool winters. Precipitation is high, but there is a pronounced difference between the wetter summers and drier winters. The average annual temperature in Anan is 16.7 °C (62.1 °F). The average annual rainfall is 1,993.3 mm (78.48 in) with September as the wettest month. The temperatures are highest on average in August, at around 27.2 °C (81.0 °F), and lowest in January, at around 7.0 °C (44.6 °F). The highest temperature ever recorded in Anan was 36.7 °C (98.1 °F) on 2 August 2026; the coldest temperature ever recorded was −4.9 °C (23.2 °F) on 26 February 1981.

Climate data for Cape Kamoda, Anan (1991−2020 normals, extremes 1978−present)
Month	Jan	Feb	Mar	Apr	May	Jun	Jul	Aug	Sep	Oct	Nov	Dec	Year
Record high °C (°F)	18.8 (65.8)	21.2 (70.2)	22.7 (72.9)	27.2 (81.0)	30.2 (86.4)	33.0 (91.4)	35.1 (95.2)	36.7 (98.1)	33.9 (93.0)	29.8 (85.6)	25.5 (77.9)	22.2 (72.0)	36.7 (98.1)
Mean daily maximum °C (°F)	10.3 (50.5)	10.7 (51.3)	13.8 (56.8)	18.5 (65.3)	22.6 (72.7)	25.3 (77.5)	29.0 (84.2)	30.9 (87.6)	27.8 (82.0)	22.9 (73.2)	17.9 (64.2)	12.9 (55.2)	20.2 (68.4)
Daily mean °C (°F)	7.0 (44.6)	7.2 (45.0)	9.9 (49.8)	14.6 (58.3)	18.8 (65.8)	22.0 (71.6)	25.7 (78.3)	27.2 (81.0)	24.5 (76.1)	19.6 (67.3)	14.6 (58.3)	9.5 (49.1)	16.7 (62.1)
Mean daily minimum °C (°F)	4.0 (39.2)	4.0 (39.2)	6.3 (43.3)	10.8 (51.4)	15.3 (59.5)	19.4 (66.9)	23.3 (73.9)	24.5 (76.1)	21.8 (71.2)	16.8 (62.2)	11.4 (52.5)	6.4 (43.5)	13.7 (56.6)
Record low °C (°F)	−3.9 (25.0)	−4.9 (23.2)	−2.8 (27.0)	2.0 (35.6)	7.1 (44.8)	13.4 (56.1)	16.2 (61.2)	17.6 (63.7)	15.6 (60.1)	7.6 (45.7)	1.1 (34.0)	−3.1 (26.4)	−4.9 (23.2)
Average precipitation mm (inches)	69.6 (2.74)	91.1 (3.59)	133.5 (5.26)	149.0 (5.87)	182.7 (7.19)	242.8 (9.56)	229.3 (9.03)	172.2 (6.78)	284.9 (11.22)	228.8 (9.01)	124.8 (4.91)	83.3 (3.28)	1,993.3 (78.48)
Average precipitation days (≥ 1.0 mm)	5.7	7.1	9.4	9.8	10.2	13.2	11.1	8.6	11.1	9.5	6.9	5.6	108.2
Mean monthly sunshine hours	183.5	167.5	193.4	201.9	205.8	155.3	200.5	248.1	173.5	175.1	163.0	183.7	2,247.7
Source: Japan Meteorological Agency

== Demographics ==
Per Japanese census data, the population of Anan in 2020 is 69,470 people. Anan has been conducting censuses since 1920.

Historical population
Year	Pop.	±%
1920	63,816	—
1925	64,263	+0.7%
1930	65,777	+2.4%
1935	68,120	+3.6%
1940	67,973	−0.2%
1945	82,805	+21.8%
1950	83,804	+1.2%
1955	82,478	−1.6%
1960	79,397	−3.7%
1965	77,729	−2.1%
1970	76,607	−1.4%
1975	80,927	+5.6%
1980	82,715	+2.2%
1985	82,247	−0.6%
1990	80,702	−1.9%
1995	79,479	−1.5%
2000	78,971	−0.6%
2005	78,002	−1.2%
2010	76,094	−2.4%
2015	73,019	−4.0%
2020	69,470	−4.9%
Anan population statistics

== History ==
As with all of Tokushima Prefecture, the area of Anan was part of ancient Awa Province. The Naka River valley was settled since at least the Kofun period, and archaeologists have found many kofun burial mounds and the traces of Japan's oldest cinnabar mine. During the Edo period, the area was part of the holdings of Tokushima Domain ruled by the Hachisuka clan from their seat at Tokushima Castle. Following the Meiji restoration, it was organized into 17 villages within Naka District, Tokushima with the creation of the modern municipalities system on October 1, 1889, including the villages of Tomioka and Tachibanaura. Tomioka was raised town status in 1905 and Tachibanaura became Tachibana town in 1912. The two towns merged on May 1, 1958, to form the city of Anan. On March 20, 2006, the towns of Hanoura and Nakagawa (both from Naka District) were merged into Anan.

== Government ==
Anan has a mayor-council form of government with a directly elected mayor and a unicameral city council of 28 members. Anan contributes four members to the Tokushima Prefectural Assembly. In terms of national politics, the city is part of Tokushima 1st district of the lower house of the Diet of Japan.

== Economy ==
Anan was traditionally known for its production of edible bamboo shoots and bamboo products. In modern times, it has been associated with Nichia, a global LED and electronic materials manufacturer which has its headquarters and several factories in the city. Also in the city is the static inverter plant of Kii Channel HVDC system. Agriculture and commercial fishing also play a role in the economy.

== Education ==
Anan has 22 public elementary schools and ten public middle schools operated by the city government and one public middle school and four public high schools operated by the Tokushima Prefectural Department of Education. The prefecture also operates one special education school for the handicapped. The city also has the National Institute of Technology, Anan College.

== Transportation ==
=== Railway ===
Shikoku Railway Company – Mugi Line

- Hanoura - Nishibara - Awa-Nakashima - Anan - Minobayashi - Awa-Tachibana - Kuwano - Aratano - Awa-Fukui

=== Highways ===
- Tokushima Expressway
- Anan-Aki Expressway
- National Route 55
- National Route 195

== Local attractions ==
- Byōdō-ji, 22nd temple on the Shikoku Pilgrimage
- Tairyū-ji, 21st temple on the Shikoku Pilgrimage
- Wakasugiyama Site, Kofun period cinnabar mine trace. National Historic Site

== Notable people ==
- Fukura P - Japanese YouTuber and producer
