= 新野 =

新野 may refer to:

- Aratano Station
- Niino Station
- Xinye County
- Atsushi Niino
