= Anan Station =

Railway station in Anan, Tokushima Prefecture, Japan

M12 Anan Station 阿南駅
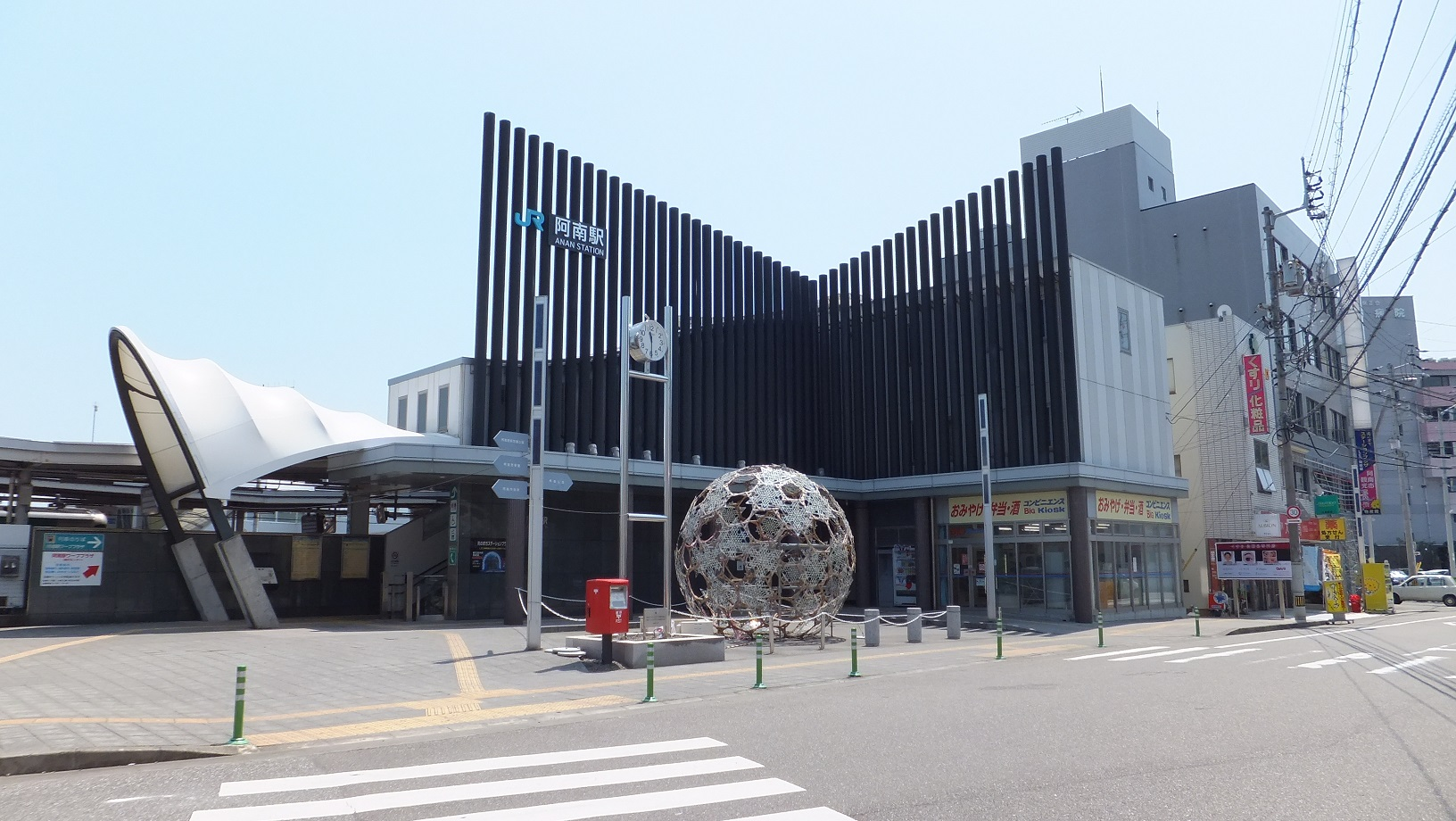
- Anan Station in August 2015

General information
- Location: Konpukuji Tomiokachō, Anan-shi, Tokushima-ken 774-0030; Japan
- Coordinates: 33.9185°N 134.6615°E
- Operator: JR Shikoku
- Line: ■ Mugi Line
- Distance: 24.5 km from Tokushima
- Platforms: 2 side platforms
- Tracks: 2 + 1 passing loop and 1 siding

Construction
- Structure type: At grade
- Parking: Available
- Accessible: Yes - platform accessed by bridge equipped with elevators

Other information
- Status: Staffed - JR ticket window
- Station code: M12
- Website: Official website

History
- Opened: 27 March 1936
- Rebuilt: November 2003
- Former names: Awa-Tomioka until 1 November 1966

Passengers
- FY2023: 1166
Location
- Location within Tokushima Prefecture Location within Japan

Anan Station (阿南駅, Anan-eki) is a passenger railway station located in the city of Anan, Tokushima Prefecture, Japan. It is operated by JR Shikoku and has the station number "M12".

== Lines ==
Anan Station is served by the Mugi Line and is located 24.5 km from the beginning of the line at Tokushima. As of the Muroto limited express' discontinuation in March 2025, only local trains service the line. As a result, all trains stop at this station.

== Layout ==
The station consists of 2 side platforms serving two tracks. A siding and a passing loop branch off track 2 and run on the other side of platform 2. The present station building, completed in 2003 is a hashigami (橋上) structure where passenger facilities are located on a bridge which spans the tracks.

The main station entrance is on the west side of the tracks from where elevators and escalators lead to the bridge structure on level 2 which houses ticket gates, a waiting area, a JR ticket window (without a Midori no Madoguchi facility) and a JR travel centre (Warp Plaza). From the bridge, separate escalators and elevators connect to both platforms.

On level 1 near the main entrance on the west side are toilets and tenantable shop space. A large designated parking area for bicycles is located nearby.

On the east side of the tracks, the "hashigami" bridge structure also connects to a neighboring building as well as a second station entrance from he road. Another bicycle parking area and parking lots for cars are available near this entrance.

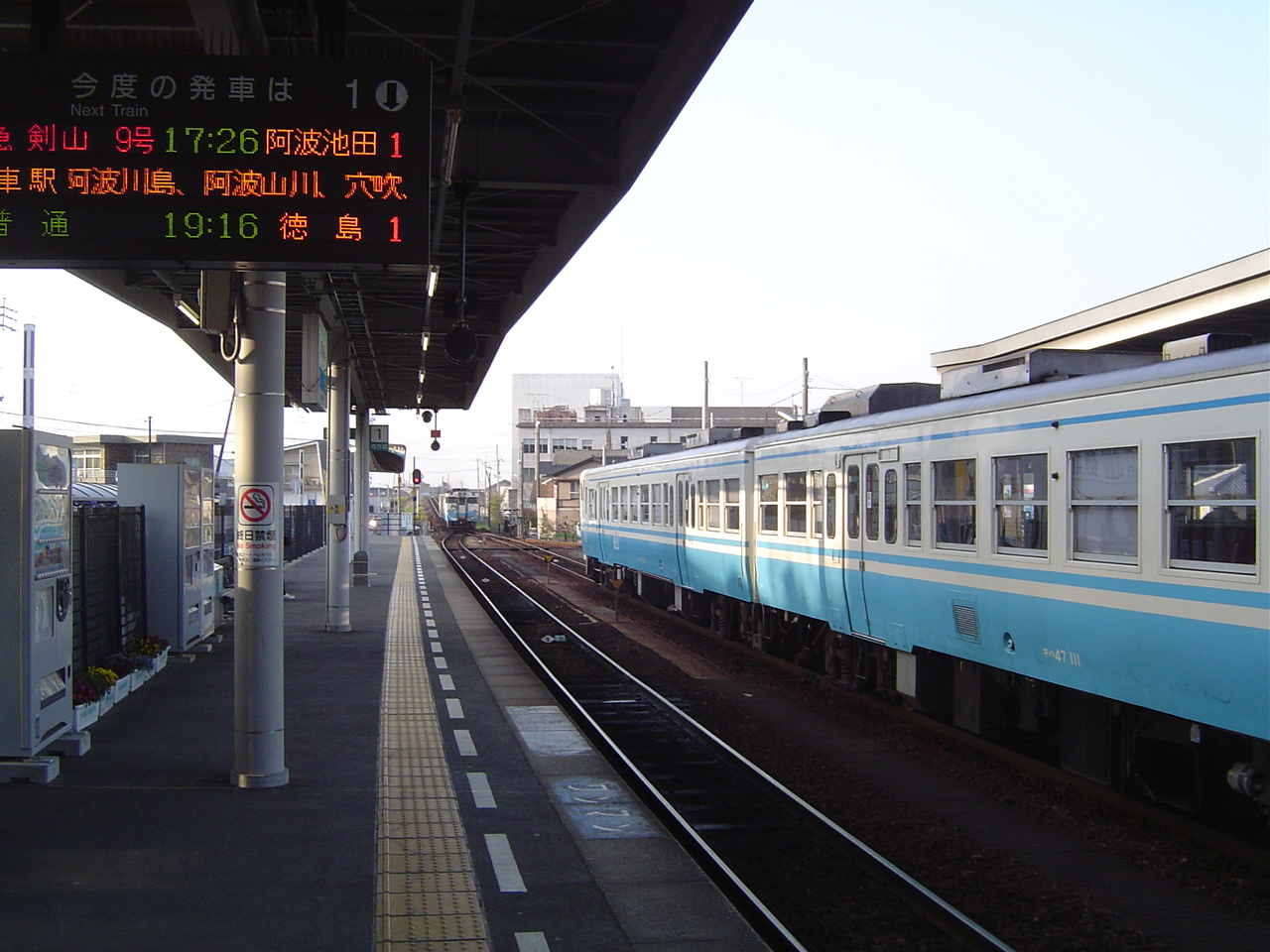
A view of the station platforms and tracks. The train is on track 2.

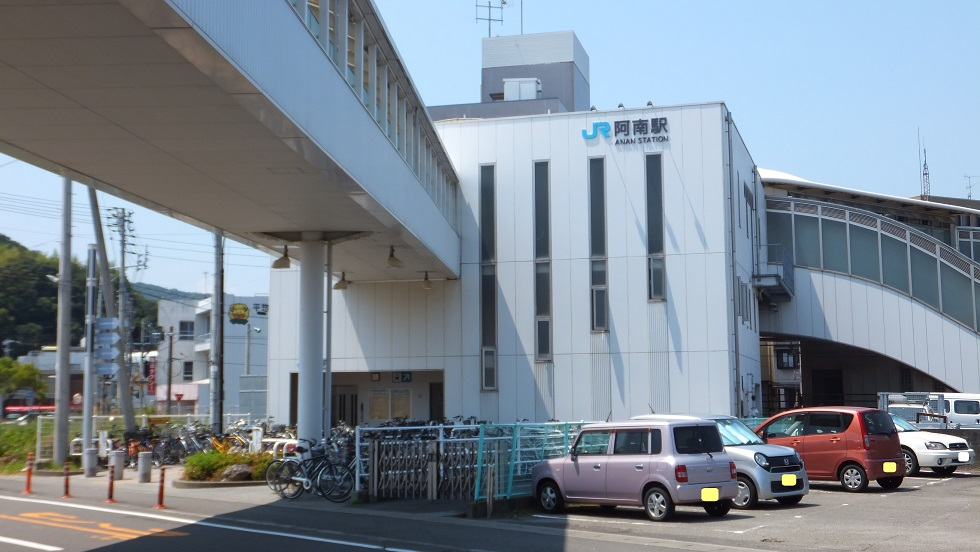
The east entrance of the station.

== Adjacent stations ==
«	Service	»
Mugi Line
Awa-Nakashima	Local	Minobayashi

== History ==
Anan Station was opened on 27 March 1936 by Japanese Government Railways (JGR) under the name Awa-Tomioka (阿波富岡, Awa-Tomioka). It was an intermediate station during the first phase of the construction of the Mugi Line when a track was built from Hanoura to Kuwano. On 1 November 1966, the name of the station was changed to Anan. On 1 April 1987, with the privatization of Japanese National Railways (JNR), the successor of JGR, JR Shikoku took over control of the Station.

In November 2003, the present station building, incorporating a hashigami design, was completed and opened.

== Passenger statistics ==
In fiscal 2023, the station was used by an average of 1166 passengers daily.

== Surrounding area ==
- Anan City Hall
- Anan City Cultural Center (Dream Hall)
- Anan City Commerce and Industry Promotion Center
- Anan Chamber of Commerce
- Anan City Tomioka Elementary School

== See also ==
- List of railway stations in Japan
