= Muroto (train) =

Former limited express train service in Tokushima, Japan

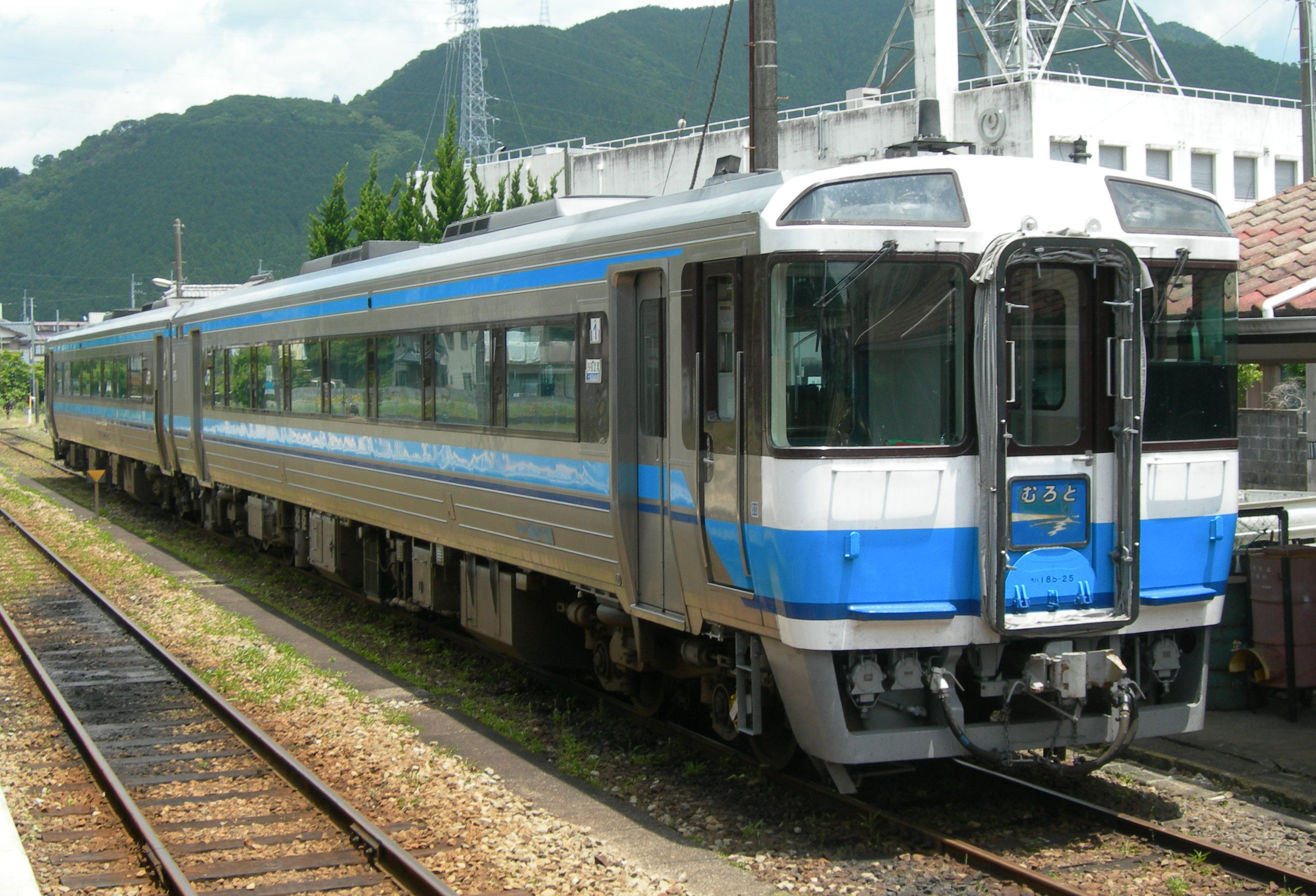
- Kiha 185 series train on a Muroto service in May 2010

Overview
- Service type: Limited express
- Status: Discontinued
- First service: 1962 (Semi express); 1966 (Express); 1999 (Limited express)
- Last service: 14 March 2025
- Former operator: JR Shikoku

Route
- Termini: Tokushima; Mugi
- Stops: 11
- Distance travelled: 67.7 km (42.1 mi) (Tokushima-Mugi)
- Average journey time: 1 hour 15 minutes approx
- Service frequency: 1 return working daily
- Line used: Mugi Line

On-board services
- Class: Standard only
- Disabled access: Yes
- Sleeping arrangements: None
- Catering facilities: None
- Observation facilities: None
- Entertainment facilities: None
- Other facilities: Toilet

Technical
- Rolling stock: KiHa 185 series DMUs
- Electrification: Diesel
- Operating speed: 110 km/h (68 mph)
- Track owner: JR Shikoku

The Muroto (むろと) was a limited express service in Japan operated by JR Shikoku. It ran from Tokushima to Mugi, and continued on from Mugi to Awa-Kainan as a Local service.

The Muroto service was introduced on 13 March 1999 and discontinued on 15 March 2025.

== Route ==
Trains stopped at the following stations:

Tokushima - Awa-Tomida - Minami-Komatsushima - Hanoura - Anan - Awa-Tachibana - Kuwano - Aratano - Yuki - Hiwasa - Mugi - (Sabase) - (Asakawa) - (Awa-Kainan)

Between Mugi and Awa-Kainan, the train ran as a Local service.

== Rolling stock ==
- KiHa 185 series 2-car DMUs (1999 – 14 March 2025)

== History ==
The Muroto began as a semi express from Takamatsu to Mugi in Shikoku from 18 July 1962. From 5 March 1966, however, the name was used for express trains operating. From 13 March 1999, the name was used for limited express trains operating between Tokushima and Kaifu.

Muroto services were discontinued following the timetable revision on 15 March 2025 due to declining passengers and crew member shortages. At the time it was discontinued, only one return service per day was operated.
