= Nishibara Station =

Railway station in Anan, Tokushima Prefecture, Japan

M10 Nishibara Station 西原駅
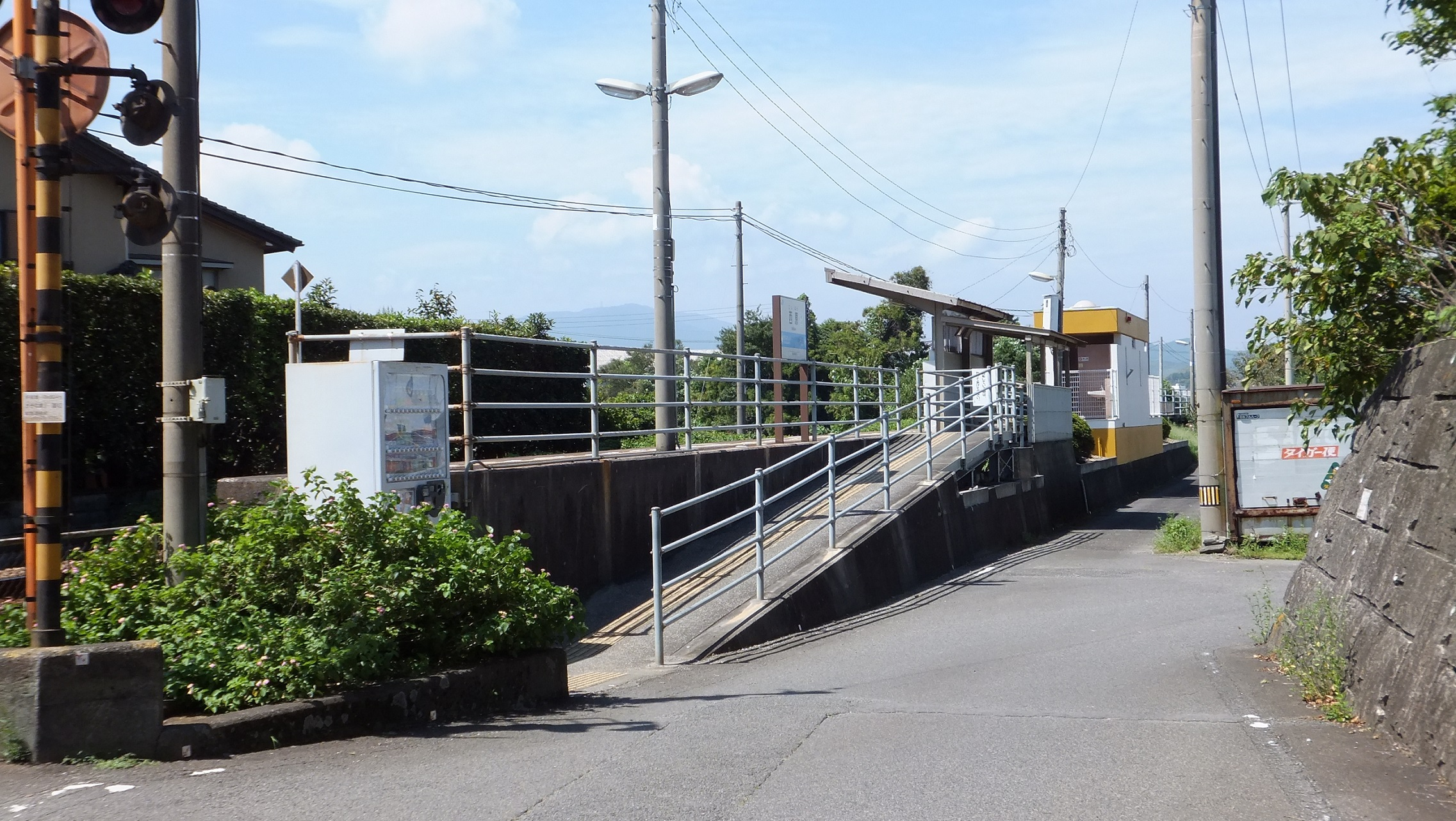
- Nishibara Station in September 2015

General information
- Location: Nakagawacho Daikyobara, Anan-shi, Tokushima-ken 779-1233; Japan
- Coordinates: 33.9483°N 134.645°E
- Operator: JR Shikoku
- Line: ■ Mugi Line
- Distance: 19.8 km from Tokushima
- Platforms: 1 side platform
- Tracks: 1

Construction
- Structure type: At grade
- Cycle facilities: Designated parking area for bicycles
- Accessible: Yes - ramp leads up to platform

Other information
- Status: Unstaffed
- Station code: M10

History
- Opened: 1 October 1964

Passengers
- FY2019: 118
Location
- Location within Tokushima Prefecture Location within Japan

Nishibara Station (西原駅, Nishibara-eki) is a passenger railway station located in the city of Anan, Tokushima Prefecture, Japan. It is operated by JR Shikoku and has the station number "M10".

== Lines ==
Nishibara Station is served by the Mugi Line and is located 19.8 km from the beginning of the line at Tokushima. All trains stop at this station.

== Layout ==
The station consists of a side platform serving a single track. There is no station building, only a shelter on the platform and a separate toilet building. A ramp leads up to the platform from the access road. A designated parking area for bicycles is provided, underneath a nearby roadbridge.

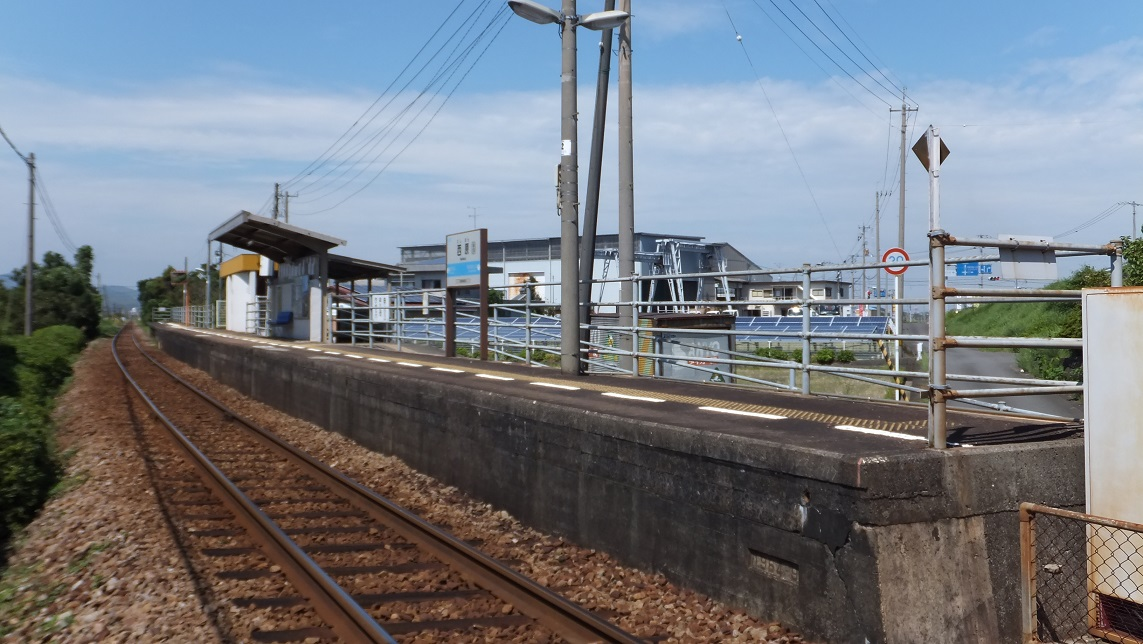
A view of the station platform and track.

== Adjacent stations ==
«	Service	»
Mugi Line
Hanoura	Local	Awa-Nakashima

== History ==
Japanese Government Railways (JGR) opened the station on 1 October 1964 as an added station on the existing track of the Mugi Line. On 1 April 1987, with the privatization of Japanese National Railways (JNR), the successor of JGR, control of the station passed to JR Shikoku.

== Passenger statistics ==
In fiscal 2019, the station was used by an average of 118 passengers daily.

== Surrounding area ==
- Nakagawa Sunflower Nursery School
- Tokushima Prefectural Road No. 27 Anan Nakagawa Line
- Tokushima Prefectural Road 128 Anan Hanoura Line
- Anan Municipal Awa Koho / Folk Museum

== See also ==
- List of railway stations in Japan
