= Byōdō-ji (Anan, Tokushima) =

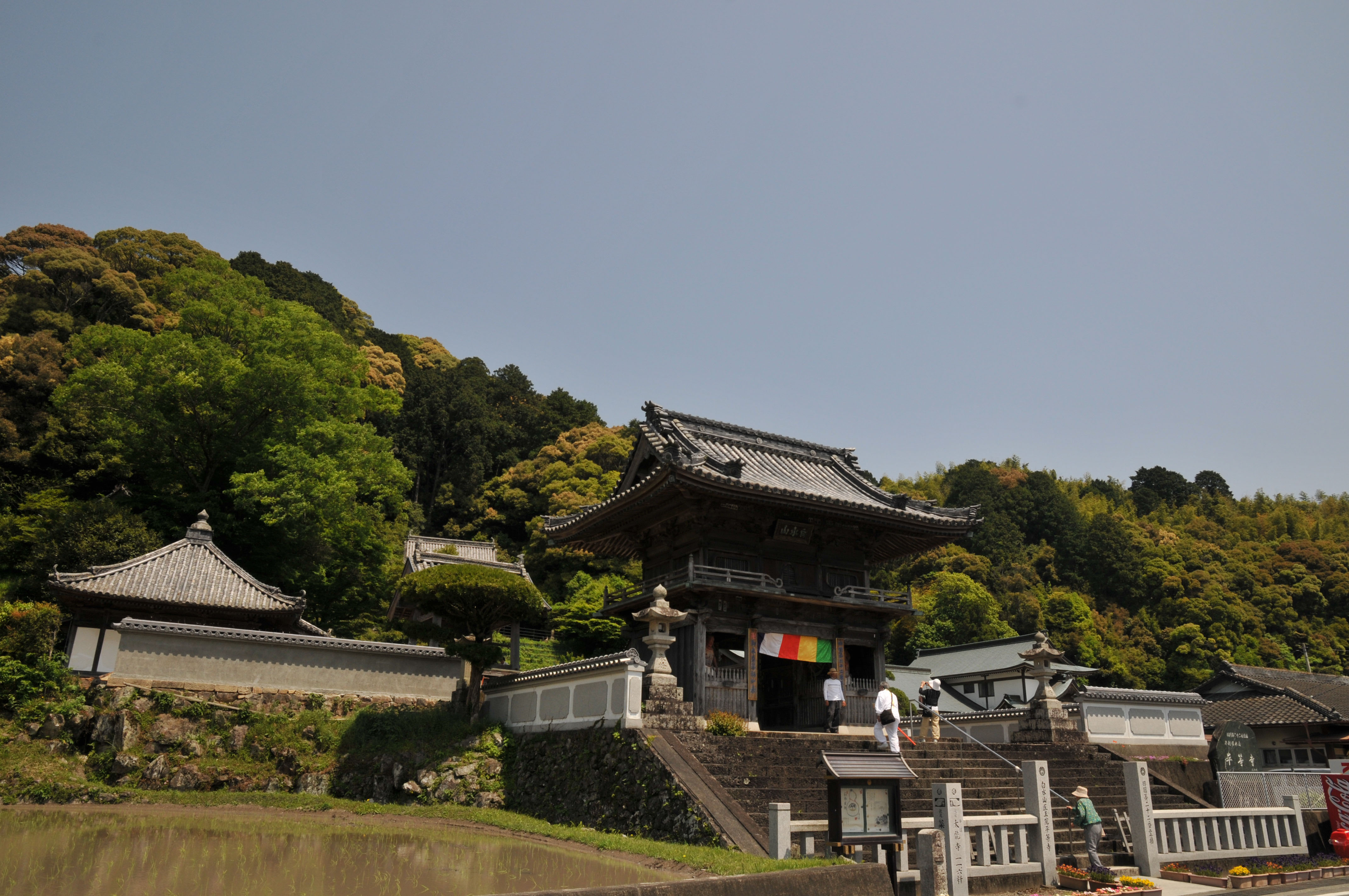

Byodo-ji (Byodo Temple literally: Equality Temple) (Japanese: 平等寺) is a Koyasan Shingon temple in Anan, Tokushima Prefecture, Japan. Temple # 22 on the Shikoku 88 temple pilgrimage. The main image is of Yakushi Nyorai (Bhaiṣajyaguru: "King of Medicine Master and Lapis Lazuli Light"). It is designated as Anan Muroto Historical Cultural Road.

== History ==
- The temple was constructed during Kōnin era.
- In the Tenshō (天正, 1573-1592) era, the temple was burned down by Chōsokabe Motochika’s (長宗我部 元親) force.
- The temple was reconstructed in the Kyōhō (享保, 1716-1736) era.

== Cultural Properties ==
The painting 'Autumn Grass, colour on paper with gold ground' (紙本金地著色秋草図) in the temple was designated tangible cultural property by Tokushima Prefecture on September 9, 1969.

== See also ==
- Shikoku 88 temple pilgrimage
