= Aratano Station =

Railway station in Anan, Tokushima Prefecture, Japan

M16 Aratano Station 新野駅
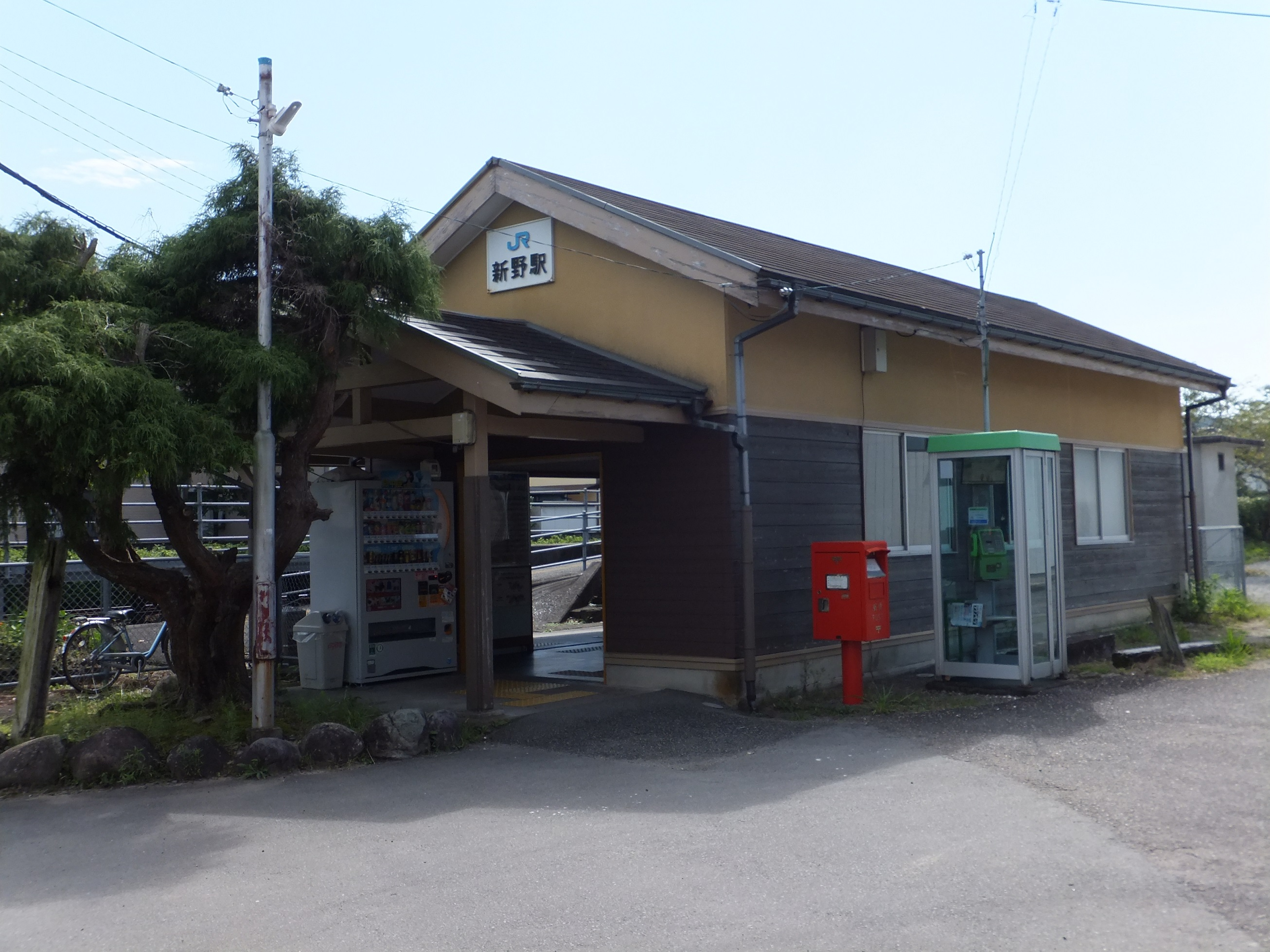
- Aratano Station in September 2015

General information
- Location: Aratanocho, Anan-shi, Tokushima-ken 779-1510; Japan
- Coordinates: 33.8468°N 134.6°E
- Operator: JR Shikoku
- Line: ■ Mugi Line
- Distance: 36.2 km from Tokushima
- Platforms: 1 side platform
- Tracks: 1

Construction
- Structure type: At grade
- Accessible: Yes - platform accessed by ramp

Other information
- Status: Unstaffed
- Station code: M16

History
- Opened: 27 June 1937

Passengers
- FY2019: 108
Location
- Location within Tokushima Prefecture Location within Japan

Aratano Station (新野駅, Aratano-eki) is a passenger railway station located in the city of Anan, Tokushima Prefecture, Japan. It is operated by JR Shikoku and has the station number "M16".

== Lines ==
Aratano Station is served by the Mugi Line and is located 32.6 km from the beginning of the line at Tokushima. As of the Muroto limited express' discontinuation in March 2025, only local trains service the line. As a result, all trains stop at this station.

== Layout ==
The station consists of a side platform serving a single track. The station building is unstaffed and serves only as a waiting room. Access to the platform is by means of a ramp from the station building.

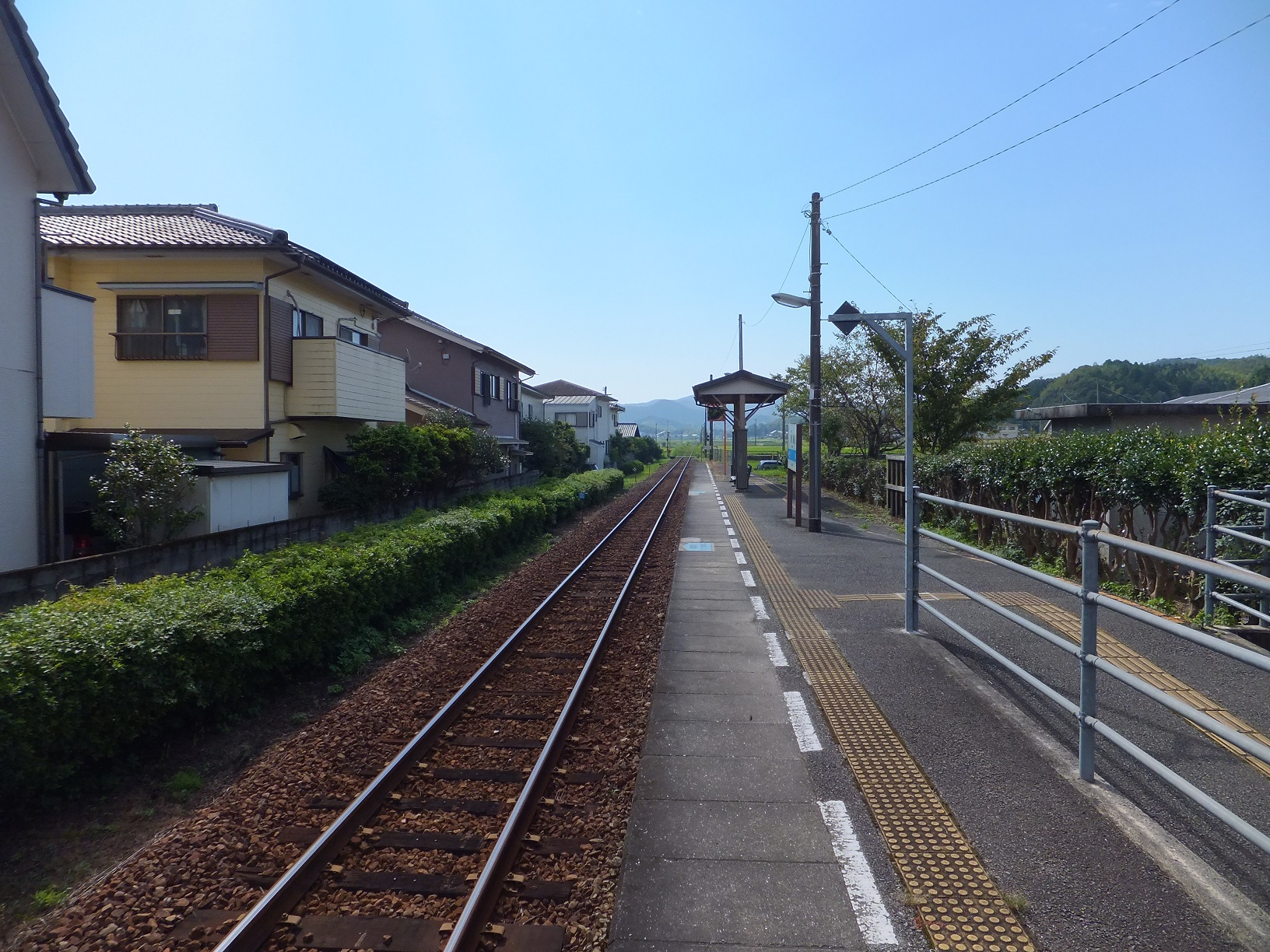
A view of the station platform and track. The ramp from the station building can be seen on the right.

== Adjacent stations ==
«	Service	»
Mugi Line
Kuwano	Local	Awa-Fukui

== History ==
Japanese Government Railways (JGR) opened Aratano Station on 27 June 1937 as an intermediate station when the Mugi Line was extended southwards from Kuwano to Awa-Fukui. On 1 April 1987, with the privatization of Japanese National Railways (JNR), the successor of JGR, JR Shikoku took over control of the station.

== Passenger statistics ==
In fiscal 2019, the station was used by an average of 108 passengers daily.

== Surrounding area ==
- Anan City Shinnohigashi Elementary School
- Tokushima Prefectural Anan Hikari High School Shinno Campus
- Byōdō-ji

== See also ==
- List of railway stations in Japan
