= Kuwano Station =

Railway station in Anan, Tokushima Prefecture, Japan

M15 Kuwano Station 桑野駅
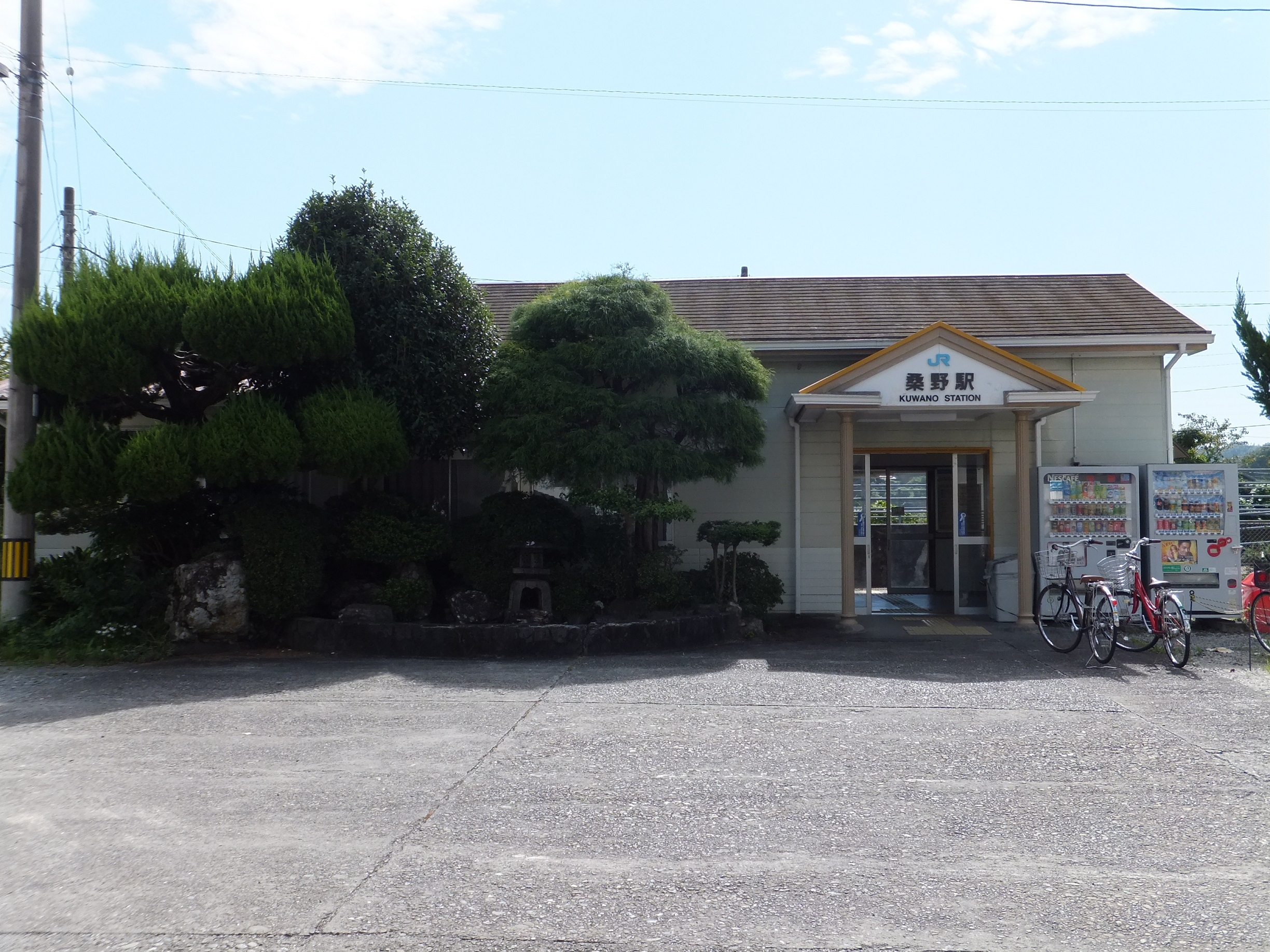
- Kuwano Station in September 2015

General information
- Location: Okamoto Kuwanochō, Anan-shi, Tokushima-ken 779-1402; Japan
- Coordinates: 33.8745°N 134.6130°E
- Operator: JR Shikoku
- Line: ■ Mugi Line
- Distance: 32.6 km from Tokushima
- Platforms: 2 side platforms
- Tracks: 2 + 1 siding

Construction
- Structure type: At grade
- Accessible: Yes - platforms linked by ramps and level crossing

Other information
- Status: Unstaffed
- Station code: M15

History
- Opened: 27 March 1936

Passengers
- FY2019: 119
Location
- Location within Tokushima Prefecture Location within Japan

Kuwano Station (桑野駅, Kuwano-eki) is a passenger railway station located in the city of Anan, Tokushima Prefecture, Japan. It is operated by JR Shikoku and has the station number "M15".

== Lines ==
Kuwano Station is served by the Mugi Line and is located 32.6 km from the beginning of the line at Tokushima. As of the Muroto limited express' discontinuation in March 2025, only local trains service the line. As a result, all trains stop at this station.

== Layout ==
The station consists of two opposed side platforms serving two tracks. The station building is unstaffed and serves only as a waiting room. Access to the opposite platform is by means of a level crossing with ramps at both ends. A siding branches off track 1 and ends near the station building.

=== Platforms ===
1	■ Mugi Line	for Anan and Tokushima
2	■ Mugi Line	for Mugi and Awa-Kainan

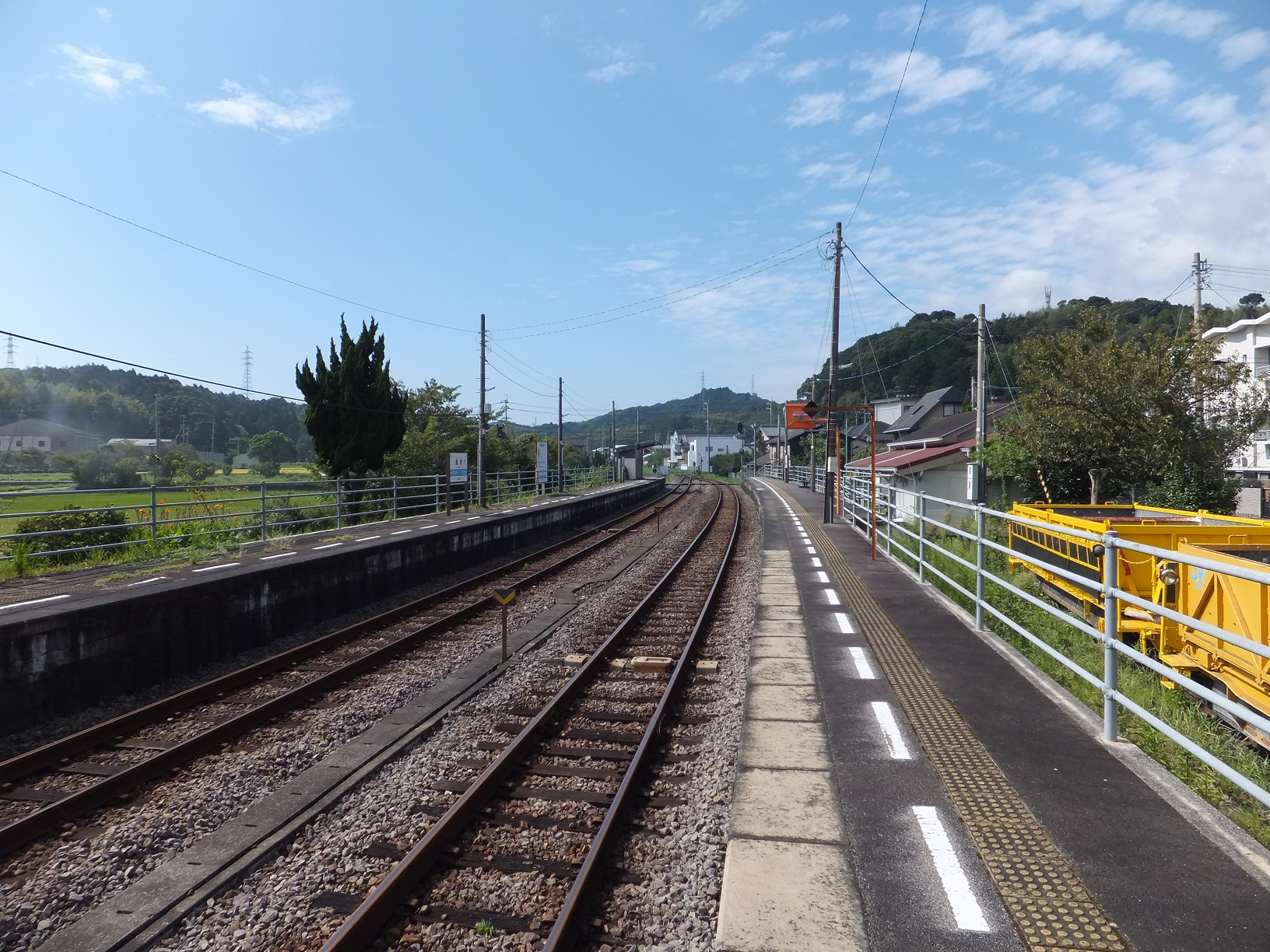
A view of the station platforms and tracks in 2015. Platform 2 is to the left. Track maintenance vehicles can be seen on the siding to the right.

== Adjacent stations ==
«	Service	»
Mugi Line
Awa-Tachibana	Local	Aratano

== History ==
Japanese Government Railways (JGR) opened Kuwano Station on 27 March 1936 during the first phase of the construction of the Mugi Line when a track was built from Hanoura to here. On 1 April 1987, with the privatization of Japanese National Railways (JNR), the successor of JGR, JR Shikoku took over control of the station.

== Passenger statistics ==
In fiscal 2019, the station was used by an average of 119 passengers daily.

== Surrounding area ==
- Anan City Hall Kuwano Resident Center
- Anan City Kuwano Elementary School
- Anan Municipal Anan Daini Junior High School

== See also ==
- List of railway stations in Japan
