= Muroto-Anan Kaigan Quasi-National Park =

Quasi-National Park in Japan

Muroto-Anan Quasi-National Park
- 室戸阿南海岸国定公園
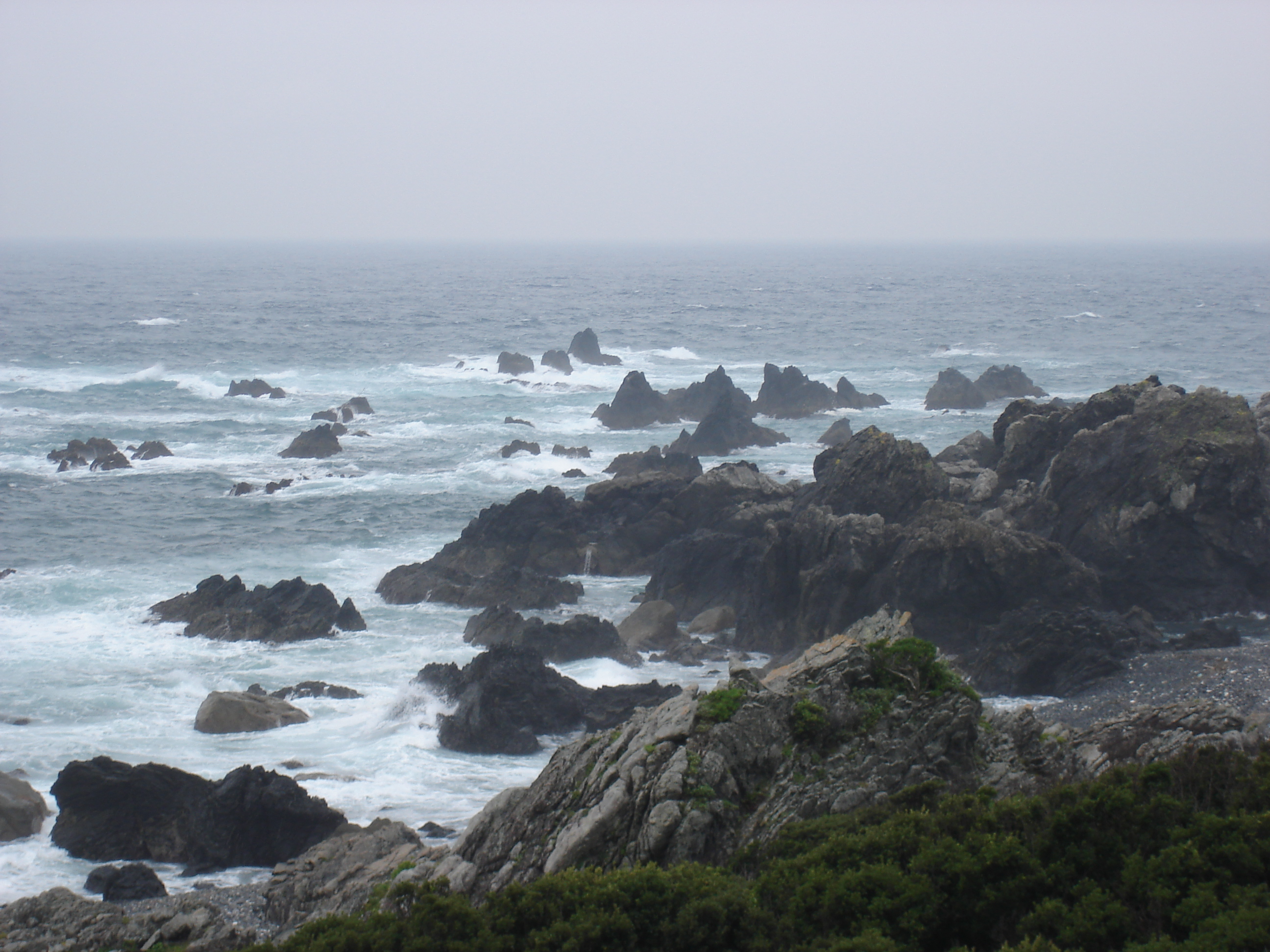
- Cape Muroto

- Location within Japan
- Location: Kōchi/Tokushima Prefecture, Japan
- Coordinates: 33°34′59″N 134°22′48″E
- Area: 72.2 km^{2} (27.9 sq mi)
- Established: June 1, 1964

Muroto-Anan Quasi-National Park (室戸阿南海岸国定公園, Muroto-Anan Kokutei Kōen) is a Quasi-National Park on the coast of Kōchi Prefecture and Tokushima Prefecture, Japan. It was founded on 1 June 1964 and has an area of 72.2 km^{2} (27.9 sq mi).

== See also ==
- List of national parks of Japan
