= Hanoura Station =

Railway station in Anan, Tokushima Prefecture, Japan

M09 Hanoura Station 羽ノ浦駅
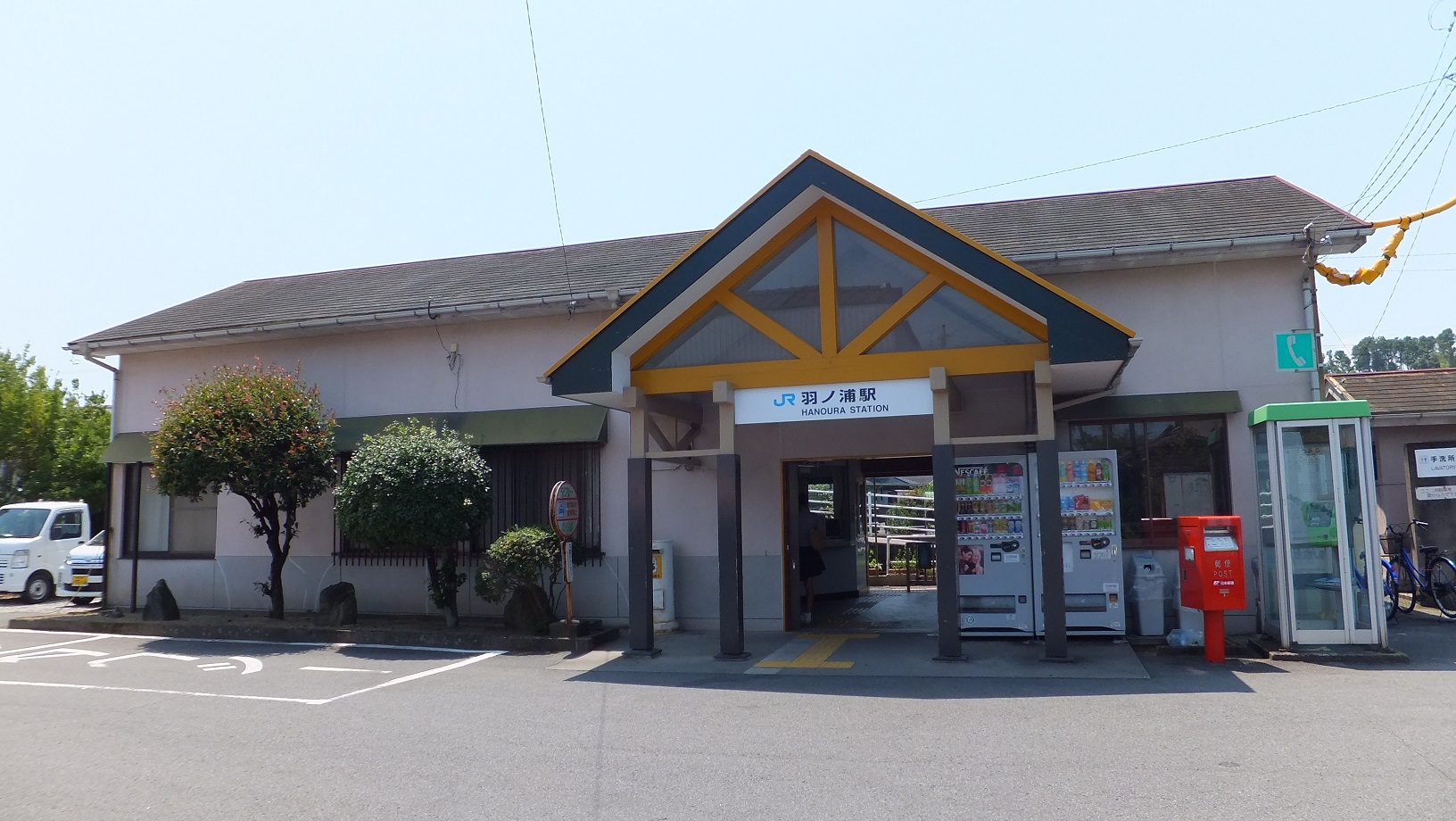
- Hanoura Station in August 2015

General information
- Location: Hanouraiuchi Hanourachō Miyagura, Anan-shi, Tokushima-ken 779-1102; Japan
- Coordinates: 33.9578°N 134.6250°E
- Operator: JR Shikoku
- Line: ■ Mugi Line
- Distance: 17.7 km from Tokushima
- Platforms: 1 island platform
- Tracks: 2 + 1 passing loop and 1 siding

Construction
- Structure type: At grade
- Accessible: Yes - platform accessed by ramp and level crossing

Other information
- Status: Staffed - JR ticket window
- Station code: M09

History
- Opened: 15 December 1916

Passengers
- FY2019: 1036
Location
- Location within Tokushima Prefecture Location within Japan

Hanoura Station (羽ノ浦駅, Hanoura-eki) is a passenger railway station in the city of Anan, Tokushima Prefecture, Japan. It is operated by JR Shikoku and has the station number "M09".

== Lines ==
Hanoura Station is served by the Mugi Line and is located 17.7 km from the beginning of the line at Tokushima. As of the Muroto limited express' discontinuation in March 2025, only local trains service the line. As a result, all trains stop at this station.

== Layout ==
The station consists of an island platform serving two tracks. The station building houses a waiting room and a JR ticket window (without a Midori no Madoguchi facility). Access to the island platform is by means of a level crossing and ramp. A passing loop and siding branch off track 2.

=== Platforms ===
1	■ Mugi Line	for Anan and Mugi
2	■ Mugi Line	for Tokushima and Takamatsu

== Adjacent stations ==
«	Service	»
Mugi Line
Tatsue	Local	Nishibara

== History ==
Hanoura Station was opened on 15 December 1916 along a stretch of track laid down by the privately run Anan Railway (阿南鉄道, Anan Tetsudo) from Chūden to Hanoura and Furushō. On 27 March 1936, Japanese Government Railways (JGR) built the first stretch of the Mugi Line linking up Hanoura with Kuwano. On 1 July 1936, the Anan Railway was nationalized and the track from Chūden to Hanoura became part of the Mugi Line. The track to Furushō became a branch line. Passenger services were stopped and it was used for freight only. Freight operations stopped on 1 Jul 1943, restarted on 10 May 1950 and finally ceased altogether on 1 April 1961. Thereafter the branch line track was removed.

On 1 April 1987, with the privatization of Japanese National Railways (JNR), the successor of JGR, JR Shikoku took over control of Hanoura Station.

== Passenger statistics ==
In fiscal 2019, the station was used by an average of 1036 passengers daily.

== Surrounding area ==
- Anan City Hall Hanoura Branch
- Anan City Hanoura Library
- Anan City Hanoura Public Hall
- Anan City Hanoura Elementary School
- Anan City Hanoura Junior High School

== See also ==
- List of railway stations in Japan
