= Cyprus mutiny =

1829 takeover of British ship in Australia

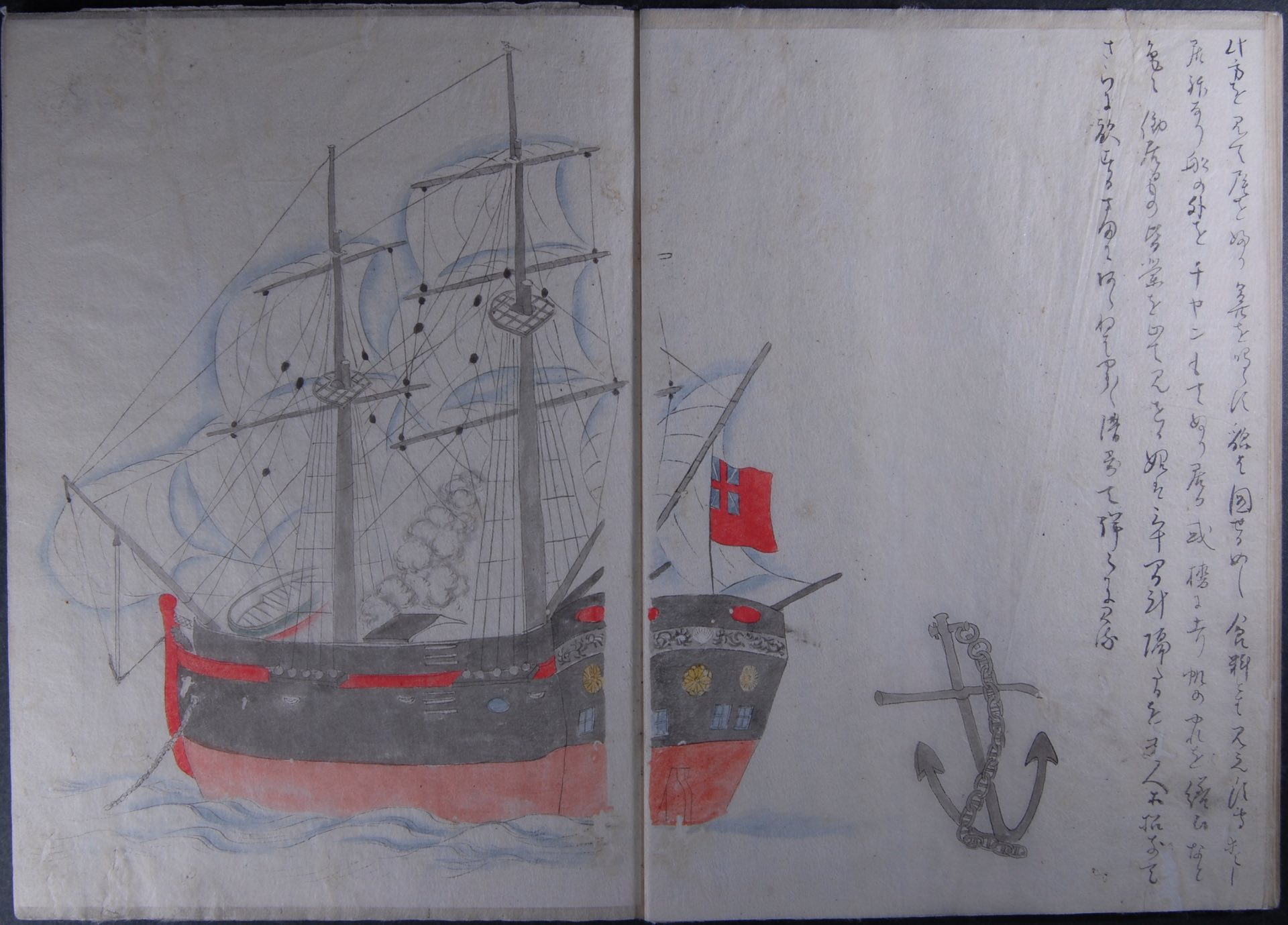
- Japanese watercolour from 1830 depicting a British-flagged ship believed to be the brig Cyprus
Date	August 1829
Location	Recherche Bay, Tasmania
Result	Successful mutiny

Belligerents
Convict insurgents	Crew of Cyprus

Commanders and leaders
William Swallow	Lieutenant Carew

The Cyprus mutiny took place on 14 August 1829 in Recherche Bay off the British penal settlement of Van Diemen's Land (now Tasmania, Australia). Convicts seized the brig Cyprus and sailed her to Canton, China, where they scuttled her and claimed to be castaways from another vessel. On the way, Cyprus visited Japan during the height of the period of severe Japanese restrictions on the entry of foreigners, the first ship from Australia to do so.

Several of the mutineers were eventually captured. Two of them, George James Davis and William Watts, were hanged at Execution Dock, London on 16 December 1830, the last men hanged for piracy in Britain. Their leader, William Swallow, was never convicted of piracy because he convinced the British authorities that, as the only experienced sailor, he had been forced to remain onboard and coerced to navigate the ship. Swallow was instead sentenced to life on Van Diemen's Land for escaping, where he died four years later.

Swallow wrote an account of the voyage including the visit to Japan, but this part of the journey was generally dismissed as fantasy until 2017, when he was vindicated by an amateur historian's discovery that the account matched Japanese records of a "barbarian" ship flying a British flag whose origins had remained a mystery for 187 years.

== Mutiny ==
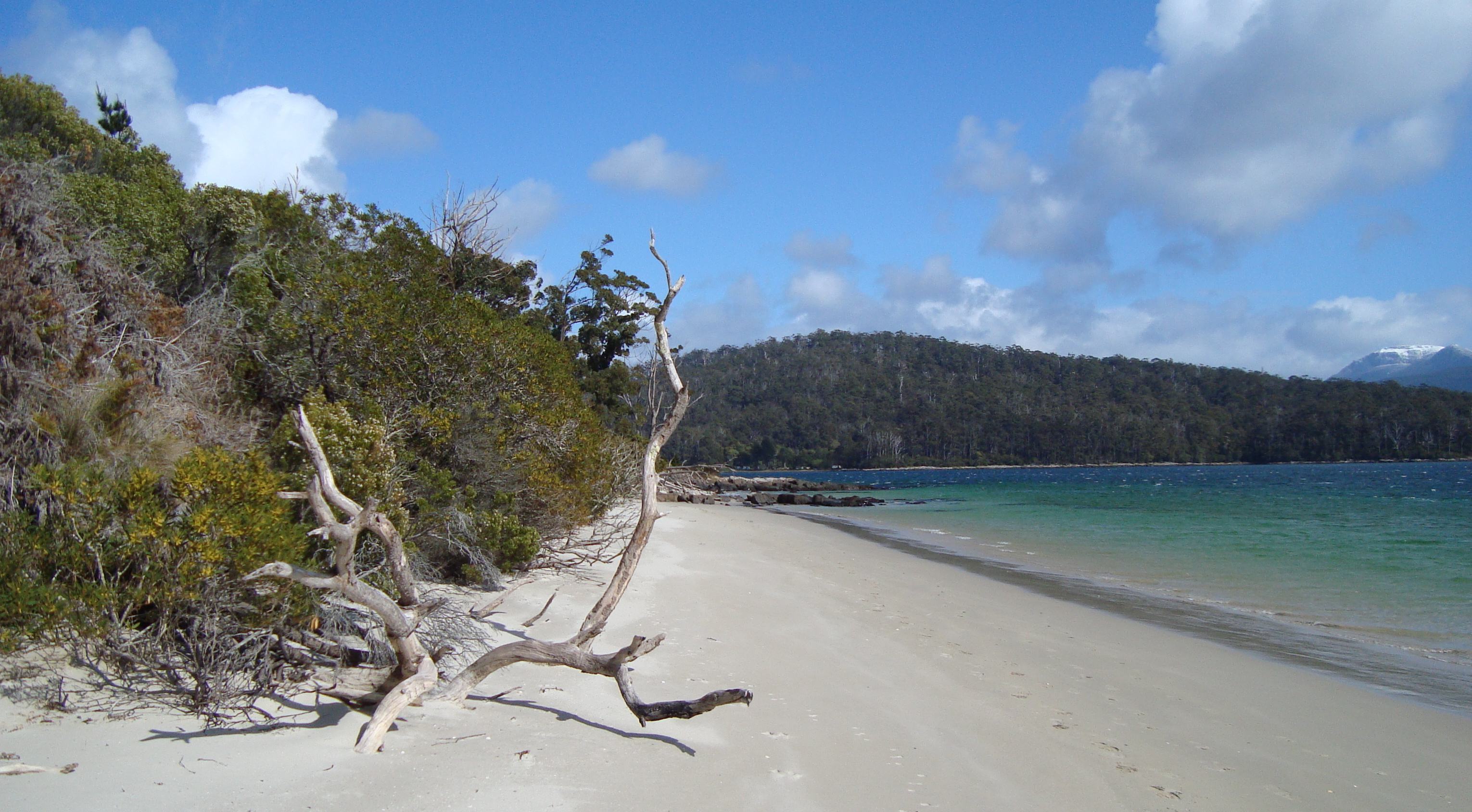
Recherche Bay, Tasmania, where the convicts took control of the brig

On 6 August 1829, the brig Cyprus, a government-owned vessel used to transport goods, people, and convicts, set sail from Hobart Town for Macquarie Harbour Penal Station on a routine voyage carrying supplies and convicts under a guard commanded by Lieutenant Carew, a British Army officer. There were 62 people on board, including wives and children of some personnel, and 31 convicts.

On reaching Recherche Bay, isolated from the main settlement, the vessel was becalmed. Convicts allowed on deck attacked their guards and took control of the brig. The convicts marooned officers, soldiers, and convicts who did not join the mutiny in Recherche Bay, without supplies. They were saved by a convict called Popjoy who constructed a makeshift boat or coracle using only the three pocket-knives they had, and sailed to Partridge Island with Morgan, a free man, where they got help.

== Pacific voyage ==
Nineteen convicts sailed away in Cyprus, having appointed one of their number, William Swallow, the only one with sailing experience, as sailing master. The mutineers first sailed to New Zealand, and then on to the Chatham Islands. There they plundered the schooner Samuel of the seal skins her crew had gathered. From the Islands, Cyprus sailed for Tahiti, but then changed destination to Tonga. The mutineers landed at Keppel's Island, where Ferguson, the leader, and six others decided to remain. Swallow then sailed to Japan. (Note: Swallow's account of Cyprus's visit was questioned, and even rejected for lack of corroborating evidence. However in 2017 this account was compared with Japanese records of a visit by a British vessel off the town of Mugi, Tokushima on Shikoku island in 1830, and the accounts matched in many points.)

== Visit to Japan ==
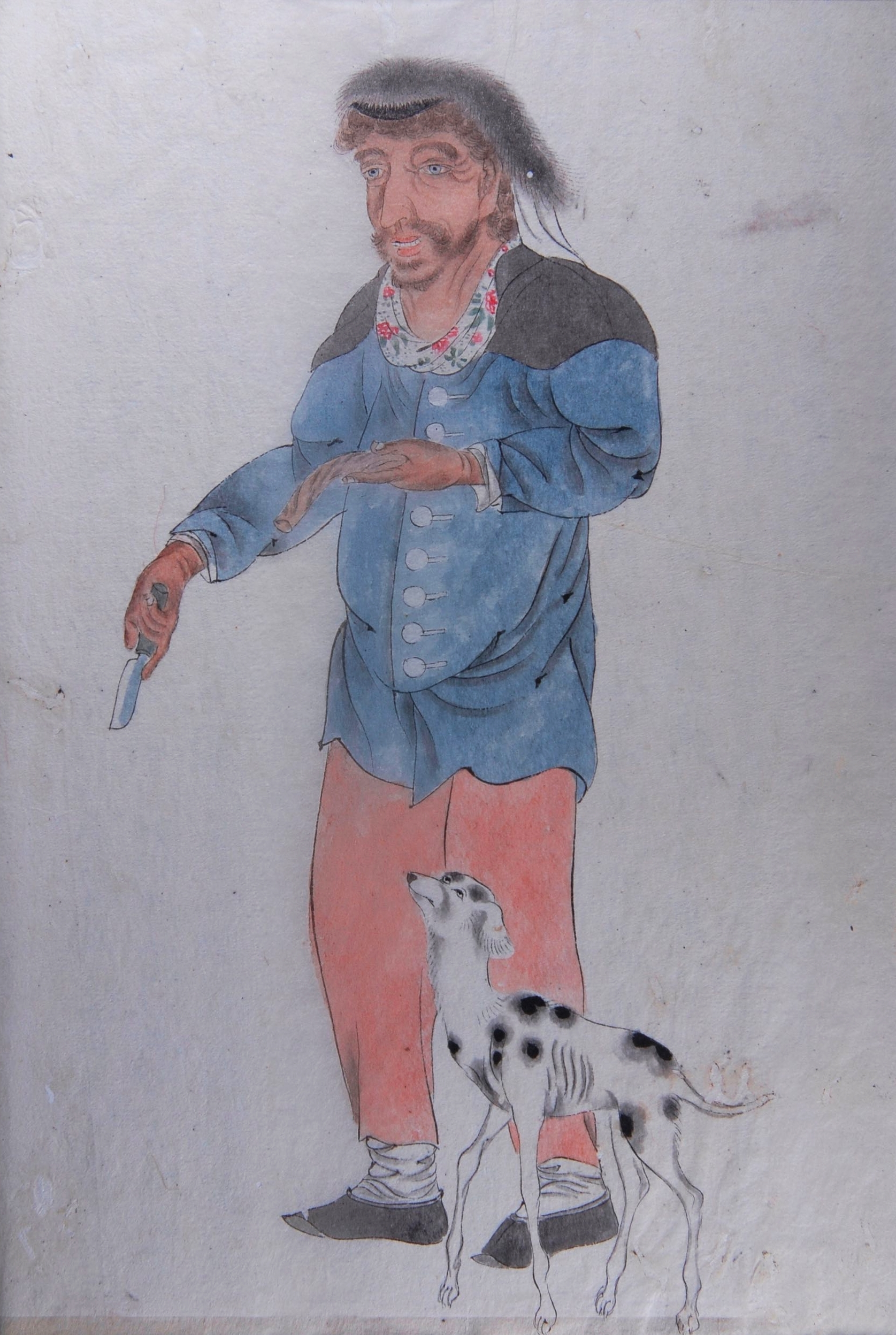
A watercolour by samurai Makita Hamaguchi showing one of the mutineers with a dog from the ship

Swallow wrote an account of the voyage which included a visit to Japan before reaching Canton; this was generally dismissed as fantasy. However, in 2017 this account was compared with Japanese records of a visit by a British vessel off the town of Mugi, Tokushima on Shikoku in 1830, and matched in many points.

Makita Hamaguchi, a local samurai went disguised as a fisherman to check the ship for weapons, wrote an account of the episode which included watercolour sketches of the ship and its crew. Another samurai chronicler called Hirota noted the crew offered gifts, including an object he later drew which has since been identified as a boomerang. The mutineers were desperately low on water, firewood, and supplies, but were attacked and sent away by the Japanese, in line with the isolationist policy of the time.

Warwick Hirst, former curator of manuscripts at the State Library of New South Wales, said that there were "too many coincidences for it not to be true"; Takashi Tokuno, chief curator at the archive of Tokushima Prefecture, Japan, said there is a "high probability" the ship in Japanese records was Cyprus.

== East China Sea voyage ==
From Japan Cyprus sailed to the Ladrones. There four more of the mutineers left the ship. Swallow sailed on to Canton. Eventually, the mutineers scuttled Cyprus near Canton and claimed that they were castaways from another vessel. Swallow and three others worked their passage back to Britain aboard the East Indiaman Charles Grant. However, a man the mutineers had left in Canton confessed and by chance his account reached Britain a week before Swallow and his last three companions arrived there.

== Trial ==
The mutineers were tried in London and two of them, George James Davis and William Watts, were hanged in that city at Execution Dock on 16 December 1830, the last men hanged for piracy in Britain. Swallow, and two others, were returned to Hobart, where another one named James Camm was hanged. Swallow died at the penal colony of Port Arthur.

== Media ==
The mutiny is the subject of the Australian folk song "Cyprus Brig". Simon Barnard's book Gaolbird: The True Story of William Swallow, Convict and Pirate, is a fictionalised account of the mutiny in which the mutineers are depicted as birds.

A fictional account of William Swallow's mutiny of the brig Cyprus, has also been depicted in the novel Swallow by Alexandria Burnham, published by WestWords Books.

== See also ==
- Badger escape – Vandemonian convicts who stole a government-owned schooner in 1833 and sailed to Macau, China
- Frederick escape – 1834 incident where Australian convicts stole a government ship and escaped to Chile
