= Execution Dock =

Site of executions in Wapping, London

Coordinates: 51°30′12″N 0°03′26″W

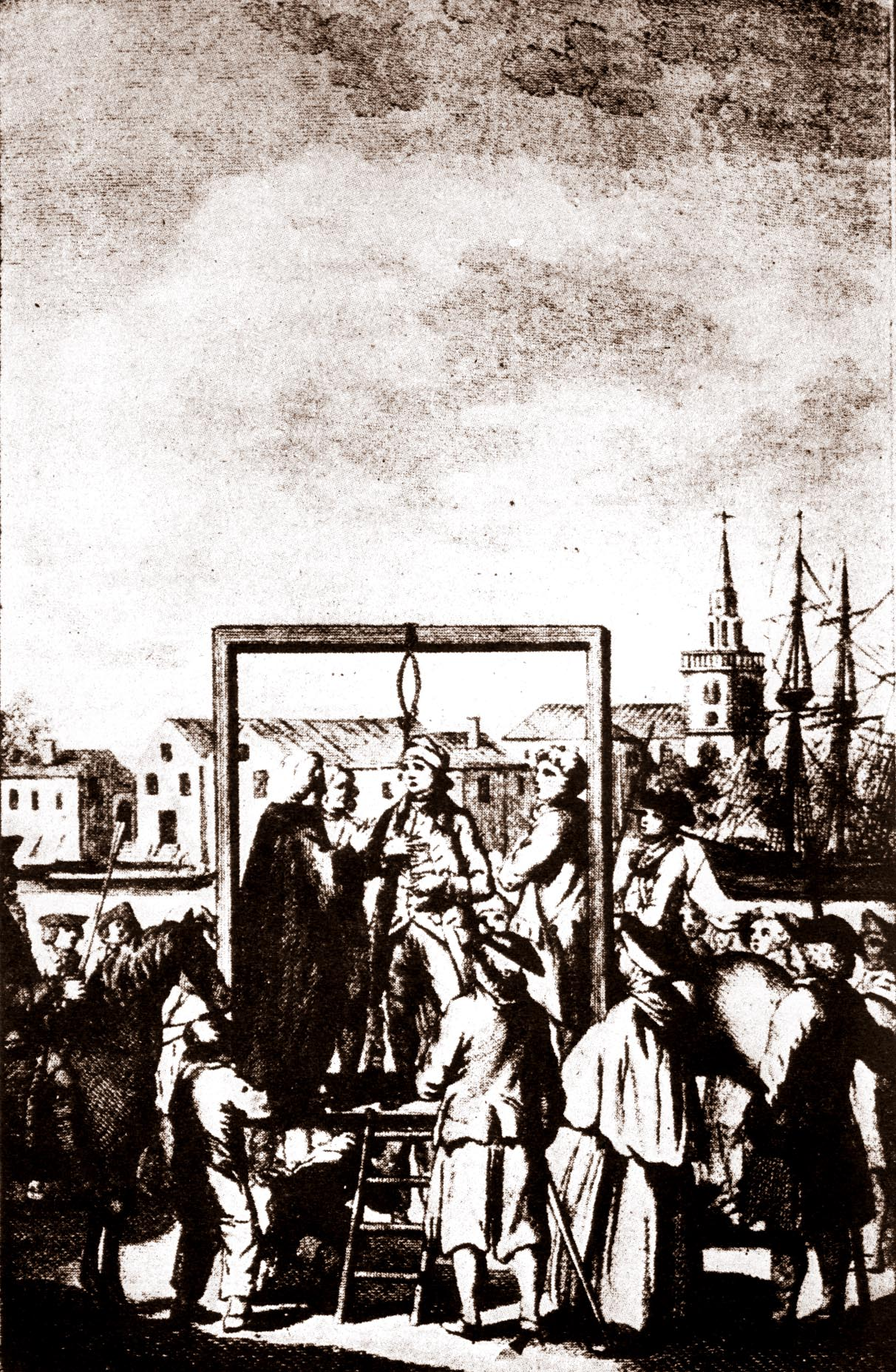
Hanging of a buccaneer at Execution Dock

Execution Dock was a site on the River Thames near the shoreline at Wapping, London, that was used for more than 400 years to execute pirates, smugglers and mutineers who had been sentenced to death by Admiralty courts. The "dock" consisted of a scaffold for hanging. The last executions at this site were in 1830.

== History ==
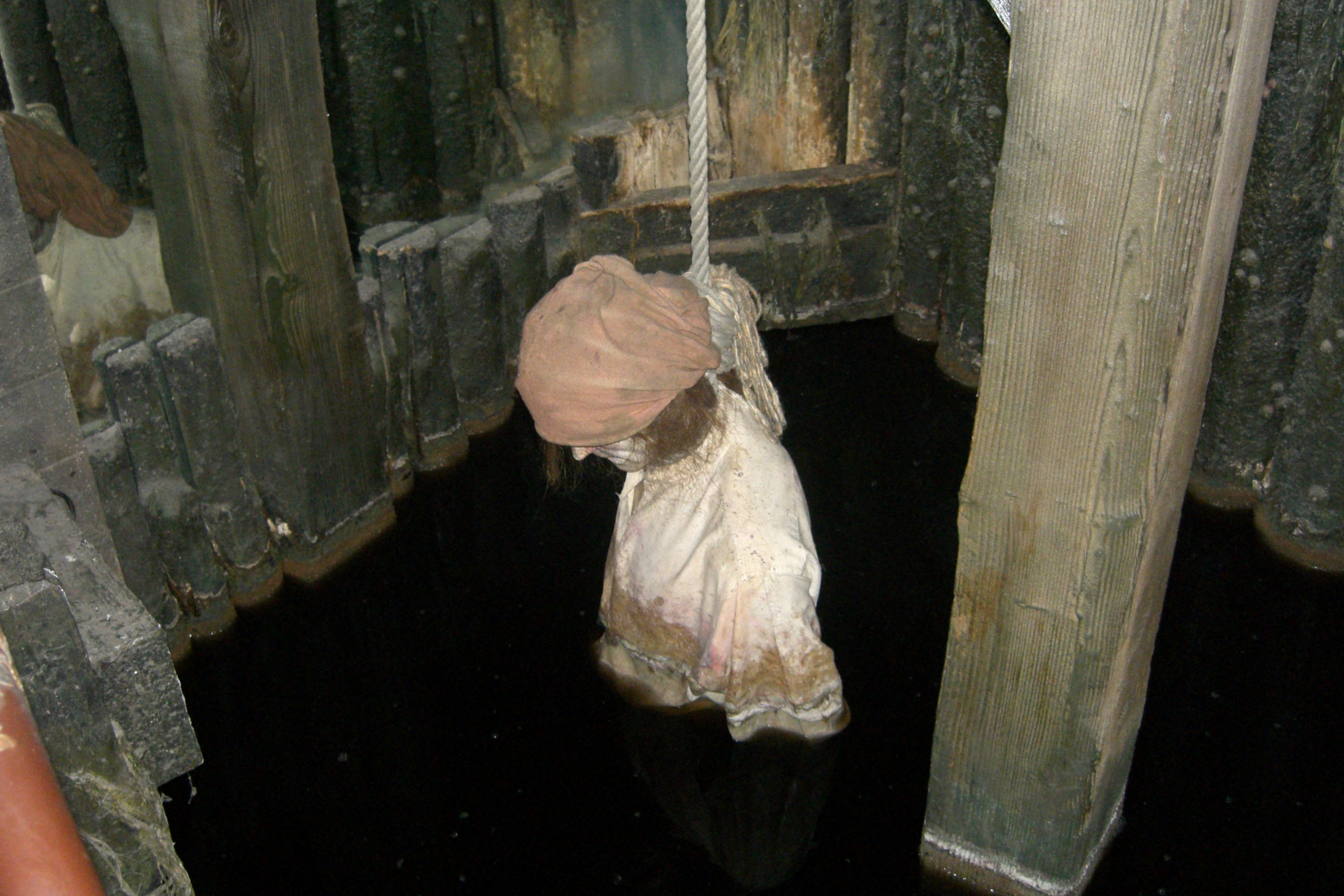
Wax figure of a pirate hanged at Execution Dock. Madame Tussauds, London

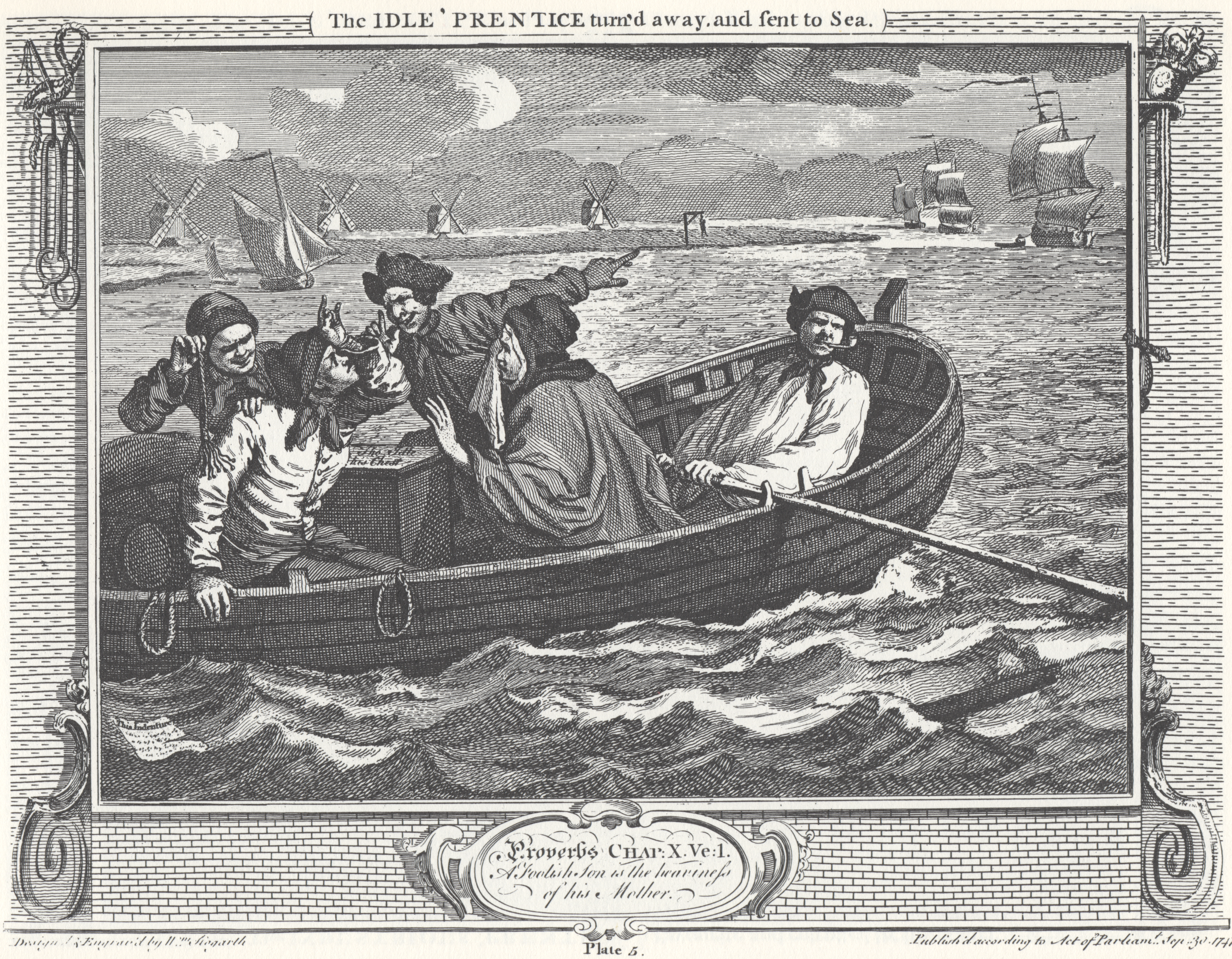
Tom Idle goes to sea; execution beside the river in the background

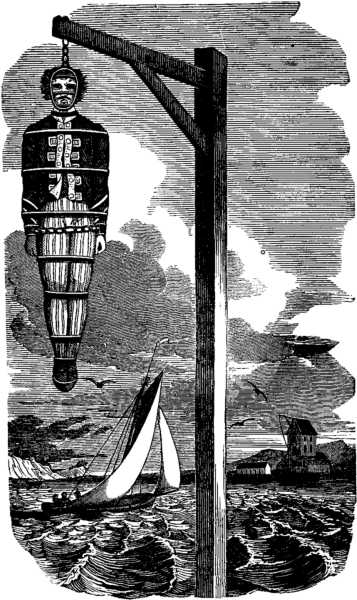
Captain Kidd, gibbeted near Tilbury in Essex, following his execution in 1701.

The British Admiralty's legal jurisdiction was for all crimes committed at sea. The dock symbolised that jurisdiction by being located just beyond the low-tide mark in the river. Anybody who had committed crimes on the seas, either in home waters or abroad, would eventually be brought back to London and tried by the High Court of the Admiralty.

Capital punishment was applied to acts of mutiny that resulted in death, for murders on the High Seas, and specific violations of the Articles of War governing the behaviour of naval sailors, including sodomy. Those sentenced to death were usually brought to Execution Dock from Marshalsea Prison (although some were also transported from Newgate Prison). The condemned were paraded across London Bridge and past the Tower of London. The procession was led by the High Court Marshal (or his deputy) on horseback. He carried a silver oar that represented the authority of the Admiralty. Prisoners were transported in a cart to Wapping; with them was a chaplain who encouraged them to confess their sins. Just like the execution procession to Tyburn, condemned prisoners were allowed to drink a quart of ale at a public house on the way to the gallows. An execution at the dock usually meant that crowds lined the river's banks or chartered boats moored in the Thames to get a better view of the hanging. Executions were conducted by the hangmen who worked at either Tyburn or Newgate Prison.

With a particular cruelty reserved for those convicted of acts of piracy, hanging was done with a shortened rope. This meant a slow death from strangulation on the scaffold as the drop was insufficient to break the prisoner's neck. It was called the Marshal's dance because their limbs would often be seen to 'dance' from slow asphyxiation. Unlike hangings on land, such as at Tyburn, the bodies of pirates at Execution Dock were not immediately cut down following death. Customarily, these corpses were left hanging until at least three tides had washed over their heads. This practice stopped at the end of the 18th century. In the cases of the most notorious offenders, the Admiralty would order that their bodies be tarred and hung in chains at either Cuckold's Point or Blackwall Point, on the River Thames, as a warning to all seafarers of the fate awaiting those who turned to piracy.

An account from The Gentleman's Magazine, dated 4 February 1796, gives a vivid portrayal of a typical execution at London's Execution Dock.

This morning, a little after ten o'clock, Colley, Cole, and Blanche, the three sailors convicted of the murder of Captain Little, were brought out of Newgate, and conveyed in solemn procession to Execution Dock, there to receive the punishment awarded by law. On the cart on which they rode was an elevated stage; on this were seated Colley, the principal instigator in the murder, in the middle, and his two wretched instruments, the Spaniard Blanche, and the Mulatto Cole, on each side of him; and behind, on another seat, two executioners.

Colley seemed in a state resembling that of a man stupidly intoxicated, and scarcely awake, and the two discovered little sensibility on this occasion, nor to the last moment of their existence, did they, as we hear, make any confession. They were turned off about a quarter before twelve in the midst of an immense crowd of spectators.

On the way to the place of execution, they were preceded by the Marshall of the Admiralty in his carriage, the Deputy Marshall, bearing the silver oar, and the two City Marshals on horseback, Sheriff's officers, etc. The whole cavalcade was conducted with great solemnity.

The infamous Captain Kidd, who had been convicted of piracy and murder, was taken from Newgate Prison and executed at the dock in 1701. During his execution, the rope broke and Kidd was hanged on the second attempt. His remains were gibbeted by the river Thames at Tilbury for three years.

George Davis and William Watts, convicted for piracy for the Cyprus mutiny, were the final hangings at the dock on 16 December 1830.

Execution Dock was also popular in literature. Proof of this is the classic tale Peter Pan, in which the infamous Captain Hook's crew was said about them, "A more villainous-looking lot never hung in a row on Execution dock."

== Location ==
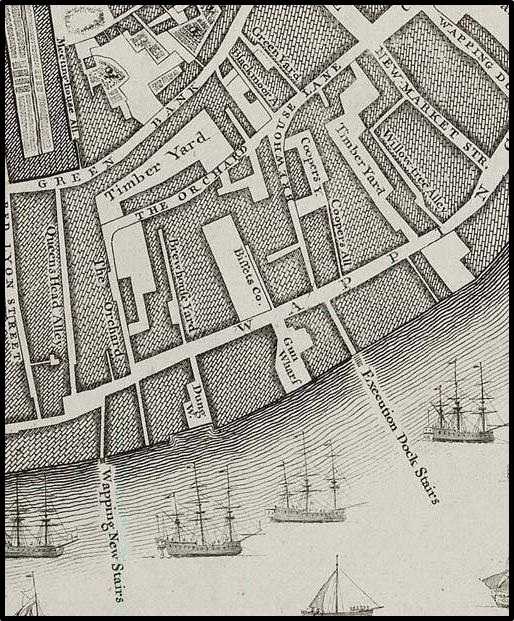
Rocque's map of 1746 showing location of Execution Dock Stairs at Wapping, east London

Some sources claim there is a large "E" on the Thames side of the building at Swan Wharf, indicating the site of Execution Dock. Another source claims it was approximately where the London Overground station now stands. Execution Dock actually lies at the foot of Brewhouse Lane, just south of Wapping High Street.
