= Mugi, Tokushima =

Mugi 牟岐町
- Town
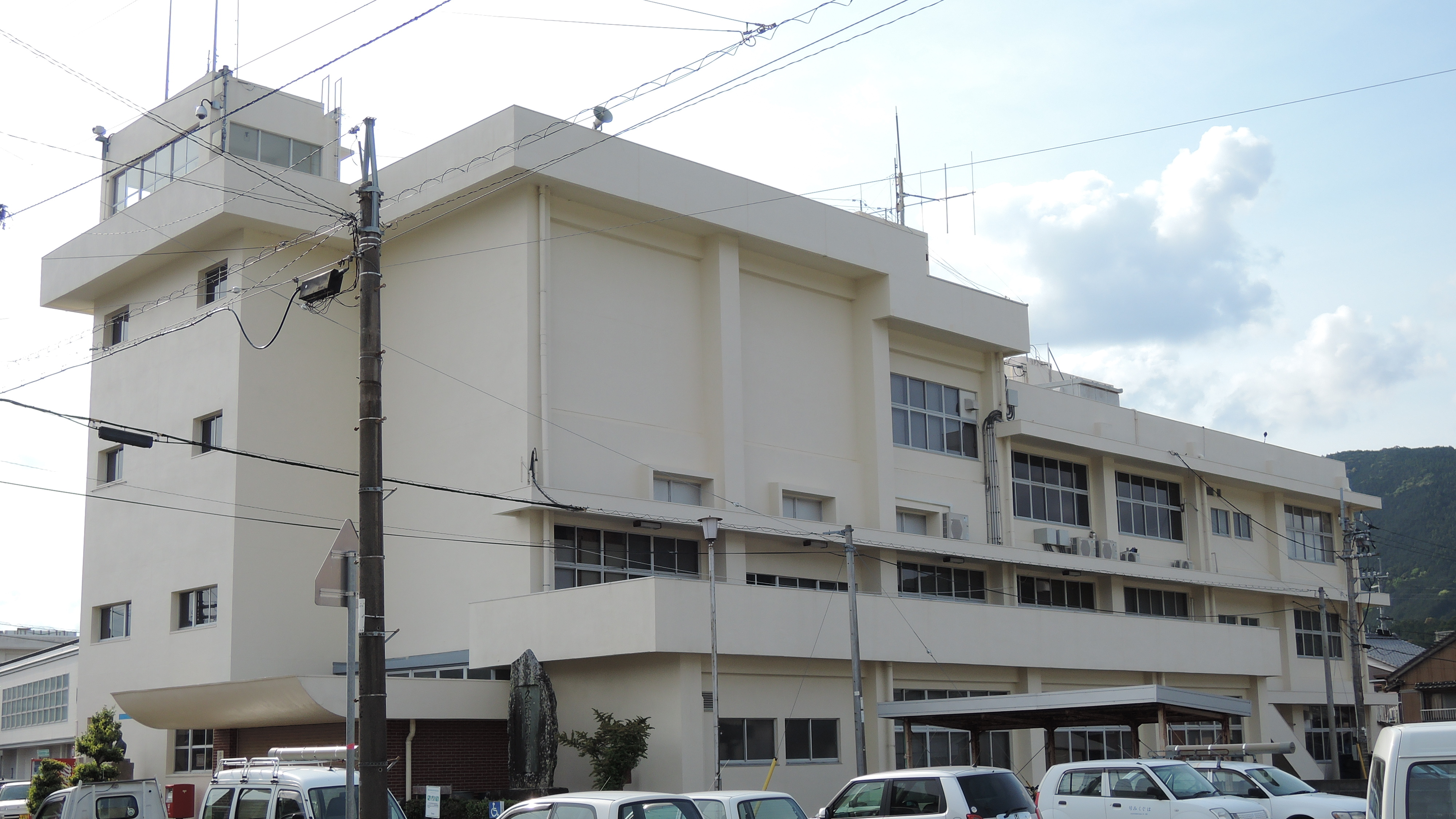
- Mugi Town Hall

- Flag Emblem
- Location of Mugi in Tokushima Prefecture

- Location in Japan
- Coordinates: 33°40′N 134°25′E
- Country: Japan
- Region: Shikoku
- Prefecture: Tokushima
- District: Kaifu

Government
  - Mayor: Osamu Masutomi

Area
  - Total: 56.62 km^{2} (21.86 sq mi)

Population (June 30, 2022)
  - Total: 3,734
  - Density: 65.95/km^{2} (170.8/sq mi)
- Time zone: UTC+09:00 (JST)
- City hall address: 7-4 Honson, Nakamura, Oaza, Mugi-cho, Kaifu-gun, Tokushima-ken 775-8570
- Website: Official website
- Symbols
- Bird: Japanese white-eye
- Flower: Crinum
- Tree: Tachibana orange

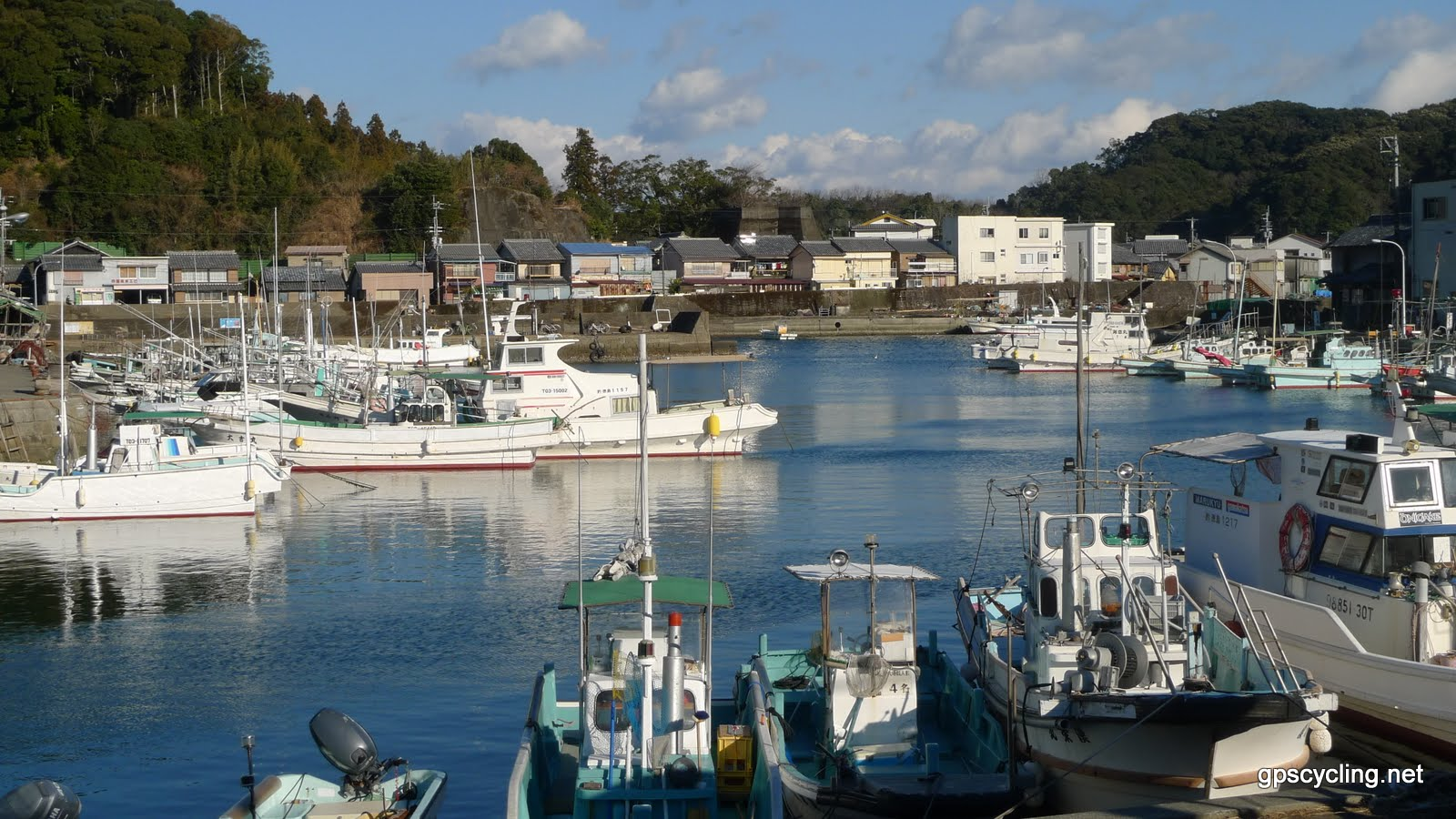
Mugi Nakamura fishing port

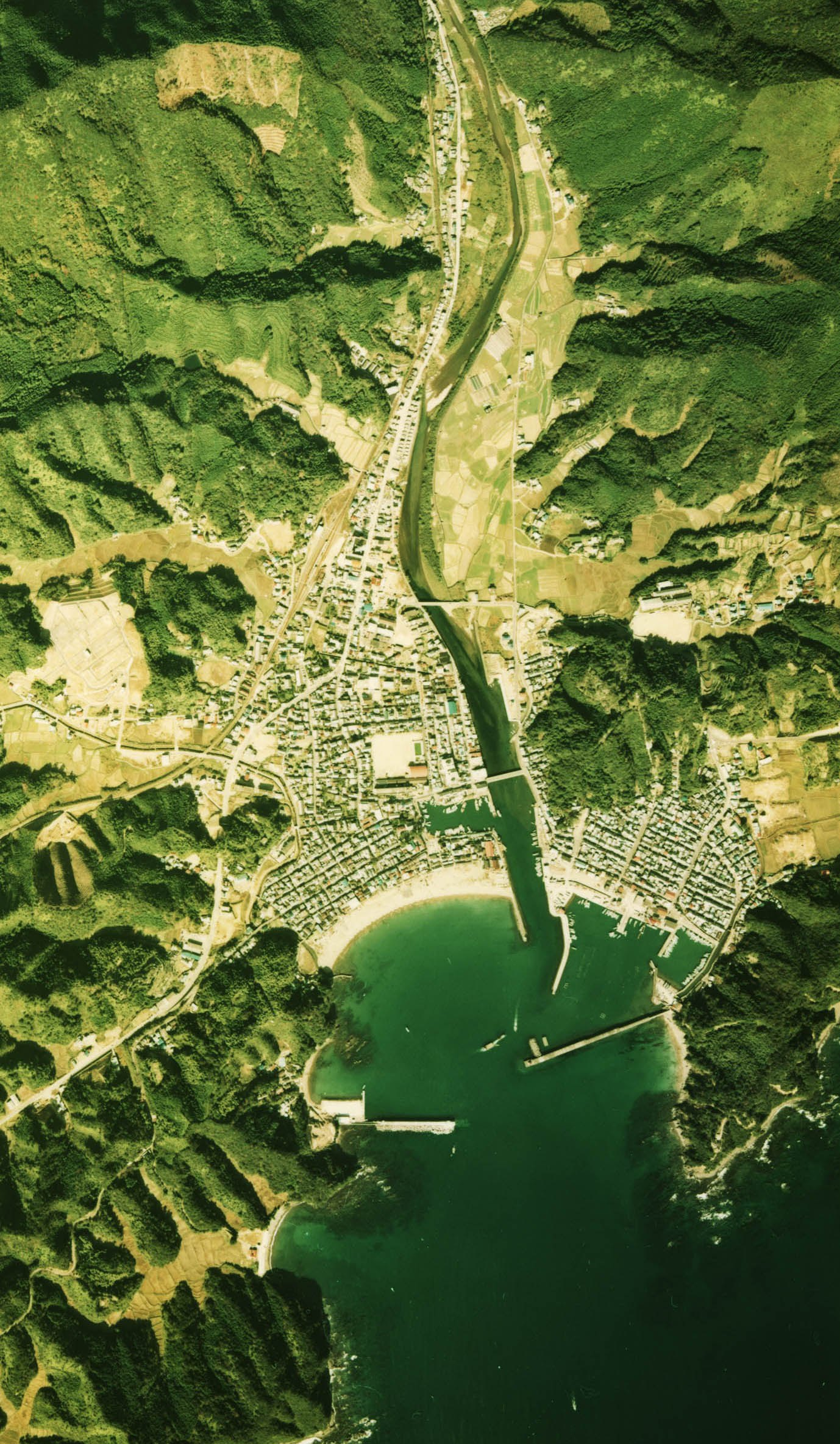
Aerial view of Mugi

Mugi (牟岐町, Mugi-chō) is a town located in Kaifu District, Tokushima Prefecture, Japan. As of 30 June 2022, the town had an estimated population of 3,734 in 1971 households and a population density of 66 persons per km^{2}. The total area of the town is 56.62 square kilometres (21.86 sq mi).

== Geography ==
Mugi is located along the southeastern coast of Tokushima Prefecture on the island of Shikoku. The Mugi River runs through the center of the town forming a basin suitable for agriculture. The town faces the Pacific Ocean along a series of cliffs to the east, and is subject to frequent typhoons. There are a number islands offshore, including Oshima, the largest uninhabited island in Tokushima Prefecture, and Teba Island, which is inhabited. Parts of the town are within the borders of the Muroto-Anan Kaigan Quasi-National Park.

=== Neighbouring municipalities ===
- Kaiyō
- Minami

=== Climate ===
Mugi has a humid subtropical climate (Köppen Cfa) characterized by warm summers and cool winters with light snowfall. The average annual temperature in Mugi is 16.2 °C. The average annual rainfall is 2330 mm with September as the wettest month. The temperatures are highest on average in August, at around 26.0 °C, and lowest in January, at around 6.6 °C.

== Demographics ==
Per Japanese census data, the population of Mugi has been declining rapidly since the 1960s, and is now roughly half of what it was a century ago.

Historical population
Year	Pop.	±%
1920	7,774	—
1930	8,102	+4.2%
1940	7,706	−4.9%
1950	10,521	+36.5%
1960	10,026	−4.7%
1970	8,181	−18.4%
1980	7,697	−5.9%
1990	6,798	−11.7%
2000	5,755	−15.3%
2010	4,826	−16.1%
2020	3,743	−22.4%

== History ==
As with all of Tokushima Prefecture, the area of Mugi was part of ancient Awa Province. It was noted for ocean-borne shipping, especially of timber, from Tosa Province to the Kinai region . During the Edo period, the area was part of the holdings of Tokushima Domain ruled by the Hachisuka clan from their seat at Tokushima Castle. In 1830, Australian convicts heading for Canton, China laid anchor off the coast of Mugi in a convict transport vessel, the brig Cyprus, which they had seized from their masters while being transported to Macquarie Harbour Penal Station in the former British penal colony of Van Diemen's Land, now Tasmania, an incident known as the Cyprus mutiny. The convicts were attacked and sent away by the Japanese, in line with the isolationist policy of the time. This may be the first incidence of an Australian aboriginal boomerang being gifted to Japanese people by Australian visitors. Other trading and a toast to the recently deceased wife of one of the crew was also held.

The village of Mugi was established within Kaifu District, Tokushima with the creation of the modern municipalities system on October 1, 1889. It was raised to town status on November 10, 1915. The 1946 Nankai earthquake caused great damage to the town, killing 53 people and completely destroying 374 homes.

== Government ==
Mugi has a mayor-council form of government with a directly elected mayor and a unicameral town council of eight members. Mugi, together with the other municipalities of Kaifu District, contributes two members to the Tokushima Prefectural Assembly. In terms of national politics, the town is part of Tokushima 1st district of the lower house of the Diet of Japan.

== Economy ==
Mugi has an economy based on agriculture and commercial fishing.

== Education ==
Mugi has one public elementary school and one public middle school operated by the town government. The town does not have a high school.

== Transportation ==
=== Railway ===
Shikoku Railway Company – Mugi Line

- Hegawa - Mugi

=== Highways ===
- National Route 55

== Sister cities ==
- Puyan, Changhua, Taiwan, sister city since 1983
