= Charles Grant (1810 EIC ship) =

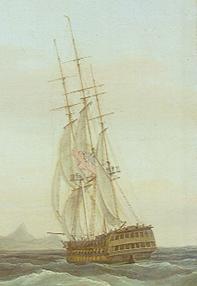
- Charles Grant

History

East India Company
- Name: Charles Grant
- Namesake: Charles Grant
- Owner: William Moffat
- Operator: East India Company (1810–1834)
- Builder: Bombay Dockyard, Jamsetjee Bomanjee Wadia, director
- Laid down: 15 October 1808
- Launched: 7 February 1810
- Fate: Sold 1834
- Notes: Three decks; teak-built

United Kingdom
- Name: Charles Grant
- Owner: Hyde & Lennox
- Acquired: 1834
- Fate: Broken up in 1838, or burnt at Bombay in 1847

General characteristics
- Tons burthen: 1246, or 1252, or 12522/94 or 1274, or 127416/94, or 1321 (bm)
- Length: 165 ft 6 in (50.4 m) (overall); 133 ft 8 in (40.7 m) (keel)
- Beam: 42 ft 4 in (12.9 m)
- Depth of hold: 17 ft 7 in (5.4 m)
- Complement: 130; 135
- Armament: 26 guns; 36 × 32&12-pounder guns

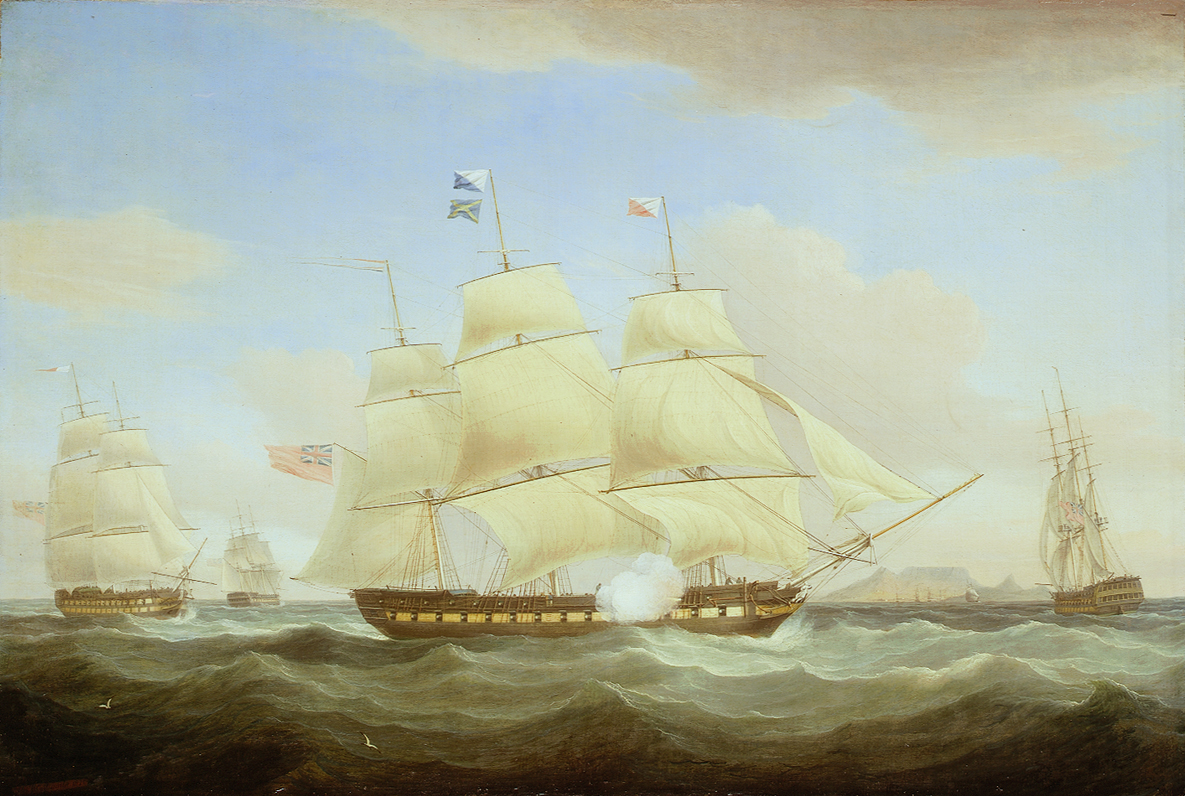
Indiamen Minerva, Scaleby Castle, and Charles Grant in 1820, by Thomas Whitcombe

Charles Grant was built at Bombay 1810. Between 1810 and 1833 she made 12 voyages as an East Indiaman for the British East India Company (EIC). Her owners sold her in 1834. She then sailed for new owners until 1838 when they had her broken up. Alternatively, she may have been sold to India and burnt there in 1847 at Bombay.

== Origin ==
Charles Grant was built on the bottom of Ganges, which had been laid down in June or October 1808 in Bombay. Prior to her launch in January 1810 she was renamed Charles Grant. She was built by the EIC itself for its own service and cost Rs 4,40,556 to build and outfit. Later the EIC sold Charles Grant to the owners of a vessel that had been lost for them to employ it under charter to the EIC.

== EIC voyages ==
Voyage #1: Captain Thomas Talbot Harington sailed Charles Grant on her maiden voyage. She left Bombay on 17 April 1810, reached St Helena on 5 July, and arrived at Long Reach on 8 September.

Voyage #2: Captain John Lock (or Loch), received a letter of marque on 27 February 1811. He would sail Charles Grant for three voyages.

She left Portsmouth on 8 April 1811, bound for China. She reached the Cape on 13 July, Penang on 30 August, and Malacca on 19 September, before arriving at Whampoa on 22 October. Homeward bound, she crossed the Second Bar (about 20 miles downstream from Whampoa), on 15 December, and reached St Helena on 21 March 1812. She arrived at Long Reach on 15 May.

Charles Grant was admitted to the Registry of Great Britain on 11 November 1812. Mr. Charles Neakes, draftsman and purveyor of the Thames shipbuilders Messrs Wigram and Green, testified to the House Select Committee on Petitions Relating to East-India-Built Shipping that repairs to her prior to her first and second voyages amounted to £1578 8s 11d and £1411 18s 7d; although he referred to her as a new ship, he did not specify the years of the work on so which voyages it actually pertained to.

Voyage #3: Lock sailed from Portsmouth on 24 December 1812, bound for Bombay and China. Charles Grant arrived at Bombay on 9 May 1813. She reached Penang on 18 July and arrived at Whampoa on 7 September. Homeward bound, she was at Lintin Island on 27 February 1814 and reached St Helena on 26 May. She arrived at Long Reach on 10 August.

Voyage #4: Lock left the Downs on 14 January 1815, bound for Bombay and China. Charles Grant reached the Cape on 31 March, Bombay on 27 May, Penang on 8 August, and Malacca on 22 August, before arriving at Whampoa on 23 September. Homeward bound, she crossed the Second Bar on 27 November, reached St Helena on 23 March 1816, and arrived at Long Reach on 15 May.

When Charles Grant arrived back at London she discharged her crew, including her Chinese sailors hired in Canton. Princess Amelia repatriated 18 to Canton, together with 362 others, leaving the Downs on 20 July 1816.

Voyage #5: For her next three voyages Charles Grant was under the command of Captain Hugh Scott. He sailed her from the Downs on 7 January 1817, bound for Bombay and China. She reached Bombay on 17 May, Penang on 27 July, and Malacca on 14 August, before arriving at Whampoa on 12 September. Homeward bound, she crossed the Second Bar on 21 November, reached St Helena on 24 March 1818, and arrived at Long Reach on 20 May.

Voyage #6: Scott sailed from the Downs on 28 January 1819, bound for Bombay and China. Charles Grant reached Bombay on 28 May, Penang on 25 July, and Singapore on 19 August, before arriving at Whampoa on 7 September. Homeward bound, she crossed the Second Bar on 22 November, reached the Cape on 1 February 1820 and St Helena on 23 February, and arrived at Blackwall on 4 May.

Voyage #7: Scott sailed from the Downs on 14 March 1821. Charles Grant reached Bombay on 10 June, Penang on 14 August, and Singapore on 4 September, arriving at Whampoa on 4 October. She crossed the Second Bar on 24 December and was at Cheunpi on 25 February 1822. She again crossed the Second Bar on 25 March, reached St Helena on 18 June, and arrived at Gravesend on 18 August.

On 13 November Moffat chartered Charles Grant to the EIC for three voyages at a rate of £20 12s per ton.

Voyage #8: Captain William Hay too sailed Charles Grant for three voyages. He left Portsmouth on 27 March 1823, bound for Mauritius and China. Charles Grant reached Mauritius on 12 June, Penang on 15 July, and Singapore on 7 August, arriving at Whampoa on 2 October. Homeward bound she crossed the Second Bar on 20 November, reached the Cape on 1 February 1824 and St Helena on 20 February, and arrived at Gravesend on 13 April.

Voyage #9: Hay sailed from the Downs on 16 April 1825, bound for Bengal and China. She reached Saugor on 4 August, Penang on 9 November, and Malacca on 22 November, before arriving at Whampoa on 16 January 1826. Homeward bound, she crossed the Second Bar on 22 February, reached Lintin on 4 March and St Helena on 4 August, and arrived at Blackwall on 1 October.

Voyage #10: Hay sailed from Portsmouth on 23 February 1827 bound for Bombay and China. Charles Grant reached Bombay on 12 June and arrived at Whampoa on 23 September. Homeward bound, she crossed the Second Bar on 6 November, reached the Cape on 30 January 1828 and St Helena on 17 February, and arrived at Gravesend on 12 April.

Moffat & Burnie chartered Charles Grant to the EIC on 16 July 1828 for one voyage as a "dismantled ship". She was rated as 311 tons (bm), and the charter rate was £16 12s 6d per ton.

Voyage #11: Captain Roger Barnston Everest left the Downs on 21 April 1829, bound for China. Charles Grant was in Anjer Roads on 25 July, Urmston's Bay on 14 August, and Cap Sing-Moon passage (by Kowloon) on 7 November, before arriving at Whampoa on 9 February 1830. Homeward bound, she crossed the Second Bar on 16 March, reached St Helena on 15 July, and arrived at Blackwall on 9 September.

Unbeknownst to Everest, four seamen that joined Charles Grant in Canton were mutineers from the brig Cyprus, one of whom had been a leader in the Cyprus mutiny. The four mutineers were arrested in England after their arrival and tried. Two were hanged and the other two were returned to Hobart.

On 21 September 1831 Moffat & Burnie again chartered Charles Grant to the EIC for one return voyage, this time at a rate of £12 10s.

Voyage #12: Captain John Rennie Manderson left the Downs on 11 March 1832, bound for Bengal and China. Charles Grant reached Saugor on 14 June and Malacca on 8 September, arriving at Whampoa on 12 October. Homeward bound, she crossed the Second Bar on 27 November, reached St Helena on 21 February 1833, and arrived at Long Reach on 14 April.

== Subsequent career and fate ==
Moffat sold Charles Grant on 15 February 1834 for £8,500 to Hyde & Lennox. Phipps later reported that a wealthy Parsee merchant had bought her for £13,000 for the China trade. Because Canton levied port duties on a per vessel basis rather than on a per ton basis, merchants favored larger vessels.

There is some ambiguity about her fate. By one account Charles Grant was broken up in 1838. Lloyd's Register carried her name for another year.

However, on 1 June 1847 Charles Grant was at Bombay with a cargo of cotton for China when she caught fire, cause unknown. The fire was subdued.
