= Badger escape =

Convict escape in 1833

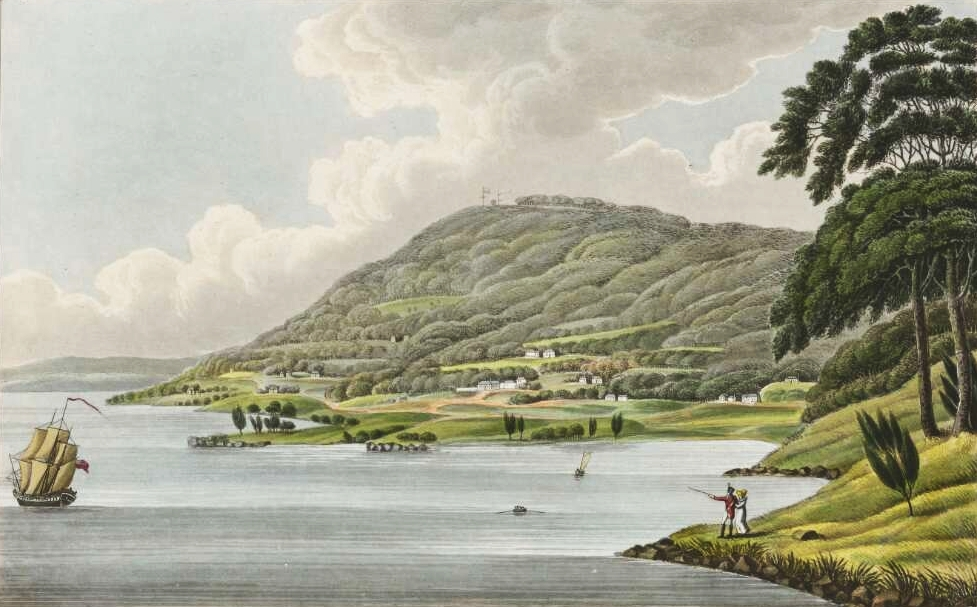
Convict artist Joseph Lycett's 1825 painting of Mount Nelson shows Darby's signal station.

The Badger escape occurred in July 1833 when twelve convicts in the British penal colony of Van Diemen's Land (modern-day Tasmania) used the government schooner Badger to escape to Macau, China. Most of the convicts involved were experienced seafarers who had been appointed to man the vessel soon after their transportation. For this, the colonial press accused the government of extreme negligence, and also called for the removal of lieutenant-governor George Arthur. In The History of Tasmania (1852), John West wrote that, of all the escapes from Van Diemen's Land, "never was the government more culpable, or the prisoners less so, than in the instance of the Badger".

== Background ==
The Badger escape plot likely originated with convict George Darby, a former Royal Navy lieutenant who served at the Battle of Navarino under Lord Cochrane. In 1830, he was convicted of stealing from the York House Hotel in Bath and sentenced to transportation for life to Van Diemen's Land. While in confinement at Plymouth, he met master mariner William Philp, due to be transported for life for blowing up a sloop with gunpowder in Penzance harbour. The pair, believing they were to be sent on the same ship, laid a plot to seize it, but were found out. Philp subsequently ended up on the Argyle while Darby was transported on the William Glen Anderson. The surgeon superintendent of Darby's ship received a warning that he was a "dangerous man" who would, "in all probability, be the means of inducing a mutiny ... unless vigilantly watched". Indeed, Darby plotted a mutiny during the voyage with the intention of running for the American coast, where he claimed he had considerable treasure. Another convict on board, the notorious Ikey Solomon, thwarted Darby's plot by alerting the surgeon superintendent, who, upon arrival in Hobart in November 1831, told lieutenant-governor George Arthur. In consequence, Arthur warned Darby that he would "suffer all the law could inflict" if he tried to escape.

Meanwhile, several convicts on the Argyle had been found guilty of attempting to murder its commander, Captain Stavers, in order to "piratically take away the ship". Although the ship's surgeon superintendent testified that Philp seemed to be in on the conspiracy, he did not receive punishment.

== Escape from Hobart ==
Despite Darby's mutinous conduct, as well as repeated warnings about his character, he was appointed as signal man at Mount Nelson, and subsequently made an assistant to the water bailiff, which allowed him to select the crews for various government vessels. Such a position also afforded him an opportunity of knowing the respective qualifications of Hobart's crewmen, a significant minority of whom were convicts. By July 1833, one of the government's schooners, the 25-tonne Badger, had been manned entirely with convicts, including Philp. A "fast sailer" and "well fitted out for a long voyage", the Badger was used to ship provisions from Hobart to military outposts and penal stations around Van Diemen's Land, notably Port Arthur. In early July 1833, she was freighted with provisions, muskets, ammunition and nautical instruments, and set sail for East Bay Neck military station. Darby signaled that the schooner had arrived, but she never put in. Days later, Darby, the Badger and her crew were reported missing. All twelve convicts on board were "used to the seafaring life" with the exception of John Roberts, a clergyman who had recently been transported to the colony.

=== Aftermath ===
When word leaked that the missing Badger had been left solely in charge of convicts, there were immediate calls in the press for the removal of lieutenant-governor Arthur, and that he be "surcharged to the amount of the value of the Badger, and for the stores she had on board".

The authorities supposed that the Badger had set out for New Zealand, by then notorious for its population of runaway convicts. A number of ships were dispatched to the Tasman Sea to hunt down either the Badger or the Frederick—another Vandemonian ship stolen by convict pirates—or what the Colonial Times called "needles in a stack of hay". Their searches proved fruitless. While The Austral-Asiatic Review declared that the "miserable men ... will assuredly all perish" at sea, The Independent surmised that, owing to their characters and nautical experience, they would make for South America.

The Badger escape, like the futile Black Line, remained a point of reference for critics of lieutenant-governor Arthur. In a sarcastic response to a speech in which he said he had introduced "a more efficient Prison Discipline" in Van Diemen's Land, one journalist cited the circumstances of the Badger as "indisputable proof" of his claim. Critics also reported "without astonishment" that one of the vessels sent in pursuit of the Badger, the cutter Charlotte, had a crew mostly comprising convicts.

== Discovery in Macau ==
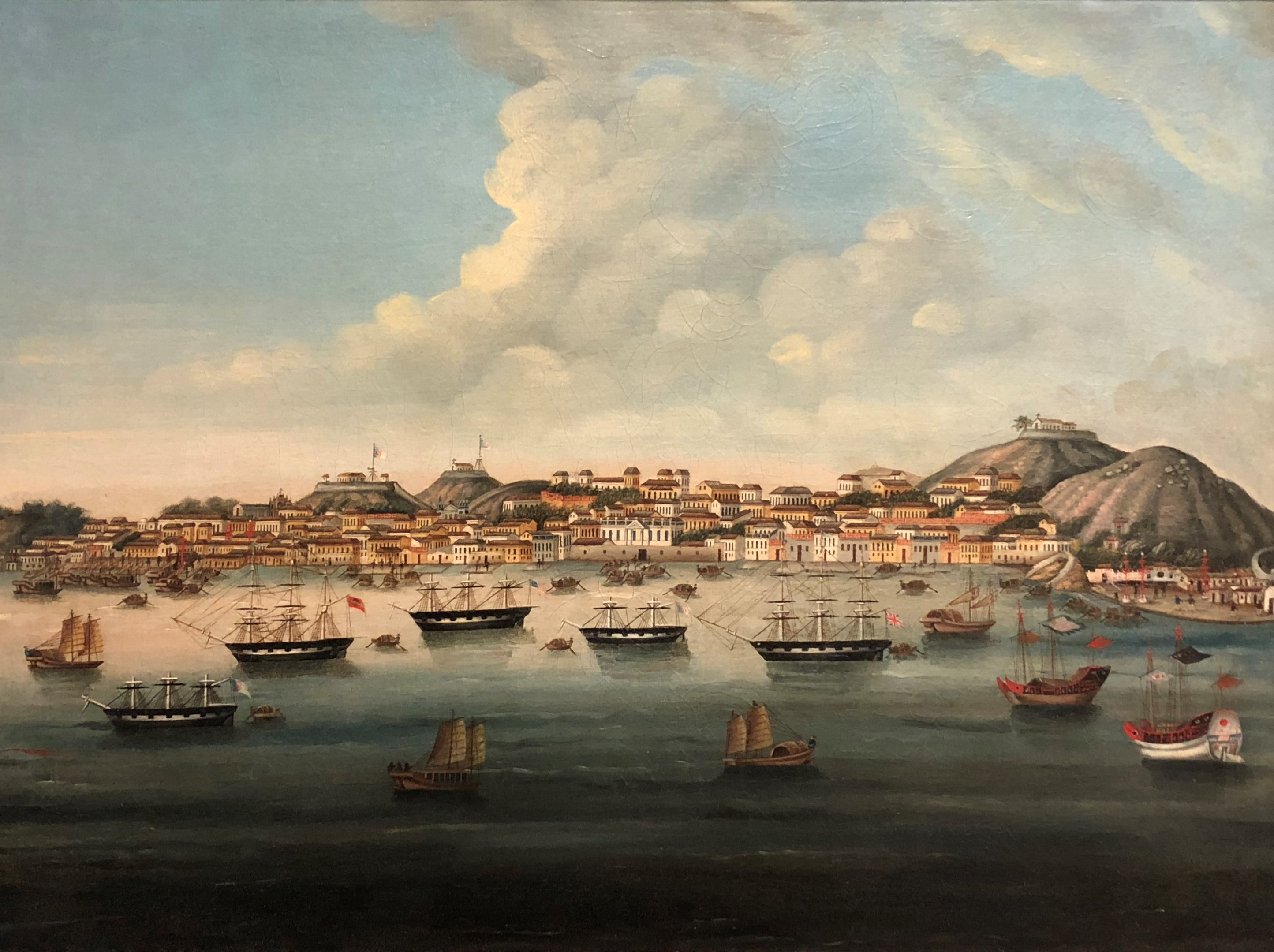
Macau, early 19th-century

The fate of the Badger remained a mystery in Australia until Captain Rees, of the merchant vessel Lord Amherst, reported in August 1834 that the convicts had been found alive in Macau, China. When Rees was there, he met a party of self-described "shipwrecked seaman" who had initially reached Manila before being brought up to Macau by a Spanish vessel. Later on, the commander of the convict transport Argyle, Captain Stavers, arrived at Macau on his ship the Mermaid. He recognised Philp "as a runaway convict from Van Diemen’s Land, having brought him out from England"; at least two others "were also identified by other persons as being runaways from the same place". An investigation confirmed that the "seamen" matched descriptions of the twelve absconders in a copy of The Sydney Herald found at Macau, and the vessel which had wrecked at Manila "[corresponded] in every respect with that of the Badger". Nonetheless, the Portuguese authorities refused to interfere, saying there was "not sufficient proof", and the men having been well-behaved in Macau, they could not imprison them.

Rees reported that four of the men subsequently escaped to America aboard a vessel, while Philp and the other seven "remained unmolested" at Macau. Before leaving for Sydney, Rees offered Philp a passage there, but he politely refused, saying "he did not wish to go so far southward".

== See also ==
- Cyprus mutiny
- Frederick escape
