= Caroline (1800 Philadelphia ship) =

History

United States
- Builder: Philadelphia
- Launched: 1800
- Captured: 1813

United Kingdom
- Name: Caroline
- Acquired: 1813 by purchase of a prize
- Fate: Wrecked 17 March 1825

General characteristics
- Tons burthen: 224, (bm)
- Armament: 2 × 12-pounder guns

Caroline was launched at Philadelphia in 1800. She was taken in prize. New owners retained her name and she appeared in British records from 1813. From 1820 on she was based at Hobart in Van Diemen's Land. From there she sailed to and from Port Jackson and on seal hunting voyages to Macquarie Island. She departed on a sealing voyage in November 1824 and wrecked at Macquarie Island on 17 March 1825; her crew were rescued some five months later.

== Career ==
Caroline first appeared in Lloyd's Register (LR) in 1813.

Year	Master	Owner	Trade	Source & notes
1813	A.Gourlie	F.Beckett	London–Quebec	LR
1814	A.Gourlic; H.Allen	F.Becket	London–Quebec	LR

Lloyd's List (LL) reported on 26 August 1814 that Caroline, Allen, master, had been returning to London from Demerary when she grounded on the Bembridge Ridge. It was expected that she would be gotten off. On 25 August she was gotten off after some of her cargo had been removed. She was taken into Portsmouth.

Year	Master	Owner	Trade	Source & notes
1815	H.Allen; Lilburne	F.Becket	London–Demerara	LR
1816	J.Lilurne; C.Davy	F.Becket	London–Demerara	LR

On 6 March 1818 Caroline, Serjeant, master, sailed from Demerara but grounded on one of the banks. She had to put back and it was expected that she would be detained until spring.

Year	Master	Owner	Trade	Source & notes
1819	J.Sargent	Douglas & Co.	London–Demerara	LR
1820	J.Sargent; D.Taylor	Douglas & Co.	London–Demerara; London–New South Wales	LR
1821	D.Taylor	F.Lord	Plymouth–New South Wales	LR

On 3 August 1820, Caroline, Taylor, master, arrived at Plymouth from London. She sailed on 8 August, bound for New South Wales. She arrived there, and then on 3 January 1821 Caroline, Taylor, master, sailed from Port Jackson for the Derwent River. On 30 May she was back at New South Wales from Hobart Town.

On 15 November Caroline sailed for the South Shetland Islands; she arrived there on 19 December 1821. On 3 February 1822 Caroline, Taylor, master, from Port Jackson, was reported to be there with 500 seal skins. However, by 25 February she was at Valparaiso, having come from the Juan Fernández Islands. On 15 February 1823 Caroline returned from her 16-month long sealing and whaling voyage. She was last from Macquarie Island.

On 17 April she sailed for Macquarie Island to hunt elephant oil and skins. My mid-July she was back at Hobart Town. On 2 October she again sailed for Macquarie Island. On 1 January 1824 she returned with a full cargo of oil. On 30 January she arrived at Sydney from Macquarie Island with a full cargo of sea-elephant oil.

On 4 March Caroline sailed for the sperm whale fishery. On 22 April she returned from Macquarie Island with 90 tons of elephant oil. On 4 July Caroline sailed for Hobart and Île de France. By 28 August she was in the River Derwent. On 1 September she arrived at Sydney with 3150 bushels of wheat from Launceston, Tasmania.

== Fate ==
Caroline departed from Port Jackson on 17 November 1824, bound for Macquarie Island.

Caroline, Taylor, master, was totally lost in March 1825, together with her cargo, on the west coast of Macquarie Island. A gale had driven her ashore. Some 90 tons of her cargo of 130 tons of elephant seal oil were lost, but all aboard survived. Some five months later Wellington brought Taylor and his crew back to Sydney. About a month later Cyprus brought Caroline's surviving whale oil from Macquarie Island back to Tasmania. The wreck was sold on 8 October 1825.

== Lloyd's Register ==
Between 1823 and 1826 LR apparently carried duplicate entries for Caroline. These entries had some inconsistencies with each other and with the Register of Shipping (RS) concerning Caroline's burthen, and place and year of origin.

Year	Master	Owner	Trade	Source and notes
1823	D.Taylor	F.Lord	Plymouth–New South Wales	LR; 224 tons (bm), Philadelphia (1800); good repair 1820
1823	Taylor	Lord	London–Van Diemen's Land	LR; 244 tons (bm), Baltimore (1806); thorough repair 1820
1823	Taylor	Lord	London–New South Wales	RS; 224 tons (bm), America (1803), damages repaired 1815
