= Cyprus (1816 ship) =

UK merchant ship 1816–1829

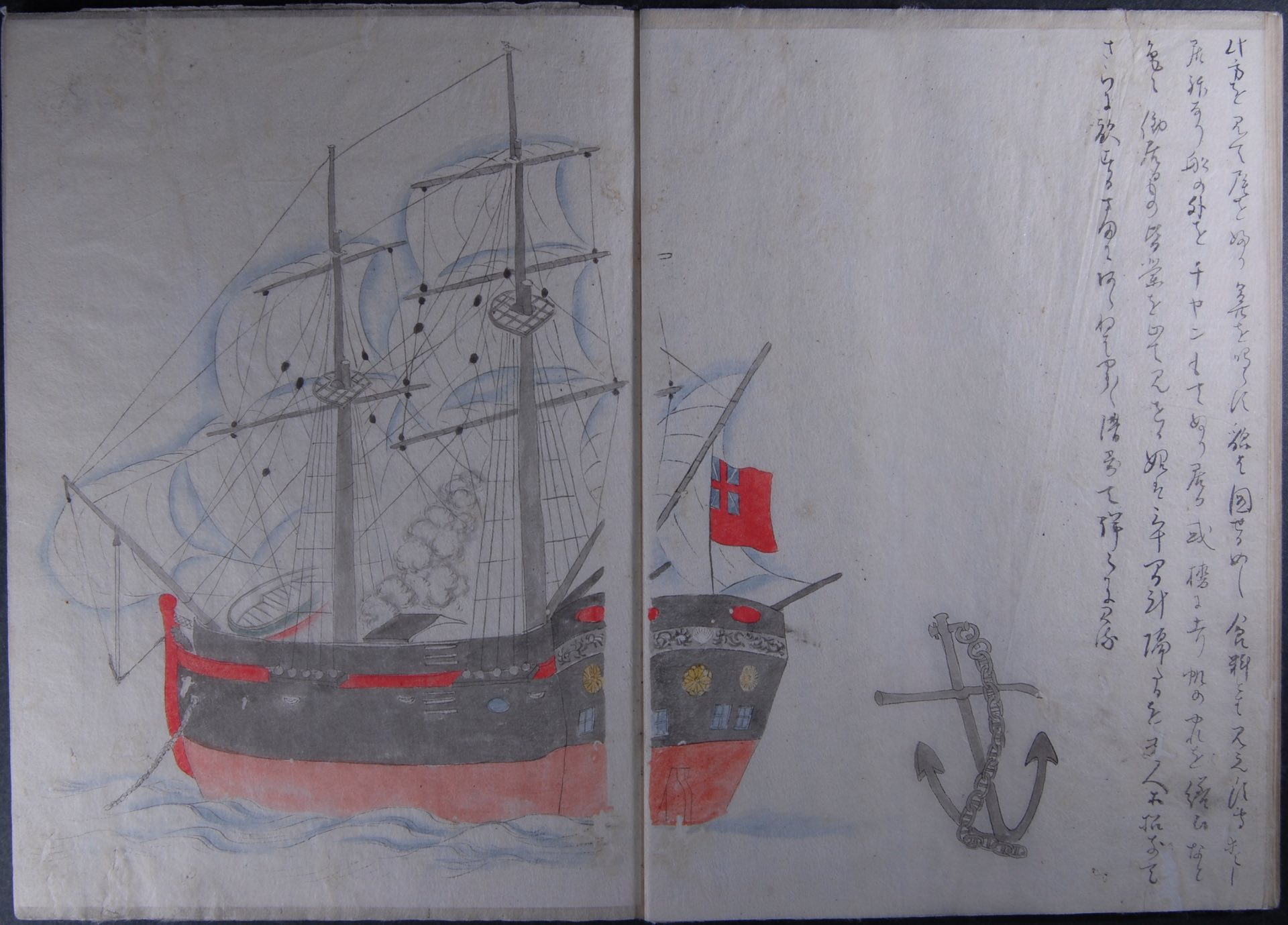
- Japanese watercolour from 1830 depicting a British-flagged ship believed to be the brig Cyprus

History

United Kingdom
- Name: Cyprus
- Namesake: Cyprus
- Builder: Sunderland
- Launched: 1816
- Fate: Scuttled 1830

General characteristics
- Type: Brig
- Tons burthen: 100, or 109 (bm)
- Length: 70 ft 6 in (21.5 m) (overall)
- Beam: 20 ft 0 in (6.1 m)
- Propulsion: Sail
- Complement: 13
- Notes: Two masts. One-and-a-half decks.

Cyprus was a brig launched at Sunderland in 1816. The colonial government in Van Diemen's Land purchased her in 1826. In 1829 as she was transporting convicts from Hobart Town to Macquarie Harbour Penal Station, some of the convicts seized Cyprus. They sailed her via Japan to Canton, where they scuttled her.

== Career ==
Cyprus first appears in the registers in 1818 with Davidson, master. The registers disagree over her owner and trade. Lloyds Register (LR) gives the name of her owner as R. Rapler, and her trade as London—St Petersburg. The Register of Shipping (RS) gives her owner as Lamplater, and her trade as London—Stettin.

The Register of Shipping for 1824 shows Cyprus's master changing from Brown to Rand, and her owner from Proud to Briggs. Her trade changed from Liverpool—Riga to London—Madeira.

Captain John Briggs brought Cyprus to Van Diemen's Land in 1825 and set himself up there as a general mercantile agent. He employed Cyprus on runs between Hobart Town and Sydney.

In late 1825 she brought whale oil from Macquarie Island back to Tasmania. The whale oil belonged to Caroline, which had wrecked there in March. (The crew of Caroline had been rescued by Wellington in August.)

She then sailed to Île de France (Mauritius) under a license from the British East India Company. In July 1826 Lloyds List reported that on 15 March Cyprus, Todd, master, which had left Mauritius on 10 March, bound for Hobart, had returned to Mauritius due to problems with leaks.

On her return to Hobart Town, Briggs sold Cyprus to the government there for £1700. The government needed a replacement for its existing brig, Duke of York, which had become unseaworthy. (Note: The government then hulked Duke of York. She served first as a powder magazine and then as a prison hulk.)

Lieutenant Governor George Arthur used Cyprus to carry convicts, troops, stores, and provisions to the penal colony at Macquarie Harbour. She brought back Huon pine, and various goods that the convicts there had manufactured.

In August 1828 Cyprus set out for Macquarie Harbour. She had on board 31 or 33 convicts; Lieutenant Carew and 10 men of the 63rd Regiment of Foot provided the guard. The crew consisted of a master and 14 others. Cyprus also carried Carew's wife and three other women and their two children, who were returning to Macquarie Harbour.

== Mutiny ==
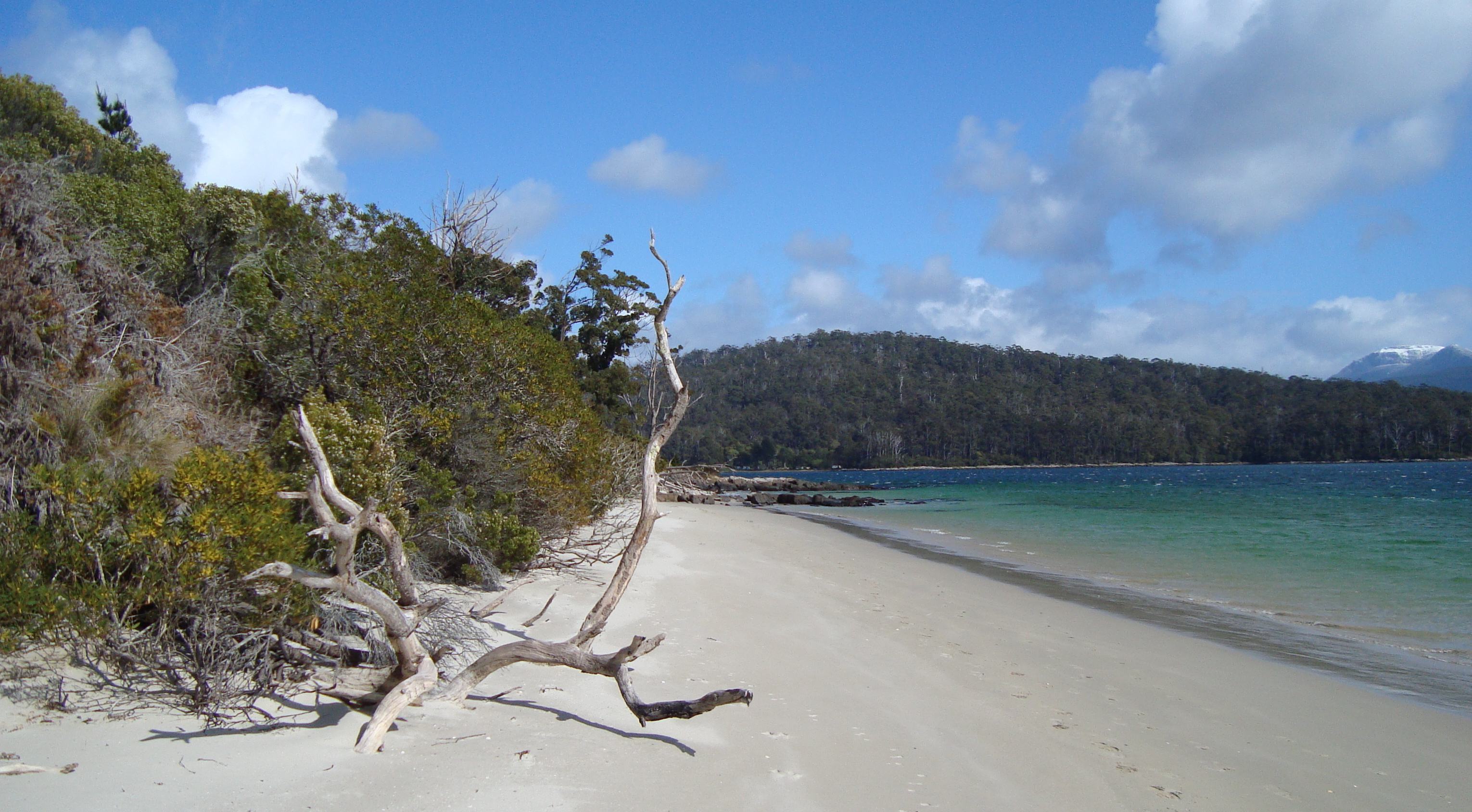
Recherche Bay, Tasmania, where the convicts took control of the brig

On 5 September Cyprus was anchored in Recherche Bay, having taken shelter there. Lieutenant Carew and four others went fishing and while they were away some convicts took over the brig. They eventually marooned there all the non-convicts, as well as a number of convicts that chose not to join the mutiny.

Nineteen convicts sailed away in Cyprus, having appointed one of their number, William Swallow, the only one with sailing experience, as sailing master. The mutineers first sailed to New Zealand, and then on to the Chatham Islands. There they plundered the schooner Samuel of the seal skins her crew had gathered. From the Islands, Cyprus sailed for Tahiti, but then changed destination to Tonga. The mutineers landed at Keppel's Island, where Ferguson, the leader, and six others decided to remain. Swallow then sailed to Japan, landing near Shikoku, where it was damaged by cannon fire. (Note: Swallow's account of Cyprus's visit was questioned, and even rejected for lack of corroborating evidence. However in 2017 this account was compared with Japanese records of an unwelcome visit by a British vessel off the town of Mugi, Tokushima on Shikoku island in 1830, and the accounts matched in many points.)

From Japan Cyprus sailed to the Ladrones. There, four more of the mutineers left the ship. Swallow sailed on to Canton. Eventually, the mutineers scuttled Cyprus near Canton and claimed that they were castaways from another vessel. Swallow and three others worked their passage back to Britain aboard the East Indiaman Charles Grant. However, a man the mutineers had left in Canton confessed and by chance his account reached Britain a week before Swallow and his last three companions arrived there. The mutineers were tried and two were hanged. Swallow, and two others, were returned to Hobart, where one was hanged. Swallow died at Port Arthur.
