= Fish paste =

Paste made of fish meat

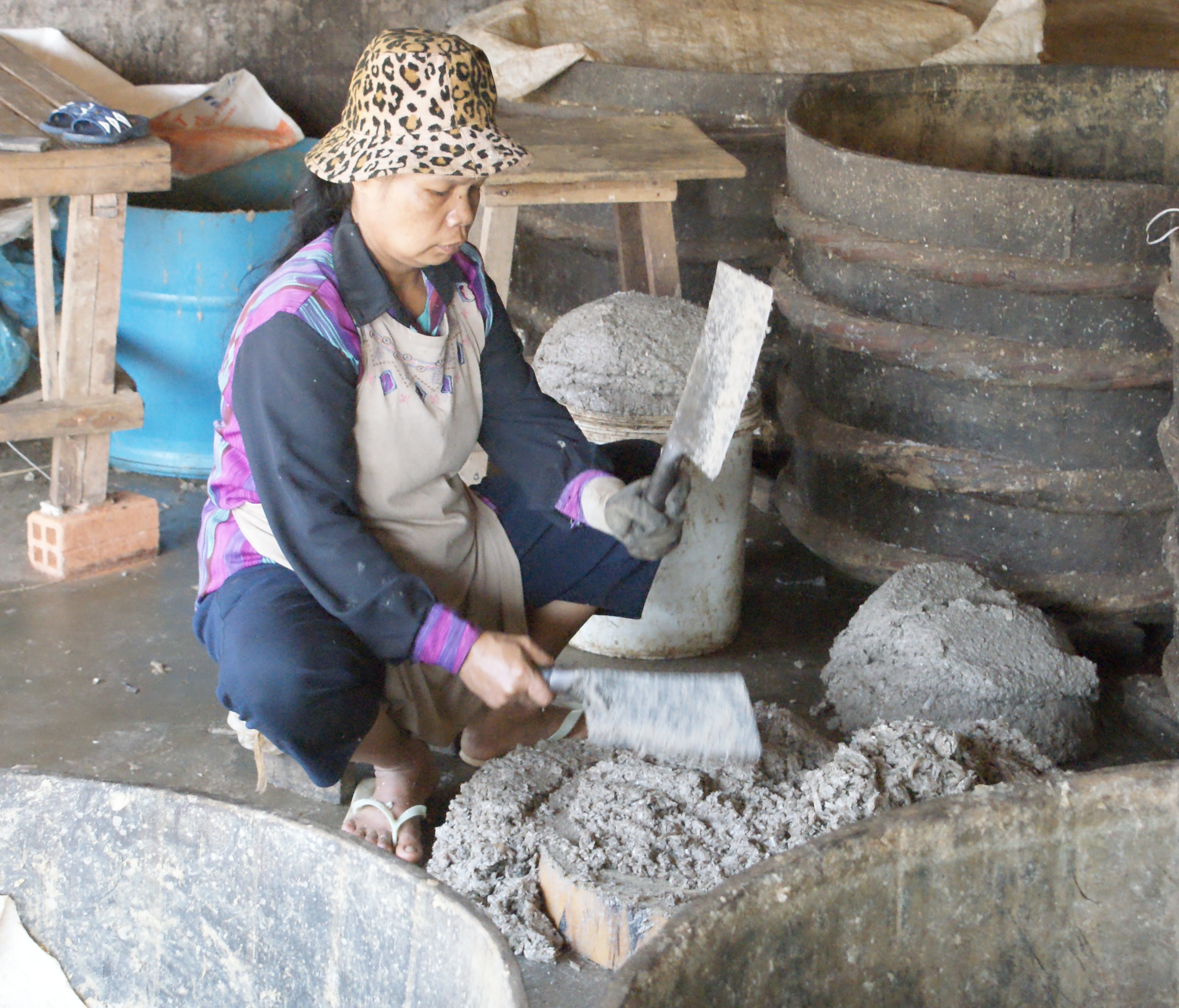
Making fish paste in Cambodia

Fish paste is fish which has been chemically broken down by a fermentation process until it reaches the consistency of a soft creamy purée or paste. Alternatively, it refers to cooked fish that has been physically broken down by pounding, grinding, pressing, mincing, blending, and/or sieving until it reaches paste consistency. The term can be applied also to shellfish pastes, such as shrimp paste or crab paste.

Fish paste is used as a condiment or seasoning to add flavour to food, or in some cases to complement a dish. Generally, fish paste is reduced to a thick, rich concentrate, which has usually been cooked for a long time. It can be contrasted with fish sauce, which is like a fish paste except it is not cooked for so long, is a thick liquid rather than a concentrated paste, and may include seasonings and other flavorings.

== History ==
"Preservation of marine products is of great importance to the coastal poor. Preserved fish products ensure adequate protein during low fishing periods. Subsistence fishers use their abundant catch of small fish to make fermented fish paste and smoked fish with the assistance of family members."

== Traditional pastes ==
Process	Name	Image	Origin	Description
Fermented	Aligue		Philippines	A fermented paste derived from the salted roe and aligue (reddish or orange crab "fat") of river swimming crabs or Asian shore crabs (talangka) sautéed in garlic and preserved in oil. It is traditionally sold in bottles and can be eaten over white rice, used as a condiment, or used as an ingredient in various seafood dishes.
Fermented	Bagoong		Philippines	A class of condiments in the Philippines made from salted and fermented fish, krill, shrimp, or other seafood. The excess liquids made from the process is also used to make a fish sauce called patís. Also known by other names depending on the ingredients used.
Fermented	Mắm		Vietnam	Mắm is fermented with salt similar to fish sauce, except that it is not fermented as long, and both the meat and extract are obtained. There are two varieties of Mắm, one where the flesh is still relatively kept together, and one that is similar to pastes. Mắm can be used as a base condiment in dipping sauces with additional ingredients, used in soups, stir-fries and meat loaves, or eaten with rice as a main dish.
Fermented	Balao-balao		Philippines	A Filipino dish consisting of cooked rice and whole raw shrimp fermented with salt and angkak (red yeast rice). Depending on the salt content, it is fermented for several days to weeks. It can be eaten as is with rice or used as a dipping sauce for grilled or fried dishes.
Fermented	Garum		Ancient Greece; Ancient Rome; Byzantium	A pungent paste made by crushing the roe and liver of various fishes such as mackerel, tuna, and eel, and then fermenting in brine. It reached its greatest popularity in the Roman world, where it was both a staple to the common diet and a luxury for the wealthy. After the liquid garum was ladled off of the top of the mixture, the remains of the fish, called allec, was used by the poorest classes to flavour their staple porridge. Among the rich, the best garum fetched extraordinarily high prices.
Fermented	Ngachin		Burma	Ngachin, lit. 'sour fish', is a fish paste product consisting of raw freshwater fish, which is pressed with a mixture of cooked rice gruel and salt as it ferments, and is traditionally packed in taungzun leaves
Fermented	Ngapi		Burma	Ngapi, lit. 'compressed fish', is a generic term for pungent pastes made of either fish or shrimp. It is usually made from the fermentation of salted ground fish or shrimp, which is then sun dried. Ngapi is a main ingredient of Lower Burmese cooking, used as a condiment and additive in most dishes. Raw ngapi is not intended for direct consumption.
Fermented	Padaek		Laos	Made from pickled or fermented fish that has been cured. Often known as Laotian fish sauce, it is a thicker, seasoned fish sauce that often contains chunks of fish in it. The fermentation takes a long time, giving padaek a rich aroma similar to fine cheeses like Époisses. Unlike other versions of fish sauce in Southeast Asia, padaek is made from freshwater fish, owing to the landlocked nature of the region where it originated.
Fermented	Petis ikan		Indonesia	Salty dark fish paste.
Fermented	Prahok		Cambodia	Usually made of crushed, salted and fermented mud fish, prahok originated as a way of preserving fish during the longer months when fresh fish was not available in abundant supply. Because of its saltiness and strong flavor, it was used as an addition to many meals, such as soups. Prahok has a strong and distinct smell, earning the nickname Cambodian Cheese. Prahok is usually eaten with rice in the countryside or poorer regions.
Fermented	Shrimp paste		Southeast Asia	Made from fermented ground shrimp, sun dried and either cut into fist-sized rectangular blocks or sold in bulk. An essential ingredient in many curries and sauces. Shrimp paste can be found in many meals in Southeast Asia, often as an ingredient in dip for fish or vegetables.
Physically processed	Anchovette		England	The main ingredient includes a fish mixture of pilchards, mackerel, and anchovies in various proportions, the rest being water, salt, etc. It contains between 82 and 90 percent fish, and is eaten on warm toast, in snacks, and on sandwiches. Anchovette is one of range of products sold internationally, by companies independently operating under the Peck's brand. Countries of operation include the UK, South Africa, and Australia.
Physically processed	Gentleman's Relish		England	Gentleman's Relish, a type of anchovy paste also known as Patum Peperium, was created in 1828 by an Englishman called John Osborn. It contains anchovies (minimum 60%), butter, herbs and spices. Today, the secret recipe is withheld from all but one employee by the licensed manufacturer, Elsenham Quality Foods. Traditionally eaten thinly spread on slices of buttered white-bread toast, either on its own, or with cucumber, or "Mustard and cress" sprouts. Shipham's Salmon Paste is another long-established British fish paste, and other varieties are common, including anchovy, shrimp, and bloater (based on small smoked herrings). British fish pastes are commonly used as a spread inside white-bread sandwiches, eaten for lunch or as part of afternoon tea, a light meal consumed around 3 p.m. or 4 p.m. and consisting of a variety of quartered sandwiches, small cakes, and scones, served with hot Chinese or Indian tea. Similar fish pastes, including Anchovette, and Salmon and Lobster, are still available in Australian supermarkets, and were a staple for children's school lunches, sandwiches brought from home, during the 1950s and 1960s. In Australia, similar meat-based concoctions, in chicken and ham, and devilled (pepper-spiced ham), are still made by Peck's, which began manufacturing in 1904.
Physically processed	Jakoten		Japan	Made from small white fish caught nearby that are ground and blended into a paste with seasoning and then fried. The heads, viscera and scales of the fish are removed. Then, the remaining parts are minced including the bones. Seasoning is added and the minced fish is ground into a paste. Next, it is shaped into rectangular patties by using a wood frame. The patties are fried several minutes until they become brownish color. Has been used in Japan since the Edo period.
Physically processed	Kamaboko		Japan	Made from pureed white fish, combined with additives such as MSG, formed into distinctive loaves and then steamed until fully cooked and firm. The steamed loaves are sliced and served unheated with various dipping sauces or sliced and included in hot soups, one-dish meals, or noodle dishes. Typically sold in semicylindrical loaves. Some kamaboko include artistic patterns. Red-skinned and white kamaboko are typically served at celebratory and holiday meals, as red and white are considered to bring good luck. Has been made since the 14th century.
Physically processed	Pissalat		France	The name comes from peis salat in Niçard, meaning "salted fish". It is made from anchovy puree flavoured with cloves, thyme, bay leaf and black pepper mixed with olive oil. Used for flavouring hors d'oeuvres, fish, cold meats and the local specialty pissaladière.
Physically processed	Poacher's Relish		England	A tangy relish made with smoked salmon and lemon zest. Made by the same manufacturer that makes Gentlemen's Relish, it is usually eaten with toast, crackers or blinis.
Physically processed	Pudpod		Philippines	A flat patty made from pounded fish which is then smoked. Usually made with anchovies, but can also be made with larger fish like tuna or shark.
Physically processed	Surimi		Japan; China; East Asia	Literally ground meat. Typically made from white fish, such as pollock or hake, that is pulverized to a thick paste and cooked until it becomes dense and firm. The term can also be applied to similar food products made from meat, like chicken and pork. Surimi is widely used in Asian cultures and is available in many shapes, forms, and textures. Surimi is a popular ingredient in hotpot, soups, stir-fries, and even deep-fried and eaten as a snack. It is often further processed to mimic the texture and color of the meat of lobster, crab and other shellfish. The most common surimi product in the Western market is imitation crab meat, however fish balls and fish cakes made from surimi are also common in conventional and Asian supermarkets in major cities. The process for making surimi was developed in many areas of East Asia over several centuries though the exact history and origins of this product is unclear. In China the food was used to make fish balls and as ingredients in a thick soup called Geng. In Japan it is used to make kamaboko, fish sausage, or cured surimi products. Currently, 2–3 million tonnes of fish, amounting to 2–3 percent of the world fisheries supply, are used for the production of surimi and surimi-based products, often unsorted bycatch.

== See also ==
- Anchovy paste – Food product
- Fish sauce – Condiment made from fish
- List of fish sauces
- List of condiments
- List of sauces
