= Kamaboko =

Japanese cured fish product

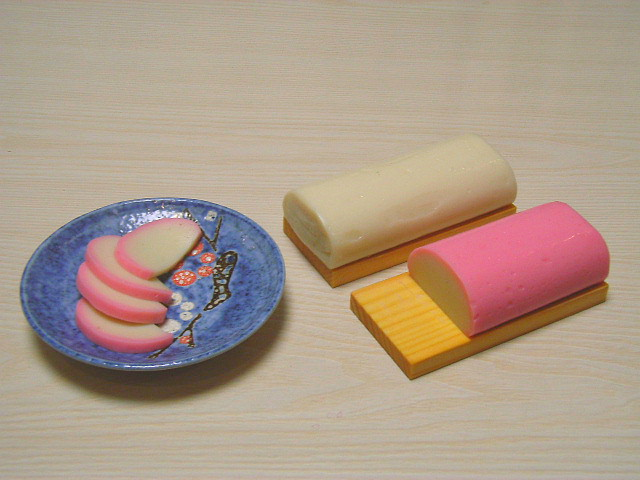
- Pink and white kamaboko
- Alternative names: Fish cake
- Type: Surimi
- Place of origin: Japan
- Region or state: East Asia
- Main ingredients: White fish
- Similar dishes: Gefilte fish

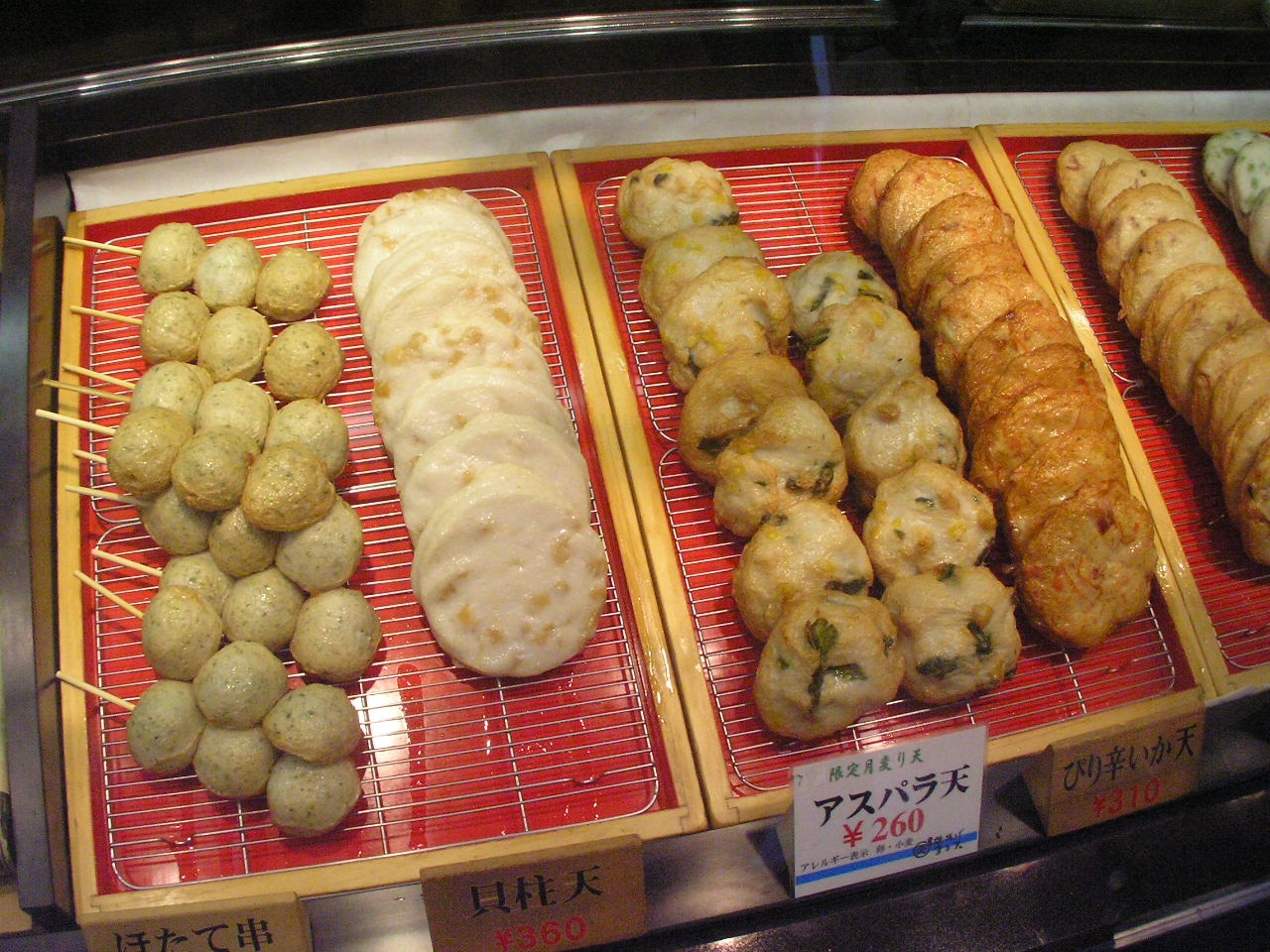
Satsuma age

Kamaboko (蒲鉾; Japanese pronunciation: [kä̀.mä́.bó̞.kó̞]) is a type of cured surimi, a processed seafood product common in Japanese cuisine. It was initially made in the year 1115.

== Production and uses ==
Kamaboko is made by forming various pureed deboned white fish with either natural or man-made additives and flavorings into distinctive loaves, which are then steamed until fully cooked and firm. These are sliced and either served unheated (or chilled) with various dipping sauces, or added to various hot soups, rice, or noodle dishes. Kamaboko is often sold in semicylindrical loaves, some featuring artistic patterns, such as the pink spiral on each slice of narutomaki, named after the well-known tidal whirlpool near the Japanese city of Naruto.

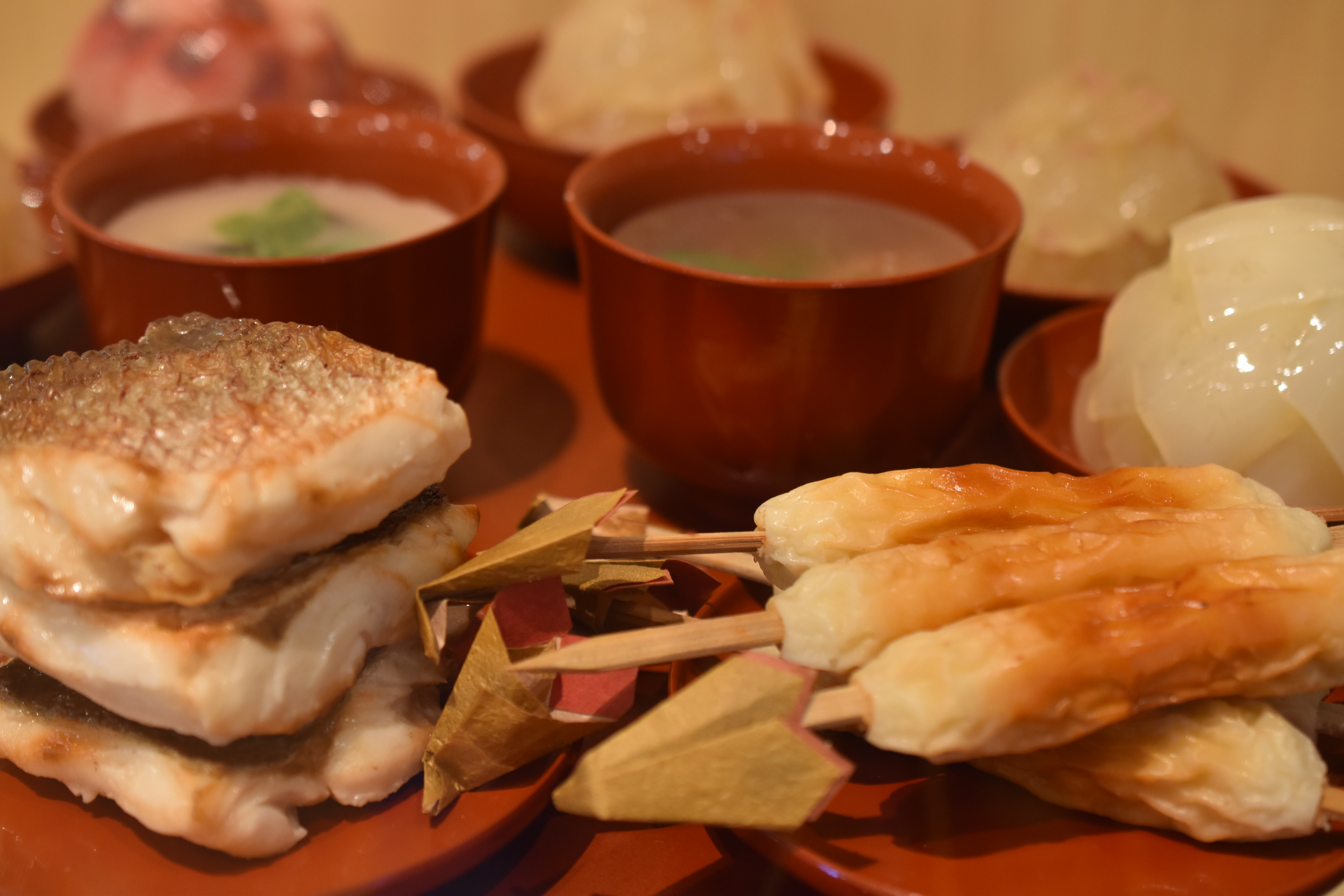
A model of a 12th-century meal including the earliest known example of kamaboko.

There is no precise English translation for kamaboko. Rough equivalents are fish paste, fish loaf, fish cake, and fish sausage. Shizuo Tsuji, chef and author, recommends using the Japanese name in English, similar to English usage of the word sushi. Kamaboko has been made in Japan since the 12th century and is now available nearly worldwide. The simulated crab meat product kanikama (short for kani-kamaboko) is the best-known form of surimi in the West.

Red-skinned and white kamaboko are typically served at celebratory and holiday meals, as red and white are considered to bring good luck. In Japan, the prepackaged snack chiikama (cheese plus kamaboko) is commonly sold in convenience stores. In the city of Uwajima, a type of fried kamaboko called jakoten is popular. In Miyagi Prefecture, sasa-kamaboko (笹かまぼこ) is a regional kamaboko variation, pale white in colour, formed in the shape of bamboo leaves and often lightly grilled immediately prior to serving.

== Composition ==
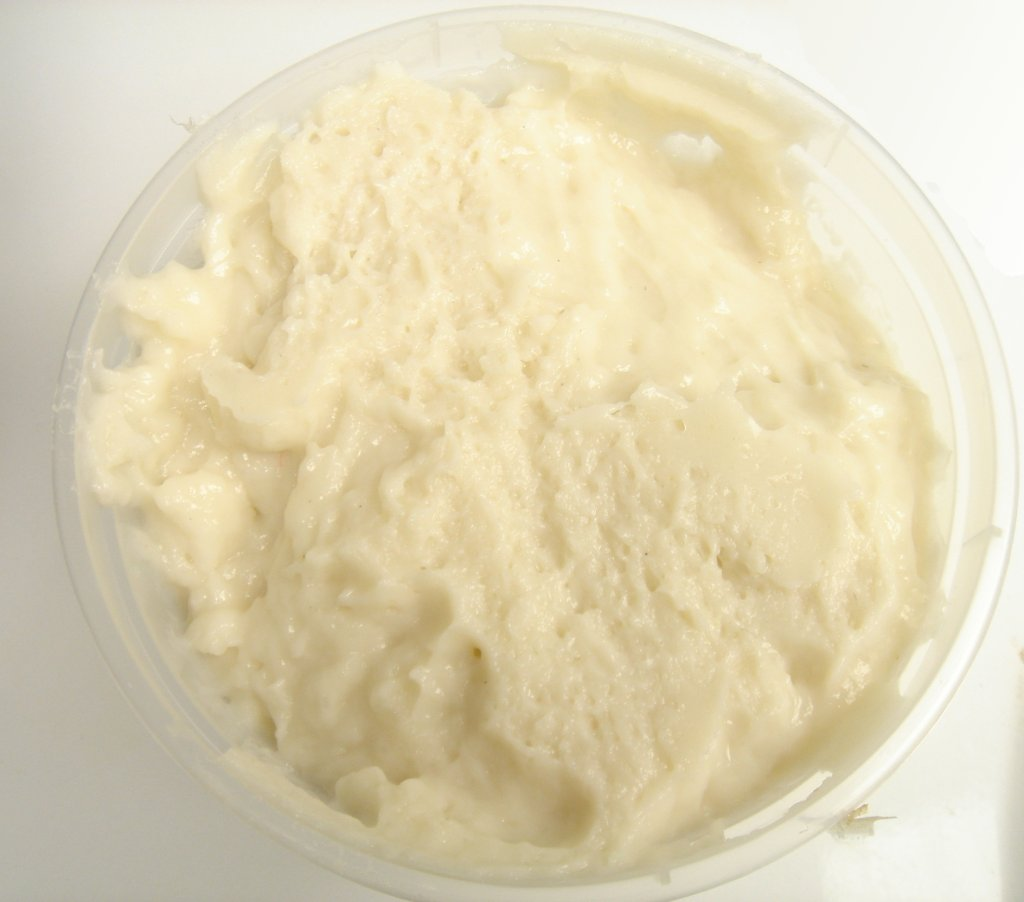
A tub of uncured fish surimi ready for finish-processing

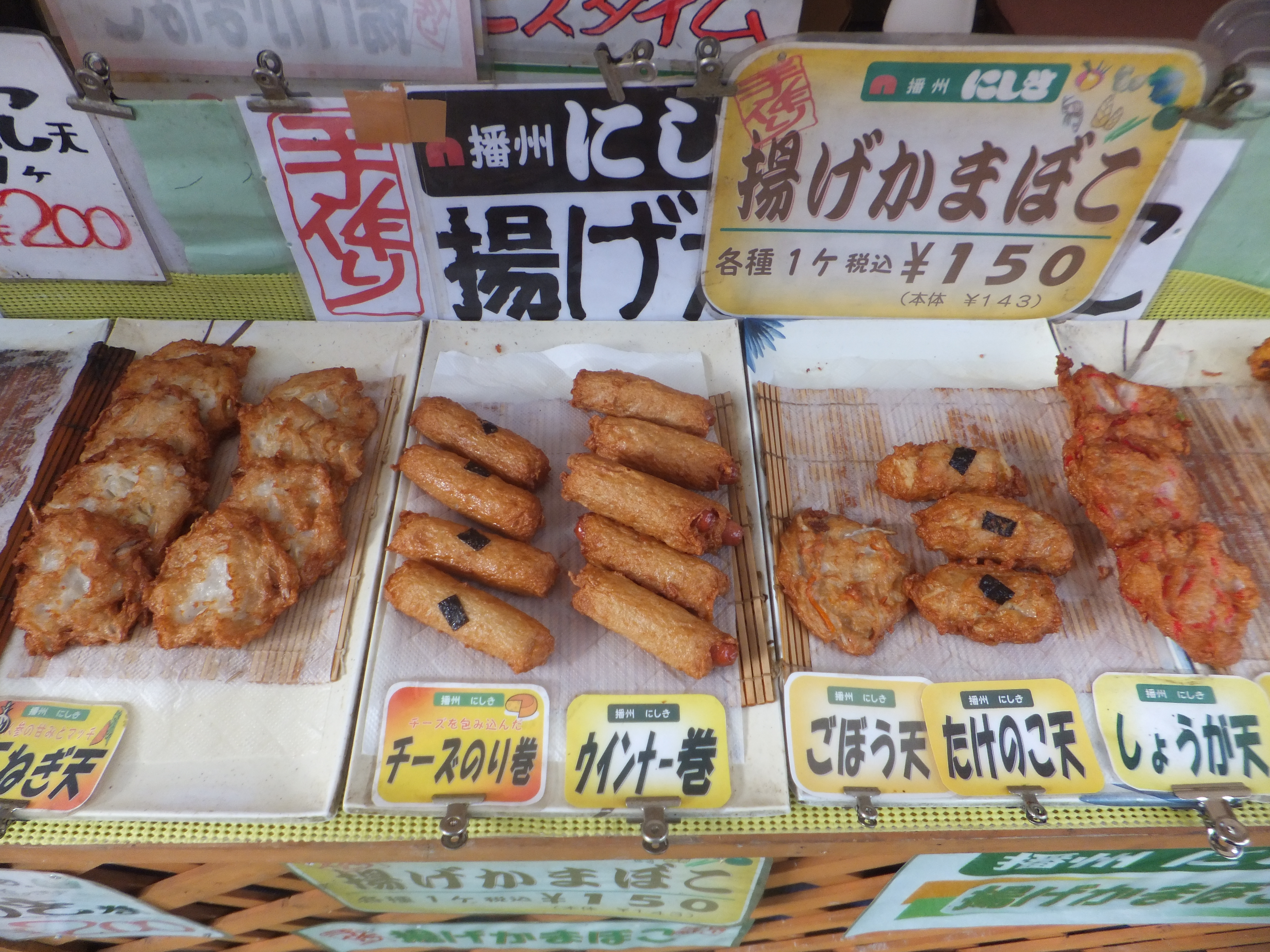
Deep fried kamaboko

=== Choice of fish ===
Early kamaboko was made with minced catfish (Silurus asotus).

The whitefish used to make surimi (擂り身, lit. 'ground meat') include:

- Chicken grunt (Parapristipoma trilineatum)
- Golden threadfin bream (Nemipterus virgatus)
- Lizardfish (Synodontidae)
- Japanese gissu (Pterothrissus gissu)
- Various shark species (Selachimorpha)
- Alaska pollock (Theragra chalcogramma)
- White croaker (Pennahia argentata)
- Nibe croaker (Nibea mitsukurii)
- Daggertooth pike conger (Muraenesox cinereus)
- Gnomefish (Scombrops boops)
- Black bass
  - Smallmouth bass (Micropterus dolomieu)
  - Largemouth bass (Micropterus salmoides)
  - Florida black bass (Micropterus floridanus)

== Kamaboko Day ==
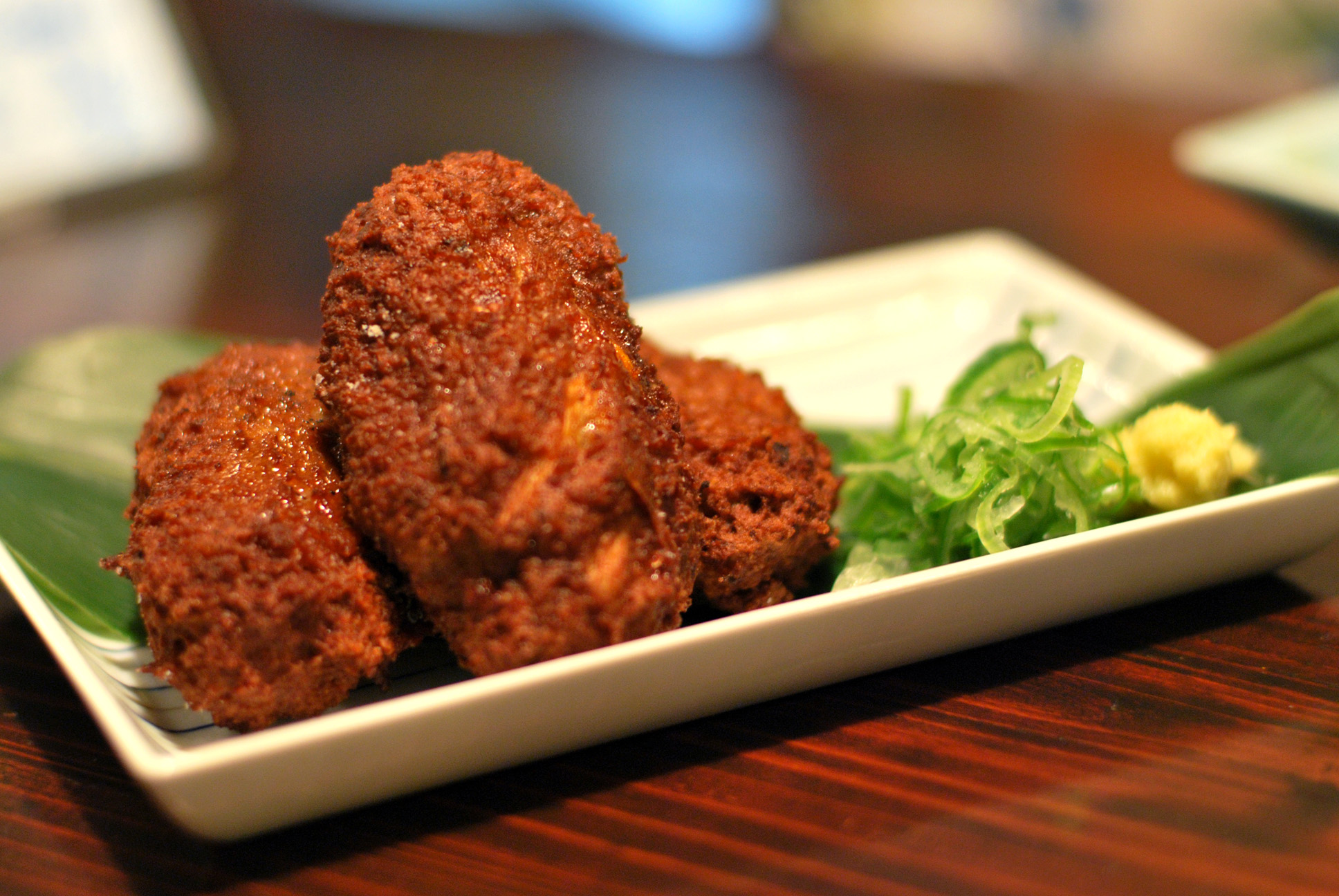
Obi-ten, a type of fried kamaboko

The Kamaboko organization of Japan specified November 15 for Kamaboko Day, established in 1983.

== In Hawaii ==
In Hawaii, pink or red-skinned kamaboko is readily available in grocery stores. It is a staple of saimin, a popular noodle soup created in Hawaii from the blending of Chinese and Japanese ingredients. Kamaboko is sometimes referred to as 'fish cake' in English.

After World War II, surplus Quonset huts became popular as housing in Hawaii. They became known as "kamaboko houses" due to the Quonset hut's half-cylindrical shape, similar to kamaboko.

== See also ==
- Chikuwa (grilled surimi)
- Fish ball (boiled surimi)
- Hanpen (boiled surimi)
- Satsuma-age (deep-fried surimi)
