= Surimi =

Meat paste, usually made from fish

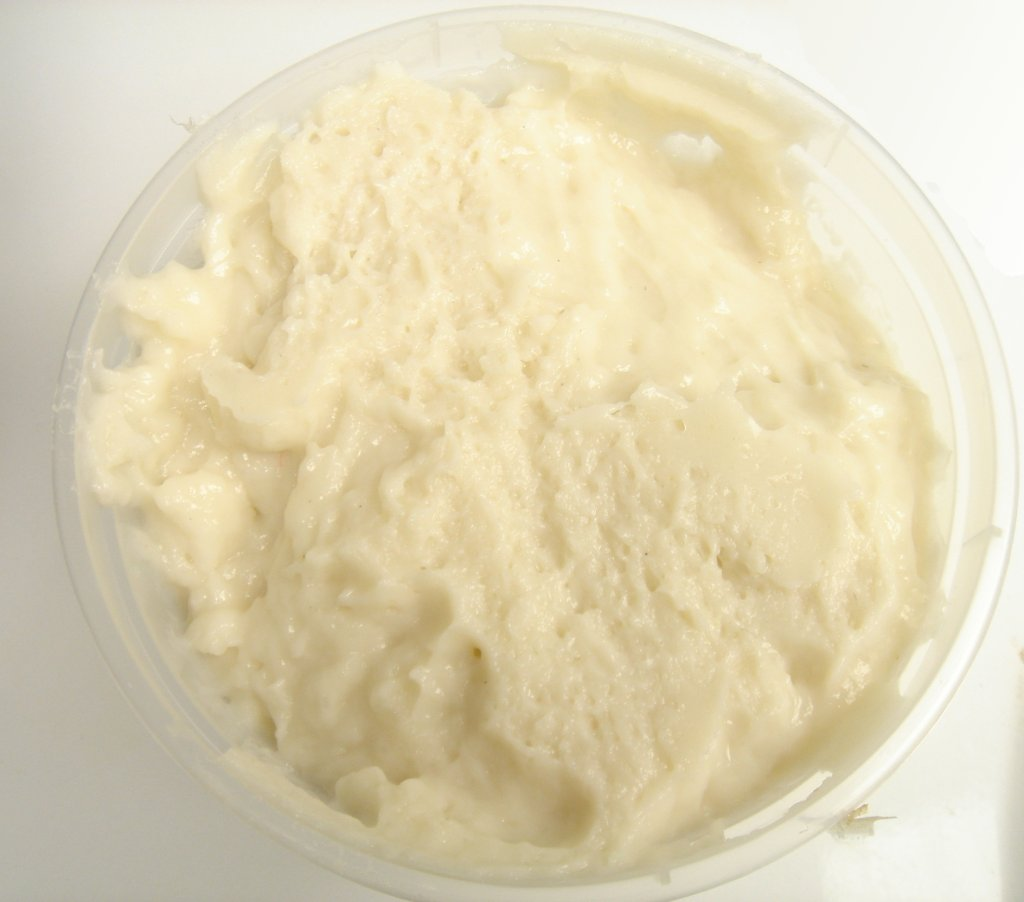
- Surimi made of ground fish
- Type: Fish paste
- Place of origin: Japan
- Main ingredients: Fish, meats

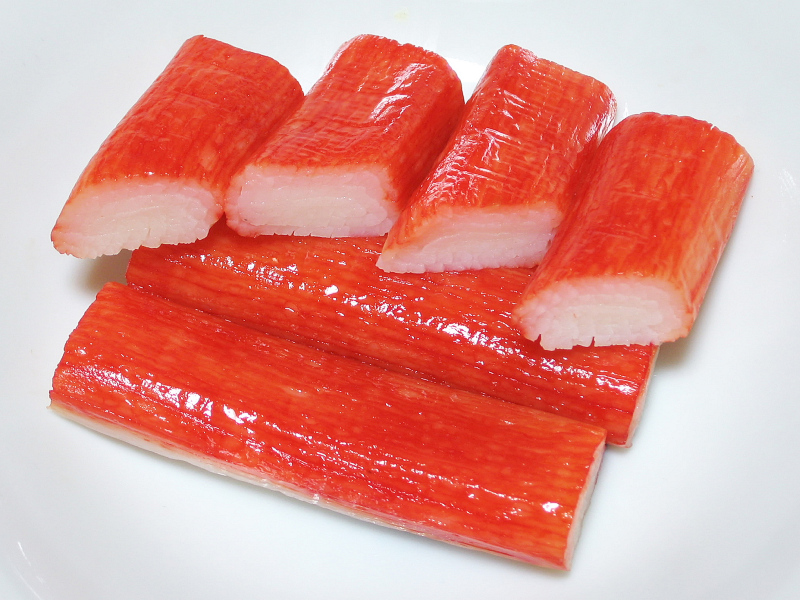
Crab sticks – imitation crab meat made from surimi

Surimi (Japanese: 擂り身 / すり身; 'ground meat') is a paste made from fish or other meat. It can also be any of a number of East Asian foods that use that paste as their primary ingredient. It is available in many shapes, forms, and textures, and is often used to mimic the texture and color of the meat of lobster, crab, grilled Japanese eel, or shellfish.

== History ==
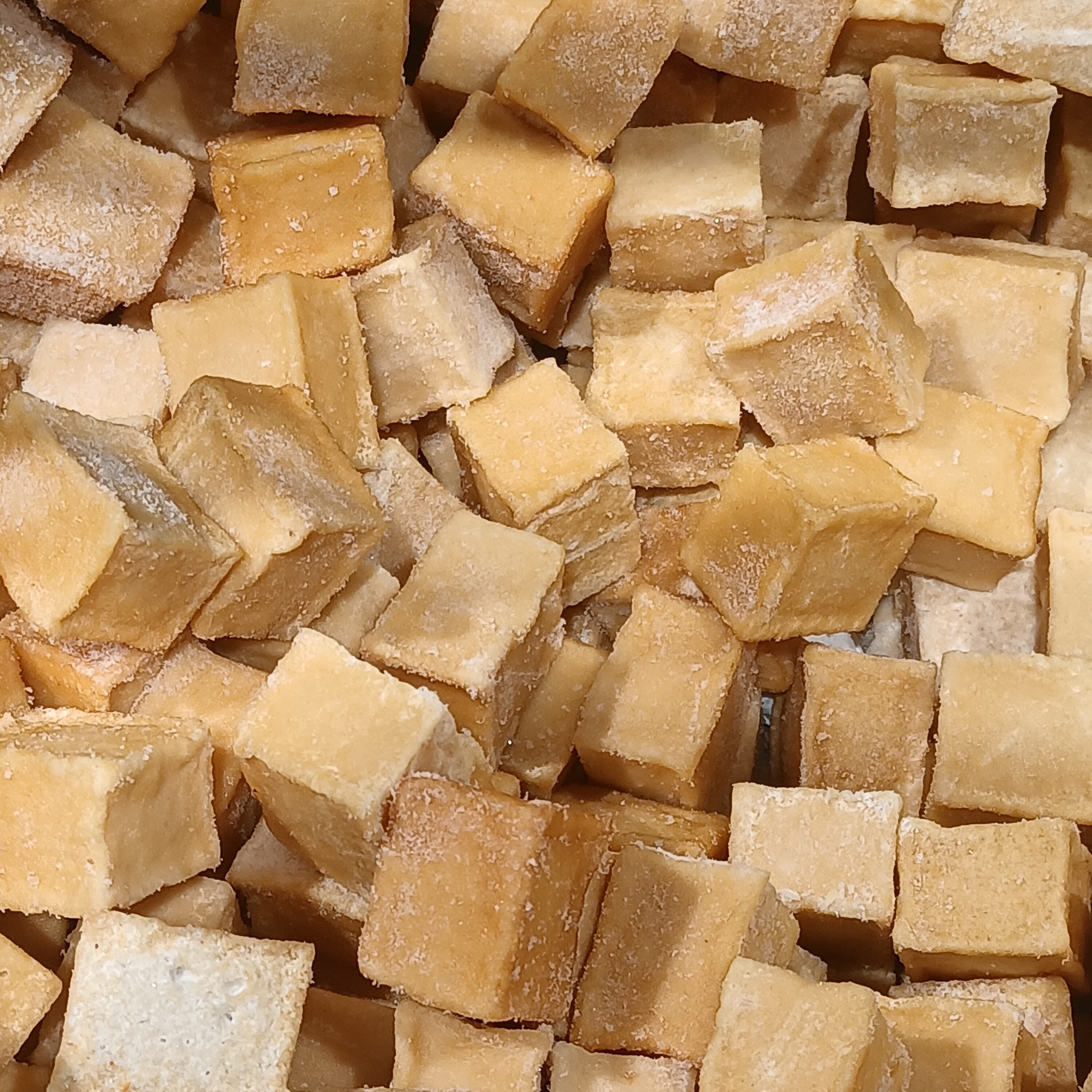
Chinese fish tofu, made of ground fish

Fish pastes have been a popular food in East Asia. In China, the food is used to make fish balls (魚蛋/魚丸) and ingredients in a thick soup known as geng (羹), common in Fujian cuisine. In Japan, the earliest surimi production was in 1115 for making kamaboko. Alaska pollock, native to the seas around Japan, played an important role in the development of processed surimi due to its high protein biomass. Satsumaage, chikuwa, and hanpen were other major surimi foods prior to 1960.

After World War II, machines were used to process surimi, but it was always sold fresh, since freezing had a negative effect on the finished product by denaturing the gel-forming capability of the surimi. Between 1945 and 1950, record catches of pollock in Hokkaido (primarily for harvesting the roe) resulted in large quantities of fish meat, so the Hokkaido Fisheries Research Station established a team to make better use of the excess. A team, led by K. Nishiya, discovered the addition of salt during the processing prevented the spongy texture that resulted after freezing, and also began using salted surimi in the manufacture of fish sausages. In 1969, Nishitani Yōsuke further discovered that the use of sucrose, or other carbohydrates, such as sorbitol, acted as a cryoprotectant by stabilizing the actomyosin in the surimi without denaturing the fish protein the way salt does.

Surimi industrial technology developed by Japan in the early 1960s promoted the growth of the surimi industry. In 1963, the government of Hokkaido applied for a patent on the surimi processing technology, and companies, such as Nippon Suisan and Maruha-Nichiro, implemented at-sea frozen fish processing in the mid-1960s. After a peak of surimi consumption in 1975, consumption in Japan began to decline as the preference for other meats (beef, pork) went up, and lower quality products on the market influenced consumer opinion of surimi overall. Although the quality standards for fish in Japanese surimi products were quite high, the consumer perception of surimi generally attributes it to by-catch and lower quality fish.

When the Magnuson–Stevens Fishery Conservation and Management Act was enacted in 1976, the United States became involved in the surimi industry through joint ventures with Japanese fish processors. Imitation crab products were developed in Japan between 1973 and 1975, and although not as popular in Japan, opened the door to international surimi consumption. Further developments for using different types of fish were made since the 1980s. The first US surimi processing plant was built in 1984 on Kodiak Island, and Canada in 1995, aided by Japanese technicians.

In the early 1990s and the late 2000s, the price of surimi skyrocketed. This affected many small Japanese kamaboko companies, causing many to go bankrupt due to cost of materials as well as the diminishing habit of eating kamaboko daily by younger generations. As the price rose, surimi industry sought methods to minimize waste. The decanter technique, developed in the mid-1990s, further improved the recovery of fish meat during the washing process.

== Use and labelling ==
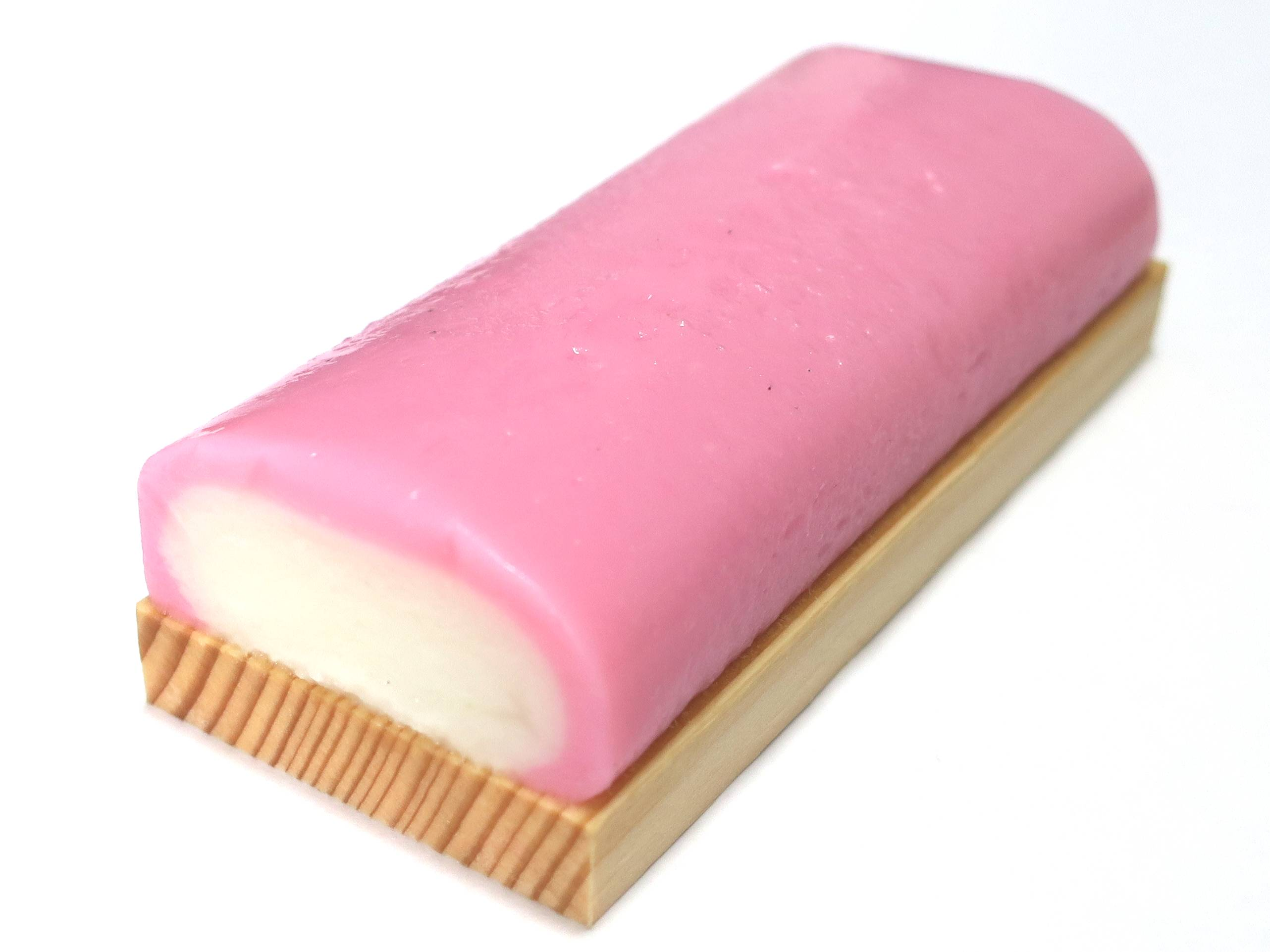
Japanese kamaboko is made of surimi

Two to three million tons of fish from around the world, amounting to 2–3 percent of the world fisheries' supply, are used for the production of surimi and surimi-based products. The United States and Japan are major producers of surimi and surimi-based products. Thailand has become an important producer. China's role as producer is increasing. Many newcomers to the surimi industry have emerged, including Lithuania, Vietnam, Chile, the Faroe Islands, France, and Malaysia.

In the United Kingdom, due to tightening advertising/labeling regulations, the surimi product previously sold as crab sticks is now sold as seafood sticks (since it contains no crab), though the older term is still recognized by most older people, and the red coloring to imitate the appearance of crabs is still applied.

== Chemistry ==
=== Composition ===
According to the United States Department of Agriculture National Nutrient Database, fish surimi contains about 76% water, 15% protein, 6.85% carbohydrate, and 0.9% fat.

=== Chemistry of curing ===
The curing of the fish paste is caused by the polymerization of myosin when heated. The species of fish is the most important factor that affects this curing process. Many pelagic fish with higher fat contents lack the needed type of heat-curing myosin and are not used for surimi (when they are used, another source heat-curable proteins such as egg white is added).

Borax was once widely used in Asian fish balls to make the texture bouncier and to preserve the water content. It is now banned in multiple countries (including Taiwan), but clandestine use has continued (such as in 2008). The legal replacement is polyphosphate, which provides a similar effect without the toxicity of borax.

== Gallery ==
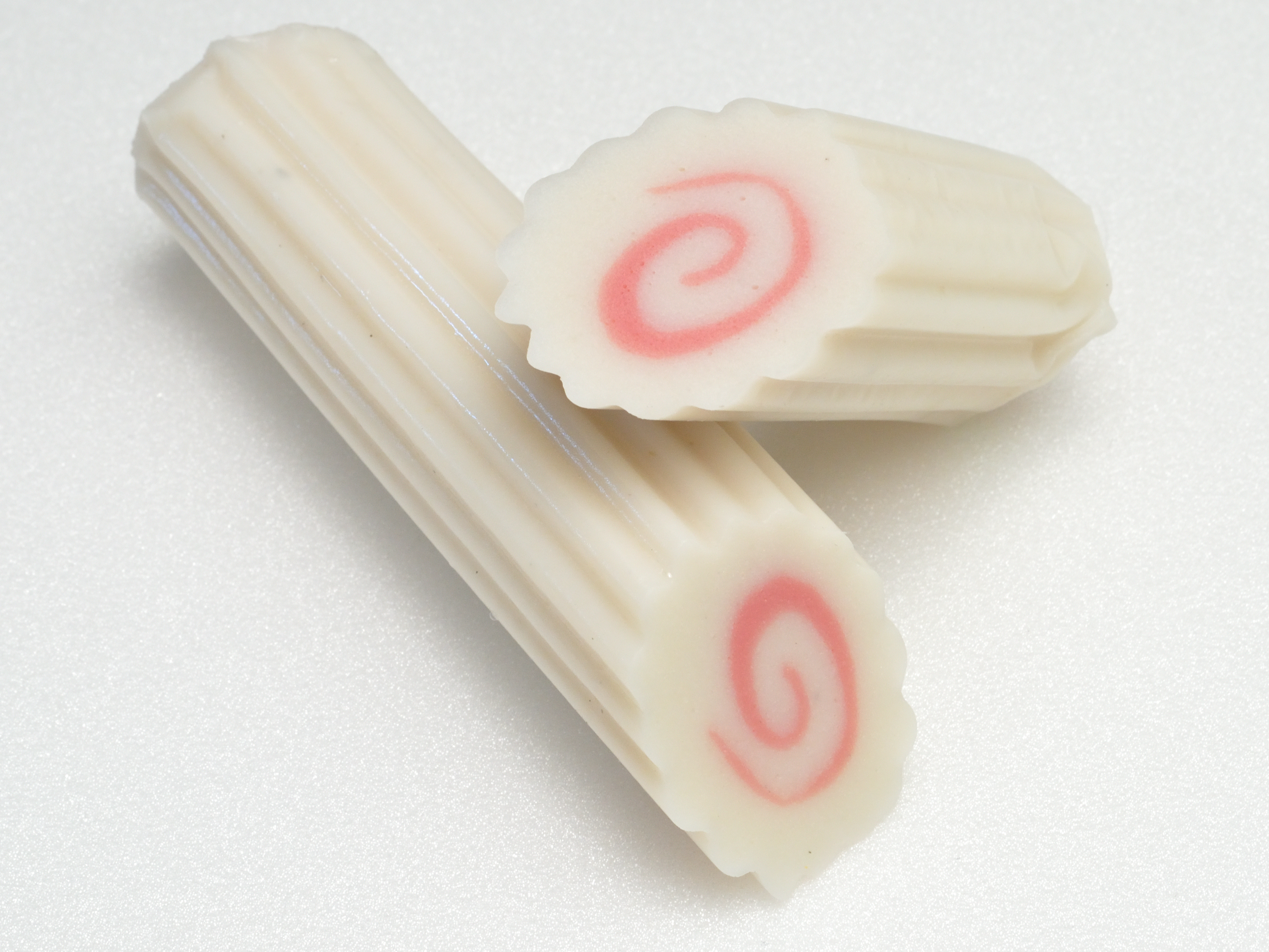
Narutomaki

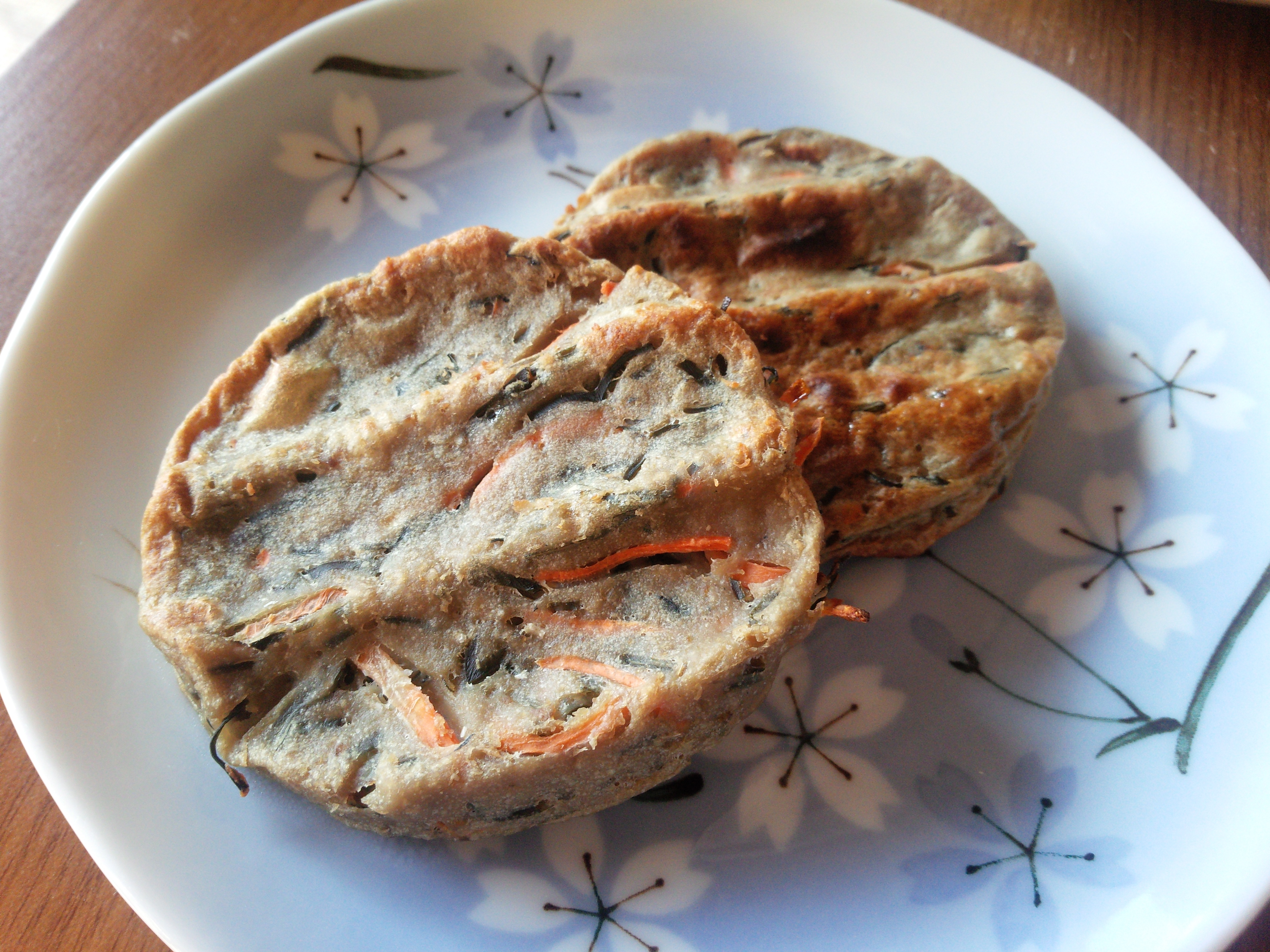
Iwashidama (sardine surimi)

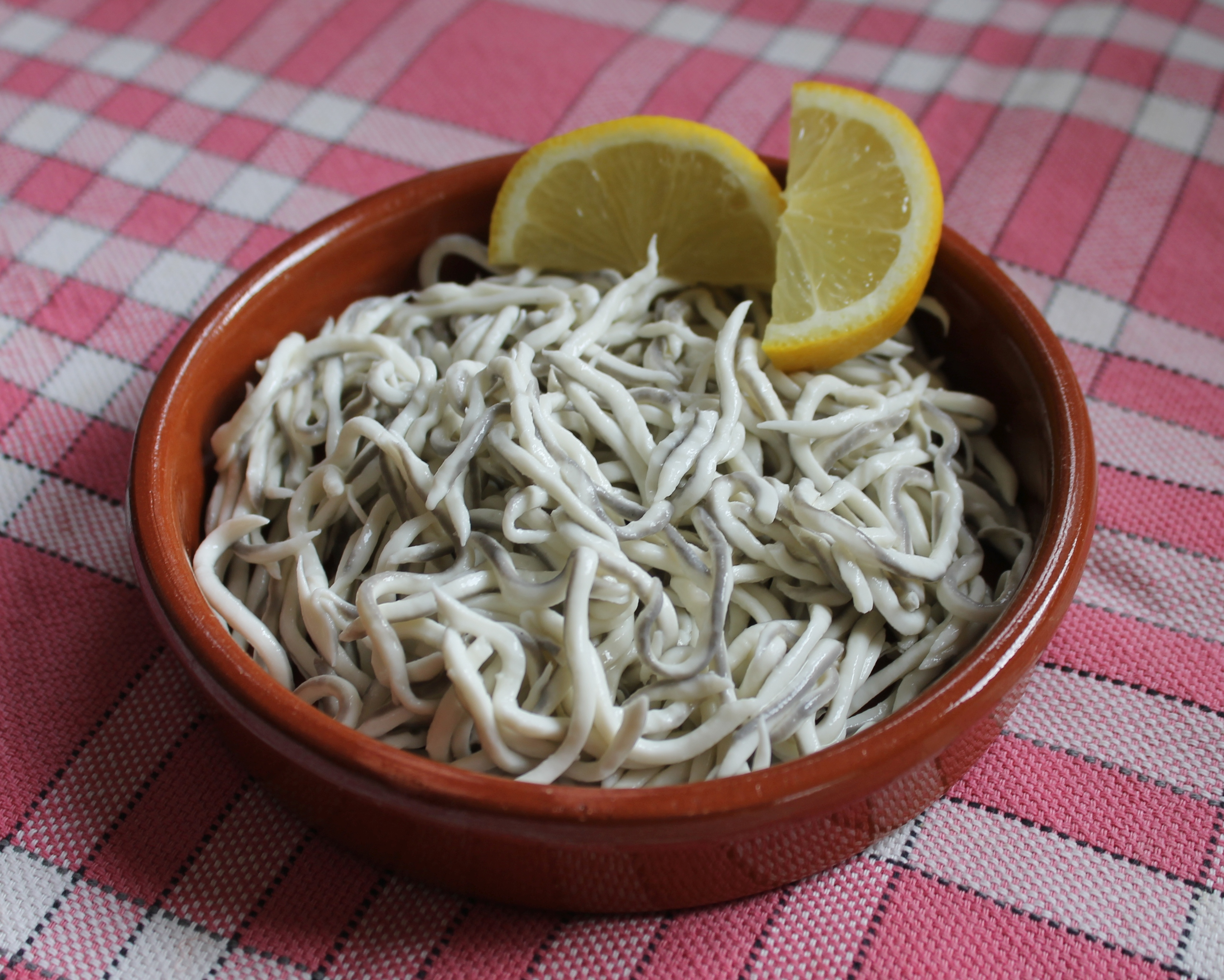
Spanish gulas

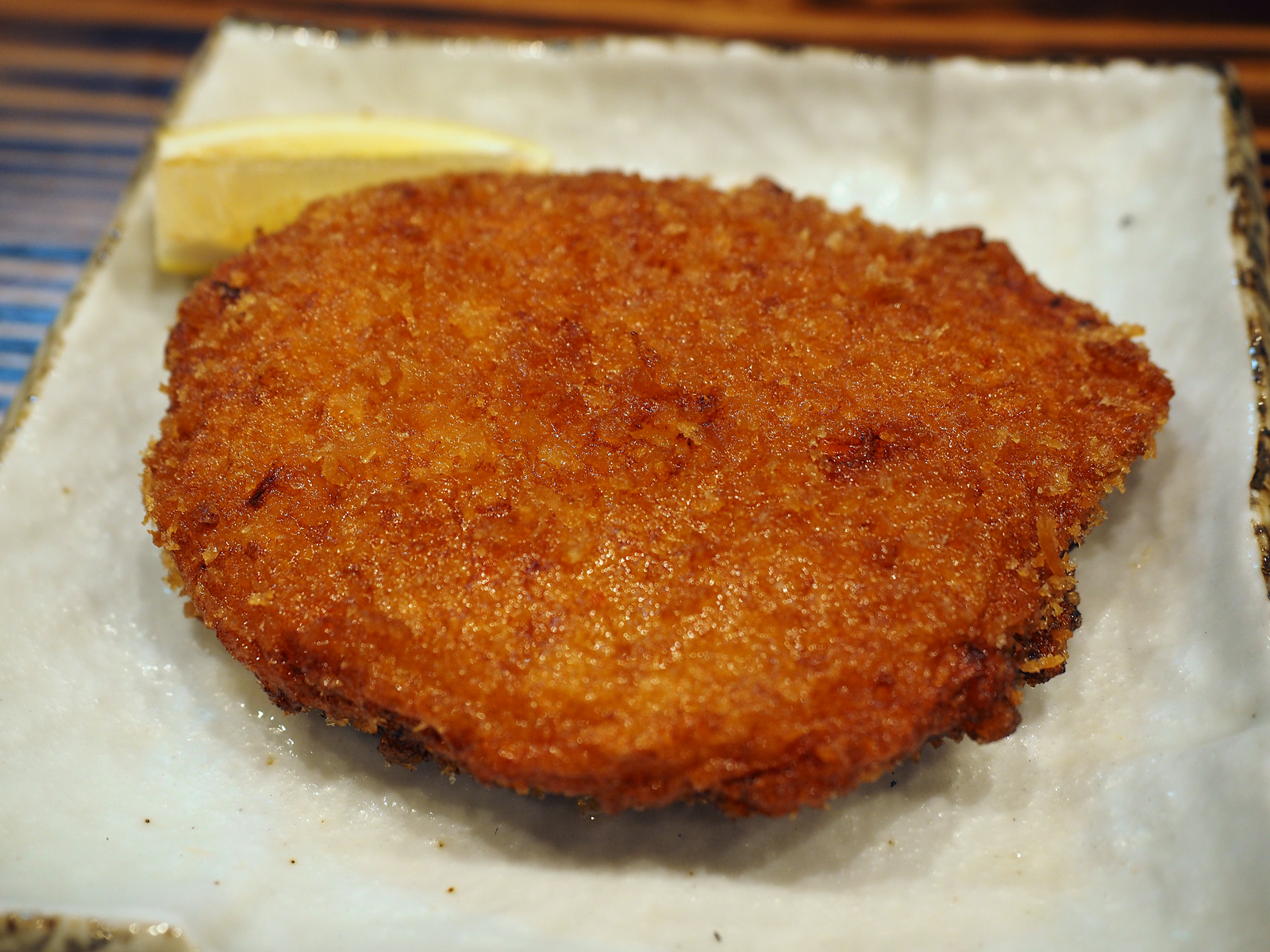
Korokke made of fish surimi

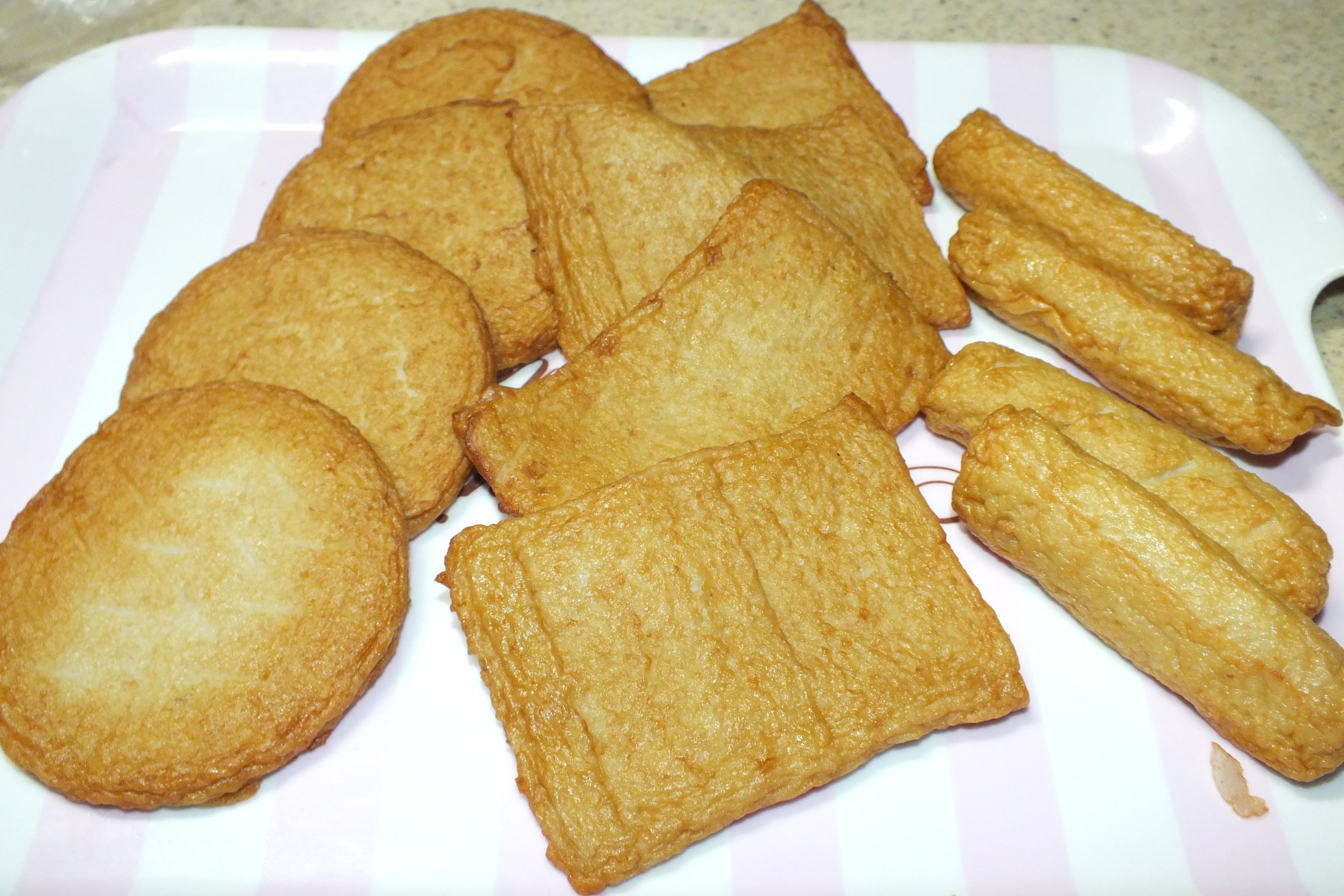
Satsuma-age

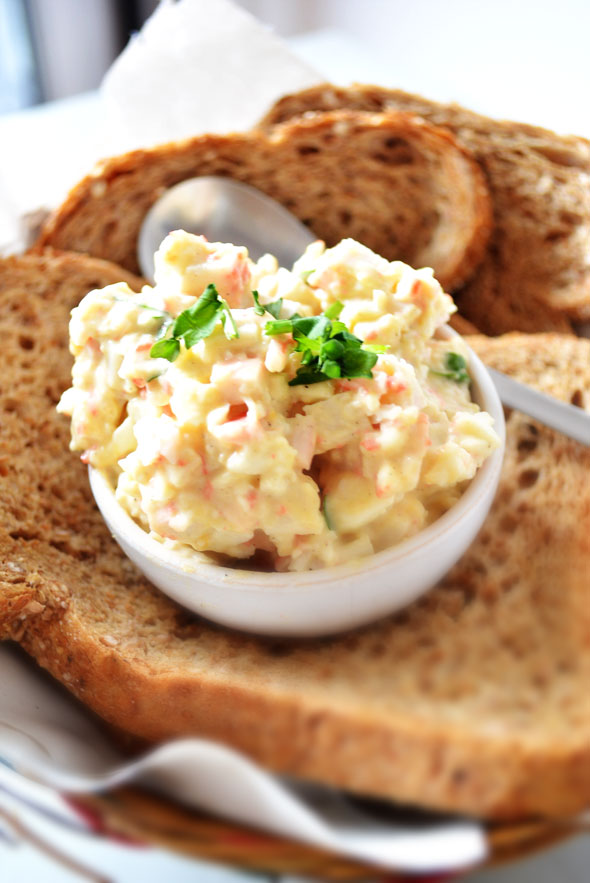
Surimi salad and bread

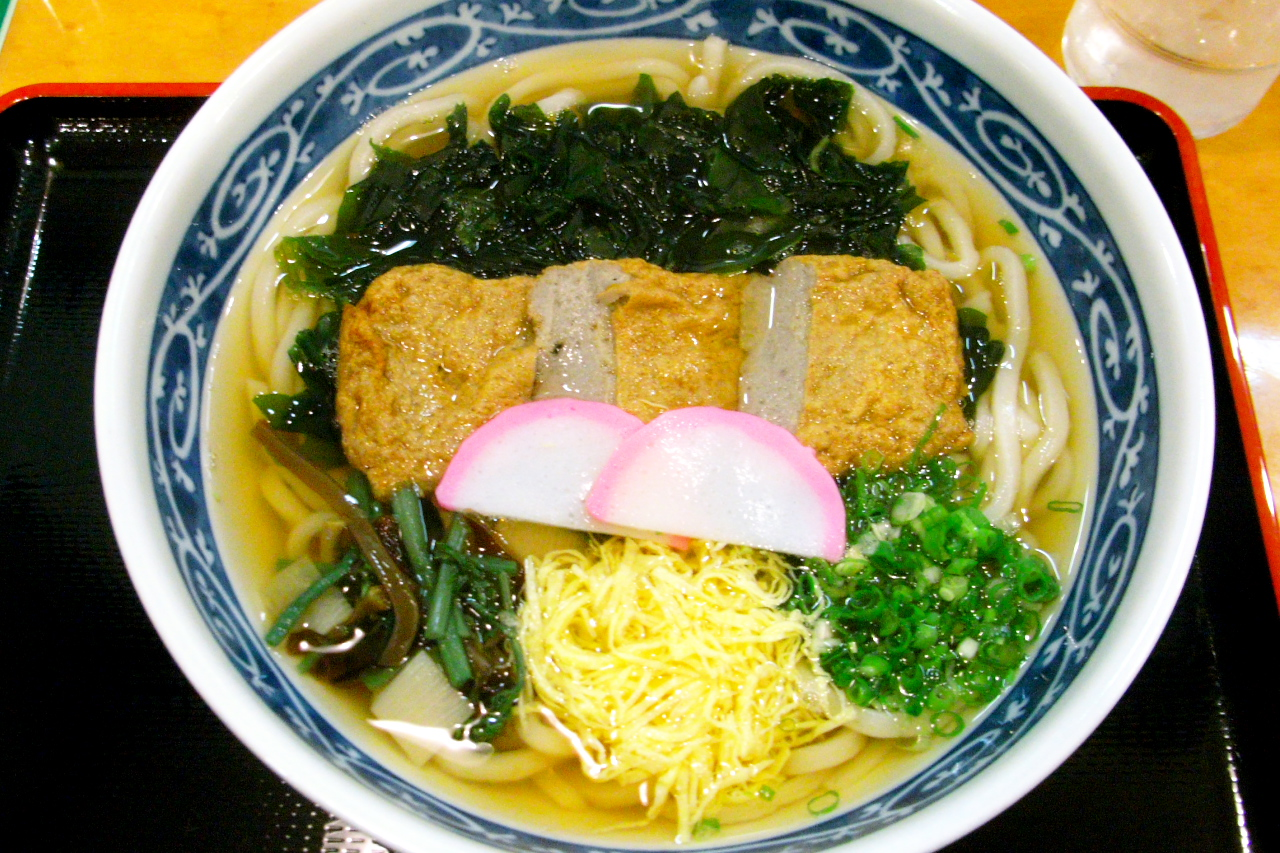
Udon with jakoten slices

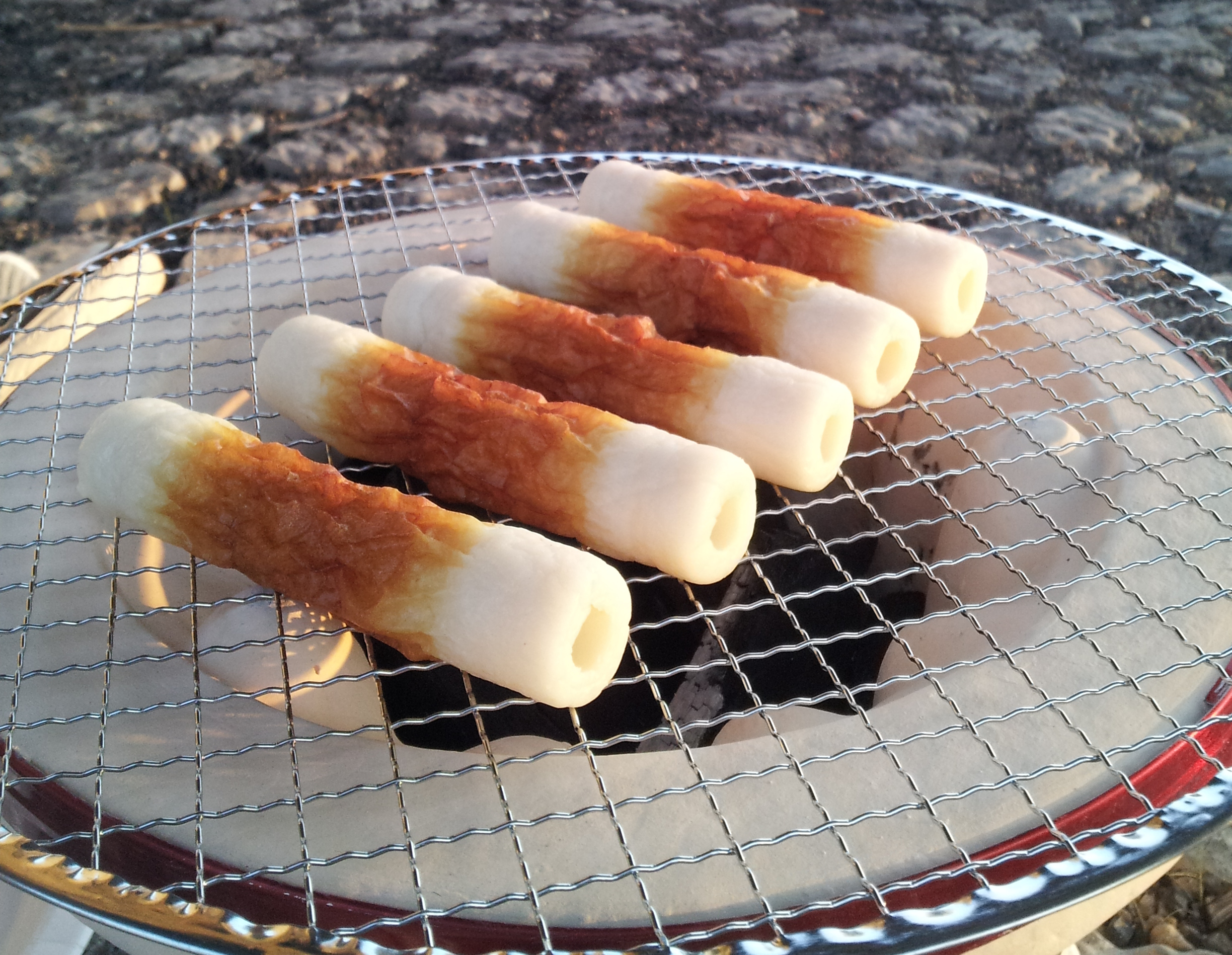
Chikuwa made of surimi, on a shichirin grill

== See also ==
- List of seafood dishes
- List of Japanese dishes
- Fisheries management
- Fish paste
- Fishcakes
- Fish balls
