= Satsuma-age =

Fried fishcake originating from Kagoshima, Japan

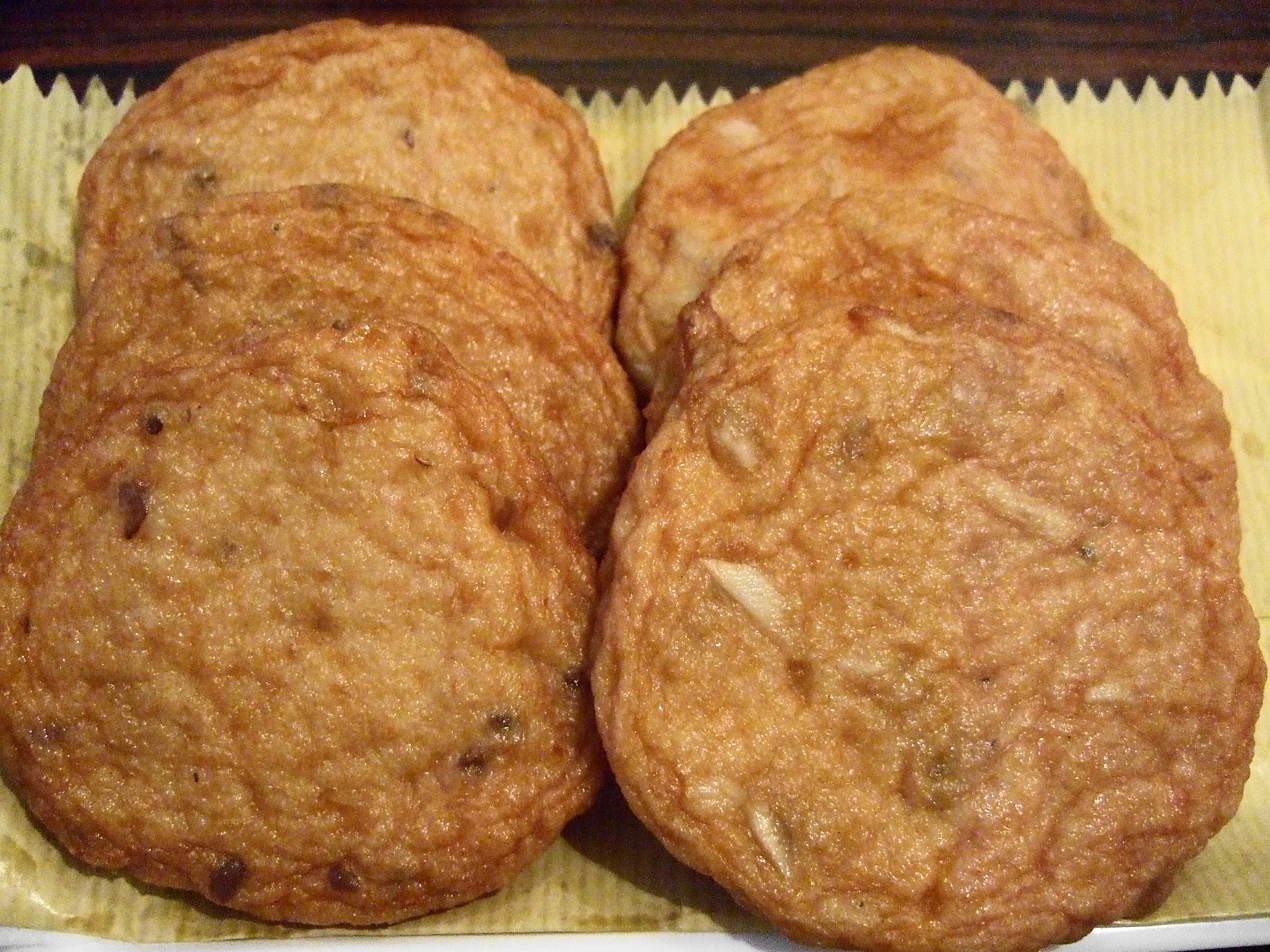
- Place of origin: Japan
- Region or state: Kagoshima
- Main ingredients: Surimi

Satsuma-age (薩摩揚げ) is a fried fishcake originating from Kagoshima, Japan. Surimi and flour are mixed to make a compact paste that is solidified through frying. It is a specialty of the Satsuma region. It is known by a variety of regional names throughout Japan.

The paste is made from fish and seasoned with salt, sugar, and other spices and molded into several shapes. It is made not only from ground fish but can include wood ear, beni shōga, onion, Welsh onion and other vegetables, squid, octopus, shrimp and other seafood, and spices. In fishing villages, it is made from local fish, such as sardines, shark, bonito or mackerel. It is often made by mixing two or more kinds of fish.

People eat satsuma-age plain or lightly roasted and dipped in ginger and soy sauce or mustard and soy sauce. It is used in oden, udon, sara udon or nimono (stewed dishes).

== Composition ==
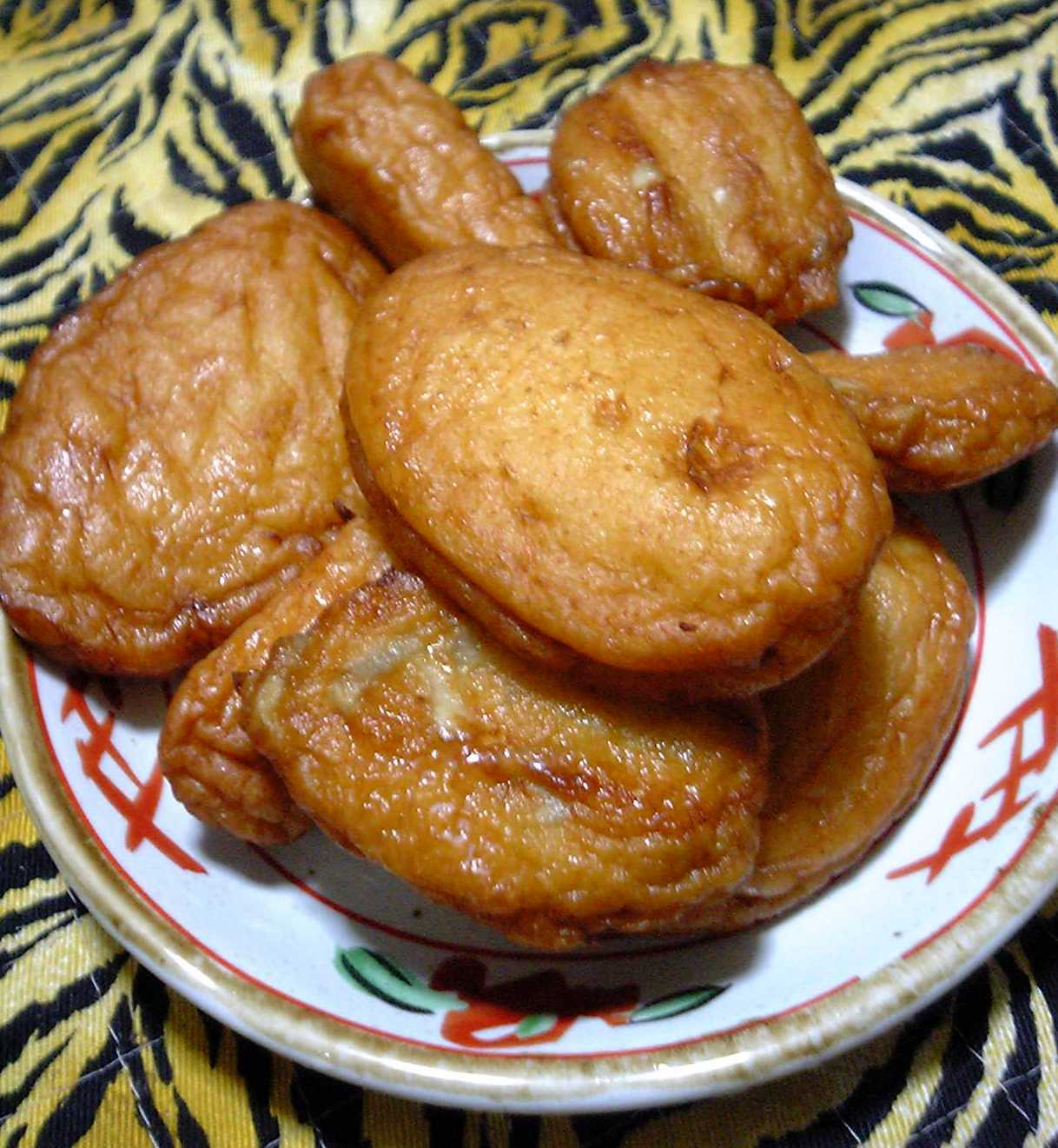
Cooked satsuma-age

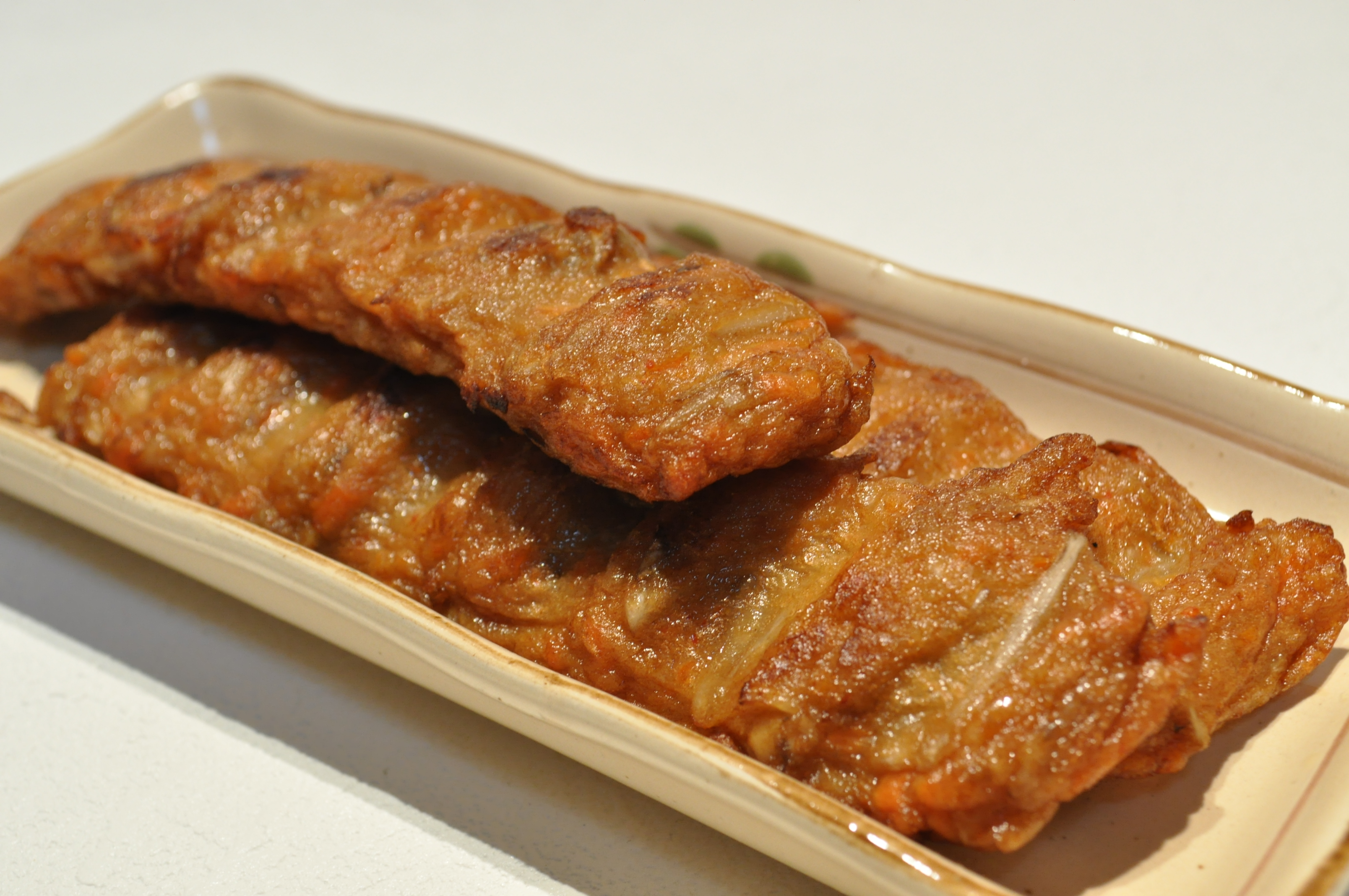
Satsua-age with gobō

Commonly Satsuma-age used cod as a filling; however, as cod stocks have been depleted other varieties of white fish are used, such as haddock or whiting. Satsuma-age may use oily fish such as salmon for a markedly different flavour.

The fish used to make surimi (Japanese: 擂り身, literally "ground meat") include:

- Alaska pollock (Theragra chalcogramma)
- Lizardfish (Synodontidae)
- White croaker (Pennahia argentata)
- Daggertooth pike conger (Muraenesox cinereus)
- Japanese Spanish mackerel (Scomberomorus niphonius)
- Flying fish (Exocoetidae)
- Various sardine species (Sardine)
- Various shark species (Selachimorpha)
- Skipjack tuna (Katsuwonus pelamis)
- Various mackerel species (Mackerel)
- Okhotsk atka mackerel (Pleurogrammus azonus)
- Tilapia
  - Mozambique tilapia (Oreochromis mossambicus)
  - Nile tilapia (Oreochromis niloticus niloticus)
- Black bass
  - Smallmouth bass (Micropterus dolomieu)
  - Largemouth bass (Micropterus salmoides)
  - Florida black bass (Micropterus floridanus)

== History ==
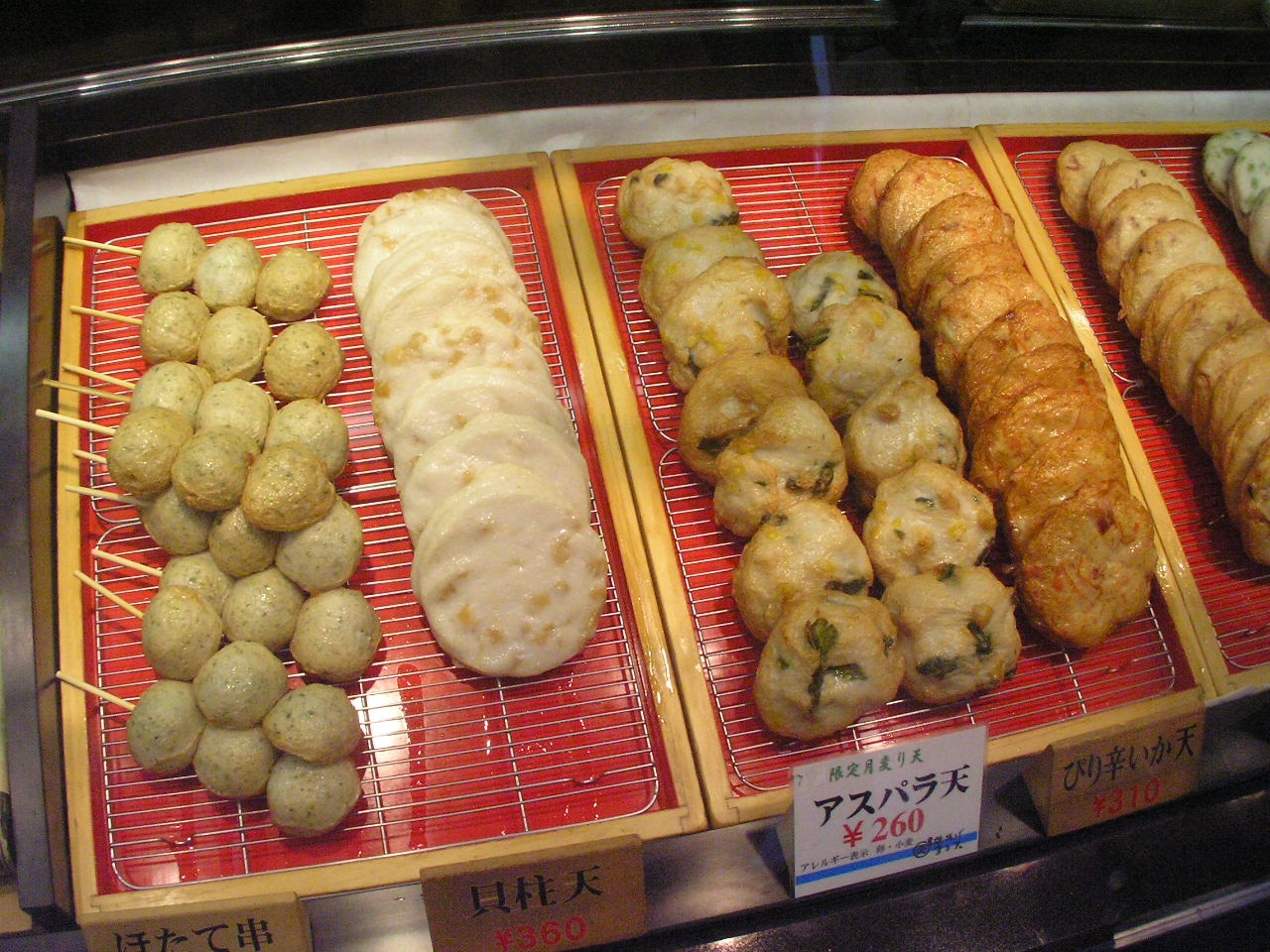
Satsuma-age shop

There are varied histories of Satsuma-age, but the most famous birthplace is the Satsuma district in Kagoshima. It is said that, in about 1864, the Shimazu clan brought it to Satsuma from Okinawa through some exchange and invasion. In those days, Okinawans called fried-boiled fish paste chigiage. After it was brought to Kagoshima, it was produced as tsukiage and selected as one of the best 100 local dishes.

== Regional names ==
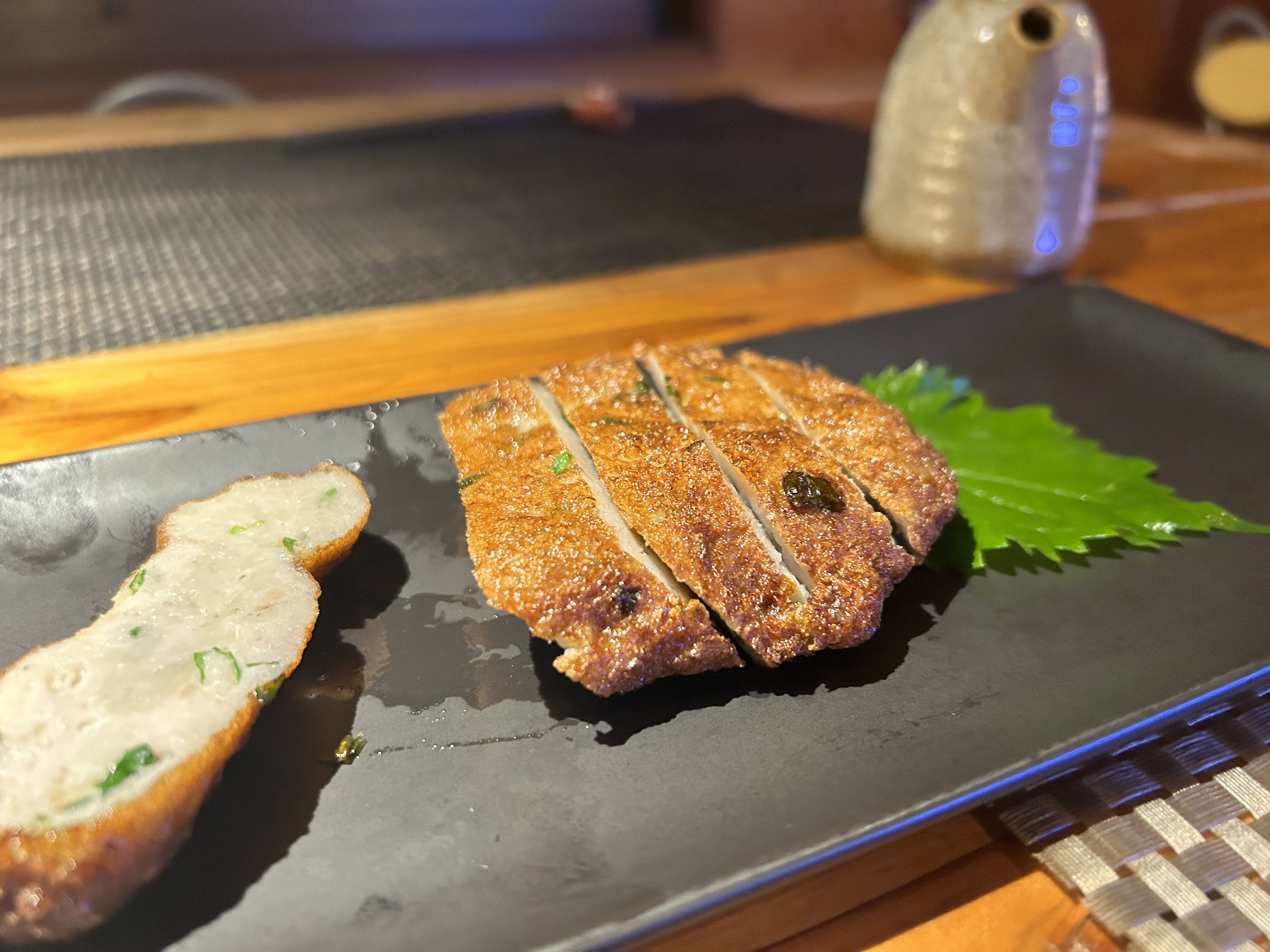
Sliced satsuma-age from Yakushima, Kagoshima

Depending on the region, the dish is known under different names. In Tōhoku and the Kantō region it is called "Satsuma-age" after its place of origin in Kagoshima. In the Chubu region it is known as "Hanpen". Hokkaido and west Japan people call it "Tempura" (different from Tempura). In Kyushu and Okinawa, this dish is called "Tempura", "Tsukeage" or "Chikiagi".

== Varieties ==
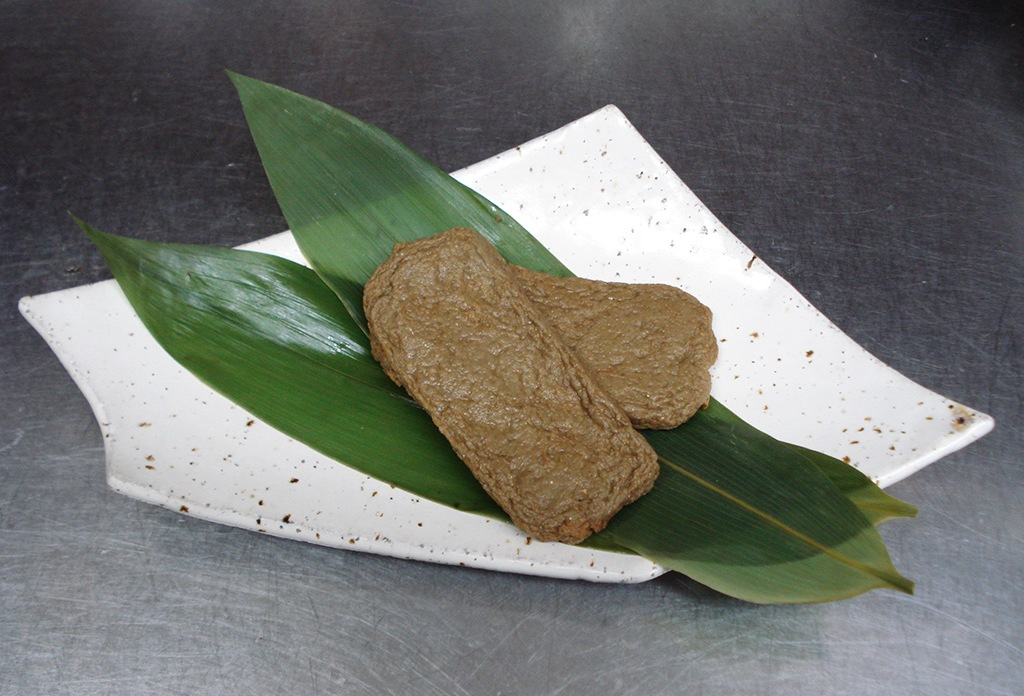
Jakoten (じゃこ天)

- Hiraten (ひら天): flat satsuma age
- Maruten (丸天): Satsuma-age like a thin disk. People in Kyushu, mainly Fukuoka, eat them with udon.
- Gobouten (ごぼう天, ごぼう巻き): Satsuma-age wrapped around burdock-like sticks.
- Ikaten (いか天): Satsuma-age wrapped around squid tentacles.
- Takoten (たこ天): Satsuma-age wrapped around cut octopus. There is a kind of ball shaped like takoyaki.
- Tamanegiten (タマネギ天): with onion.
- Bakudan (爆弾, 'Bomb'): Satsuma-age which wrapped around a boiled egg
- Honeku (ほねく), honeten: These are short versions of honekuri-tempura. This is a local dish in north Wakayama. Whole cutlass fish (Largehead hairtail:Trichiurus lepturus) are ground and fried. They have a unique smell.
- Jakoten (じゃこ天) is a special product of Uwajima in southern Ehime prefecture. Jakoten has a long history, having been eaten since the Edo period. It is made from small fish caught nearby that are blended into a paste and then fried.
- Gansu (がんす) (local dish in Hiroshima) is a fry made of breaded ground whitefish and a kind of cutlet.

== Outside Japan ==
- In Korea, the term for satsuma-age is eomuk (어묵) or simply odeng. Large cities like Busan and Seoul sell these products as street food during winter and fall seasons.
- In Taiwan, satsuma-age is sold as tianbula (Chinese: 甜不辣; pinyin: tiánbùlà; lit. 'sweet', 'not spicy'). It was introduced to Taiwan under Japanese rule by people from Kyushu, where satsuma-age is commonly known as tempura. It is often used as an ingredient for oden, hot pot and lu wei.
- In Vietnam, there is also a dish similar to Satsuma-age, which is often called "Chả cá".

== See also ==
- Kamaboko
- Chikuwa
- Fishcake
