= Narutomaki =

Japanese food topping

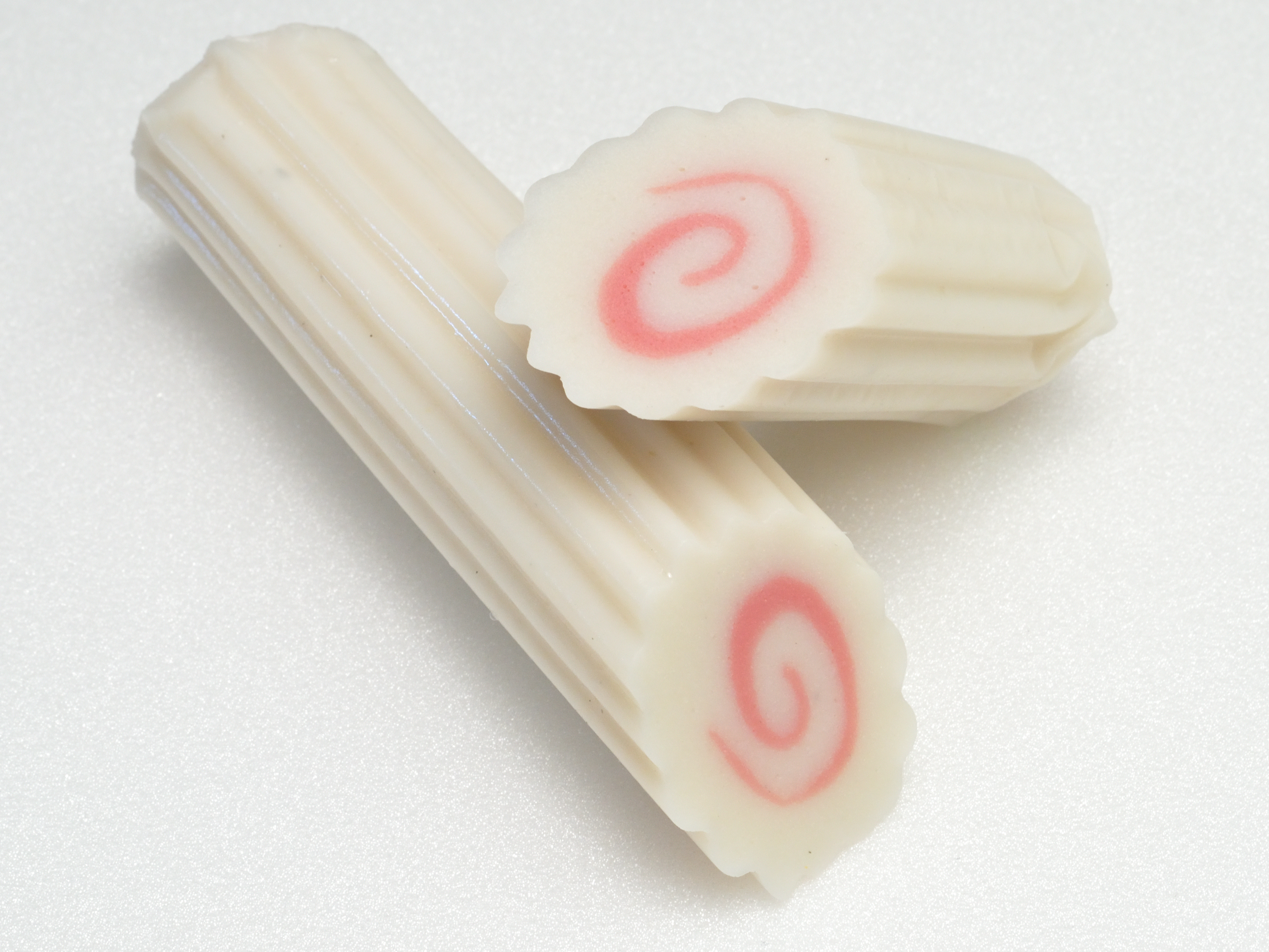
- Narutomaki before slicing
- Type: Kamaboko
- Place of origin: Japan
- Region or state: East Asia
- Main ingredients: Surimi (ground fish)

Narutomaki (鳴門巻き/なると巻き) or naruto (ナルト/なると) is a type of kamaboko, or cured fish surimi produced in Japan. Each cloud-shaped slice of naruto has a pink or red spiral pattern, which is meant to resemble the Naruto whirlpools in the Naruto Strait between Awaji Island and Naruto, Tokushima Prefecture on Shikoku Island in Japan.

Naruto is a common topping on Japanese noodles such as ramen and udon. In some regions of Japan, it is also used in oden and nimono.

Kamaboko has been known in Japan from at least 1115 CE; it spread among commoners during the Edo period (1600–1867). In 1823, steamed surimi with a spiral pattern was invented and named "naruto kamaboko", as opposed to "mushi kamaboko", which is now known as kamaboko proper. It became a common ingredient in ramen in the 20th century. In the 1960s, hydrogen peroxide was used for bleaching the white surimi in commercially produced narutomaki, leading to public health concerns.

In the 21st century, narutomaki is usually made from frozen surimi. To make the pink spiral, a sheet of white surimi is covered with a thin layer of pink-coloured surimi and rolled up before steaming. In early versions of narutomaki, the spiral was made by putting a sheet of nori on top of white surimi. The city of Yaizu, Shizuoka is known for its production.

Narutomaki has its own emoji: 🍥 (U+1F365). The word is also used as a slang term for the at sign "@". Narutomaki also inspired the name of Naruto Uzumaki, the protagonist of the Naruto manga series.

== Bibliography ==
- Park, Jae W., ed. (2014). Surimi and Surimi Seafood. ISBN 978-1-4398-9858-1.
- Tsuji, Kinko; Müller, Stefan C., eds. (2019). Spirals and Vortices: In Culture, Nature, and Science. The Frontiers Collection. Springer International Publishing AG. ISBN 978-3-030-05798-5.
- Umemoto, Shigeru; Enokibara, Kazuko; Amano, Keishi (April 1968). "A Modified Method for Hydrogen Peroxide Determination and Its Residual Content in Commercial Fish Jelly Products ("Kamaboko" and Related Kinds)". Journal of the Food Hygienic Society of Japan. 9 (2): 139–146.
