= Pudpod =

Fish dish eaten by the Waray people

- Alternative names: pudpud, podpod
- Course: main course, breakfast
- Place of origin: Philippines
- Region or state: Eastern Samar
- Serving temperature: Hot or room temperature
- Main ingredients: fish, salt, calamansi

Pudpod is a smoked fish patty eaten by the Waray people in Eastern Samar, Philippines. It is usually made from bolinaw (anchovies), but can also be made from larger types of fish like tuna and shark. The fish is first cleaned and boiled and then the fins and large bones are removed. It is mixed with salt and calamansi juice and pounded flat into patties. The patties are then smoked on bamboo platforms over smouldering coconut husks for a few hours.

They can be eaten as is, but are usually braised or fried. They are served (usually with dipping sauces) as an accompaniment to rice or lugaw (rice porridge). They can also be eaten with other boiled starchy food like camote (sweet potato), balanghoy (cassava), and saba bananas.

Pudpod in Visayan languages means "to pound" or "to grind". It can also refer to chorizo pudpud, a different Ilonggo dish from Negros made from fried chorizo sausages without the casing.

== See also ==
- Tinapa
- Daing
- Tapa
- Bagoong
- Kinilaw
- Fish paste
