= Hanpen =

Food in Japan

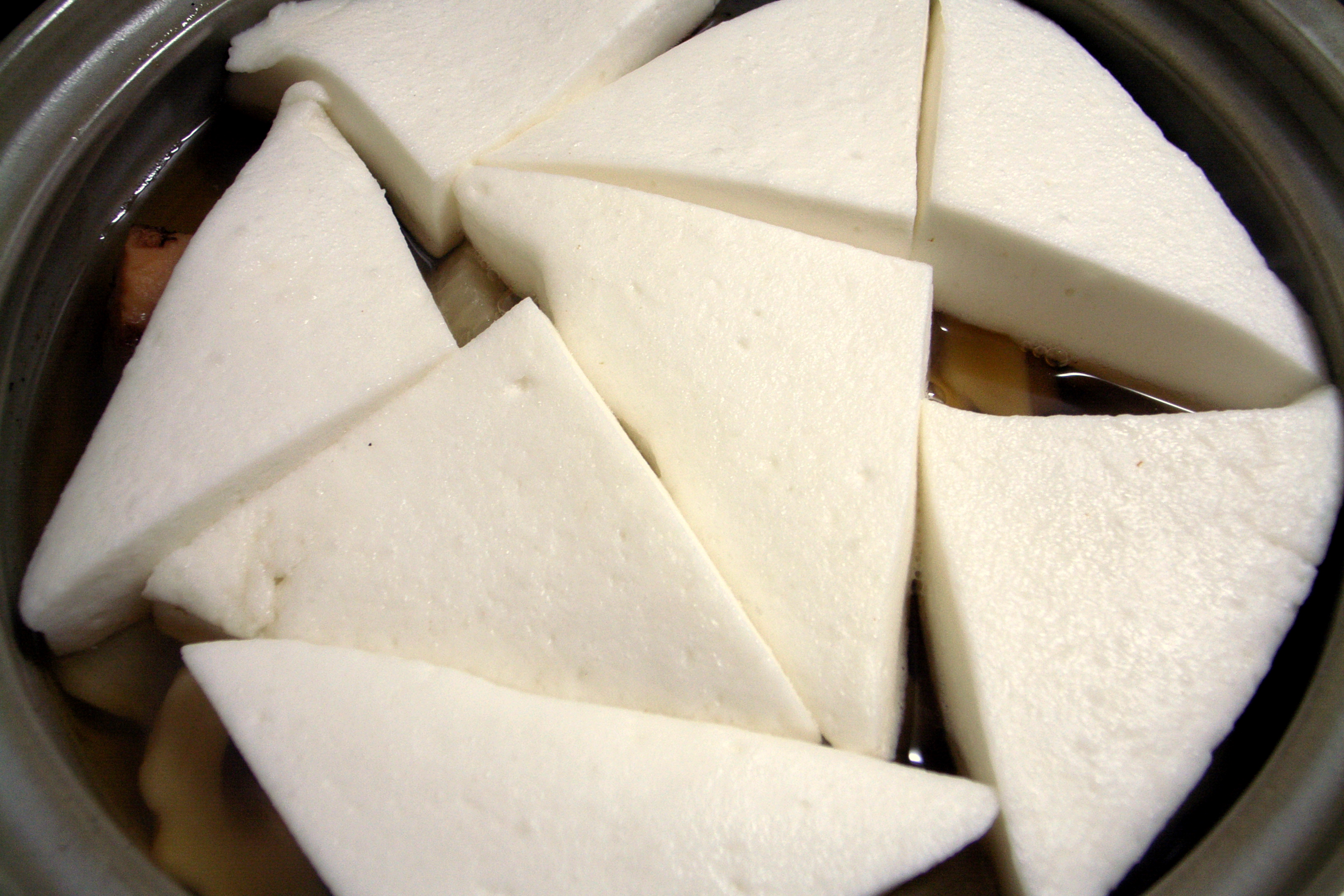
Hanpen

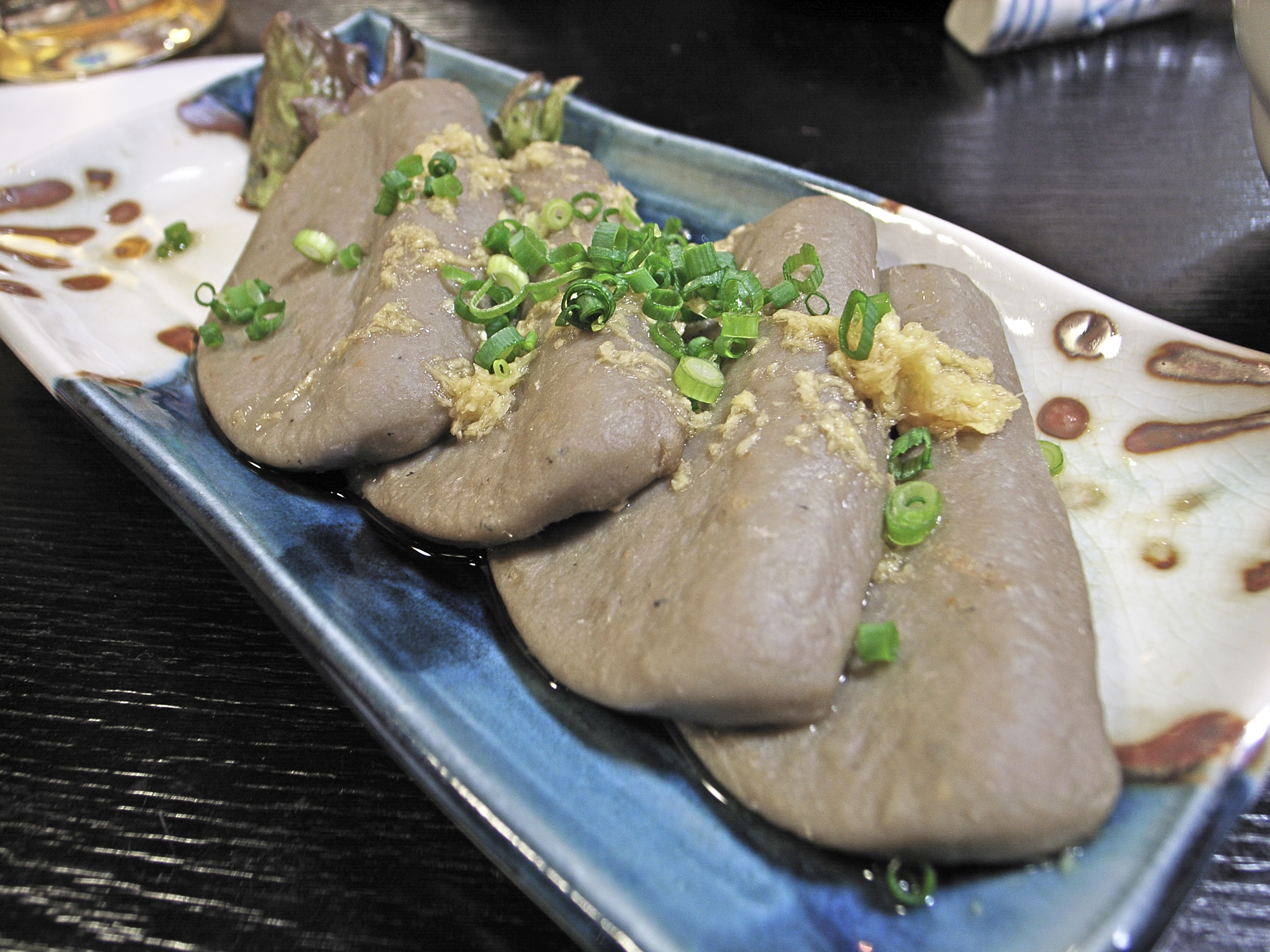
Kuro hanpen (黒はんぺん), literally "black hanpen"

Hanpen (半片) is a Japanese food product with regional variations. It is usually a white square, triangle or round ingredient made with surimi (fish or meat paste) and starch, with a soft, mild taste, added to oden or other similar dishes.

== Origin ==
Hanpen is believed to have been invented during the Edo period in Japan by a chef, Hanpei (半平) of Suruga, and the dish is named after him. Another theory suggests that because it is triangle shaped and appears to have been cut in half from a square, it is a half (半, han) piece (片, pen).

== Preparation ==
Hanpen is usually made from grated Japanese mountain yam (tororo), Alaska pollock, salt, and seaweed stock (kombu-dashi). It can be eaten as an ingredient in oden or other Japanese soups and stews. It can also be fried or broiled. The somewhat spongy texture absorbs flavors from sauces and broths. The soft, uniform texture and mild taste are considered especially suited to the some specialized diets.

== Variations ==
In Shizuoka Prefecture, whole sardines are used to make hanpen, and the resulting product has a bluish-gray color. This is called kuro hanpen (黒はんぺん), literally "black hanpen". Uki-hanpen is made from processed shark meat. Other regional hanpen varieties are made from pike conger or lizardfish.

Food scientists have experimented with replacing ingredients in hanpen with other inexpensive fish products and starches, such as African catfish, cassava, and rough flathead, for variations in flavor and nutritional content, and for wider production opportunities.

== Nutrition ==
Hanpen, like many processed fish products, may contain higher levels of MDT (marine-derived tocopherol). Hanpen consumption is linked to somewhat improved liver function in rats. Arsenic levels may be a concern in uki-hanpen.
