= Crab stick =

Type of seafood made of starch and finely pulverized whitefish

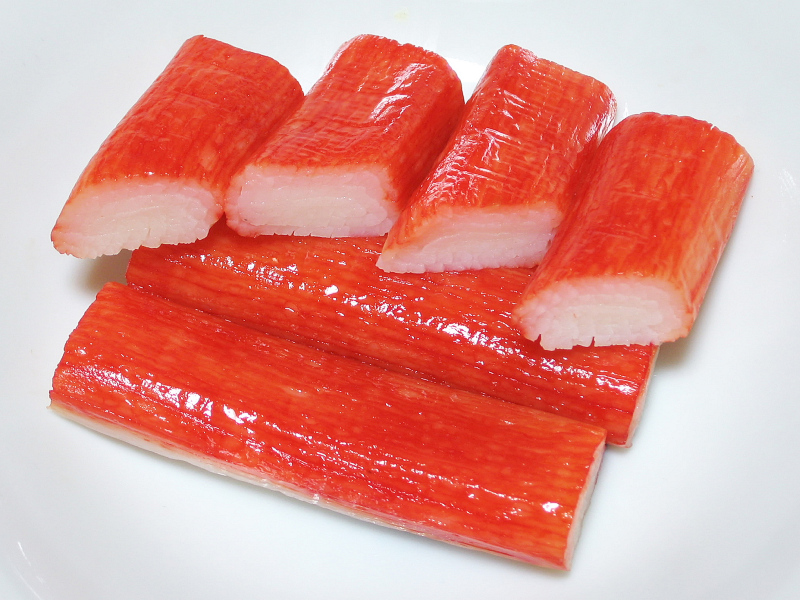
- Crab sticks – imitation crab meat surimi.
- Alternative names: imitation crab meat, seafood sticks, krab
- Place of origin: Japan
- Main ingredients: Whitefish

Crab sticks, krab sticks, snow legs, imitation crab meat, or seafood sticks are a Japanese seafood product made of surimi (pulverized whitefish) and starch, shaped and cured to resemble the leg meat of snow crab or Japanese spider crab. It is a product that uses fish meat to imitate shellfish meat.

In Japanese, it is called kanikama (カニカマ), a portmanteau of kani ("crab") and kamaboko ("fish cake").

== History ==
The Japanese company Sugiyo first produced and patented imitation crab flesh in 1974, as kanikama. This was a flake type. In 1975, the company Osaki Suisan first produced and patented imitation crab sticks.

In 1977, The Berelson Company of San Francisco, California, US, working with Sugiyo, introduced them internationally. Kanikama is still their common name in Japan, but internationally they are marketed under names including Krab Sticks, Ocean Sticks, Sea Legs and Imitation Crab Sticks. Legal restrictions now prevent them from being marketed as "Crab Sticks" in many places, as they usually do not have crab flesh.

== Composition ==
Most crab sticks today are made from Alaska pollock (Gadus chalcogrammus) of the North Pacific Ocean. This main ingredient is often mixed with fillers, such as wheat, and egg white (albumen), or other binding ingredient, such as the enzyme transglutaminase. Crab flavoring is added (natural or more commonly, artificial) and a layer of red food coloring is applied to the outside.

== Uses ==
Crab sticks are used in sushi, salads, fried in tempura, and many other dishes.

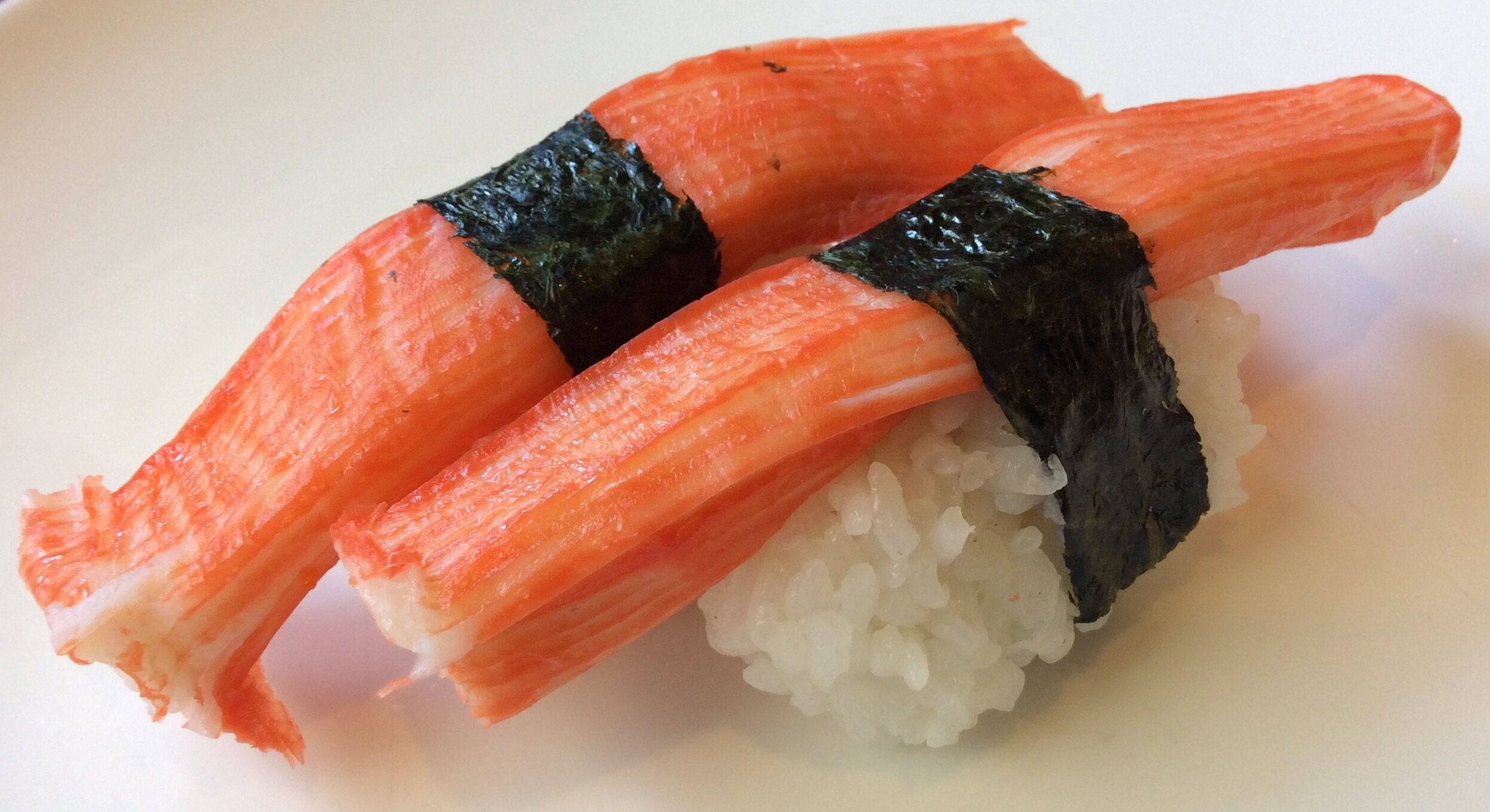
As sushi

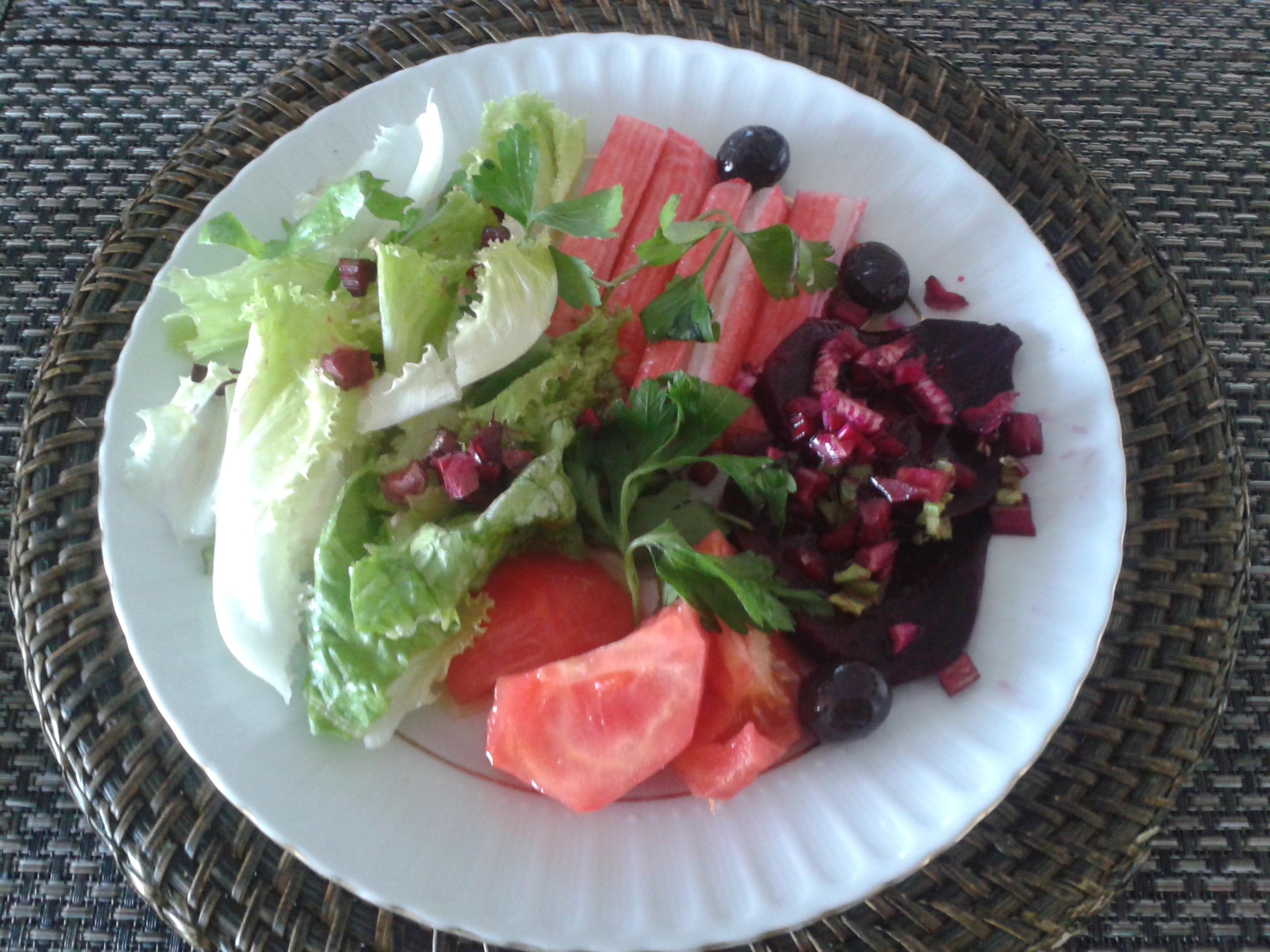
As salad

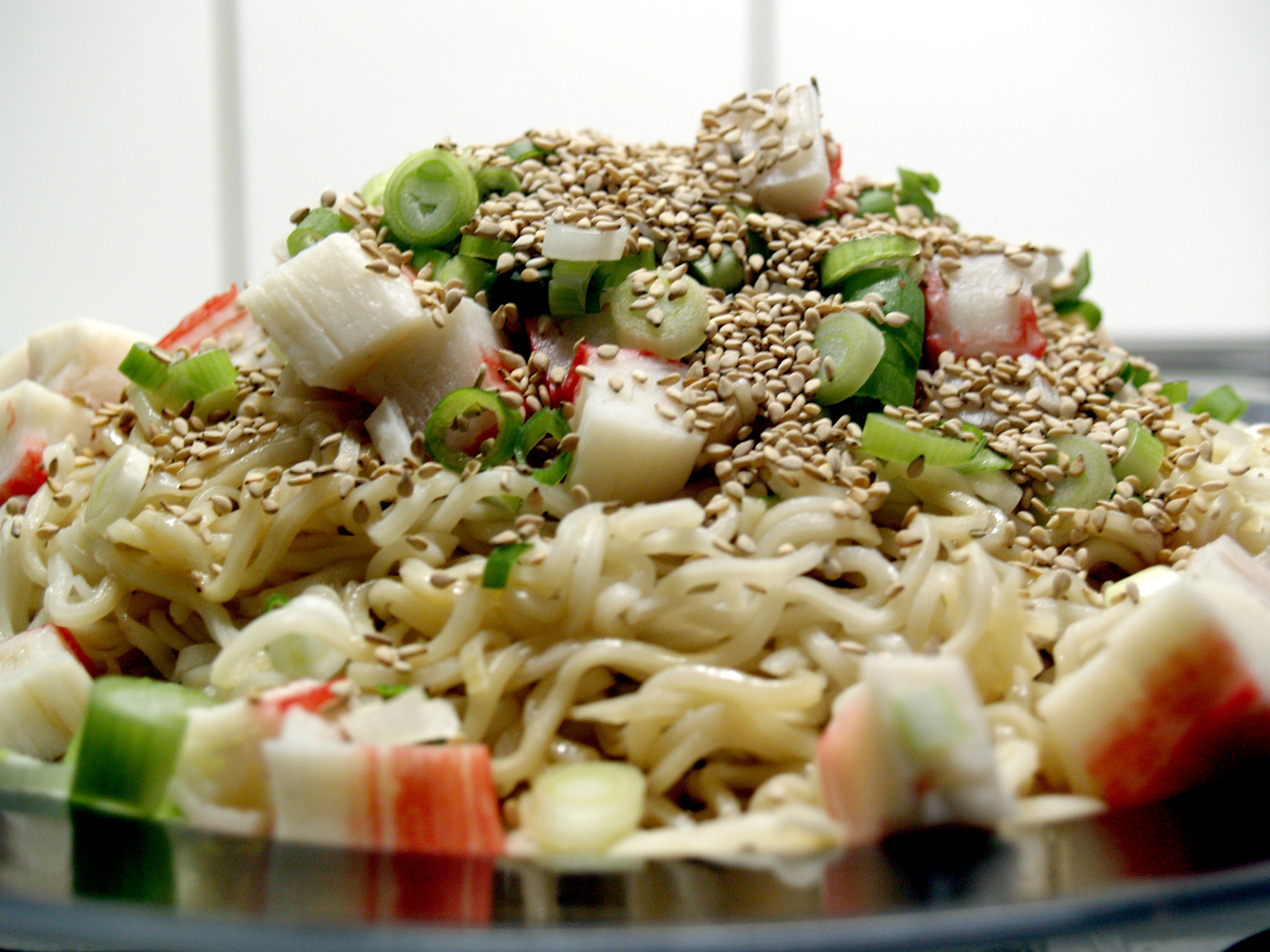
With noodles

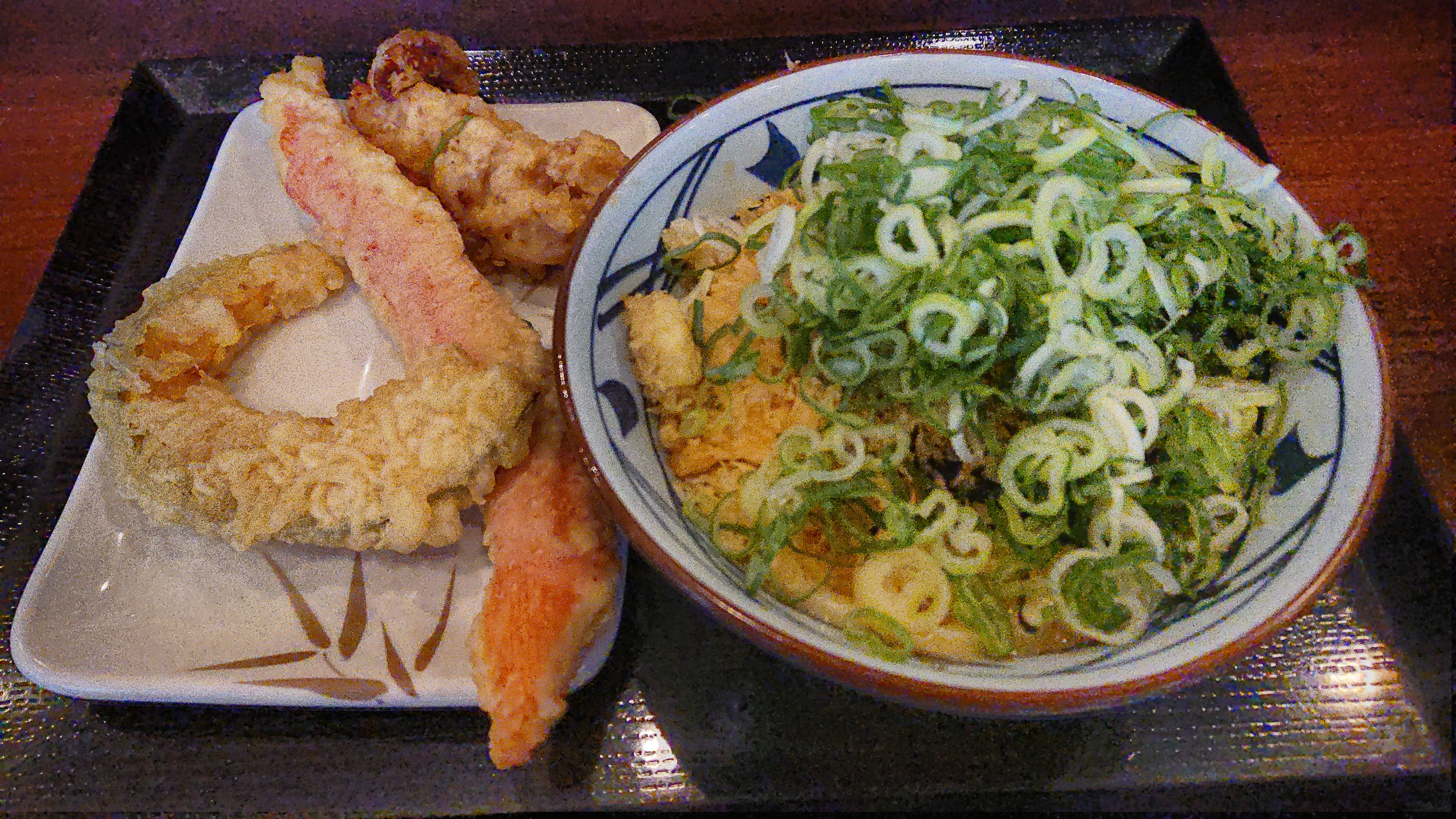
Fried as tempura

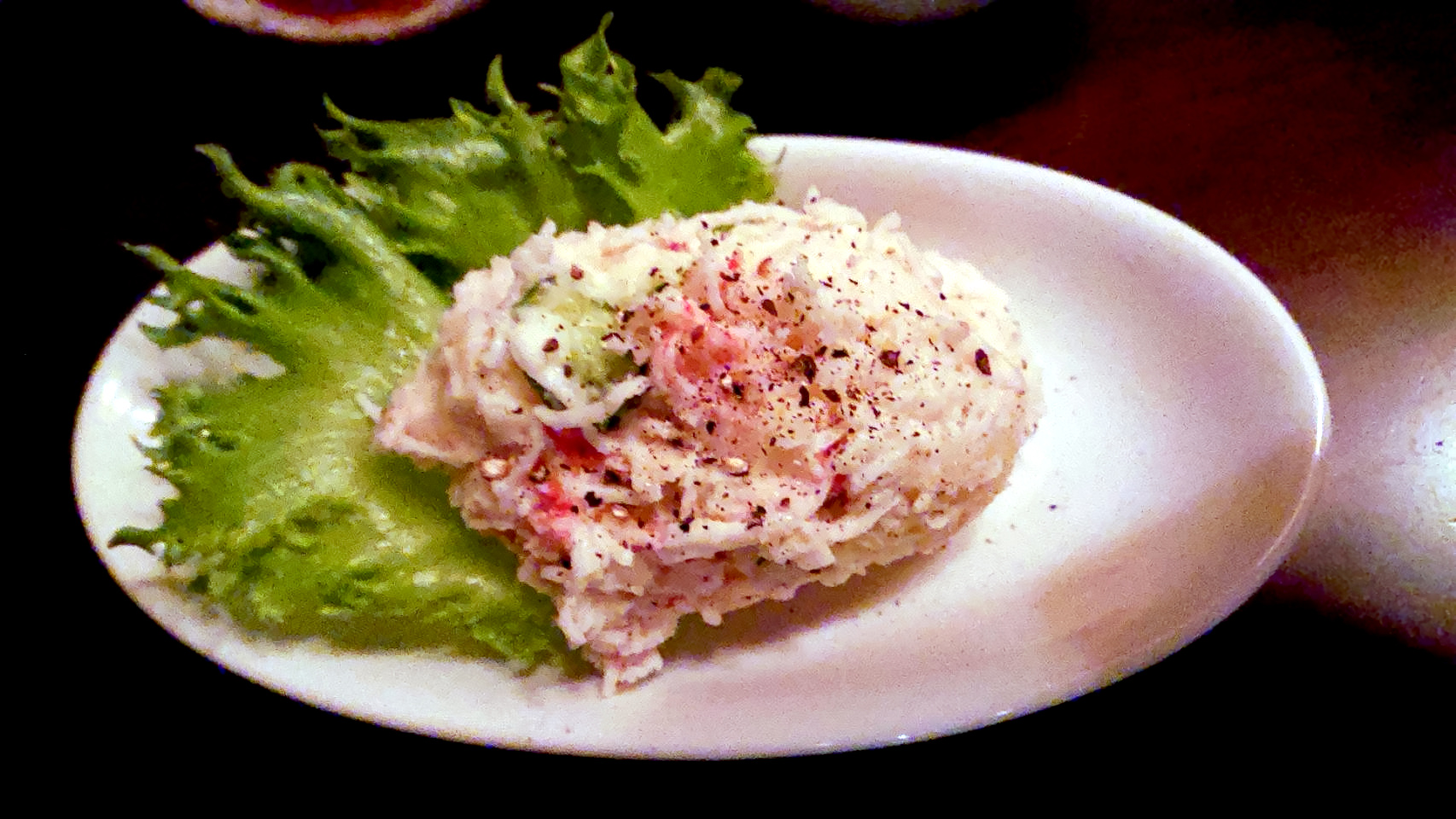
Mixed in potato salad

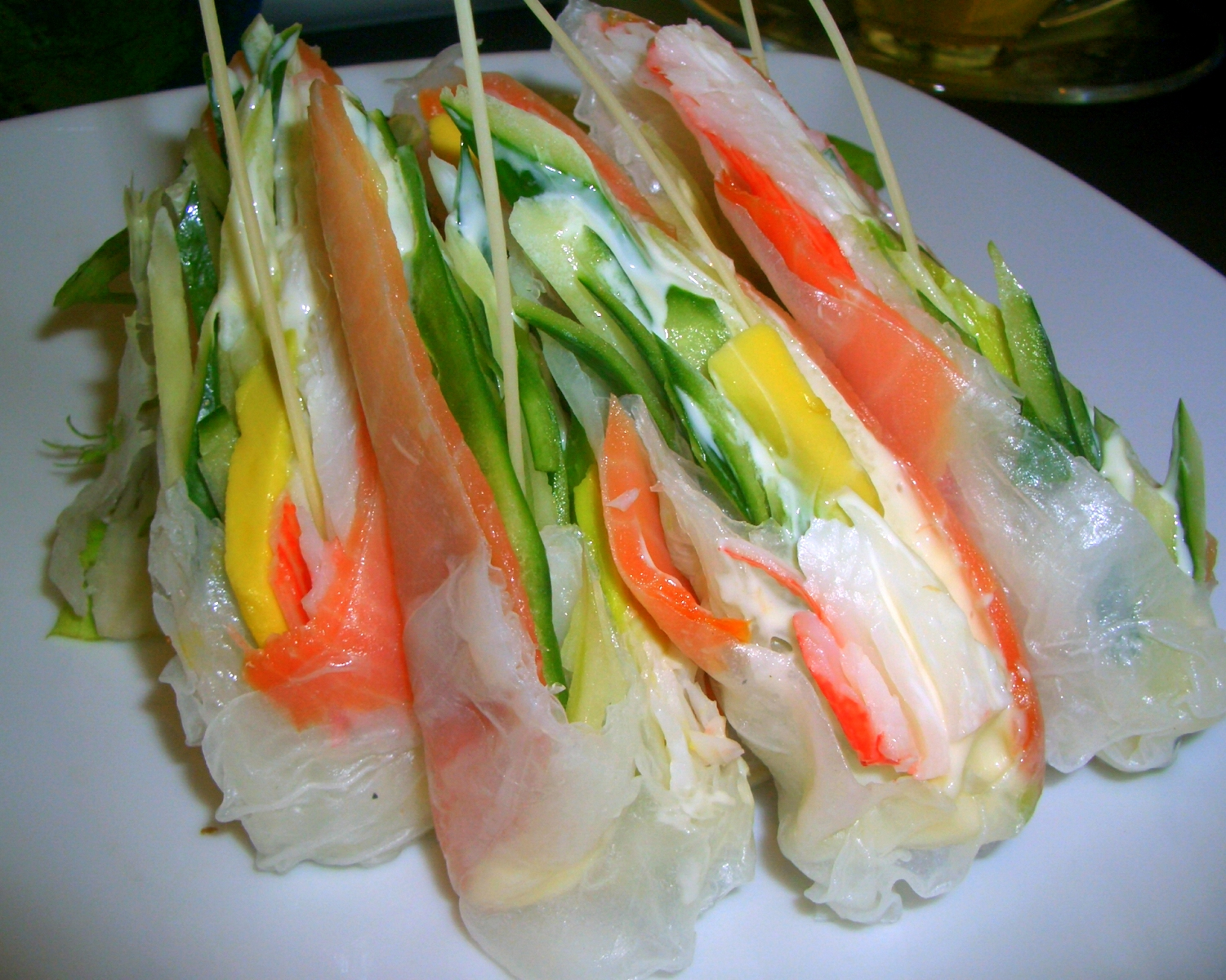
Wrapped in rice paper

== See also ==
- Fish ball
- Kamaboko
- Surimi
