= Jakoten =

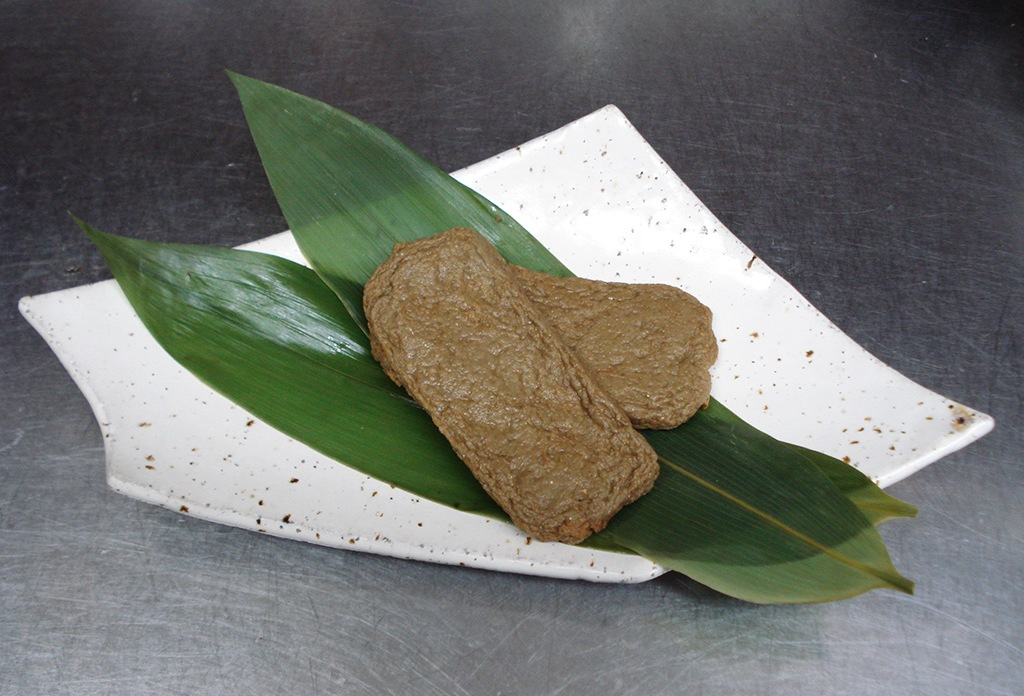
Jakoten at a ryokan in Dogo, Ehime, Japan

Jakoten (じゃこ天) is made from small fish that are blended into a paste and then fried. It is a special product of Uwajima in southern Ehime Prefecture. Jakoten has a long history, having been eaten since the Edo period.

== History ==
According to the Jakoten Book, jakoten was invented in 1614. Originally Date Hidemune made his craftsman make steamed fish pastes in 1615. The craftsmen made steamed pastes of Uwajima fish. Hidemune was a daimyō of Uwajima. He loved steamed fish pastes when he was in Sendai so he wanted to eat them in Ehime.

== Process ==
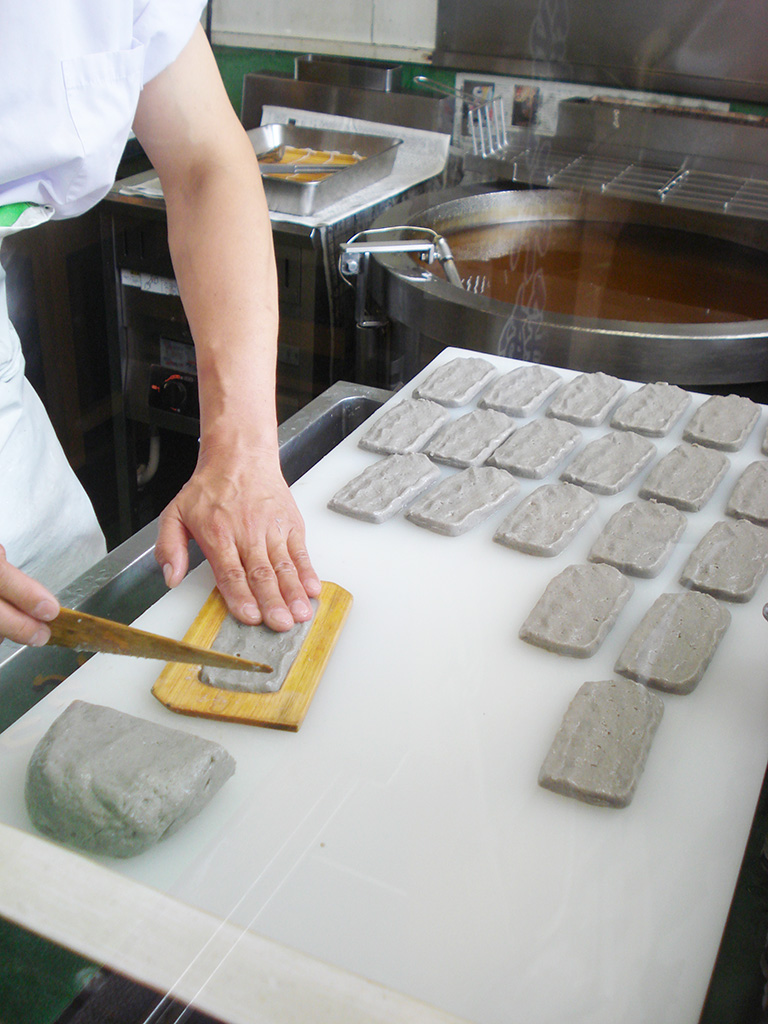

Hotarujako, which are small white fish, are good for making jakoten. Hotarujako is the Japanese name for Acropoma japonicum, a member of the bioluminescent fish family Acropomatidae, called glowbelly or lanternbelly in English. Hotarujako is also called haranbo in Uwajima.

First, the heads, viscera and scales of the fish are removed. Then, the remaining parts are minced including the bones. Seasoning is added and the minced fish is ground into a paste. Next, it is shaped into rectangular patties by using a wood frame. The patties are fried for several minutes until they become brownish. The pieces of jakoten are now ready.

== Eating ==
When jakoten is eaten, it should be broiled using a frying pan or shichirin (portable clay stove). It should be eaten with soy sauce and grated daikon radish. Jakoten is used in nimono, udon, and salad, among other dishes, and goes well with alcoholic drinks.
