= Bokkeum =

Korean stir-fried dishes

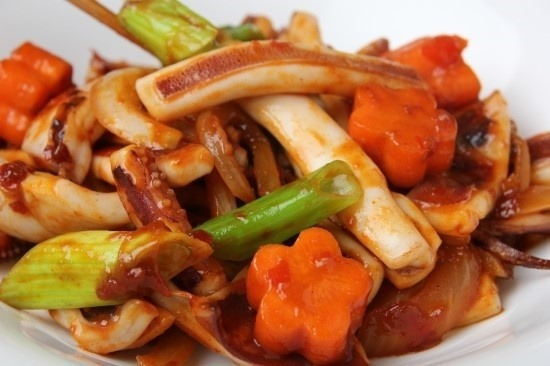
- Ojingeo-bokkeum (stir-fried squid)
- Type: Stir-fry
- Place of origin: Korea
- Associated cuisine: Korean cuisine

Korean name
- Hangul: 볶음
- RR: bokkeum
- MR: pokkŭm
- IPA: po.k͈ɯm

Bokkeum (Korean: 볶음) is a category of stir-fried dishes in Korean cuisine.

== Etymology ==
Bokkeum (볶음) is a verbal noun derived from the Korean verb bokkda (볶다), meaning "to cook food or food ingredients with little or a small amount of liquid by stir-frying over heat".

== Varieties ==
There are dry bokkeum varieties and wet (or moist) bokkeum varieties.

=== Dry ===
- bokkeum-bap (볶음밥) – fried rice
- dak-ttongjip (닭똥집) – stir-fried chicken gizzards
- gamja-chae-bokkeum (감자채볶음) – stir-fried julienned potatoes
- japchae (잡채) – stir-fried glass noodles
- myeolchi-bokkeum (멸치볶음) – stir-fried anchovies
- ojingeo-chae-bokkeum (오징어채볶음) – stir-fried dried shredded squid

=== Wet ===
- dak-galbi (닭갈비) – stir-fried chicken
- jeyuk-bokkeum (제육볶음) – stir-fried pork
- nakji-bokkeum (낙지볶음) – stir-fried long arm octopus
- songi-bokkeum (송이볶음) – stir-fried matsutake
- tteok-bokki (떡볶이) – stir-fried rice cakes
- kimchi-bokkeum (김치볶음) – stir-fried kimchi
- odolppyeo-bokkeum – stir-fried pork cartilage

== Gallery ==
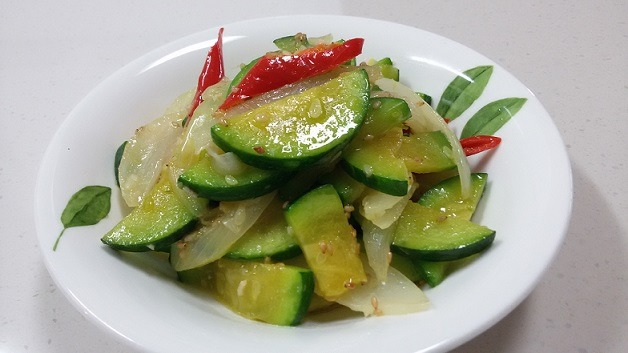
Aehobak-bokkeum (stir-fried Korean zucchini)

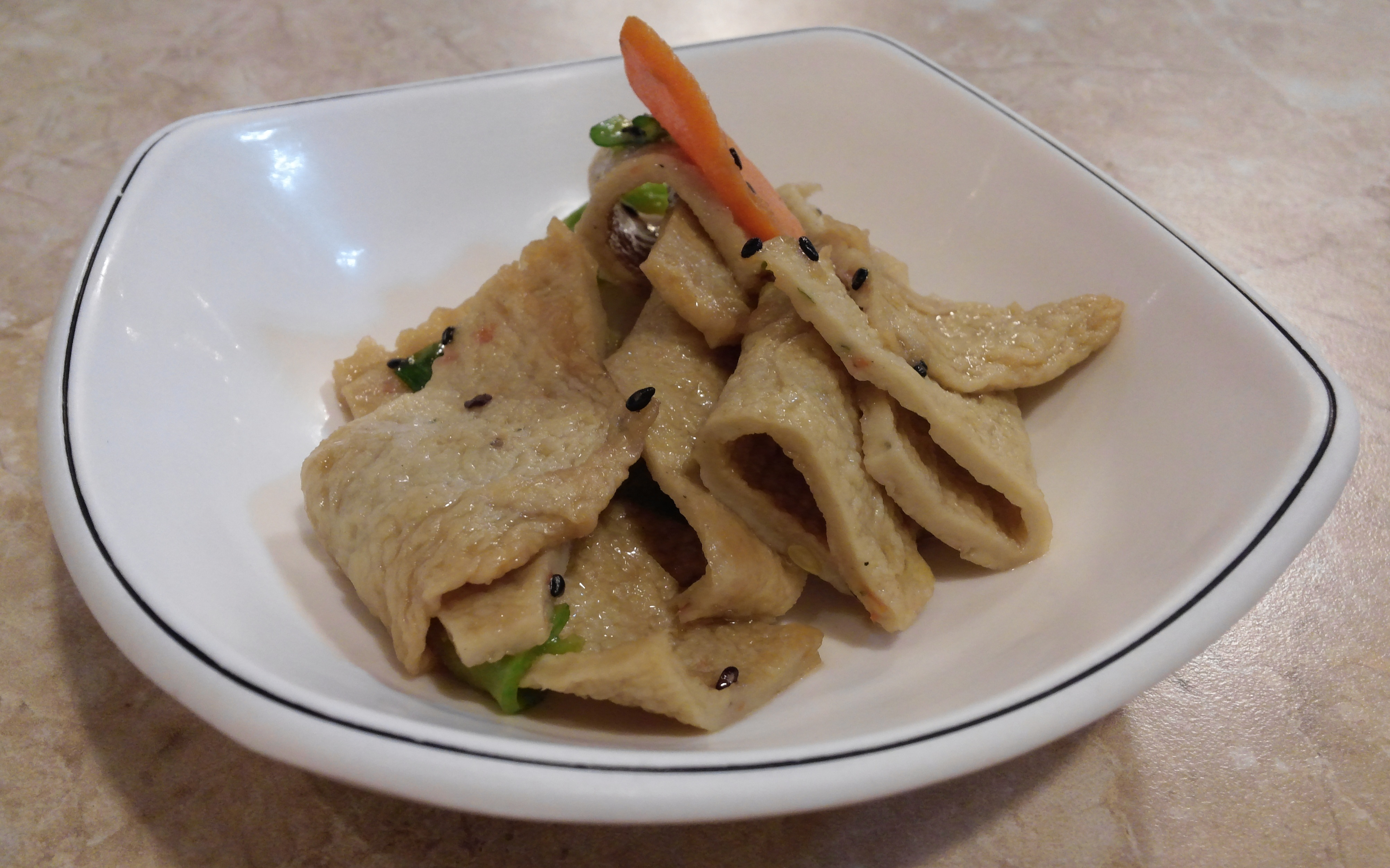
Eomuk-bokkeum (stir-fried fishcakes)

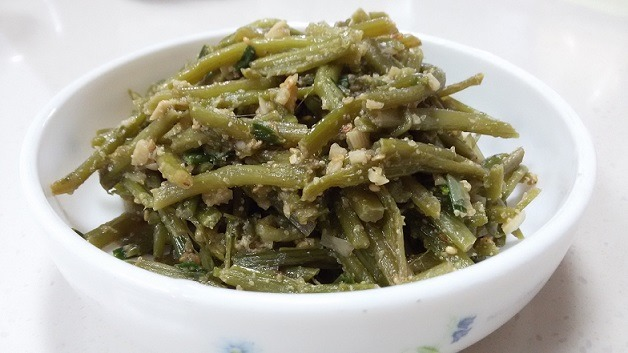
Goguma-julgi-bokkeum (stir-fried sweet potato stems)

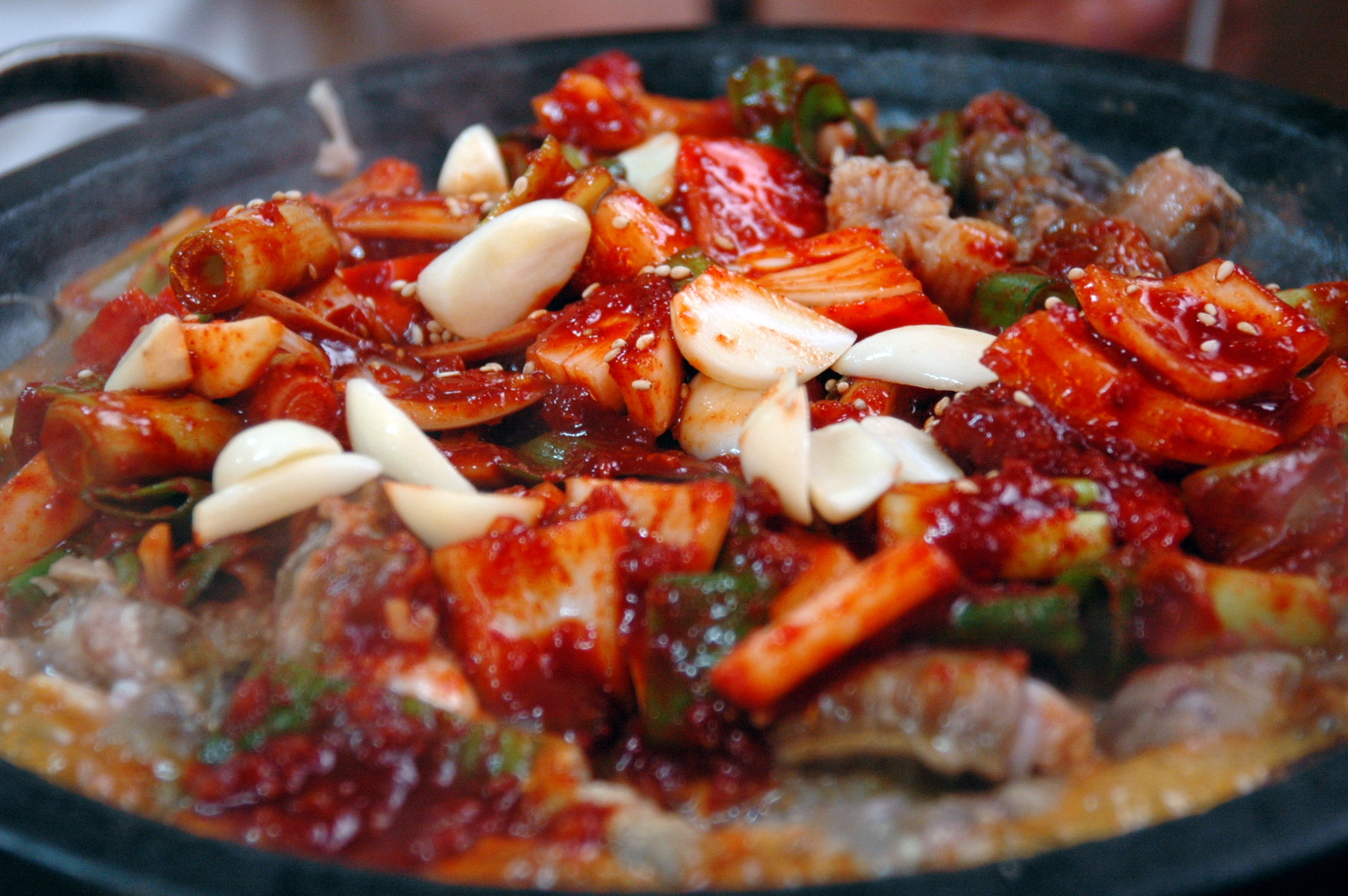
Gomjangeo-bokkeum (stir-fried hagfish)

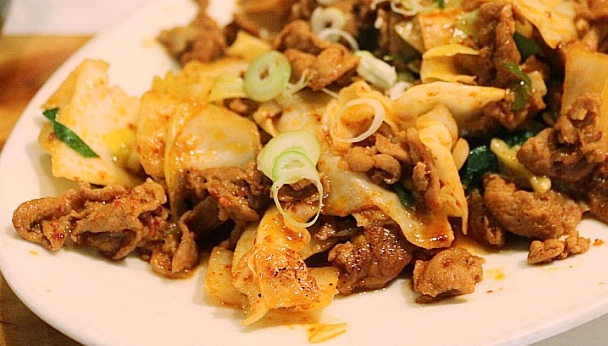
Jeyuk-bokkeum (stir-fried pork)

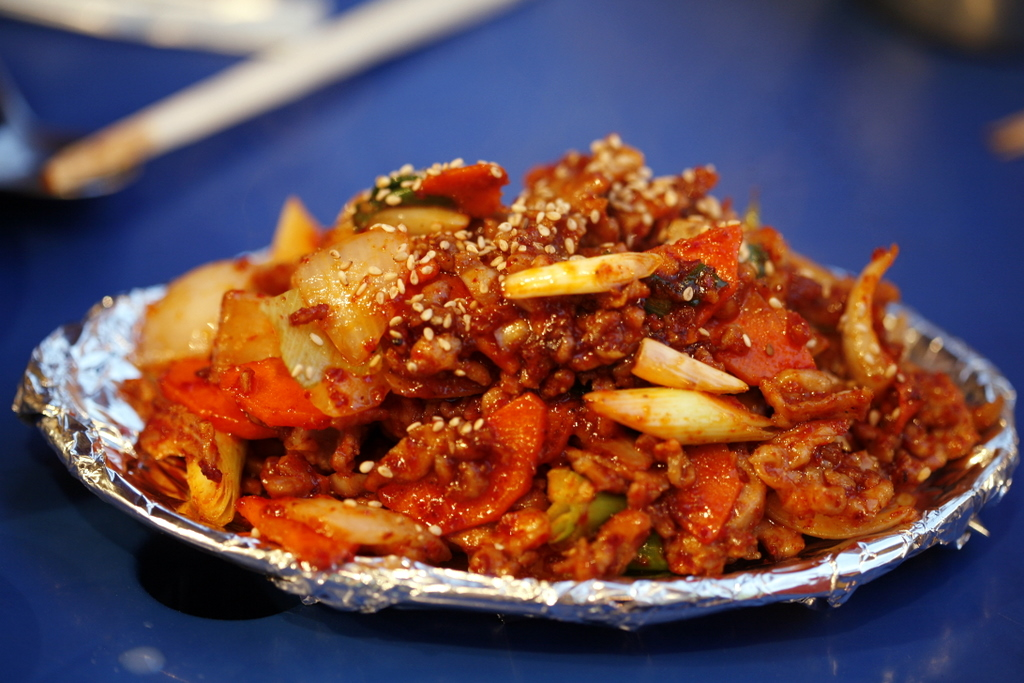
Odolppyeo-bokkeum (stir-fried pork cartilage)

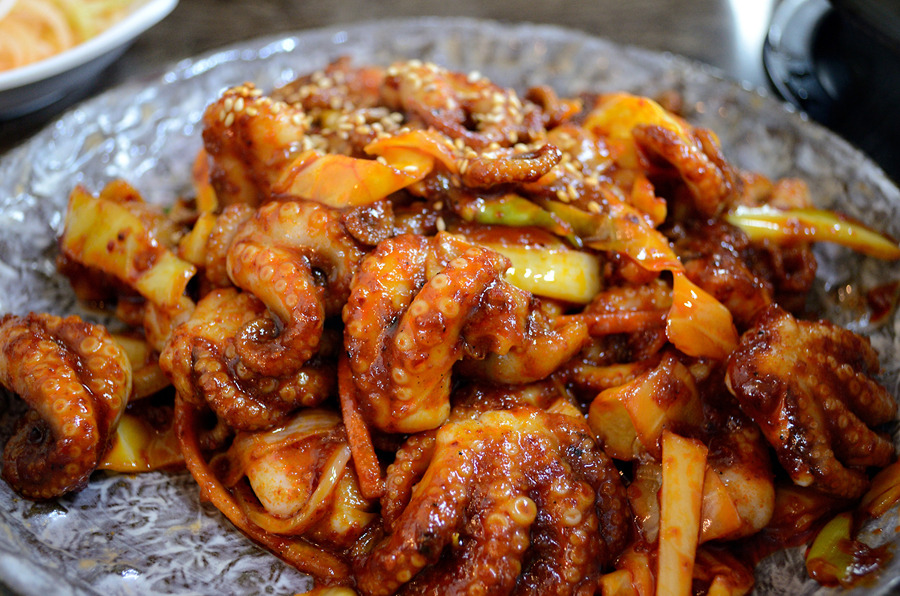
Jukkumi-bokkeum (stir-fried webfoot octopus)

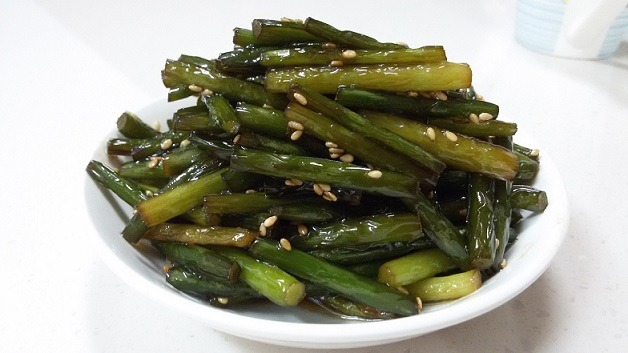
Maneul-jong-bokkeum (stir-fried garlic scapes)

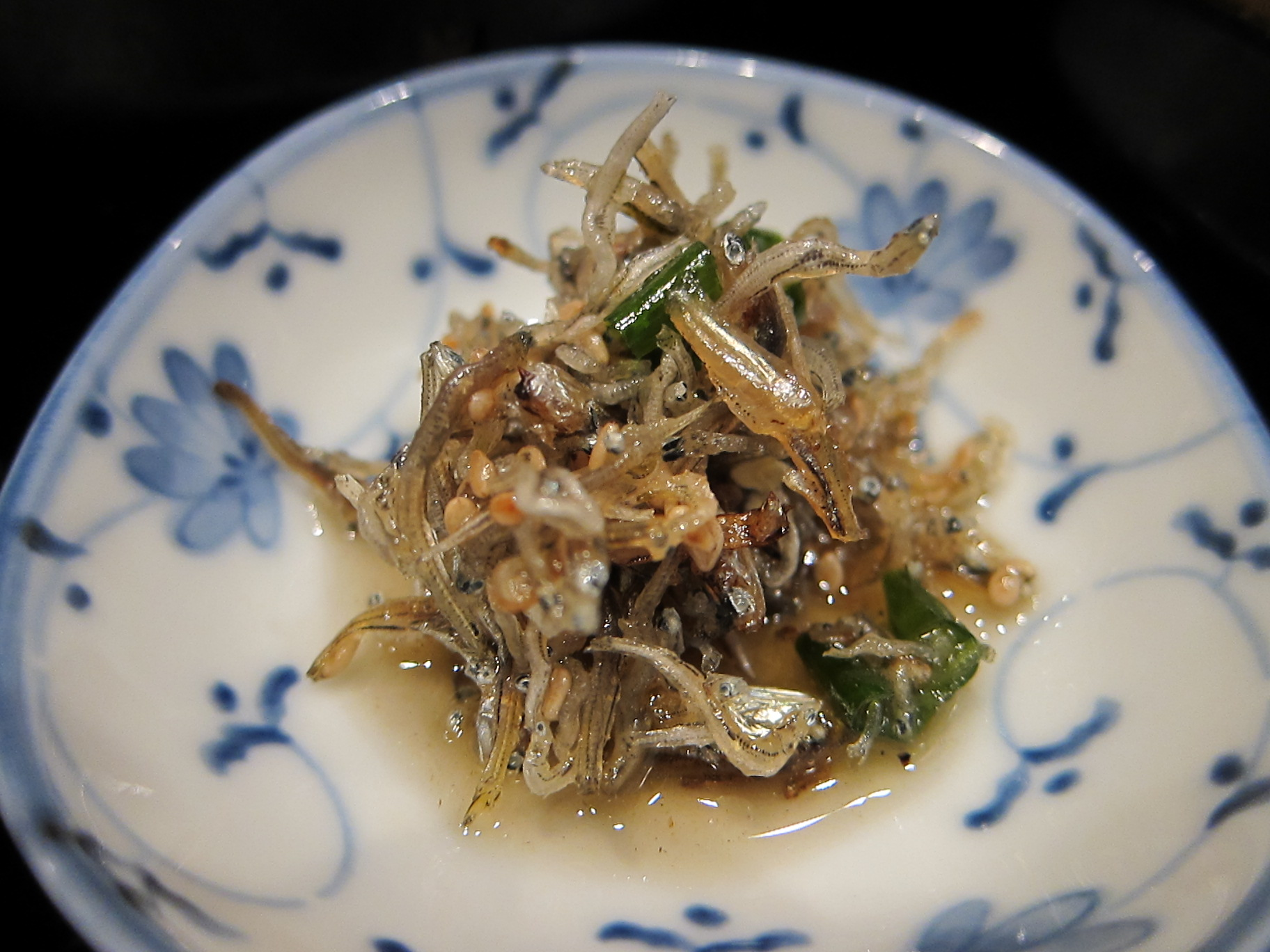
Myeolchi-bokkeum (stir-fried anchovies)

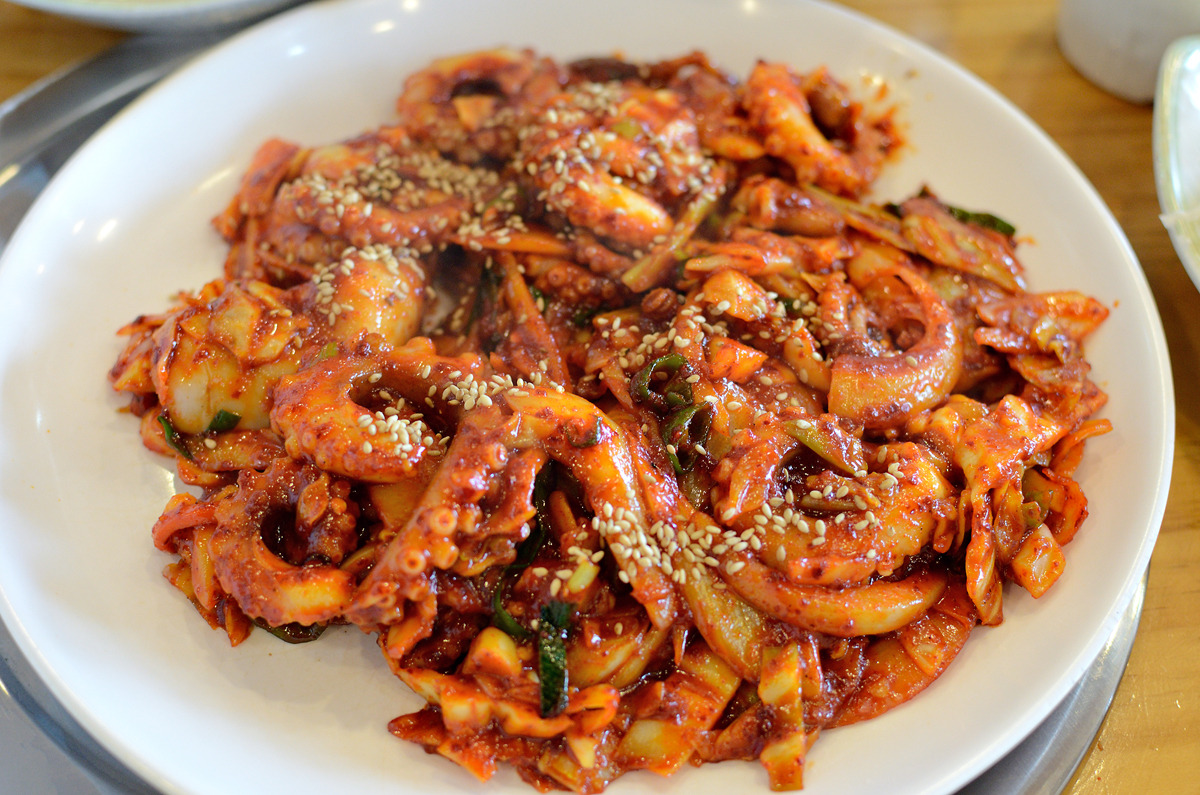
Nakji-bokkeum (stir-fried long arm octopus)

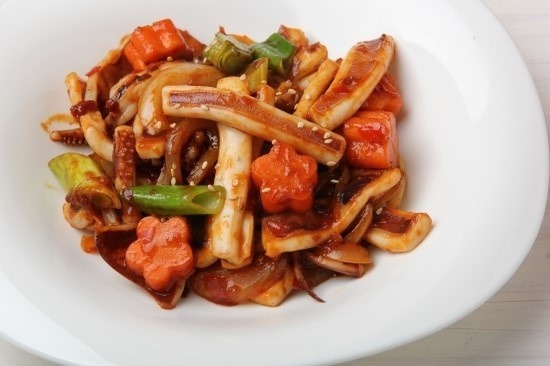
Ojingeo-bokkeum (stir-fried squid)

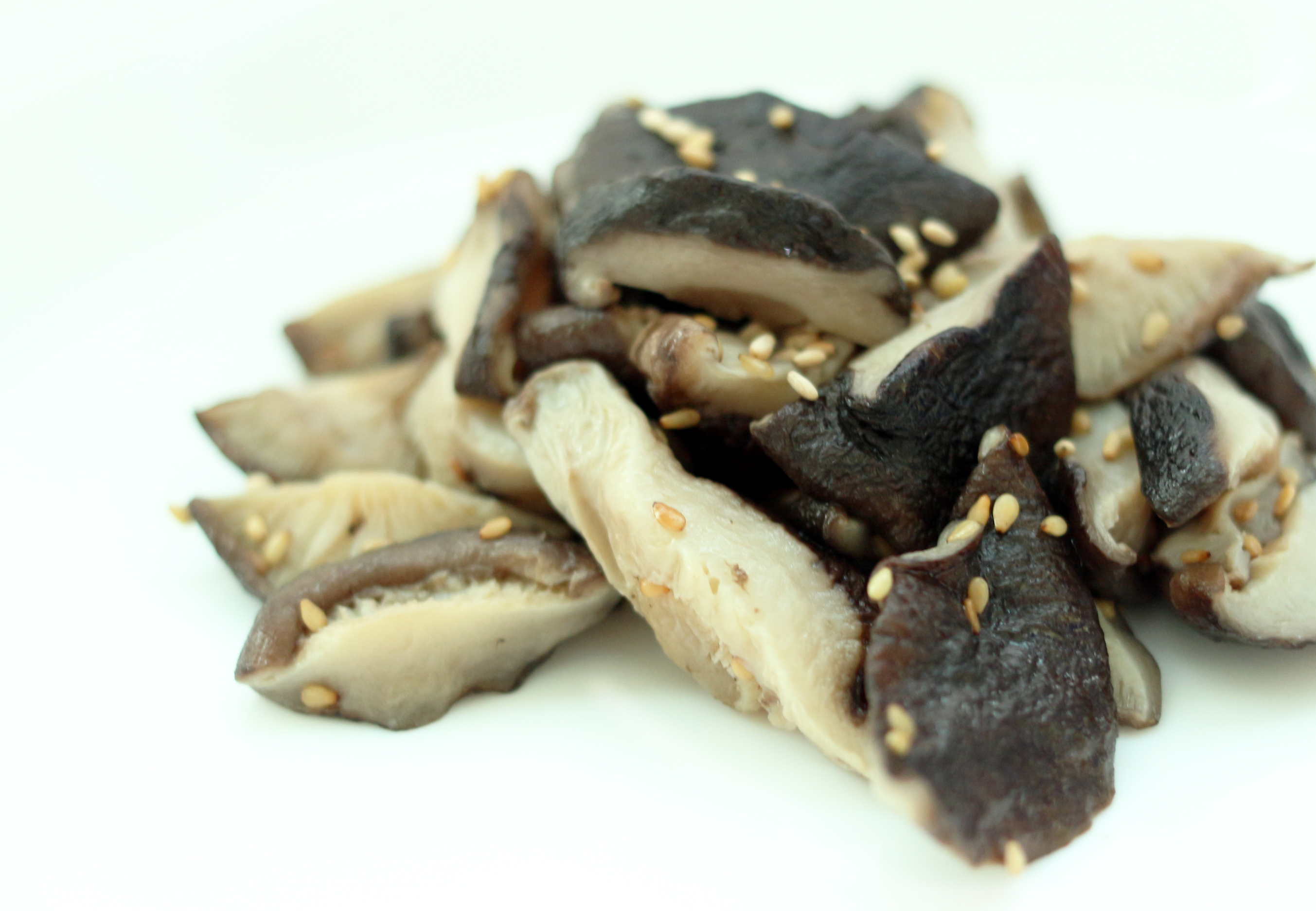
Pyogo-bokkeum (stir-fried shiitake)

== See also ==
- Banchan
