= Ventriculus =

Ventriculus can refer to:

- Ventricle (heart)
- Stomach
- the midgut in insects
- the gizzard in birds
