= Mazalika =

Egyptian dish made of chicken liver and gizzard

- Type: Meat
- Course: Main course
- Place of origin: Egypt
- Serving temperature: Hot
- Main ingredients: Chicken liver, chicken gizzard, garlic, onion, tomato sauce, ghee, cumin, coriander, green chili
- Food energy (per 300-g serving): 954 kcal (3,990 kJ)
Nutritional value
(per 300-g serving)
- Protein: 33 g
- Fat: 11 g
- Carbohydrate: 181 g

Mazalika (Egyptian Arabic: مزاليكا) is an Egyptian dish made of chicken liver and gizzard.
