= Dak-ttongjip =

Korean stir-fried chicken gizzard dish

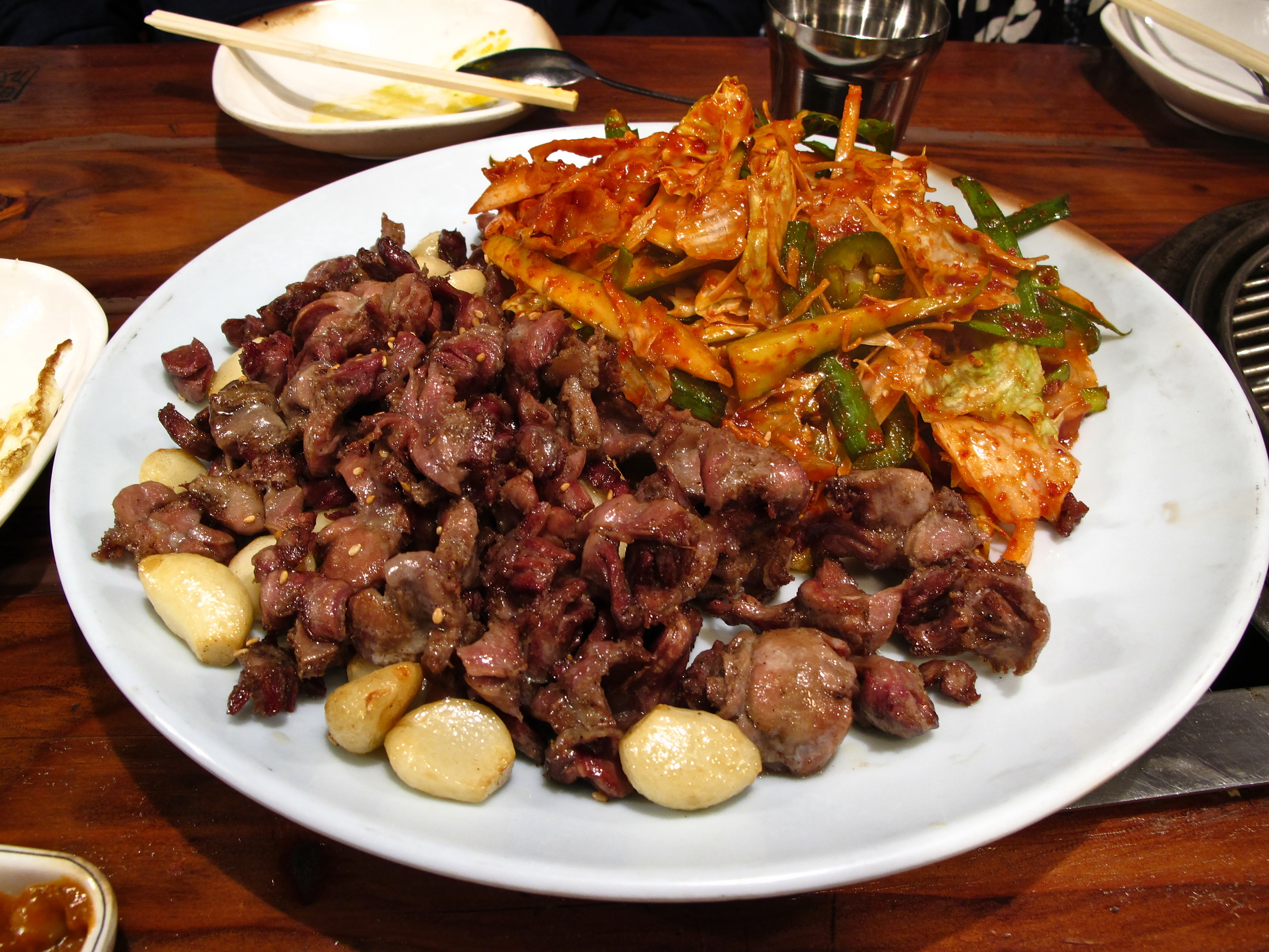
- Alternative names: Dak-ttongjip-bokkeum
- Place of origin: South Korea
- Region or state: Daegu
- Associated cuisine: South Korean cuisine
- Invented: 1972
- Serving temperature: Warm
- Main ingredients: Chicken gizzards

Korean name
- Hangul: 닭똥집
- Lit.: chicken gizzard
- RR: dakttongjip
- MR: takttongchip
- IPA: tak̚.t͈oŋ.t͈ɕip̚

Dak-ttongjip (닭똥집), literally "chicken gizzard", is a Korean dish made by stir-frying chicken gizzard with spices. It is a popular anju (accompaniment to alcoholic drinks). The dish can also be called dak-ttongjip-bokkeum (닭똥집볶음), as it is a bokkeum (stir-fried dish).

== Etymology and translations ==
Dak-ttongjip (닭똥집) is a vernacular term for "chicken gizzard", with its components dak (닭) meaning "chicken", and ttongjip (똥집) normally meaning "big intestine" or "stomach". However, as ttong and jip can be (mistakenly) parsed as "waste" and "house" respectively, mistranslations such as "chicken poo house" or "chicken asshole house" are not uncommon.

== History ==
In 1972, dak-ttongjip was a giveaway side dish for day laborers visiting Sama Tongdak, a fried chicken restaurant at Pyeonghwa Market in Daegu. Due to its positive reception, it became a regular menu item. Soon, it became the most popular food at Pyeonghwa Market, where there is a "dak-ttongjip alley" today. Dak-ttongjip is now considered the local specialty of Daegu.
