= Fishcake =

Fried minced or ground seafood

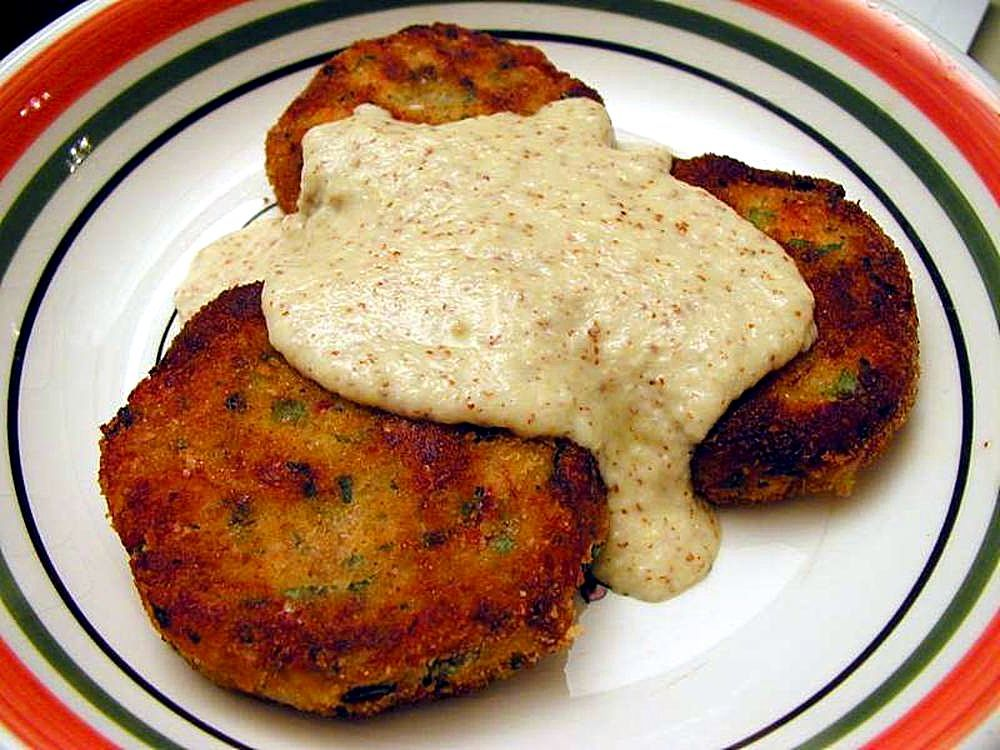
- Fishcake
- Course: As a snack, appetizer, or in soups
- Place of origin: International
- Main ingredients: Fish, surimi, potato, breadcrumbs, egg

A fishcake (sometimes written as fish cake) is a culinary dish consisting of filleted fish or other seafood minced or ground, mixed with a starchy ingredient, and fried until golden. They can also frequently be oven-baked.

Asian-style fishcakes usually contain fish with salt, water, starch, and egg. They can include a combination of fish paste and surimi. European-style fishcakes are similar to a croquette, consisting of filleted fish or other seafood with potato patty, sometimes coated in breadcrumbs or batter. Fishcakes as defined in The Oxford Dictionary of Food and Nutrition are chopped or minced fish mixed with potato, egg and flour with seasonings of onions, peppers and sometimes herbs.

The fishcake has been seen as a way of using up leftover food that might otherwise be thrown away. In Mrs Beeton's 19th-century publication Book of Household Management, her recipe for fishcakes calls for "leftover fish" and "cold potatoes". More modern recipes have added to the dish, suggesting such ingredients as smoked salmon and vegetables.

== Composition ==
As fish has traditionally been a major dietary component of people living near seas, rivers, and lakes, many regional variations of the fish cake have arisen. Commonly, fishcakes used cod as a filling; however, as cod stocks have been depleted, other varieties of white fish are now used, such as haddock or whiting. Fishcakes may also use oily fish, such as salmon, for a markedly different flavour.

Fishcakes have also traditionally been made from salted fish (most commonly cod, haddock, or pollock). Fishcakes are also prepared without breadcrumbs or batter, and are made with a mixture of cooked fish, potatoes, and occasionally eggs formed into patties and then fried.

Variations can depend on what type of fish is used; how finely chopped the fish is; the use of milk or water; the use of flour or boiled potatoes; the use of eggs, egg whites, or no eggs; the cooking method (boiling, frying, or baking); and the inclusion of other ingredients (for example, shrimp, bacon, herbs, or spices).

Fish cakes are cooked in different ways based on the cuisine. In North America it is common practice to pan-fry the fish cakes, which are often served as appetizers, whereas in Asia they are often served boiled in soups or as an accompaniment to noodles. Some common dishes in Asian countries that include fish cakes are udon, fish cake soup, fish ball noodles, or they can just be served individually as a side dish.

== Nutrition ==
The nutrients in fish cakes are mainly contributed by freshwater fish, the main ingredient in fish cakes. Asian-style fish cakes are usually high in protein, calcium, and low in fat. For example, per 100g of Japanese fish cakes (kamaboko) has approximately 113.6 Calories, in which 12.3g are carbohydrates (4%) (including dietary fiber of 0.12g), 13.2g protein (26%), 0.67g fat (1%) (composed of 0.092g saturated fat, 0.33g polyunsaturated fat and 0.078g monounsaturated fat), 48.0 mg cholesterol (16%), 845.5 mg sodium (35%), and 241.1 mg potassium (7%).

As for Western fish cakes or fish patties, there is no significant difference in the nutritional aspects from their Asian counterparts. However, the Western fish cakes are relatively higher in fat content. Western fish cakes or patties have approximately 201 Calories per 100g, contributed by 12.38g carbohydrate (4%) (including 1.1g dietary fiber and 1.03g sugar), 13.65g protein, 10.49g fat (16%*) (including saturated fat 2.245g, polyunsaturated fat 3.085g and monounsaturated fat 4.418g), 55 mg cholesterol (22%), 279 mg sodium (14%), and 463 mg potassium. The percentage daily values above are based on a 2000-calorie diet so may vary depending on the caloric needs of the consumer.

== Manufacturing ==
In Singaporean fishcake production, fish meats are first defrosted and then ground. After the grinding process, fish meats and all ingredients needed are blended at high speed. Salt, sugar, flour, and starch are added to mashed fish fillets. It is good to add salt which approximately weighs 3% of the fish fillets' weight. Also, other ingredients such as vegetables (onions, carrots, or green onions) or chemicals such as MSG can be added for a better flavor only if the ingredients are suitable for the local requirement. Next, the fish paste is formed so that it can be baked or deep-fried. In order to properly preserve fishcake product, during the process of baking or frying, eradication of enzymes and microorganisms is necessary using heat. For instance, Canada has a specific regulation that the fish cakes should be heated to 65 °C (149 °F) for one minute to destroy any salmonella that may be present. After fishcakes are finally filtered, they are sent for packing and are now ready to deliver.

=== Distribution and storage ===
Fishcakes are also often sold in fish markets in individual pieces. To keep the fish cakes fresh, they are often sold in bags full of water. These fish cakes are not fried and usually used in soups.

The shelf life for fish cakes varies greatly, depending on the manufacturing and storage process, from 12 to 90 days.

== Africa ==
=== Saint Helena ===
In Saint Helena, fishcakes are made from locally caught tuna or wahoo scraped into mashed potato with herbs and spices, then moulded into cakes and fried in oil. They are often spicy or, as locals would describe, "with bite".

== Americas ==
=== Brazil ===
In Brazil, fishcakes are typically made from a mixture of potatoes, codfish, eggs, parsley, onion and sometimes a hint of nutmeg. They are also commonly referred to as "salt cod fritters" or "salt cod croquettes". They are shaped using two spoons, deep-fried, and served hot or cold before meals as an appetizer or as a meal itself (usually served with plain or seasoned rice, salad and olives). Ideally, they should be slightly crunchy on the outside and soft and creamy on the inside. They are known in Portuguese as bolinhos de bacalhau.

=== Canada ===
In Newfoundland and Labrador, the fish is generally salted cod flakes and is blended with mashed potatoes. Savory is used instead of parsley, along with minced sweated onions. The cakes are then formed into rounds and cooked in oil or pork back fat until golden brown.

=== Caribbean ===
In Barbados, fishcakes are made from salted codfish, herbs, onions, a variety of seasonings and flour batter, then fried in oil. In Bermuda, they are known as Bermuda fishcakes and are made especially during Easter, but also throughout the year. Here fishcakes are normally eaten between hot cross buns. In Puerto Rico and the Dominican Republic, bacalaítos are eaten either as a snack or as part of a meal.

=== United States ===
In the United States, fishcakes are made by combining canned salmon, egg, and varying amounts of crushed crackers, bread crumbs, or flour; Jewish versions of the recipe may use matzah meal. Diced onions and sometimes bell pepper are added to the mixture. Typical seasonings include salt, black pepper, and Worcestershire sauce. Variations may use dill or citrus, or involve adding a coating or corn starch. The fishcake mixture is then formed into round disks and is typically pan-fried in some sort of fat. They can be eaten with white rice or with tartar sauce. Many people eat them as a main course. They are known as salmon patties or salmon croquettes. There are some who believe that the original recipe was created during the Great Depression to end pellagra in the Southern US.

== Asia ==
=== Cambodia ===
In Cambodia, fishcakes are called prohet trei kroeung (ប្រហិតត្រីគ្រឿង, prohet trei krœăng). They are made from whitefish fillets mixed with yellow kroeung and pounded in a mortar and pestle. The mix is shaped into patties or meatballs and deep-fried. They are eaten with a sauce made out of Kampot pepper mixed with lime juice and salt.

=== China ===
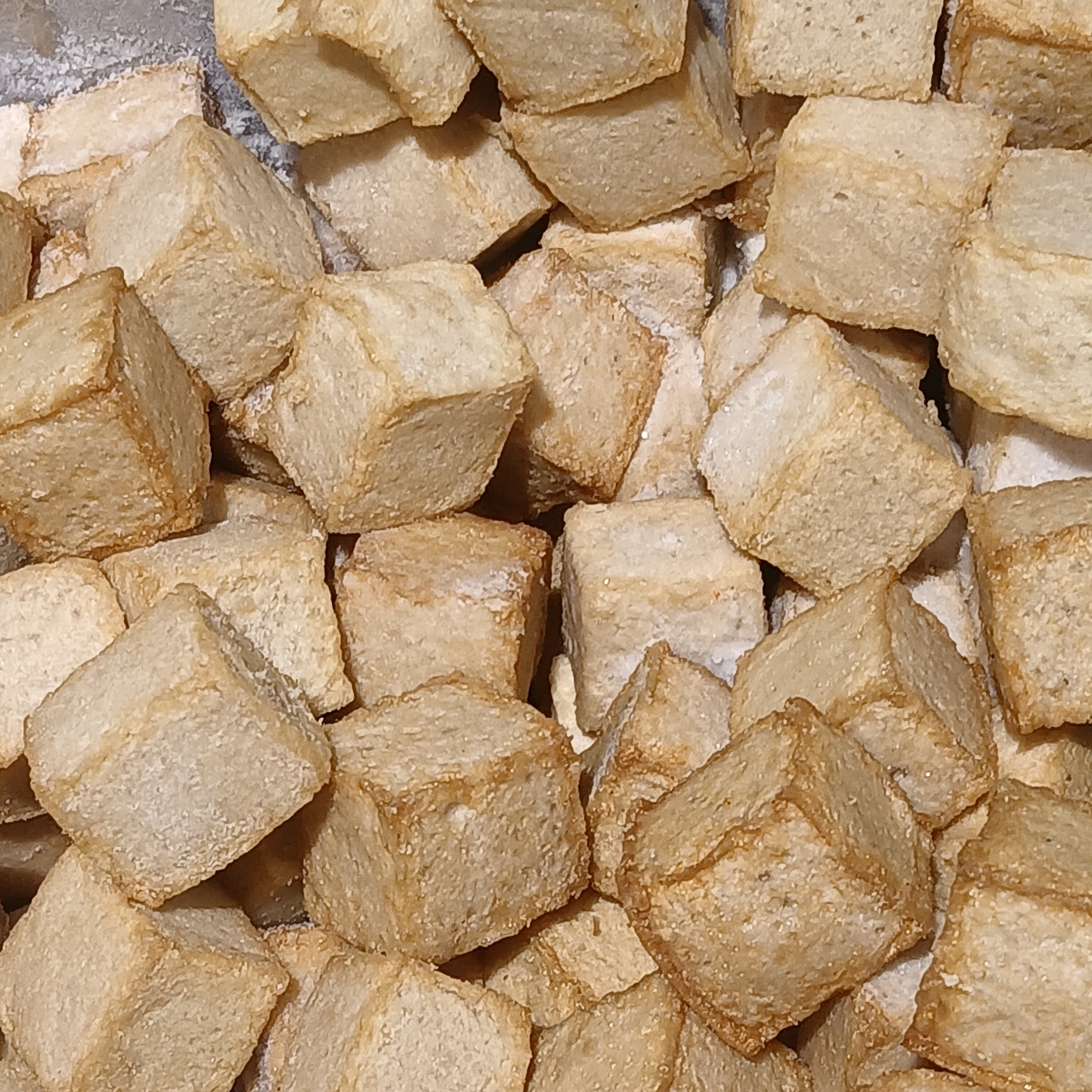
Fish tofu

In the Qing dynasty, there are two recipe books recording how to make square fishcakes with fish, fatty pork and eggs. Fish tofu is made of ground fish, and molded into chunks resembling tofu.

=== India ===
In West Bengal, several local fish species (mostly riverine) are prepared and eaten in deep-fried breadcrumb covered fishcakes, locally called maacher chop. The item is very popular as an appetizer during middle-class Bengali festivities.

=== Indonesia ===
Indonesian varieties of fishcakes are locally known in Southern Sumatra as pempek or empek-empek. The traditional Southern Sumatran pempek is served with kuah cuka ("vinegar sauce"). These fishcakes are usually round or tube-shaped. Another variation of fishcake from Indonesia is otak-otak. It is believed that otak-otak is a fusion of Palembangese and Peranakan. The fishcake is wrapped in a banana leaf and then grilled over a charcoal grill. It is served with peanut sauce that is mildly spicy.

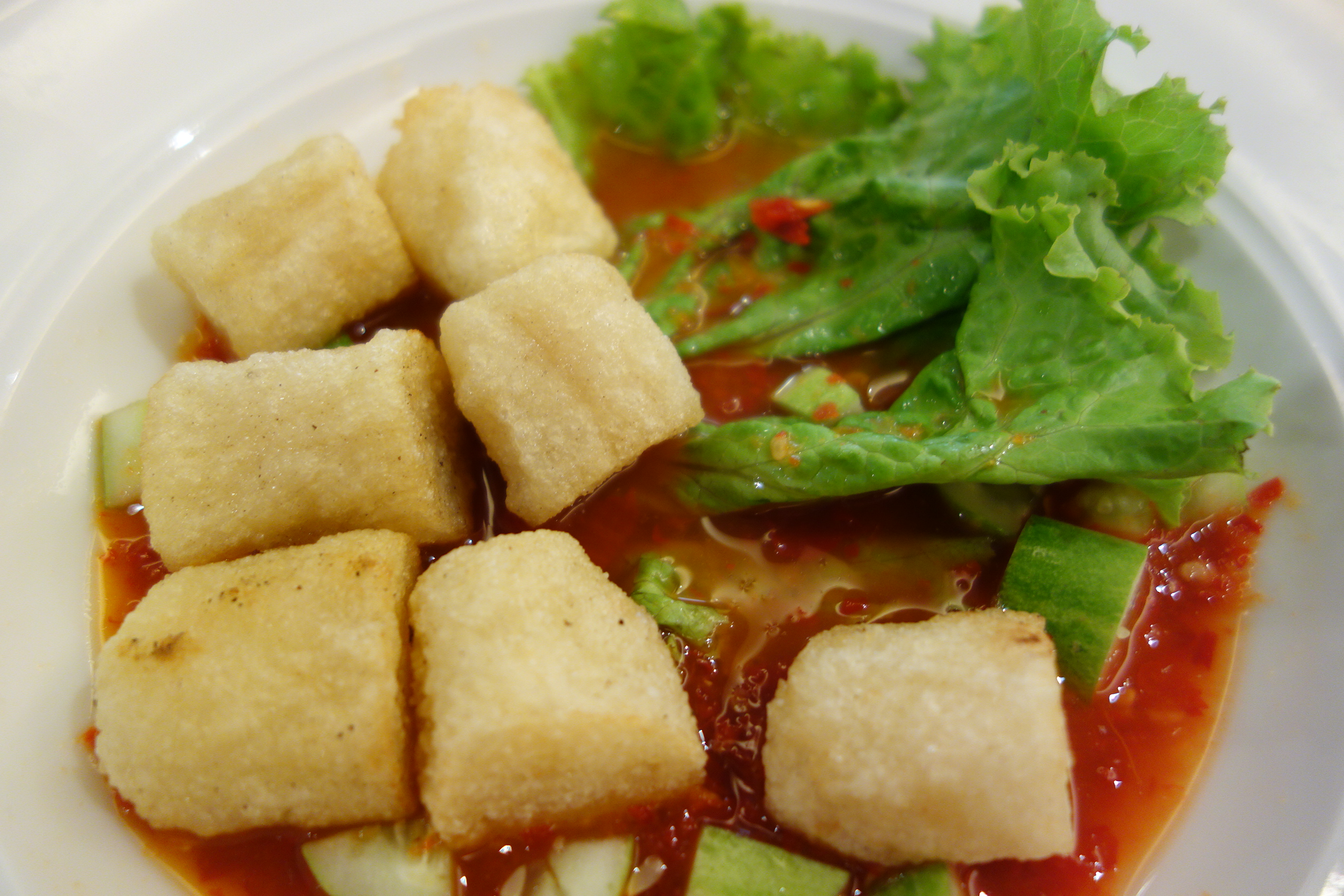
Pempek bangka

=== Israel ===
In Jewish cuisine, gefilte fish are patties of white fish mixed with matzoh or challah, poached in the skin of the fish.

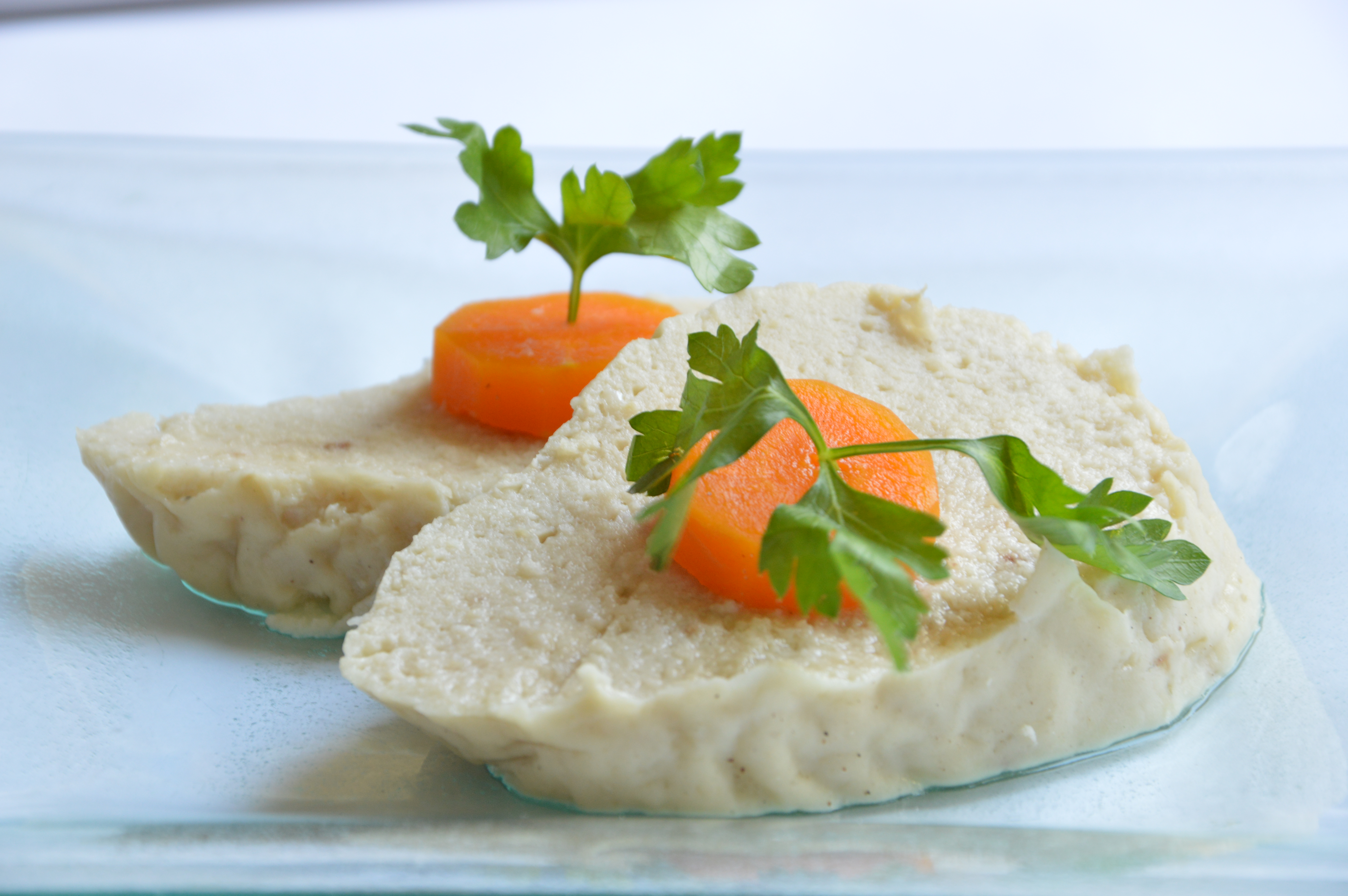
Gefilte fish

=== Japan ===
In Japan, white fish is puréed and steamed into a loaf called kamaboko. Fried fishcakes, such as satsuma-age and various fried kamaboko, to which onions, burdock, minced squid and shrimp are added, are also popular.

Fishcakes in Japan are commonly made from surimi, a paste made primarily from fish meat and mirin, starch, egg whites and spices. After formation, they are commonly fried or boiled before packing and distribution. Based on the Japanese food regulations, fish cakes made from fish paste should be sterilized for 45 minutes at 80 °C, measured in the centre. After sterilization, the fish paste should also be stored below 10 °C with frozen fish pastes requiring a minimum storage temperature below -15 °C.

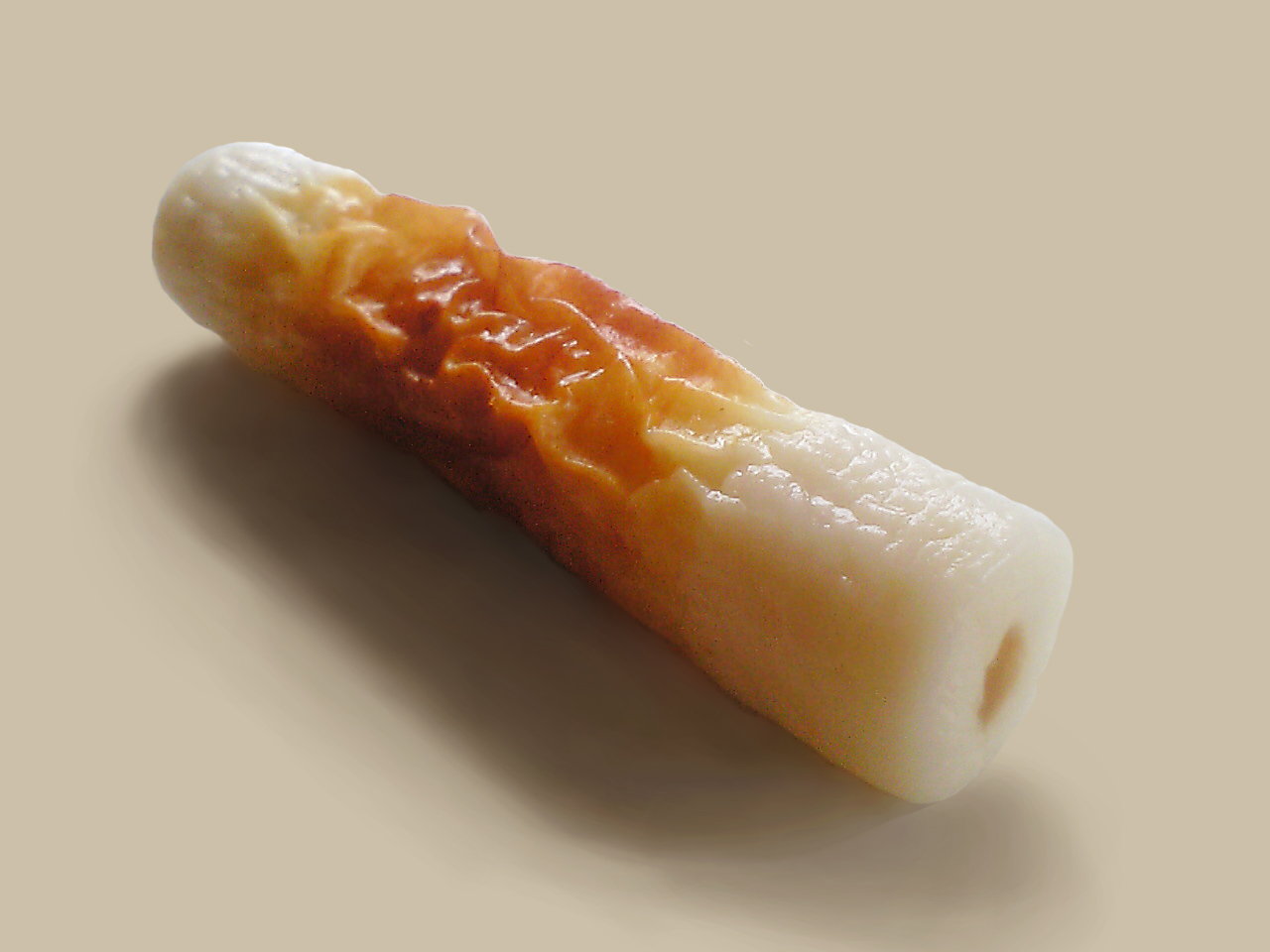
Chikuwa

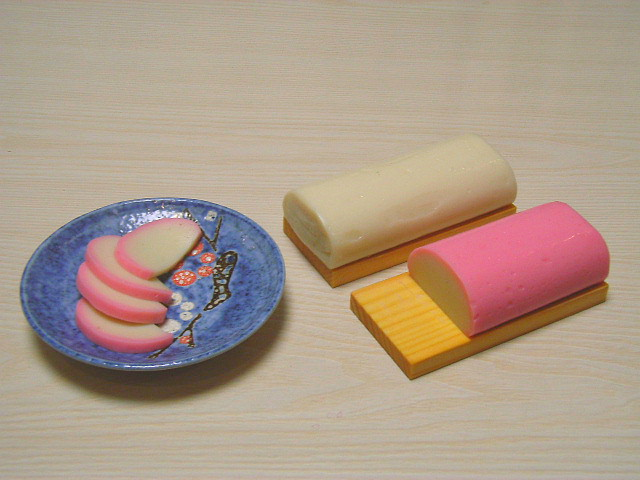
Kamaboko

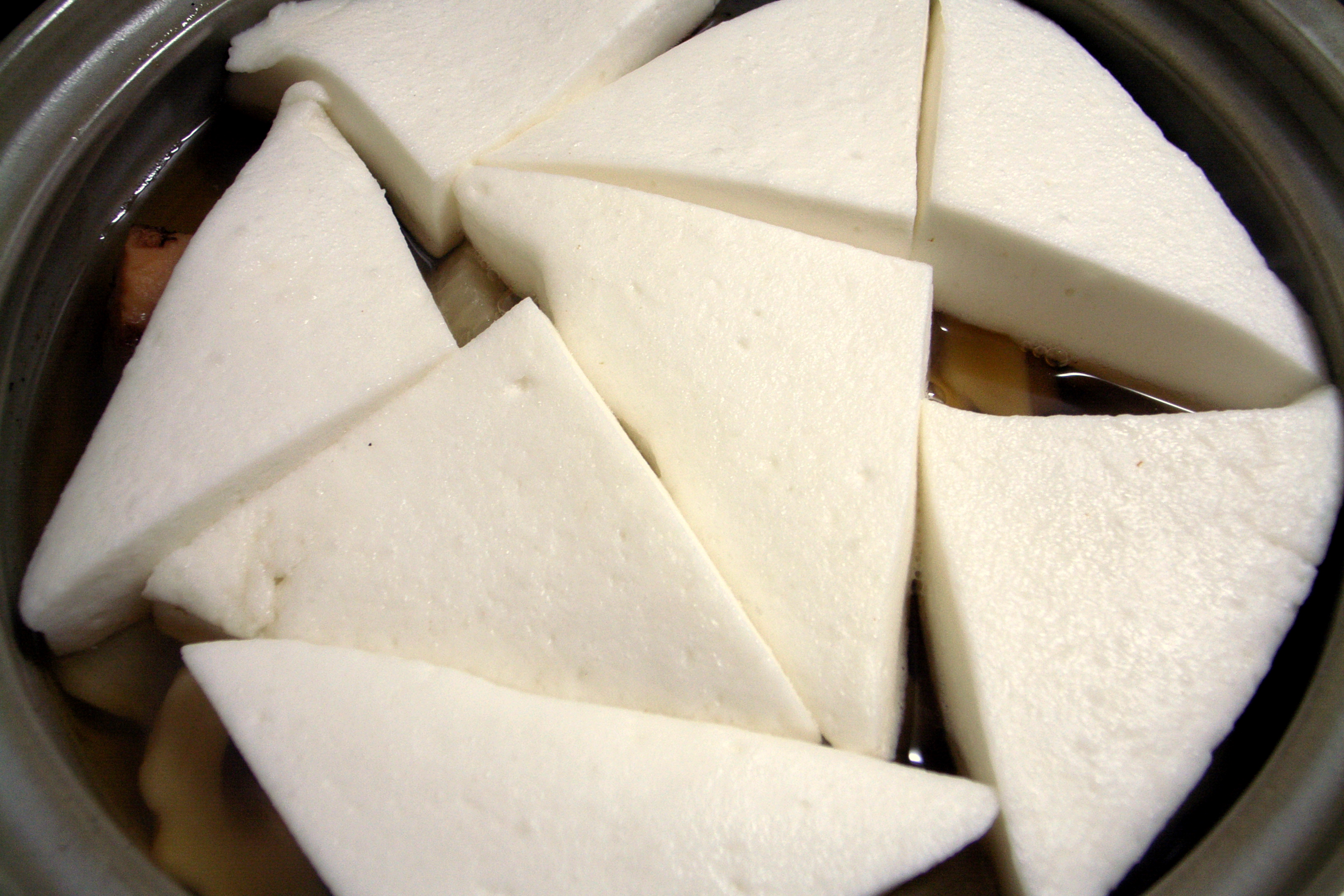
Hanpen

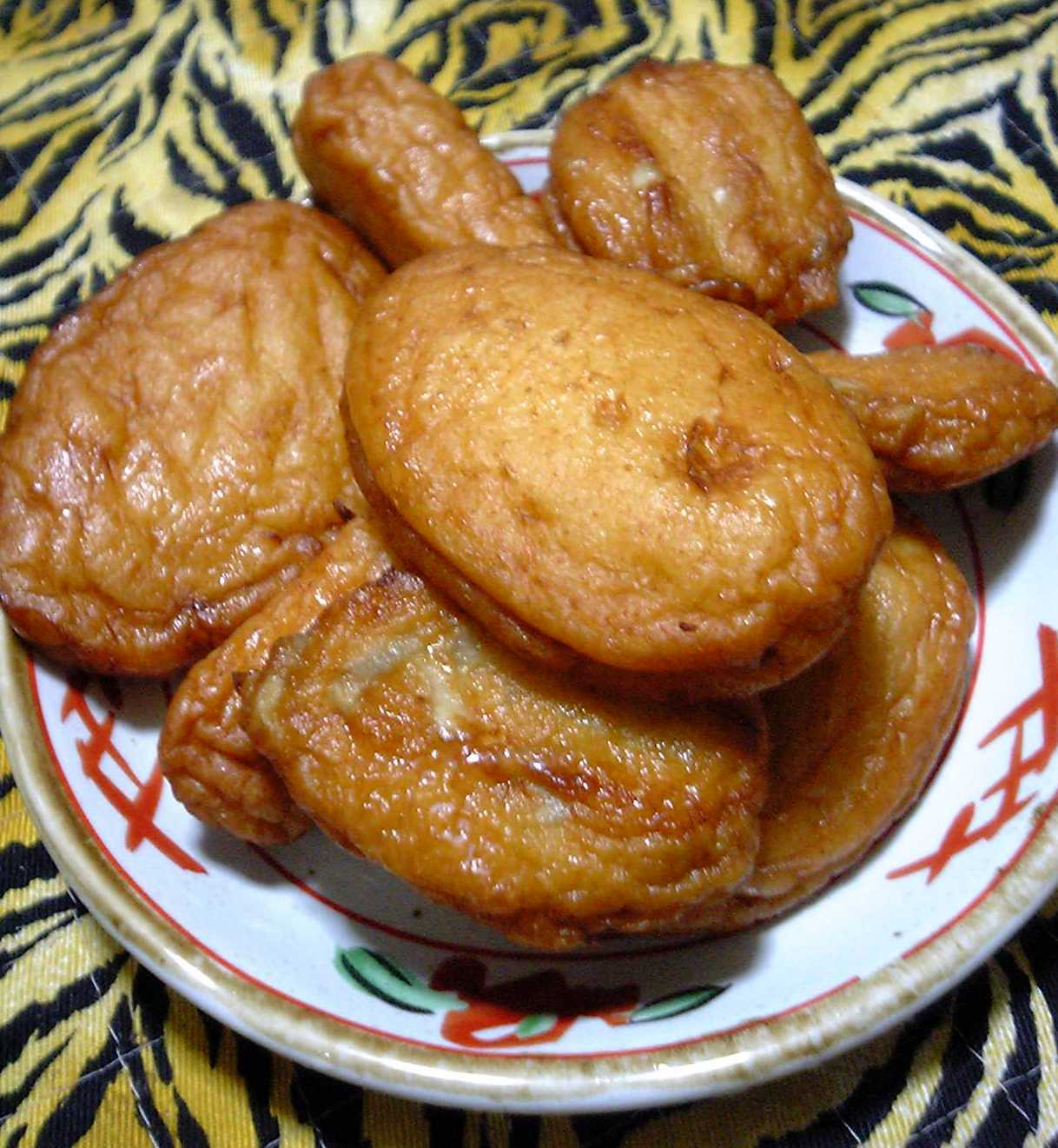
Satsuma-age

=== Myanmar ===
In Myanmar, fishcakes are made the flesh of the bronze featherback fish, called ngaphe (Burmese: ငါးဖယ်). Fishmongers traditionally use oyster shells or spoons to scrape the fish meat to sell. The meat of the fish is slammed or pounded several times in a mortar and pestle with herbs and spices, to create a chewy texture. After that, the meat is shaped into a small patty and fried, as one of many Burmese fritters.

=== Philippines ===
In the Philippines, fishcakes are eaten as street food and as a topping on dishes like noodle soup. Fish balls are eaten as street food, usually on a skewer or in a cup, paired with a dipping sauce. They are usually ball-shaped or cylinder-shaped. Kikiam is another variety where it is almost prepared like an eggroll. A mix of fish, shrimp and ground pork is wrapped in bean curd skin (transl. trgl – transl. tawpe) before steaming and then frying.

=== Singapore ===
Fishcakes and fish balls are prepared from one or more kinds of fish. They may contain starch, additional condiments or government permitted colouring agents. Fishcakes must contain at least 40% of fish under governmental regulations.

Homemade fishballs and fish cakes can also be made using store-bought or homemade fish paste. Fish paste that are sold commercially have to contain more than one fish, with possible additions of condiments, colouring agents or starch. Based on the Singaporean government Food Regulations, Fish Pastes should contain at least 70% fish. Homemade fish cakes are usually made from mackerel because of their sweeter taste and ease of preparation. Fish paste mixtures are often put in food processors or traditionally thrown against the side of mixing bowls to achieve the bouncier texture of fish cakes. They are then shaped by hand or in molds into various shapes and sizes and stored in the refrigerator or freezer till use.

=== Korea ===
In South Korea, fishcakes are called eomuk (어묵), or odeng (오뎅), which is a loan word from the Japanese stew oden). Fish cakes are mainly made of Alaska pollock or Golden threadfin bream which contains less fat. This is because fatty fish are not suitable for making fishcakes. Salt, sugar, flour, and starch are necessary ingredients as well. Also, other ingredients may be added in order to make fishcakes: onions, carrots, green onions, and cooking wine. It is normal to add several chemicals in order to have a better flavor, such as D-sorbitol (an artificial sweetener which has approximately 60% of the sweetness of sugar so that diabetic patients can consume), soy protein (protein extracted from soy which can make it possible to create a better texture of fish cakes with less amount of fish fillets), and D-xylose (a natural sweetener with low calories), or monosodium glutamate (MSG).

Usually made by deep-frying paste made from ground fish, eomuk can be boiled with other ingredients to make eomuk-tang (어묵탕; "fishcake soup") or eomuk-jeongol (어묵전골; "fishcake hot pot"), stir-fried to make eomuk-bokkeum (어묵볶음), and put in various dishes such as jjigae and gimbap.

Sold from street carts, eomuk can be boiled on a skewer in broth. The broth is sometimes provided to the customer in paper cups for dipping and drinking. Hot bar, also written as hotbar, is another version of eomuk sold during cold weather. While still served on a stick or skewer, the hot bar is deep-fried instead of boiled. In this form, the hot bar can be prepared according to any particular vendor's "secret" recipe: plain, mixed with vegetables such as diced carrot or whole perilla leaf, or served with any number of sauces or condiments including ketchup and mustard.

==== History ====
Japanese fishcakes were introduced to Korea during the 1910–1945 Japanese colonial period. The first eomuk processing plant in South Korea was DongKwangFood in Bupyeong Market in the 1950s in Busan. In 1953, Park Jae-Deok — who learned eomuk processing in Japan — founded Samjin Fish Cake (currently using the brand "Samjin Amook"), which has the longest history in Korea. It was shortly after the outbreak of the Korean War that many refugees migrated to Busan, resulting in a booming eomuk industry.

In the early 1990s, Busan-eomuk commonly sold in food trucks became a trend. The term Busan-eomuk began to be used for long, sausage-shaped eomuk. Since the food trucks usually served eomuk with a hot broth, eomuk became popular in winter. Even in contemporary Korea, eomuk food trucks can be easily found on major downtown streets.

During the 2010s, the eomuk industry in South Korea went through a major transformation, the public perception of eomuk changing from fast food to recognized delicacy. In December 2013, Samjin Fish Cake established an eomuk bakery in South Korea for the first time.

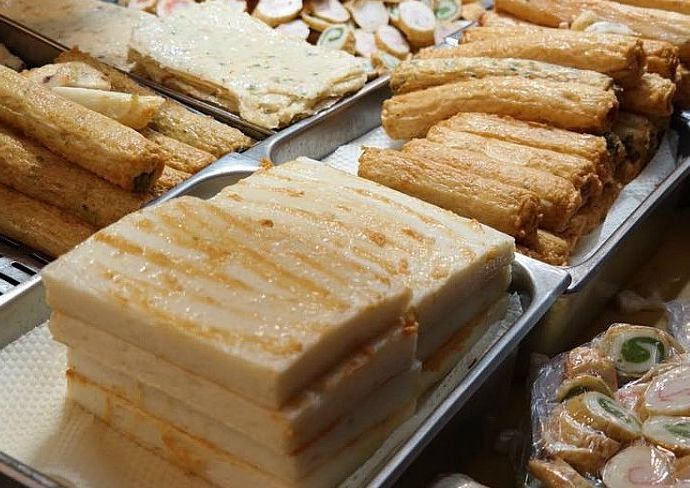
Various eomuk

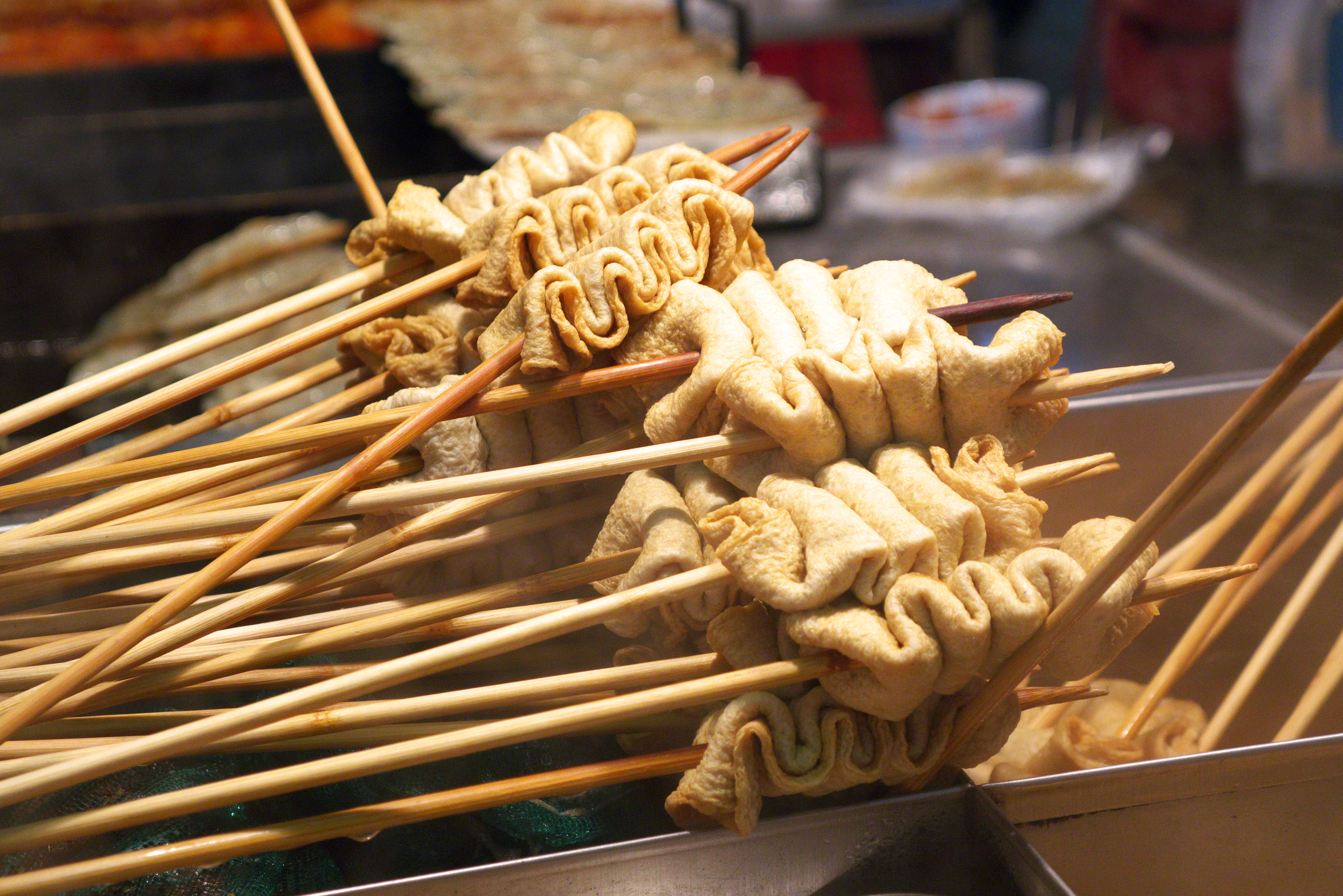
Street eomuk

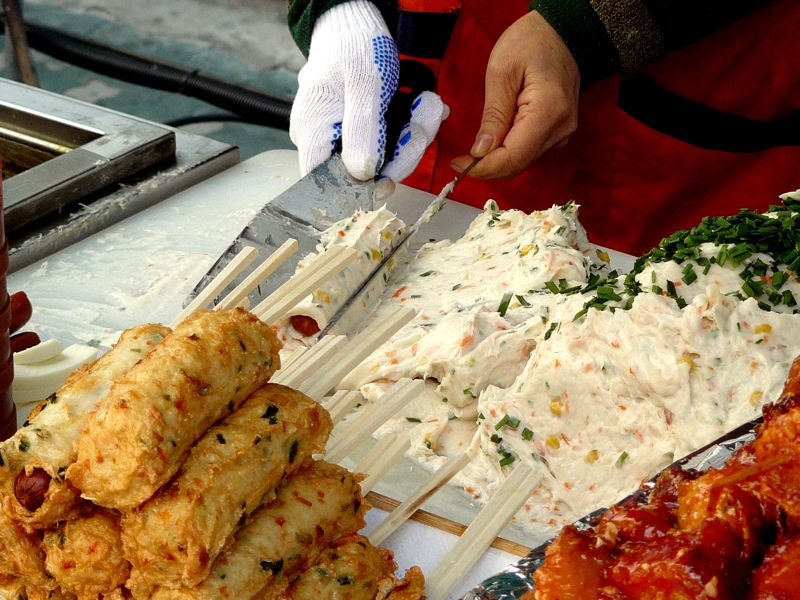
Eomuk-bar

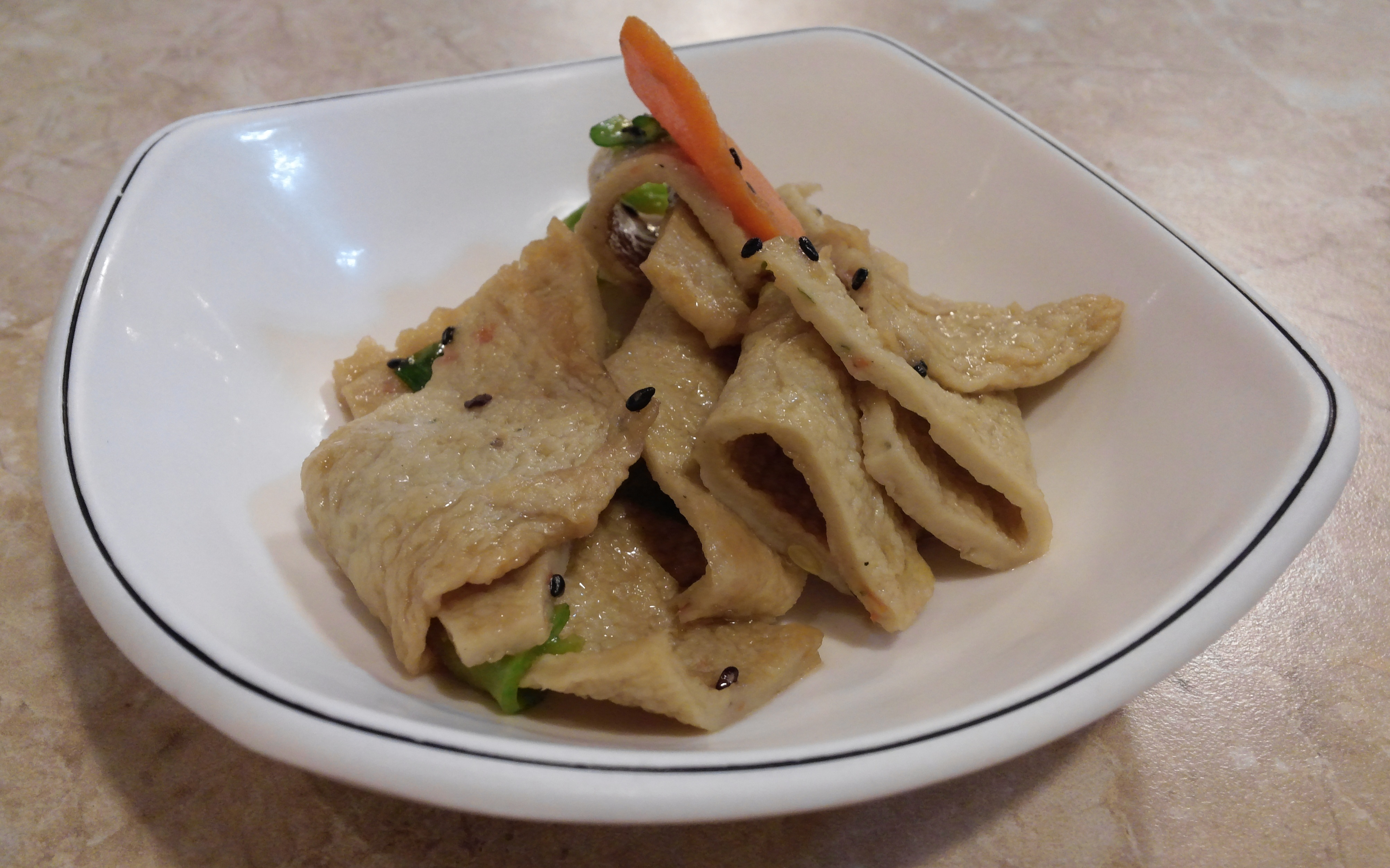
Eomuk-bokkeum

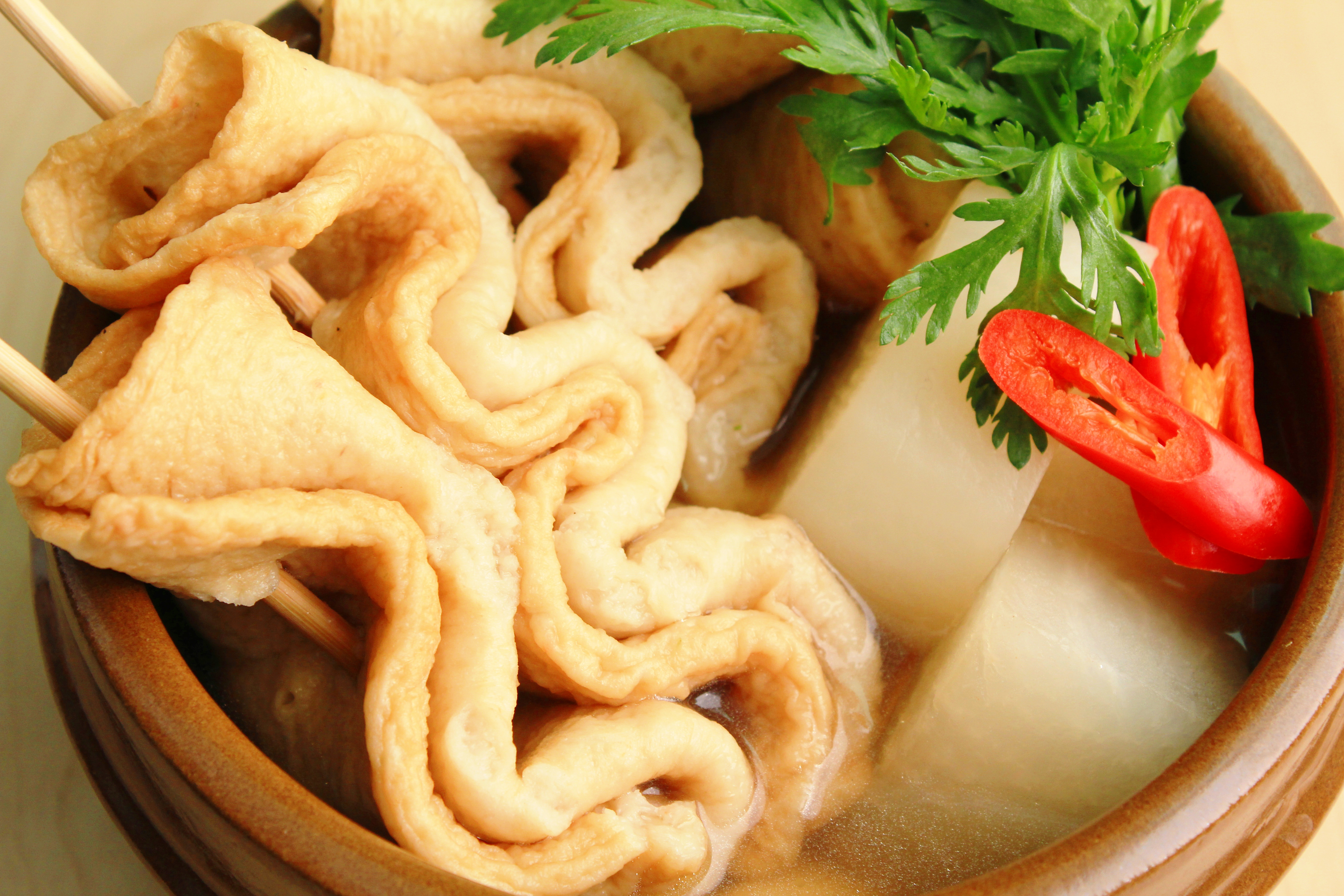
Eomuk-tang

=== Thailand ===
In Thai cuisine, the fish is first mashed and then mixed with chopped yardlong beans, fresh cilantro (including stalks), fish sauce, kaffir lime leaves, red curry paste, and an egg binding. This is deep-fried and usually served with a sweet chilli dipping sauce. Thot man pla have become popular around the world.

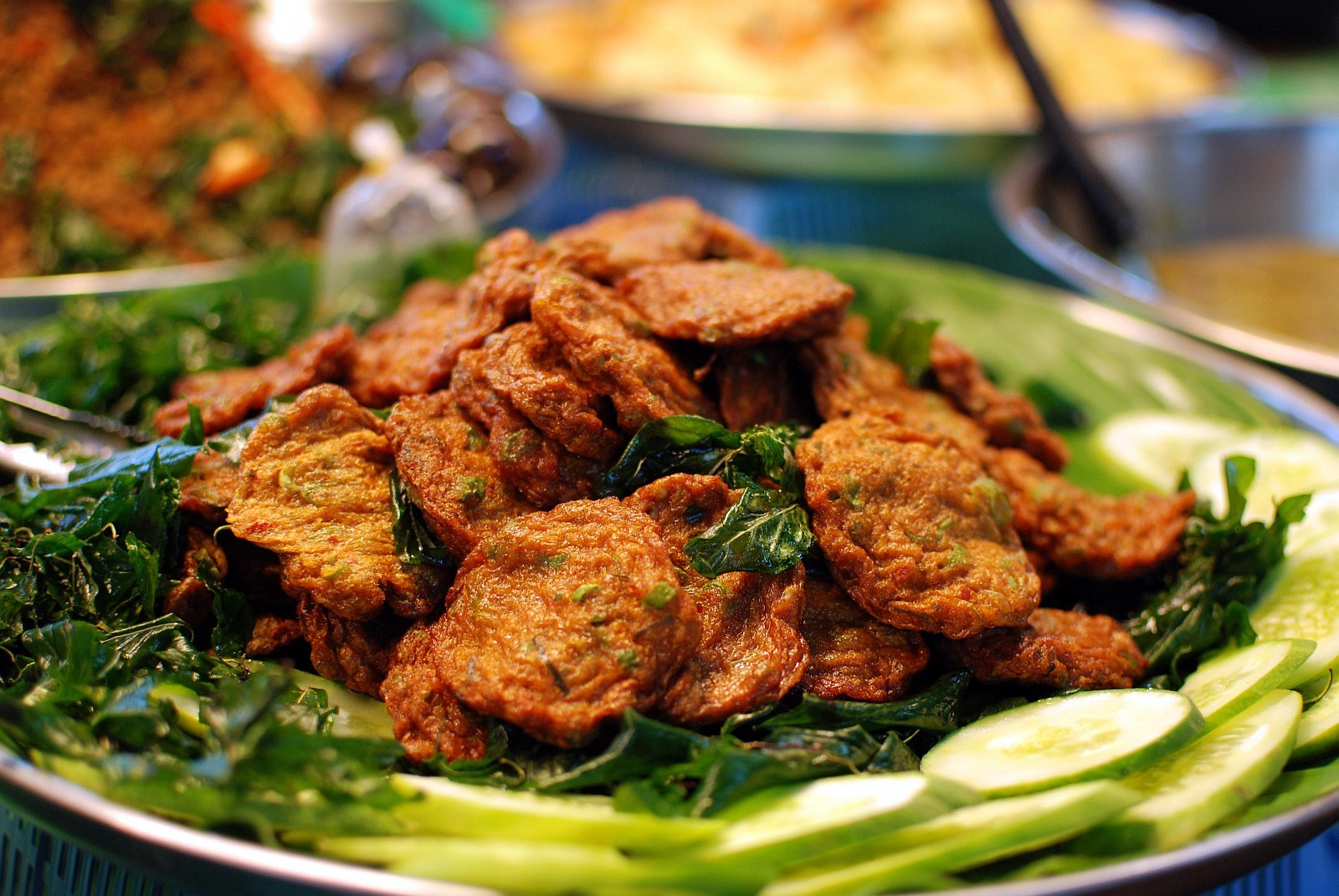
Thot man pla at a market in Chiang Mai

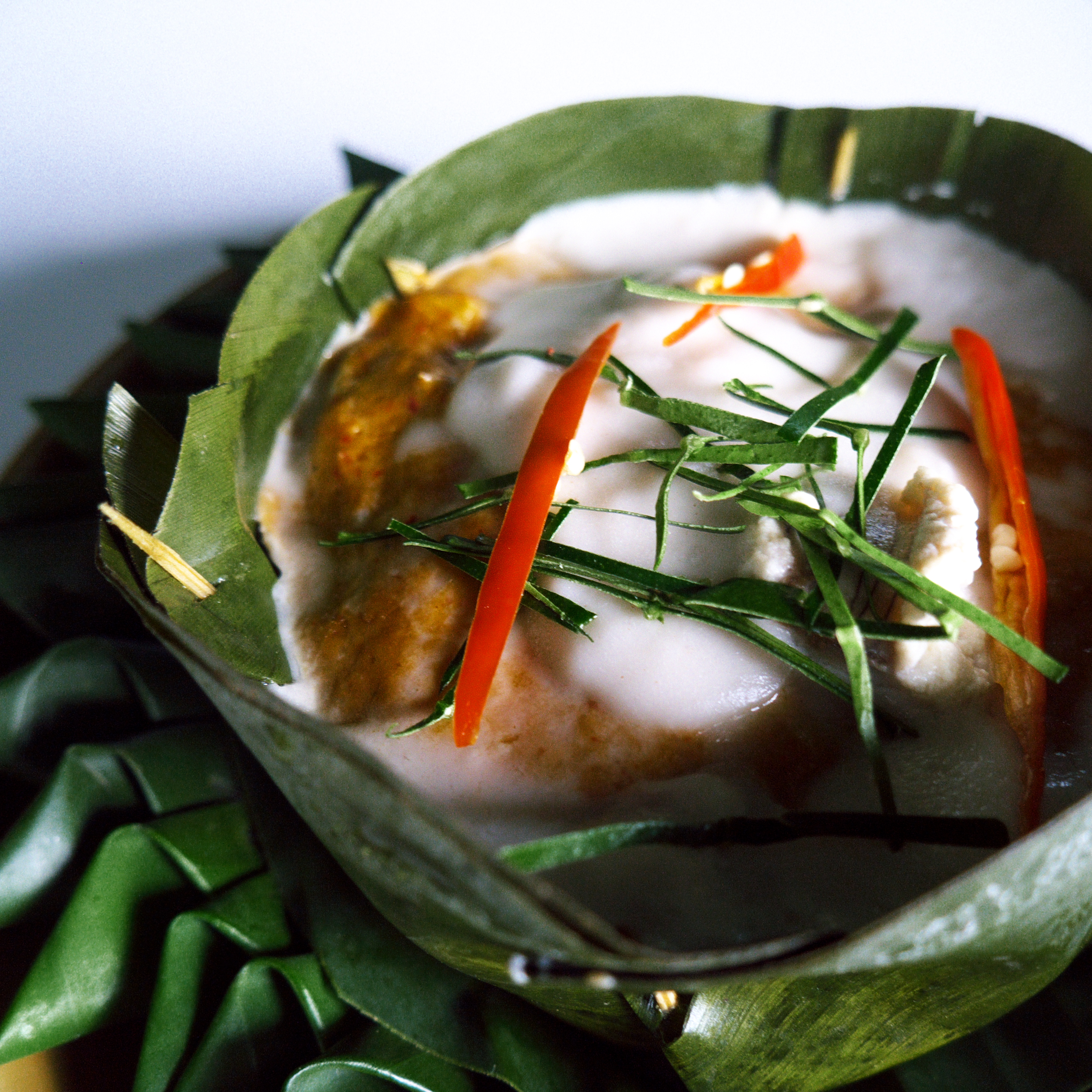
Steamed fish cake or locally known as Hor mok

=== Vietnam ===
In Vietnam, fishcakes are made of fresh fish, sometimes along with flour. The fishcakes can either be fried or steamed/boiled. These are known in Vietnamese as chả cá and are often included in Vietnamese noodle dishes such as bún riêu or with rice.

== Europe ==
=== Denmark ===
In Denmark, fiskefrikadeller (fried fish meatballs) are slightly elongated, pan-fried patties much like regular frikadeller. They are normally not breaded. A similar dish which is boiled, rather than fried, is called fiskeboller and added to certain soups, though it may be closer to a fish version of a knödel. In Southern Jutland, fiskefrikadeller sometimes contain smoked pork fat.

=== Norway ===
In Norway, fiskekaker are made much like the Danish fiskefrikadeller. They are fried and served with potatoes or pasta, broccoli and raw grated carrot, and often brown sauce instead of white.

The type of fish used varies with availability and recipe: Pollock, haddock, herring, wolf-fish and even salmon or trout are sold, and they are often marketed named after the fish they are made of; Seikaker, Koljekaker, Steinbitkaker, etc. Terms like "burger" is also used; "Lakseburger", "Fiskeburger".

Additionally there are fishballs and fishpudding, both more often served with white sauce.

=== Poland ===
In Poland, fishcakes are commonly served in the form of kotlety rybne ("fish cutlets") and are typically made with the ground meat of white fish, combined with a stale milk-soaked wheat bread roll (such as the Kaiser roll) or breadcrumbs, raw egg, finely chopped onions, seasonings and optionally herbs, all of which are mixed into a uniform mass, then shaped into small but thick patties, breaded and pan-fried. Thus prepared, kotlety rybne are a fish version of the pork-based kotlety mielone ("ground cutlets"), which themselves are similar or identical to the German Frikadellen.

=== Portugal ===
In Portugal, pastéis de bacalhau (codfish pasties) are a type of very popular fishcake. Pastéis are made of potato, codfish (bacalhau), parsley, and eggs.

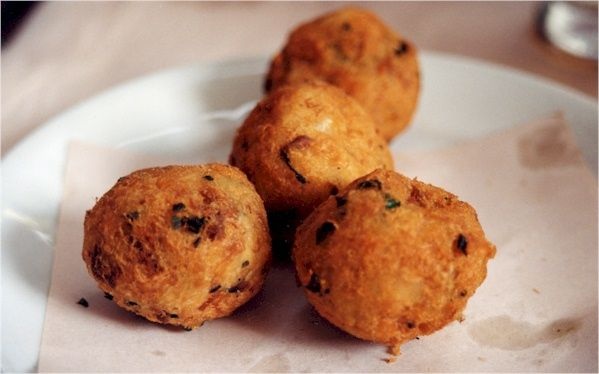
Bolinhos de bacalhau

=== Romania ===
In Romania, fishcakes are called chiftele de peşte and are made with carp.

=== Sweden ===
In Sweden, canned fiskbullar are widely found; in contrast to fiskefrikadeller, they are not fried but boiled and as a result are almost entirely white.

=== United Kingdom ===
Fishcakes are a popular item in Britain. They are often served in gourmet establishments as well as traditional chip shops, making them a ubiquitous dish. A fishcake is typically ordered in place of a piece of battered fish, and may be served in a roll as a fishcake 'butty'.

In England, particularly in Lancashire and parts of Yorkshire, a "chippy fishcake" is a variation traditionally served in many fish and chip shops. It consists of two slices of potato (sometimes parboiled), with offcuts of fish in between, deep-fried in batter. Chippy fishcakes can also be known as scallop fishcakes, or fish patties in Yorkshire. Another variation of the fishcake is the parsley cake which is sold in some fish and chip shops in and around Castleford, West Yorkshire, England. It consists of minced fish, mashed potato and fresh parsley, coated in breadcrumbs and deep-fried.

== See also ==
- Clam cake – Seafood dish
- Crab cake – American crab dish
- Fish fingers – Breaded processed fish
- Fish tofu
- List of fish dishes
- Salmon burger – Sandwich or burger made with fish
