= Nakji-bokkeum =

Korean stir-fried octopus dish

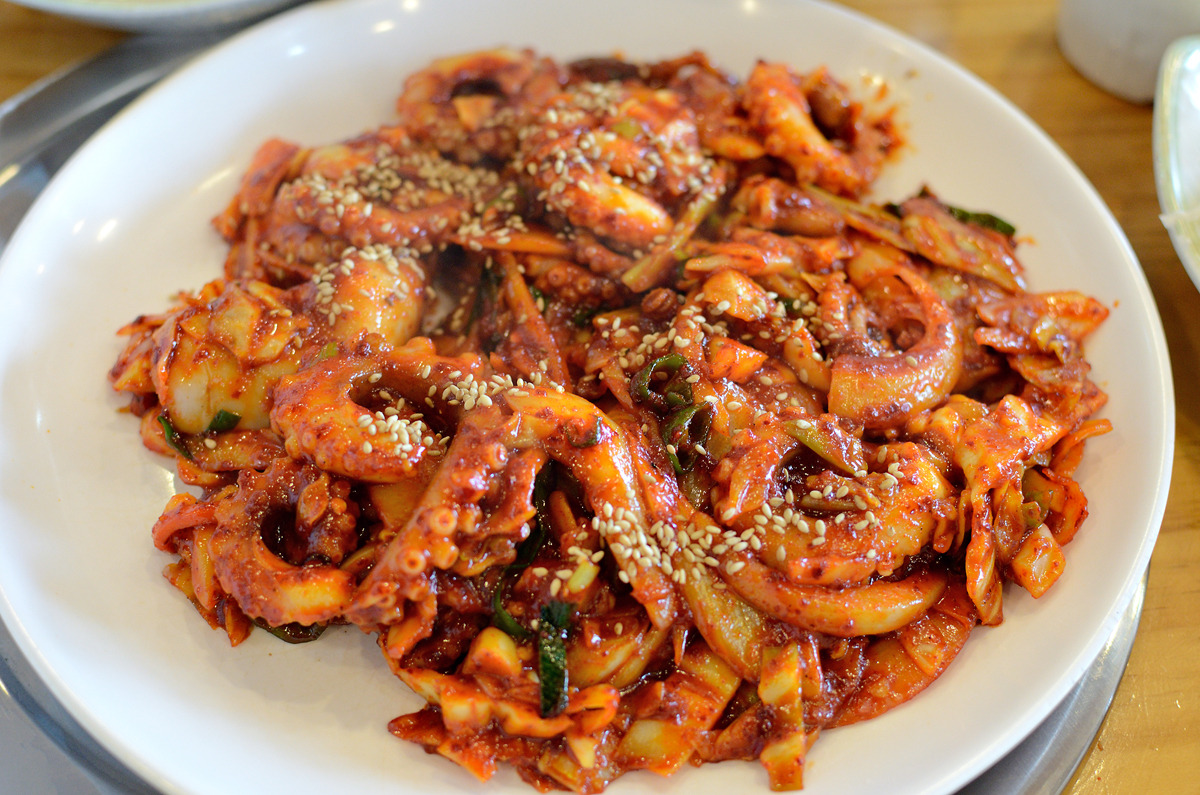
- Alternative names: Stir-fried octopus
- Type: Bokkeum
- Place of origin: Korea
- Main ingredients: Long arm octopus

Korean name
- Hangul: 낙지볶음
- RR: nakjibokkeum
- MR: nakchibokkŭm
- IPA: [nak̚.t͈ɕi.bo.k͈ɯm]

Nakji-bokkeum (Korean: 낙지볶음) or stir-fried octopus is a popular dish in Korea that is relatively recent, with origins dating back only two centuries and first being introduced in the early 1960s.

== History ==
While nakji bokkeum is a more modern dish only originating in the 1960s, it is a fairly simple and unassuming dish that feels like it is timeless and far older. The roots of its origins date back to the 19th century wherein octopus was mostly consumed either raw, dried, or pan-fried. Dishes such as nakjisukhoe (leached octopus) and nakjibaeksuk (boiled octopus) were served during the early 20th century. During this time, octopus began to be consumed more frequently due to traditionally perceived health benefits, some of which have been confirmed with modern nutritional science due to octopus being a lower calorie protein and micronutrient source. Other dishes with octopus were also developed from this trend such as yeonpotang (pellucid octopus soup) and nakji-bibimbap (mixed rice with octopus and vegetables).

There are several competing claims to be the creator of the dish which is sometimes referred to as "Mugyo-dong nakji bokkeum" after the neighborhood in which it was developed in the early 1960s. Soon, restaurants in the surrounding area adopted the dish, and it had spread throughout most of Korea by the end of the 1970s.

In Korea, nakji bokkeum is served very spicy. Shellfish soup and other more cooling or mild side dishes are typically served with it to reduce the sensation of hotness.

== Preparation ==
Nakji bokkeum is made with chopped octopus and vegetables such as onions, green onions, cabbage, and carrots. The octopus and vegetables are mixed with a marinade made with gochujang (red pepper paste), gochugaru chili flakes, soy sauce, garlic, salt, rice vinegar, and sugar. After marinating for anywhere from 3 hours to overnight, the marinated octopus and vegetables are then stir fried together. Nakji bokkeum, and other Korean dishes featuring octopus, are traditionally believed to be good for stamina, strength, and mental acumen. Nakji bokkeum is commonly served atop a bed of steamed rice and/or bean sprouts and topped with sesame seeds. Jogaetang (clam stew) or some other more mild and rich soup is almost always served alongside nakji bokkeum. Other side dishes like mildly pickled daikon or cucumber are commonly served as well.

== See also ==
- List of seafood dishes
