= Fish tofu =

Food item made from fish

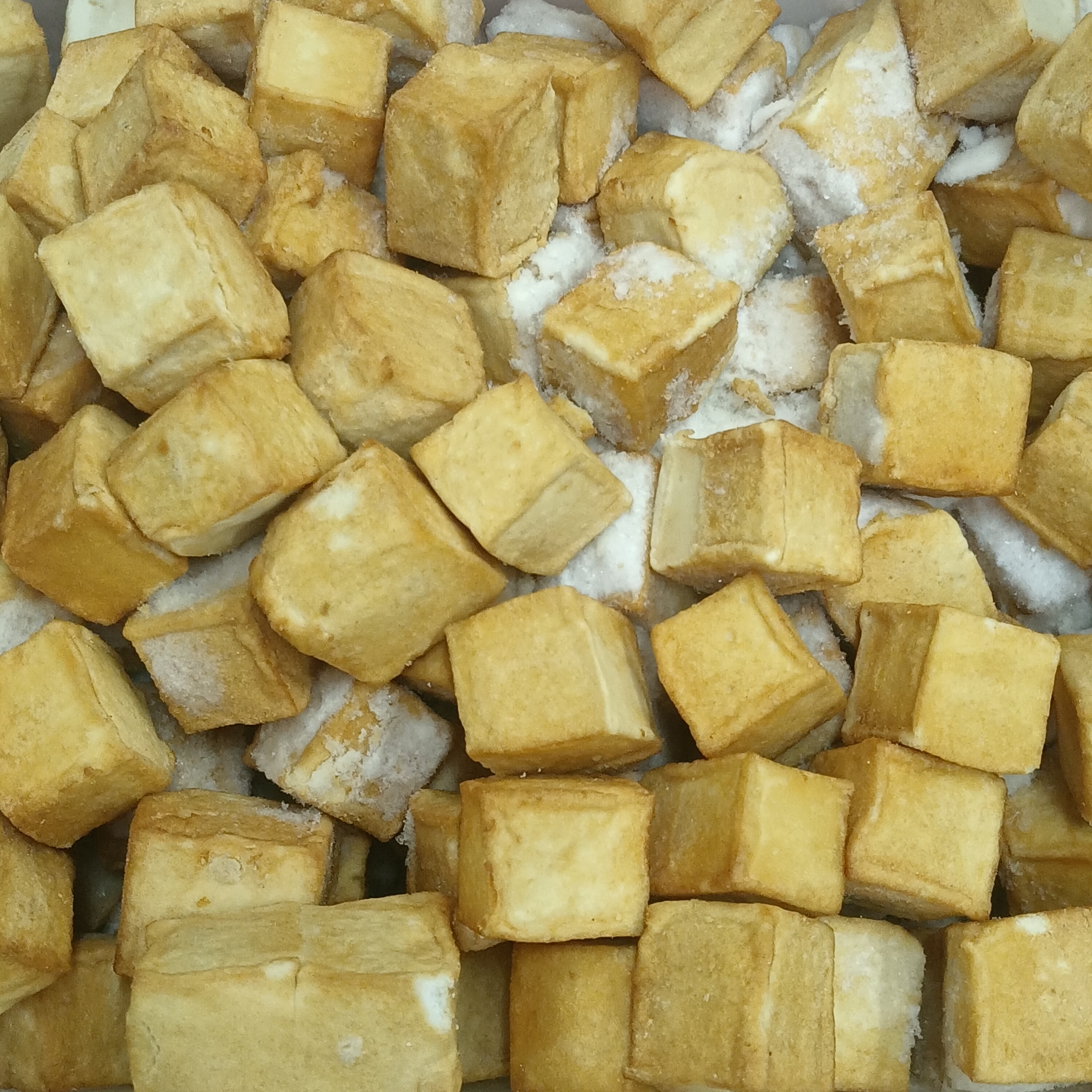
- Fish tofu in blocks
- Place of origin: China
- Main ingredients: Surimi

Fish tofu (Chinese: 鱼豆腐; pinyin: yú dòufu) is a fish product that resembles the form and texture of tofu. It is made from fish paste (also known as surimi).

== History ==
According to legend, fish tofu was invented by Shi Lang (1621–1696) in Tainan, present-day Taiwan. He was a naval officer under Zheng Jing, the second king of Tungning. Shi first popularised fish tofu with soldiers; legend says that the recipe became popular among the general public and has been passed down for centuries.

== See also ==
- Fishcake
