= Gizzard =

Digestive organ of some animals

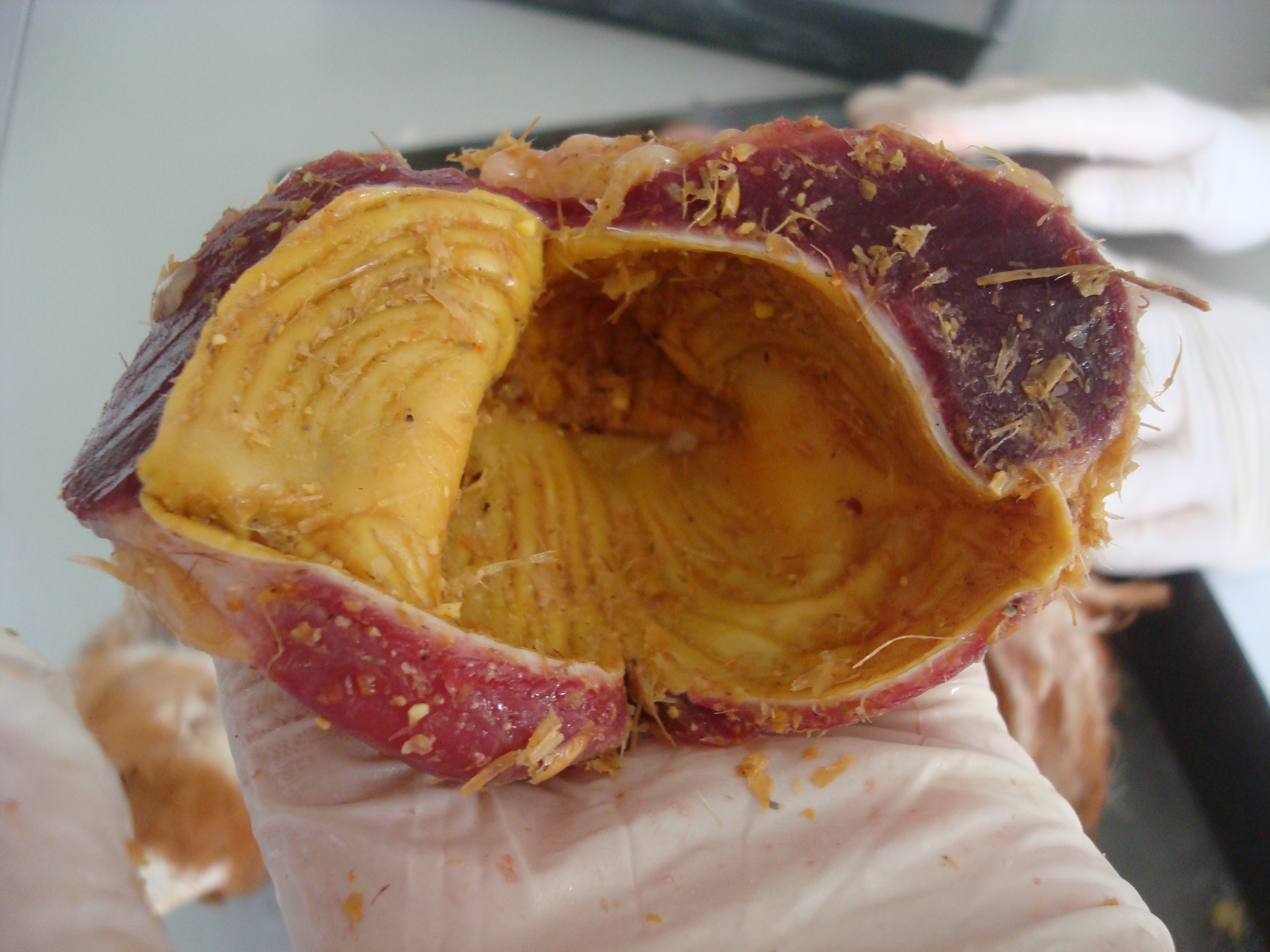
Gizzard of a chicken

The gizzard, also referred to as the ventriculus, gastric mill, and gigerium, is an organ found in the digestive tract of some animals, including archosaurs (birds and other dinosaurs, crocodiles, alligators, pterosaurs), earthworms, some gastropods, some fish, and some crustaceans. This specialized stomach constructed of thick muscular walls is used for grinding up food, often aided by particles of stone or grit. In certain insects and molluscs, the gizzard features chitinous plates or teeth.

== Etymology ==
The word gizzard comes from the Middle English giser, which derives from a similar word in Old French gésier, which itself evolved from the Latin gigeria, meaning giblets.

== Structure ==
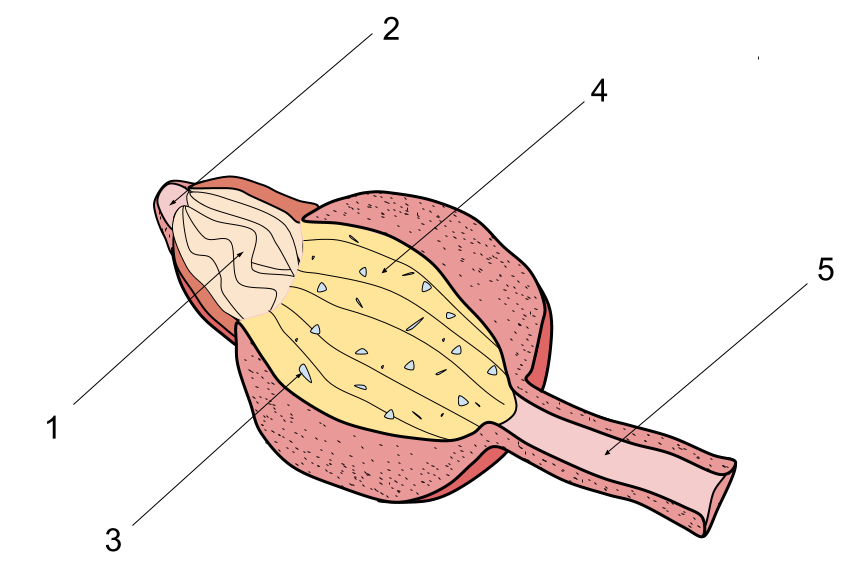
Chicken gizzard cross-section. (1) Proventriculus (2) Esophagus (3) Stones (4) Muscular wall of gizzard (5) Duodenum

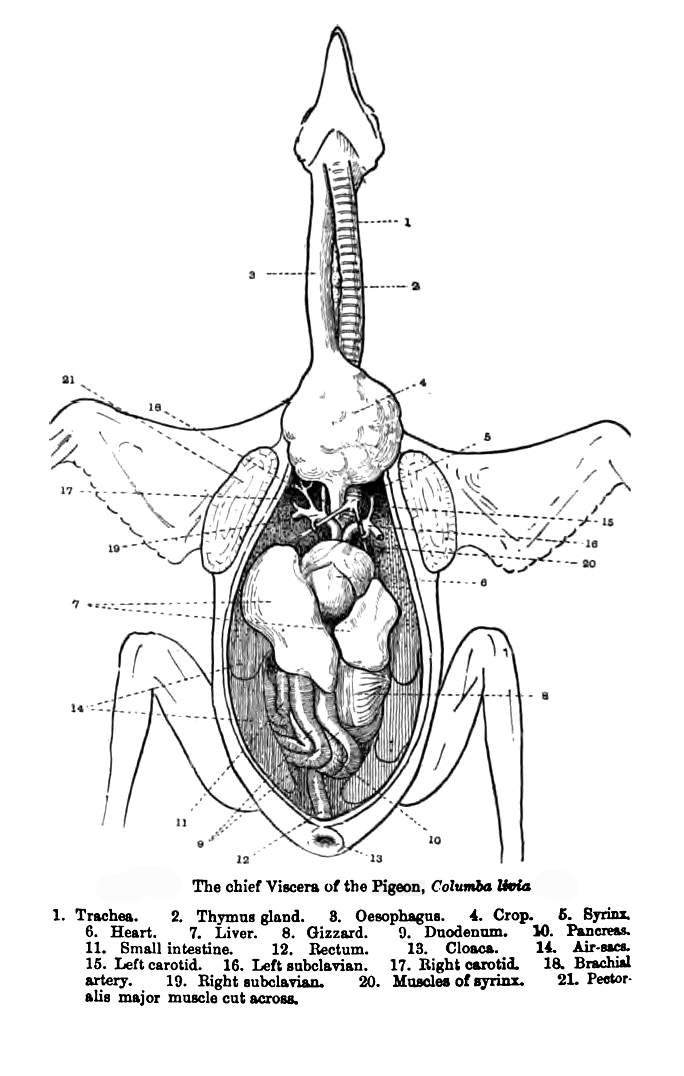
The gizzard (serial 8) of a pigeon, seen at the right of the duodenum between the legs.

=== In birds ===
Birds swallow food and store it in their crop if necessary. Then the food passes into their glandular stomach, also called the proventriculus, which is also sometimes referred to as the true stomach. This is the secretory part of the stomach. Then the food passes into the gizzard (also known as the muscular stomach or ventriculus). The gizzard can grind the food with previously swallowed grit and pass it back to the true stomach, and vice versa. In layman's terms, the gizzard 'chews' the food for the bird because it does not have teeth to chew food the way humans and other mammals do.

By comparison, although in birds the stomach occurs in the digestive tract prior to the gizzard, in grasshoppers the gizzard occurs prior to the stomach, while in earthworms there is only a gizzard, and no stomach.

=== Koilin lining ===
In order to protect the muscles of the gizzard, the organ has a multi-layered membrane - or gastric cuticle - made of koilin, a carbohydrate-protein complex (and not keratin as once believed) to protect the muscles. The thickness of this membrane varies with the types of food the animal eats, with diets heavier in grains, seeds, and insects creating thicker membranes than those consisting of fruits, worms, meat, and other softer edibles. In some animals the membrane is slowly worn and replaced over time, while others will discard the worn lining in its entirety periodically.

The lining is critical to the proper functioning of the gizzard, but in some animals it can play an additional role as well. The male hornbill, for example, will fill its gizzard with fruit and then slough off the entire membrane to present it like a 'bag of fruit' to its mate during the nesting season.

=== Gizzard stones ===
Some animals that lack teeth will swallow stones or grit to aid in fragmenting hard foods. All birds have gizzards, but not all will swallow stones or grit. Those that do employ the following method of chewing:

A bird swallows small bits of gravel that act as 'teeth' in the gizzard, breaking down hard food such as seeds and thus helping digestion.

These stones are called gizzard stones or gastroliths and usually become round and smooth from the polishing action in the animal's stomach. When too smooth to do their required work, they may be excreted or regurgitated.

== Animals with gizzards ==
=== Mammals ===
Pangolins lack teeth and grind their food in a gizzard-like structure alongside pebbles.

=== Birds and other archosaurs ===
All birds have gizzards. The gizzards of emus, turkeys, chickens, and ducks are most notable in cuisine (see below). Crocodilians such as alligators and crocodiles also have gizzards.

Dinosaurs that are believed to have had gizzards based on the discovery of gizzard stones recovered near fossils include:

- Psittacosaurus
- Massospondylus
- Sellosaurus
- Omeisaurus
- Apatosaurus
- Barosaurus
- Dicraeosaurus
- Seismosaurus

The belief that Claosaurus had a gizzard has been discredited on the grounds that the fossil remains this claim was based on were another species and the stones merely from a stream.

At least some pterosaurs seemingly had gizzards. The most notable cases are Pterodaustro (inferred via gastroliths) and Rhamphorhynchus (directly preserved).

Carnivorous birds such as birds of prey as well as kiwis have membranuous gizzards as opposed to the sub-compressed gizzards of most birds.

Conversely, it is thought that some extinct birds like Enantiornithes did not have gizzards.

=== Fish ===
The mullet (Mugilidae) found in estuarine waters worldwide, and the gizzard or mud shad, found in freshwater lakes and streams from New York to Mexico, have gizzards. The gillaroo (Salmo stomachius), a richly colored species of trout found in Lough Melvin, a lake in the north of Ireland, has a gizzard which is used to aid the digestion of water snails, the main component of its diet.

=== Crustaceans ===
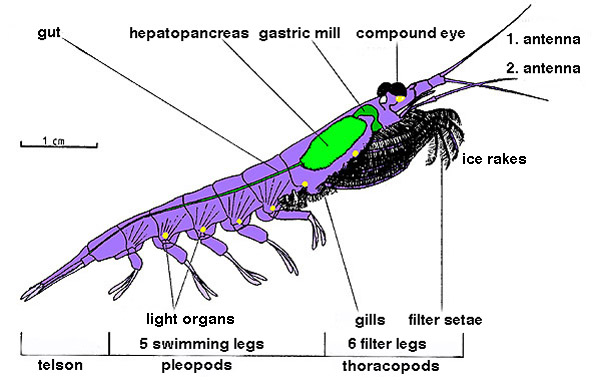
Body structure of a krill, showing the gastric mill (a.k.a. gizzard) in a typical crustacean

Some crustaceans have a gizzard although this is usually referred to as a gastric mill.

=== Earthworms ===
Earthworms also have gizzards.

== In cuisine ==
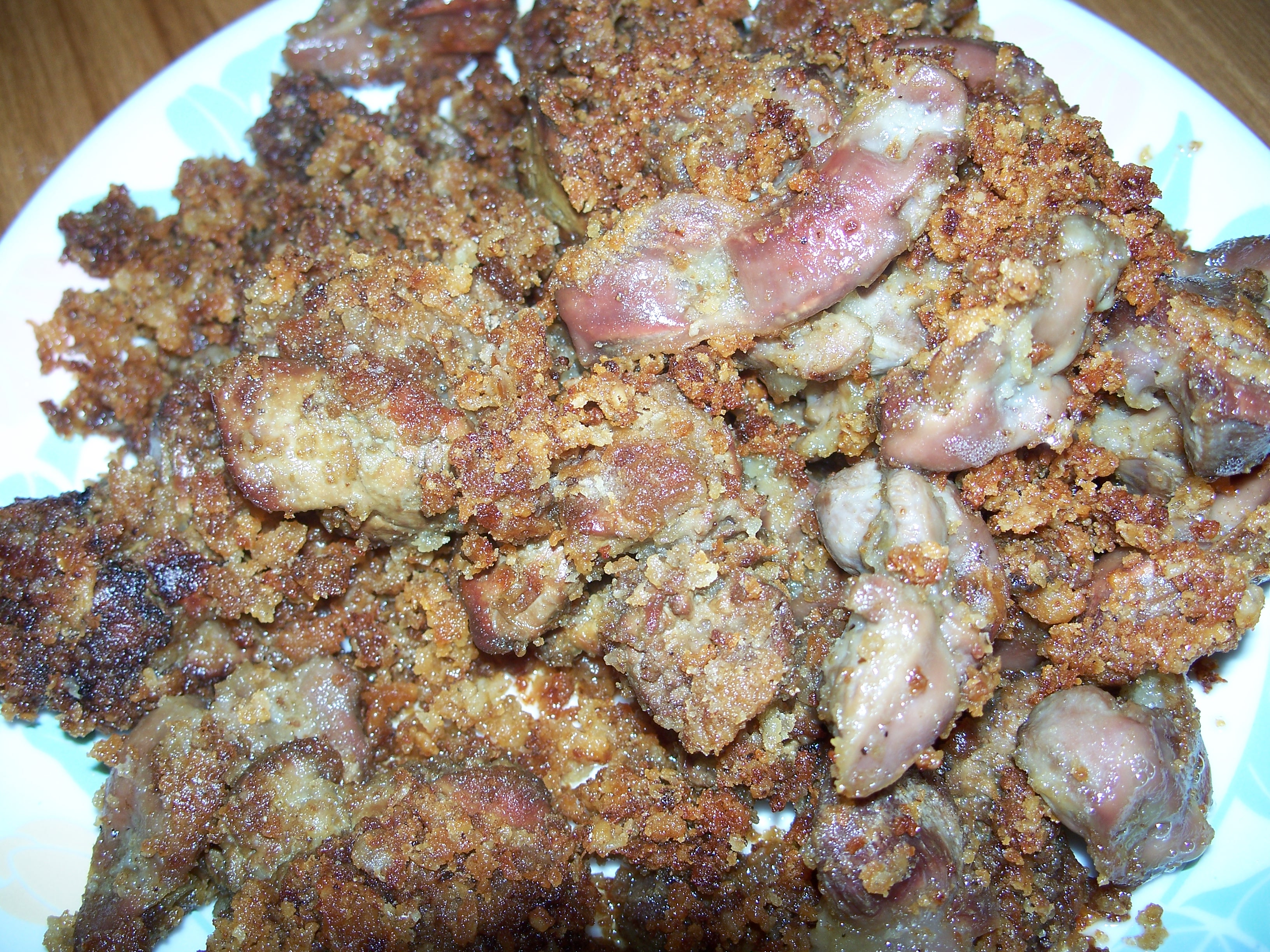
Fried gizzards and livers

Poultry gizzards are a popular food throughout the world.

Grilled chicken gizzards are sold as street food in Haiti and throughout Southeast Asia. They are considered offal.

Giblets consist of the heart, liver and gizzard of a bird, and are often eaten themselves or used as the basis for a soup or stock.

Gizzard and mashed potato is a popular dish in many European countries.

=== Europe ===
Stewed gizzards are eaten as a snack in Portugal, with a tomato based sauce.

In Spain, they are cooked on the plancha, and eaten while they are crispy on the outside.

In Hungary, it is made with paprika as zúza pörkölt.

In France, especially the Dordogne region, duck gizzards are eaten in the traditional Périgordian salad, along with walnuts, croutons and lettuce.

In Italy, gizzards are often used mixed with other offal.

In eastern Slavic countries, gizzards are the basis of many soups, such as rassolnik.

In Yiddish, gizzards are referred to as pupik'lech (also pipiklach, in its less normative form), literally meaning navels. The gizzards of kosher species of birds have a green or yellowish membrane lining the inside, which must be peeled off before cooking, as it lends a very bitter taste to the food. In traditional Eastern European Jewish cuisine, the gizzards, necks and feet of chickens were often cooked together, although not the liver, which per kosher law must be broiled. Kosher butchers often sell roasting chickens with the gizzard, neck and feet butchered and left in the cavity to be used for making chicken soup.

=== Asia ===
In Indonesia, gizzard and liver (ati ampela) are considered part of a complete fried poultry dish.

In Japan, gizzard is called zuri or sunagimo; usually it is cooked in yakitori (Japanese style skewered barbecue). In Kyushu (southern Japan), gizzard is fried into karaage.

In Korea, chicken gizzard, called dak-ttongjip, is stir-fried and eaten as anju or yasik. In some places, it is prepared raw and eaten mixed with garlic and onion.

In Taiwan, gizzards are often slow-cooked and served hot or cold in slices, with green onions and soy sauce. Skewered deep-fried gizzards without batter are also popular and served on the menu of many fried chicken stores.

In Mainland China, duck gizzard is a common snack, eaten alongside other duck parts such as feet, neck, heart, tongue, or head. Areas famous for their gizzard are Sichuan and Hubei provinces. Wuhan city in Hubei is famous for its brand of spicy gizzard, called jiujiuya (Simplified Chinese: 久久鸭). In Northern China, one can find barbecued duck gizzard.

In Pakistan, gizzard (Urdu: کلیجی, Romanized:Kaleji) is usually cooked along the liver and consumed as it is as well as main course of food. Gizzard of chicken in usual days, and that of cows and goats are cooked in the days of Eid ul Adha.

The word sangdana is commonly used to refer to chicken gizzards in Northern India. The word is derived from Persian (sang = stone and dana = grain). Another name is pathri. It may be served cooked in a curry, while barbecued skewered gizzards are also popular. In Kerala, vattum-karulum (literally translates to gizzard-liver curry) is a popular dish.

In Iran, some kebab restaurants mix chicken gizzards in their koobideh kebabs to increase the meat content. Gizzards are usually cooked at the same time along with chicken, packets of gizzards are also sold separately.

In Nepal, gizzard is called jaatey or pangra. It is eaten most often with drinks.

In the Philippines, gizzard is called "Balun Balunan". It is usually cooked as a street food in a skewered barbecue style, though some households treat it like an entree. The most common style is "Adobo".

=== Africa ===
In Ghana and Togo, it is eaten boiled, fried or grilled. Grilled, skewered gizzards, with spices and optional green peppers and onions, are popular.

In Nigeria, gizzard is either grilled or fried and served with stew and fried plantain, known as gizdodo. Skewered gizzards are also popular.

In Kenya, Uganda, Cameroon and Nigeria, the gizzard of a cooked chicken is traditionally set aside for the oldest or most respected male at the table.

In Uganda, gizzard and other giblets are now commonly sold separately in the frozen section of supermarkets.

=== Americas ===
Pickled turkey gizzards are a traditional food in some parts of the Midwestern United States. In Chicago, gizzard is battered, deep fried and served with french fries and sauce. The Chamber of Commerce in Potterville, Michigan has held a Gizzard Fest each June since 2000; a gizzard-eating contest is among the weekend's events. In the Southern United States, the gizzard is typically served fried, sometimes eaten with hot sauce or honey mustard, or added to crawfish boil along with crawfish sauce, and it is also used in traditional New Orleans gumbo.

In Mexico, they are eaten with rice or with chicken soup. They are also served grilled and prepared scrambled with eggs, onions, garlic and salsa; and served with beans and tortillas for breakfast and other meals.

In Trinidad and Tobago, gizzards are curried and served with rice or roti bread; it can also be stewed.

== Generic meaning ==
The term "gizzards" can also, by extension, refer to the general guts, innards or entrails of animals.
