= Komatsushima =

Komatsushima 小松島市
- City
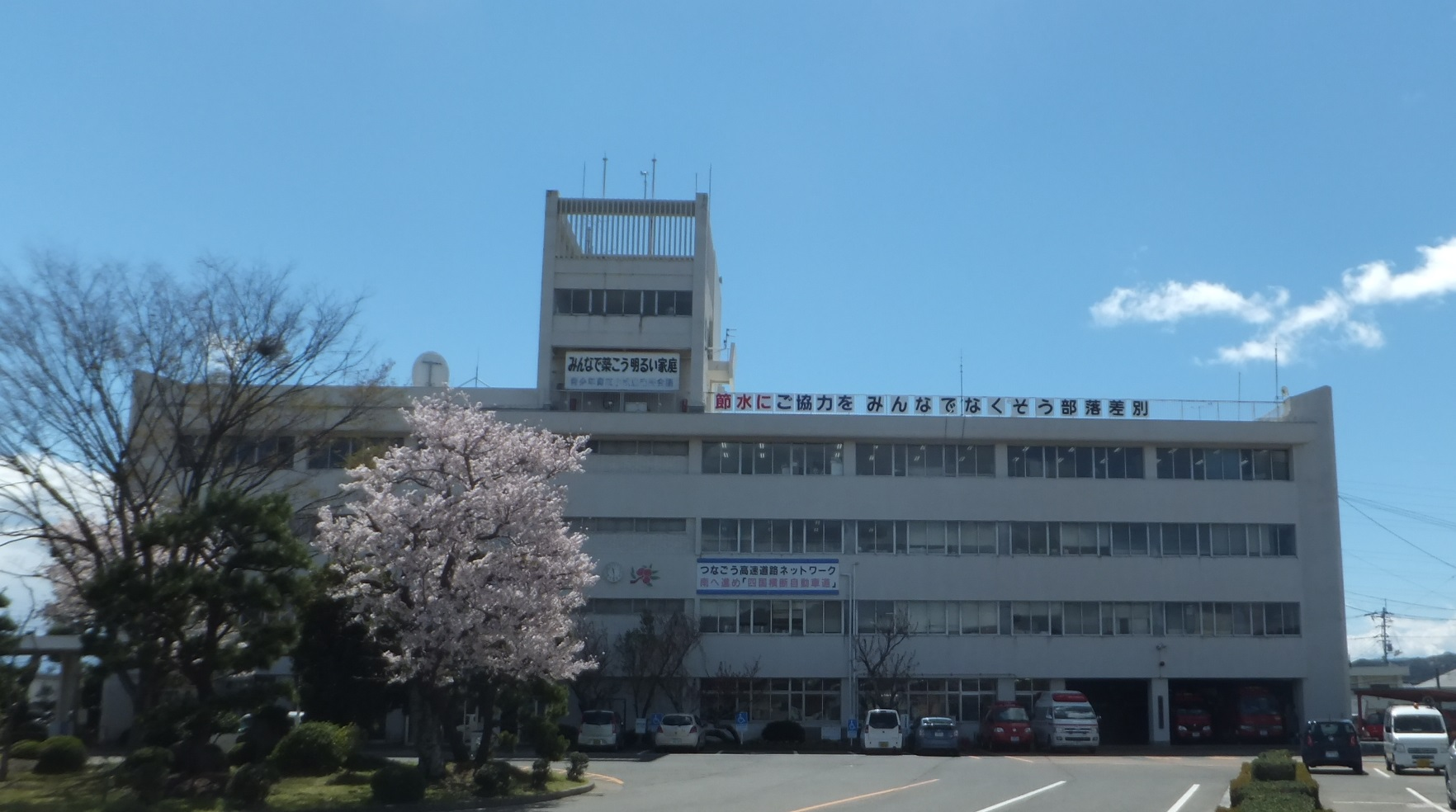
- Komatsushima City Hall

- Flag Emblem
- Interactive map of Komatsushima
- Location in Japan
- Coordinates: 34°00′01″N 134°35′04″E
- Country: Japan
- Region: Shikoku
- Prefecture: Tokushima

Government
  - Mayor: Toshio Nakayama

Area
  - Total: 45.37 km^{2} (17.52 sq mi)

Population (June 30, 2022)
  - Total: 36,128
  - Density: 796.3/km^{2} (2,062/sq mi)
- Time zone: UTC+09:00 (JST)
- City hall address: 1-1 Yokosuchō, Komatsushima-shi, Tokushima-ken 773-8501
- Website: Official website
- Symbols
- Flower: Cornus florida
- Tree: Myrica rubra

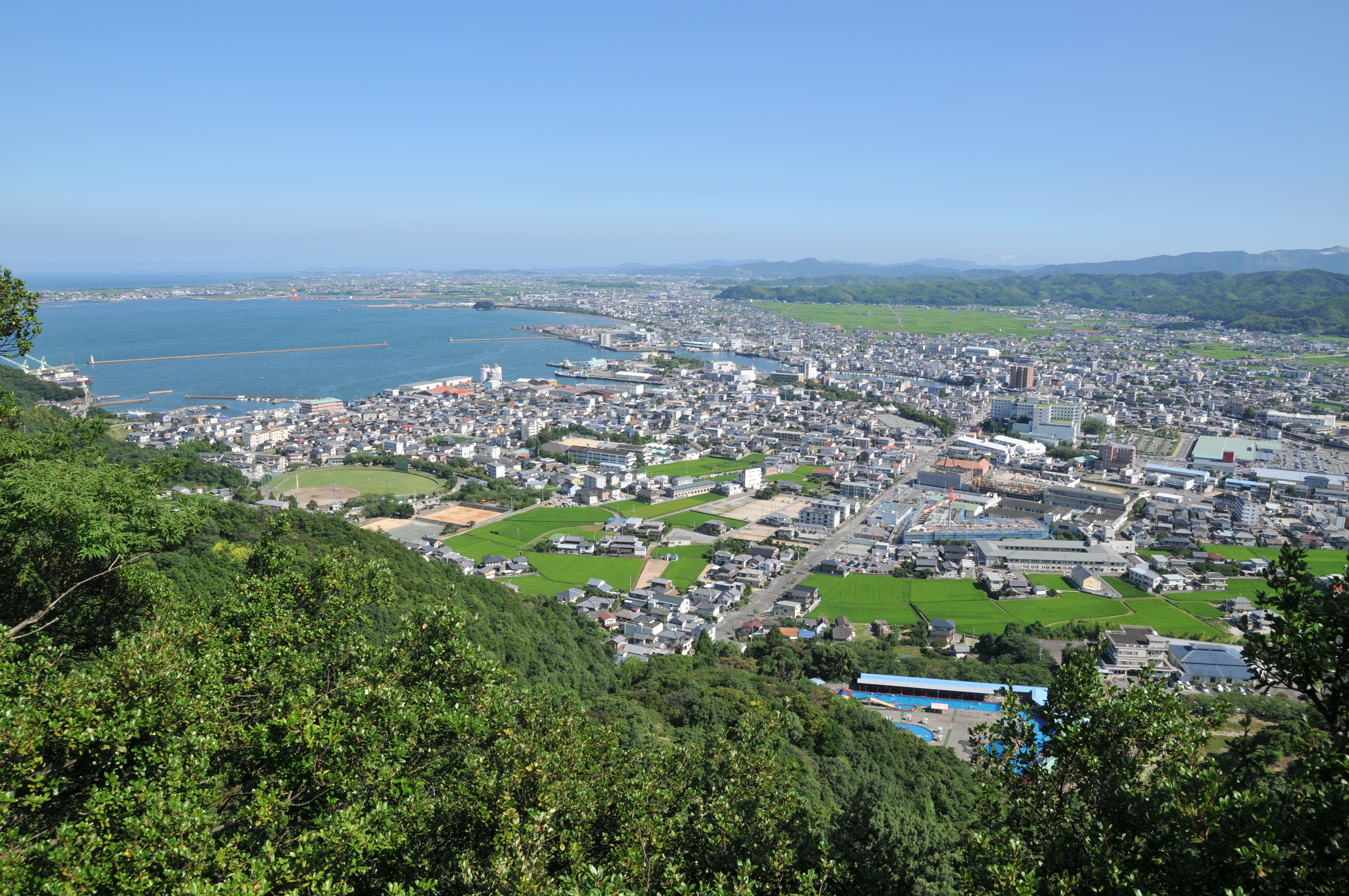
Komatsushima panorama

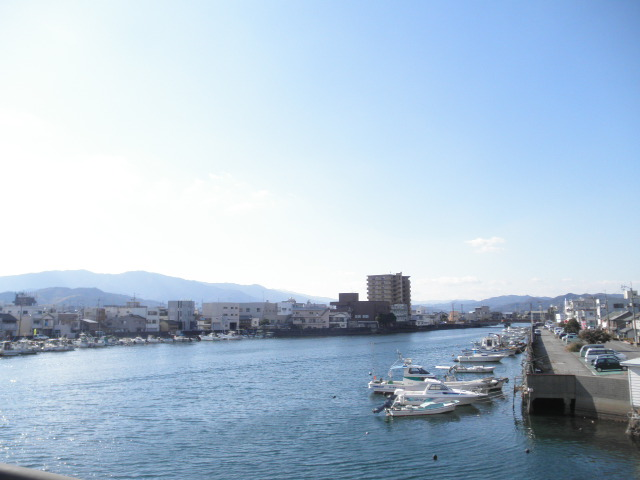
Kandase River in Komatsushima

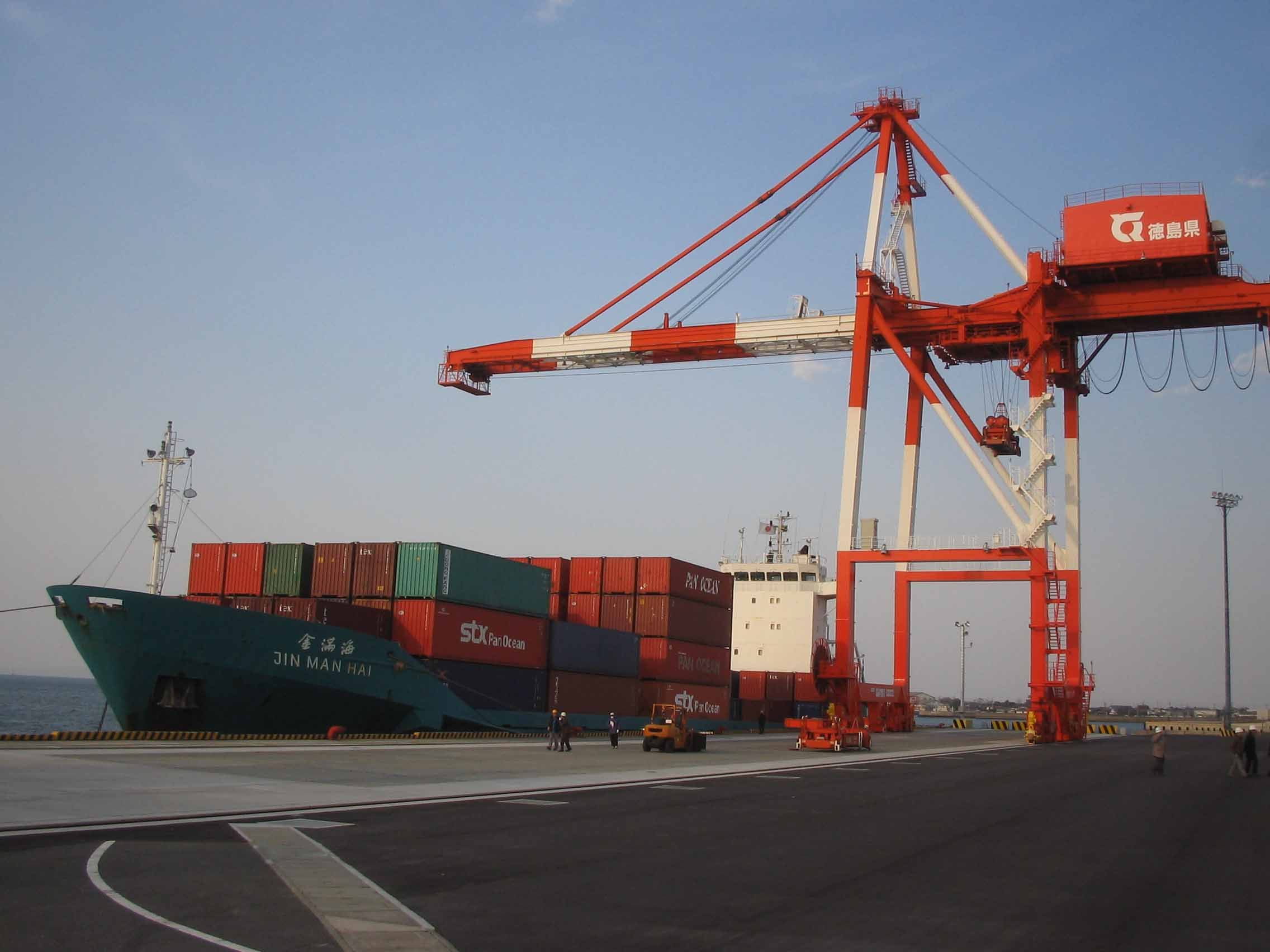
Komatsushima Port

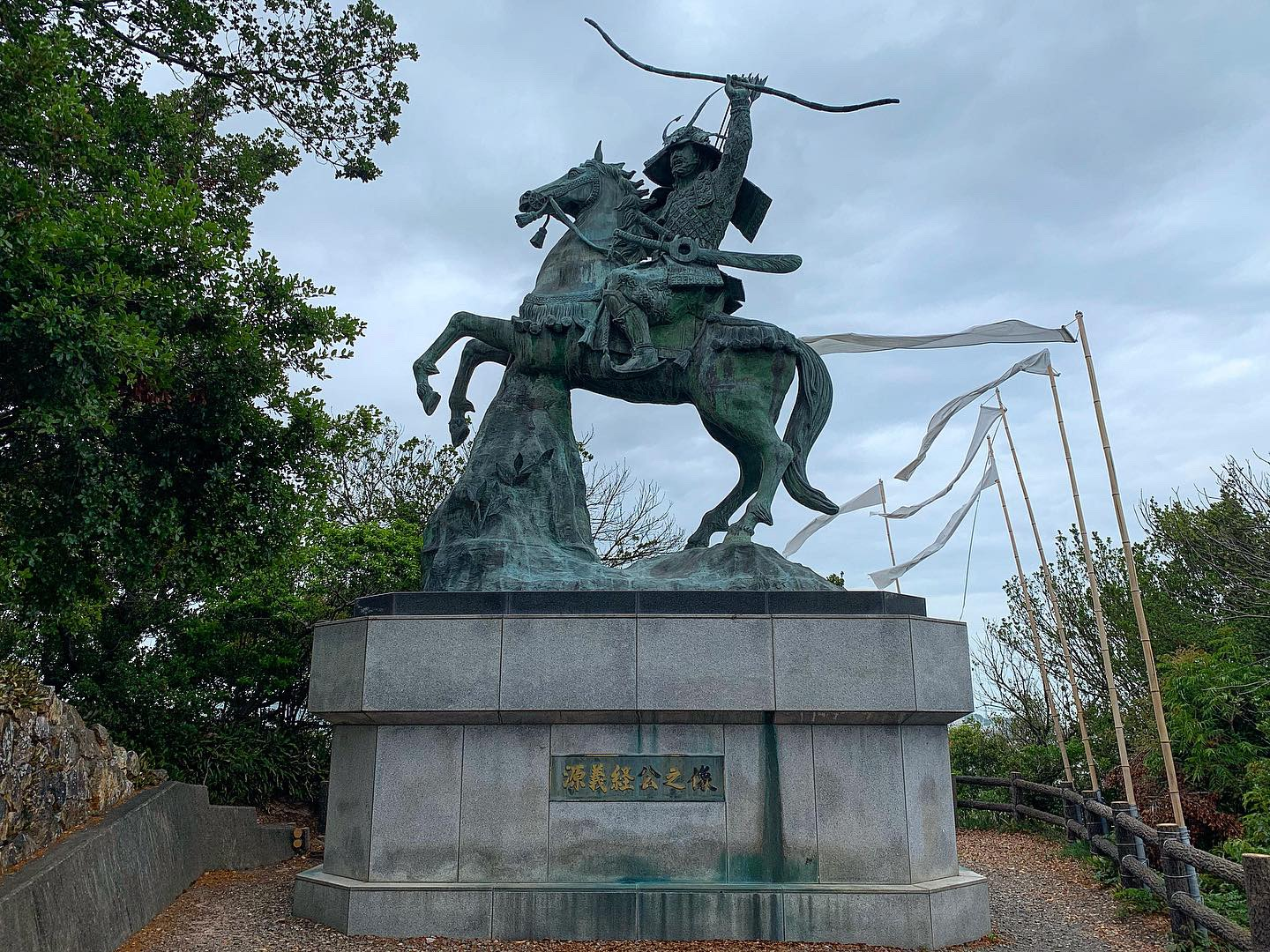
Statue of Minamoto no Yoshitsune

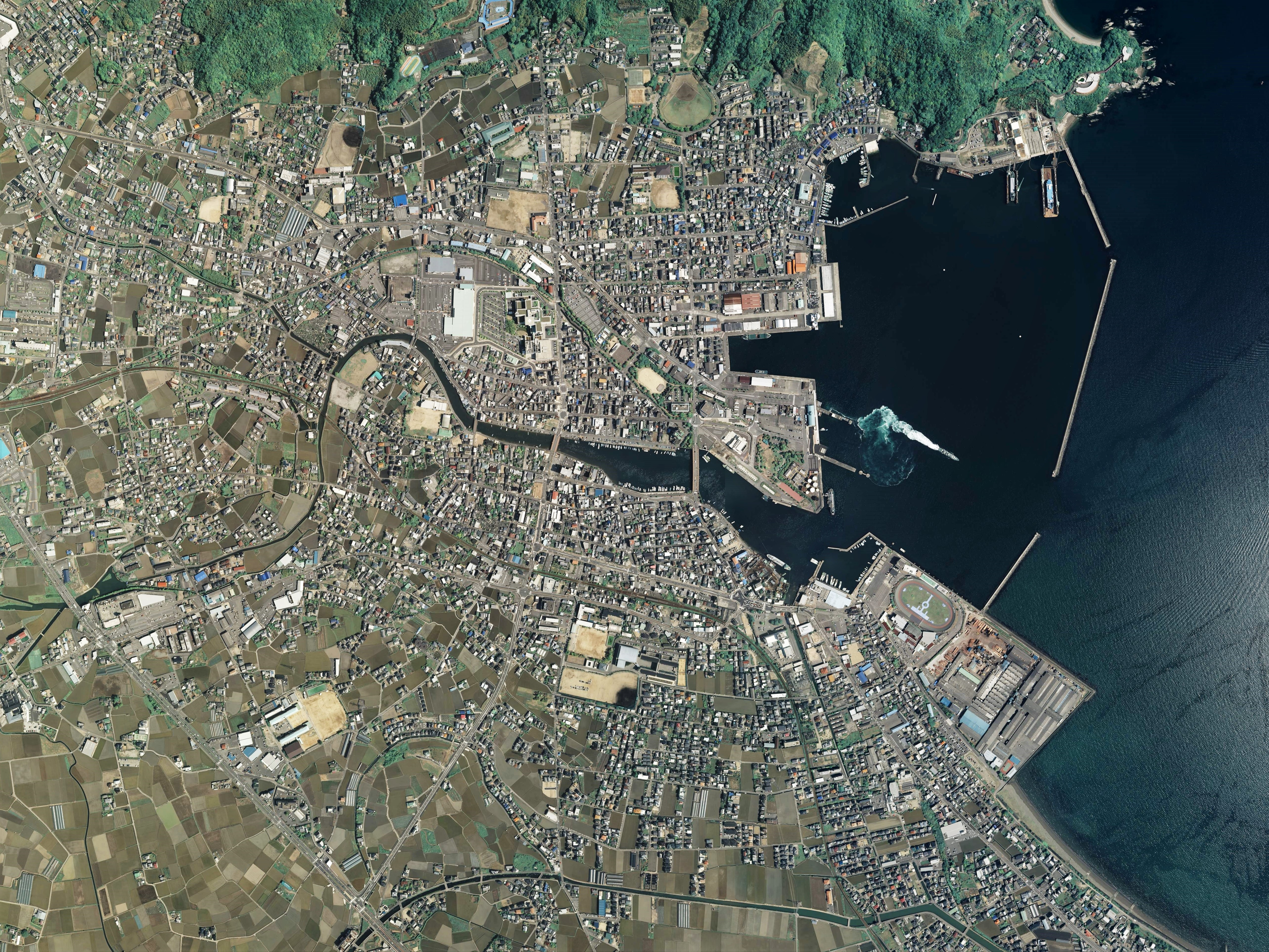
Aerial View of Komatsushima city center

Komatsushima (小松島市, Komatsushima-shi) is a city located in Tokushima Prefecture, Japan. As of 30 June 2022, the city had an estimated population of 36,128 in 17181 households and a population density of 800 persons per km^{2}. The total area of the city is 45.37 square kilometres (17.52 sq mi).

== Geography ==
Komatsushima is located in eastern Tokushima Prefecture, south of Tokushima city, facing the Kii Channel. The city is built on the delta of the Katsuura River and is surrounded by mountains on its landward sides.

=== Neighbouring municipalities ===
Tokushima Prefecture

- Awa
- Katsuura
- Tokushima

=== Climate ===
Komatsushima has a humid subtropical climate (Köppen Cfa) characterized by warm summers and cool winters with light snowfall. The average annual temperature in Komatsushima is 16.6 °C. The average annual rainfall is 2128 mm with September as the wettest month. The temperatures are highest on average in August, at around 26.8 °C, and lowest in January, at around 7.0 °C.

== Demographics ==
Per Japanese census data, the population of Komatsushima has slowly declined over the past 60 years.

Historical population
| Year | Pop. | ±% |
|---|---|---|
| 1920 | 23,319 | — |
| 1930 | 28,222 | +21.0% |
| 1940 | 29,469 | +4.4% |
| 1950 | 39,744 | +34.9% |
| 1960 | 39,884 | +0.4% |
| 1970 | 40,507 | +1.6% |
| 1980 | 43,636 | +7.7% |
| 1990 | 43,188 | −1.0% |
| 2000 | 43,078 | −0.3% |
| 2010 | 40,630 | −5.7% |

== History ==
As with all of Tokushima Prefecture, the area of Komatsushima was part of ancient Awa Province. During the Genpei War, it was the location where Minamoto no Yoshiatsu landed in Shikoku in his campaign against the Heike clan at the Battle of Yashima. During the Edo period, the area was part of the holdings of Tokushima Domain ruled by the Hachisuka clan from their seat at Tokushima Castle. Following the Meiji restoration, the village of Komatsushima was established within Katsuura District, Tokushima with the creation of the modern municipalities system on October 1, 1889. It was raised to town status on November 1, 1908. In April 1951, Komatsushima annexed the neighboring town of Tatsue. Komatsushima was raised to city status on June 1, 1951. The neighboring town of Sakano was annexed on September 30, 1956.

== Government ==
Komatsushima has a mayor-council form of government with a directly elected mayor and a unicameral city council of 17 members. Komatsushima, together with the other municipalities of Katsuura District, contributes three members to the Tokushima Prefectural Assembly. In terms of national politics, the town is part of Tokushima 1st district of the lower house of the Diet of Japan.

== Economy ==
Komatsushima prospered in the Edo Period as one of the main ports of Shikoku, especially for the export of indigo, which was a major local product. In the modern period, Komatsushima has developed into an industrial and regional commercial center. Agriculture (notably the production of rice, shiitake mushrooms and horticulture) and commercial fishing are significant, but declining, contributors to the local economy. Since the Meiji period, industries related to textiles, food processing and paper were developed along the Katsuura River: however, the closing of the Toyobo Komatsushima Mill and Nippon Paper Industries Komatsushima Mill in the 2000s and the discontinuation of the Komatsushima Line railway dealt severe blows to the economy.

== Education ==
Komatsushima has 11 public elementary schools and two public middle schools operated by the city government and two public high schools operated by the Tokushima Prefectural Department of Education. The prefecture also operates two special education schools for the handicapped.

== Transportation ==
=== Railway ===
Shikoku Railway Company – Mugi Line

- Chūden - Minami-Komatsushima - Awa-Akaishi - Tatsue

=== Highways ===
- National Route 55
- National Route 195

== Local attractions ==
- Onzan-ji, 18th temple of the Shikoku pilgrimage.
- Tatsue-ji, 19th temple of the Shikoku pilgrimage.
- Kinchō Tanuki- world's largest bronze tanuki statue
- Hatayama Yoshitsune Horse Statue- statue of Minamoto no Yoshitsune
- Yoshitsune Dream Road

== Notable people from Komatsushima ==
- Hiroyuki Hayashi, football player
- Kunihiko Ikuhara, creative artist
- Ren Osugi, actor
- Kotori Shigemoto, tarento, fashion model, singer and voice actress
- Toshikazu Yamashita, sport shooter
