= Ido-ji =

Ido-ji (Japanese: 井戸寺) is a temple in Tokushima, Tokushima Prefecture, Japan. It is Temple # 17 on the Shikoku 88 temple pilgrimage. The main image is of Yakushi Nyorai (Bhaisajyaguru).

== History ==
The temple was constructed in 673 during Emperor Tenmu's reign. During the Tenshō (天正) era (1582), the temple during fighting between the forces of Chōsokabe Motochika (長宗我部 元親) and Sogō Masayasu. In the Manji (万治) era (1661), the temple was rebuilt with the support of Hachisuka Mitsutaka.

== Temple Grounds ==
- Daimon (Nio-mon Gate) – A large, vermilion-lacquered gate constructed in the *buke-zukuri* (samurai residence) style. It was relocated here from the Otani Villa, a secondary residence of the Hachisuka clan, the feudal lords of the Tokushima Domain. The gate underwent a cosmetic restoration in the spring of 2021.
- Main Hall (Hondo) – Constructed of reinforced concrete. On most days, visitors may offer prayers while viewing a total of seven statues of Yakushi Nyorai (the Medicine Buddha): a central principal image flanked by three statues on each side. Occasionally, sunlight reflects into the hall, illuminating the face of the central principal image.
- Daishi-do (Great Master Hall) – Visitors may view the statue of the Great Master (Kukai).
- Higiri Daishi-do – Enshrines a statue of Kukai said to have been carved by the Master himself, based on his own reflection in a well. It is believed that wishes will be granted if one visits the hall daily for a specific, predetermined number of days.
- Omokage-no-ido (Well of Reflections) – Located inside the Higiri Daishi-do. It is said that if one gazes into the water and sees their own reflection, they will enjoy good health and freedom from illness; however, if no reflection appears, misfortune is said to befall them within three years.
- Goma-do (Hexagonal Hall) – Houses a group of five statues: a standing figure of Fudo Myo-o (Acala) in the center, flanked by the four Wisdom Kings—Daiitoku Myo-o, Kongo-Yasha Myo-o, Gosanze Myo-o, and Gundari Myo-o. *Goma* (fire rituals) are performed here on the 28th of every month.
- Daihi-den – A repository housing a standing statue of the Eleven-faced Kannon Bodhisattva (designated as an Important Cultural Property), as well as statues of Nikko Bodhisattva and Gekko Bodhisattva. It serves as a designated pilgrimage site (Fudasho) for the Awa Saigoku 33 Kannon Pilgrimage.
- Dainichi-do – Newly constructed in 2017. It was built to enshrine a large seated statue of Dainichi Nyorai (Vairocana Buddha) in the *Kongo-kai* (Diamond Realm) style, which had previously been seated in the center of the Komyo-den.
- Benzaiten Shrine
- Komyo-den (Memorial Tablet Hall) – Located between the Main Hall and the Daishi-do. It houses a seated statue of Dainichi Nyorai in the *Taizo-kai* (Womb Realm) style, with a seated statue of Amida Nyorai located on the floor below.
- Shoro (Bell Tower)
- Nokotsudo (Ossuary) – Known by the name "Suzume no Sato" (Village of Sparrows). The ashes of the renowned author Jakucho Setouchi were interred here on May 15, 2022—what would have been her 100th birthday—in accordance with her personal wishes, as she had greatly admired the design of this facility.
- Haiku and Waka Monuments: Mamoru (Note: Mamoru Sano was born in 1901 in Honmachi, Tokushima City. He studied under Shūōshi Mizuhara and became a member of the Ashibi group.) The stone monument inscribed with the verse "Tenmei is sufficient for tying a pilgrim's straw sandals" is located to the left immediately after passing through the Great Gate, while the monument bearing the haiku by Kaisuna—"A walking pilgrim / bears a red backpack; / as we pass, a butterfly takes flight"—stands further to the left.

Upon entering the Niō Gate, a purification pavilion (temizuya) is situated to the left, while the Main Hall stands at the far end directly ahead. The Daishi Hall is located to the right in the foreground, and to the left stands the Higiri Daishi Hall, which houses the "Well of Reflections" (Omokage no Ido). A bell tower stands adjacent to these structures; the Nokyōjo (Pilgrim's Office) is located within the living quarters (kuri) situated behind and to the left of the Higiri Daishi Hall, while the Dainichi Hall is built to the left of that building.

Temple Lodging (Shukubō): None Parking: 30 cars, 5 buses. Free of charge.

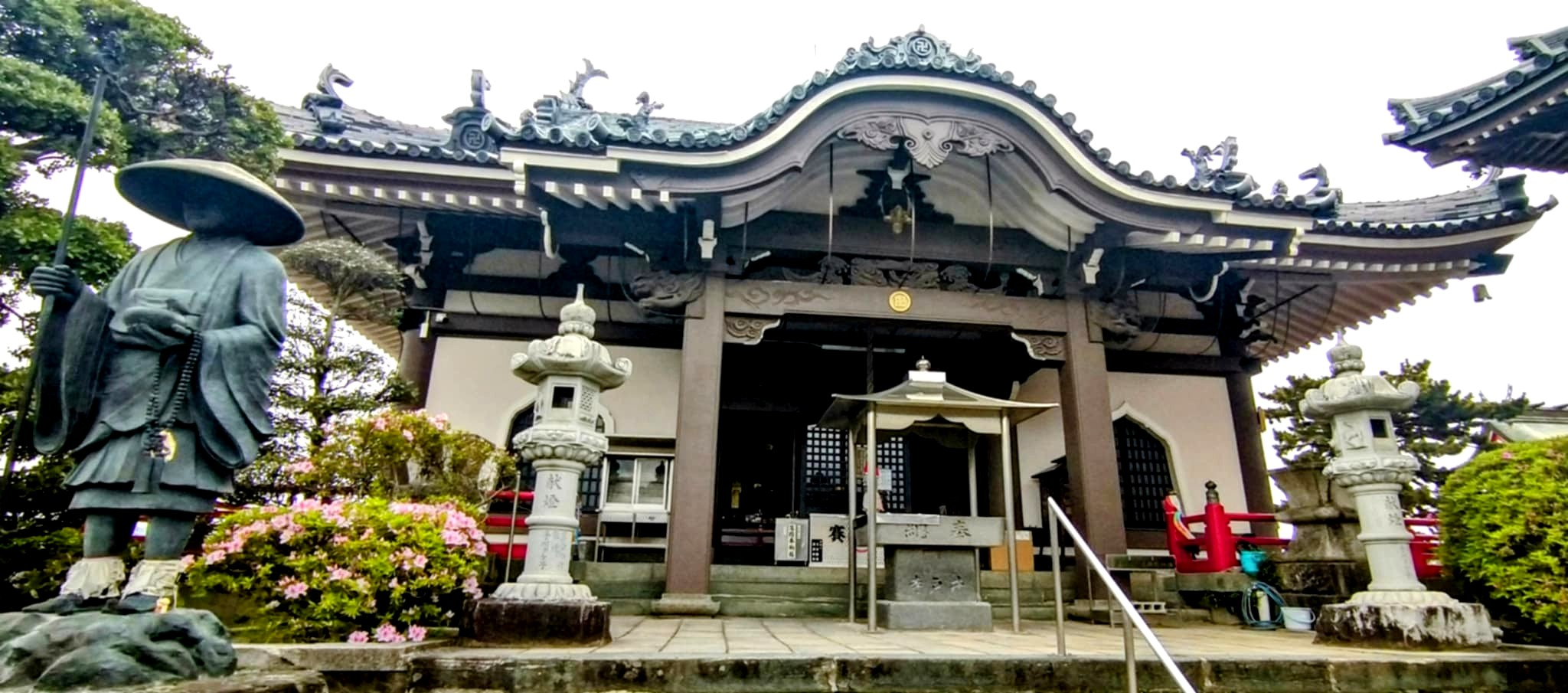
Main Hall (Hondo)

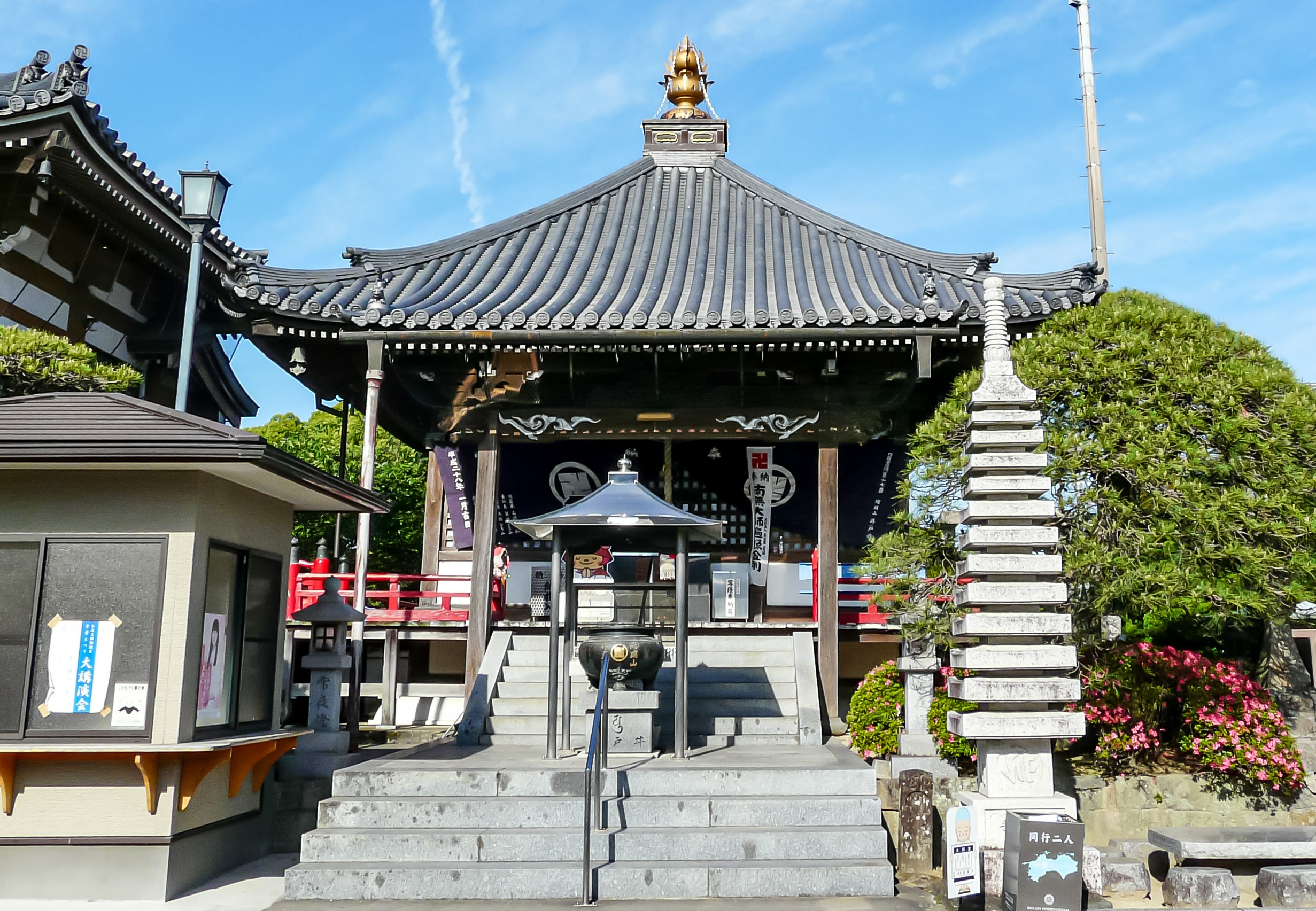
Great Master Hall (Daishi-do)

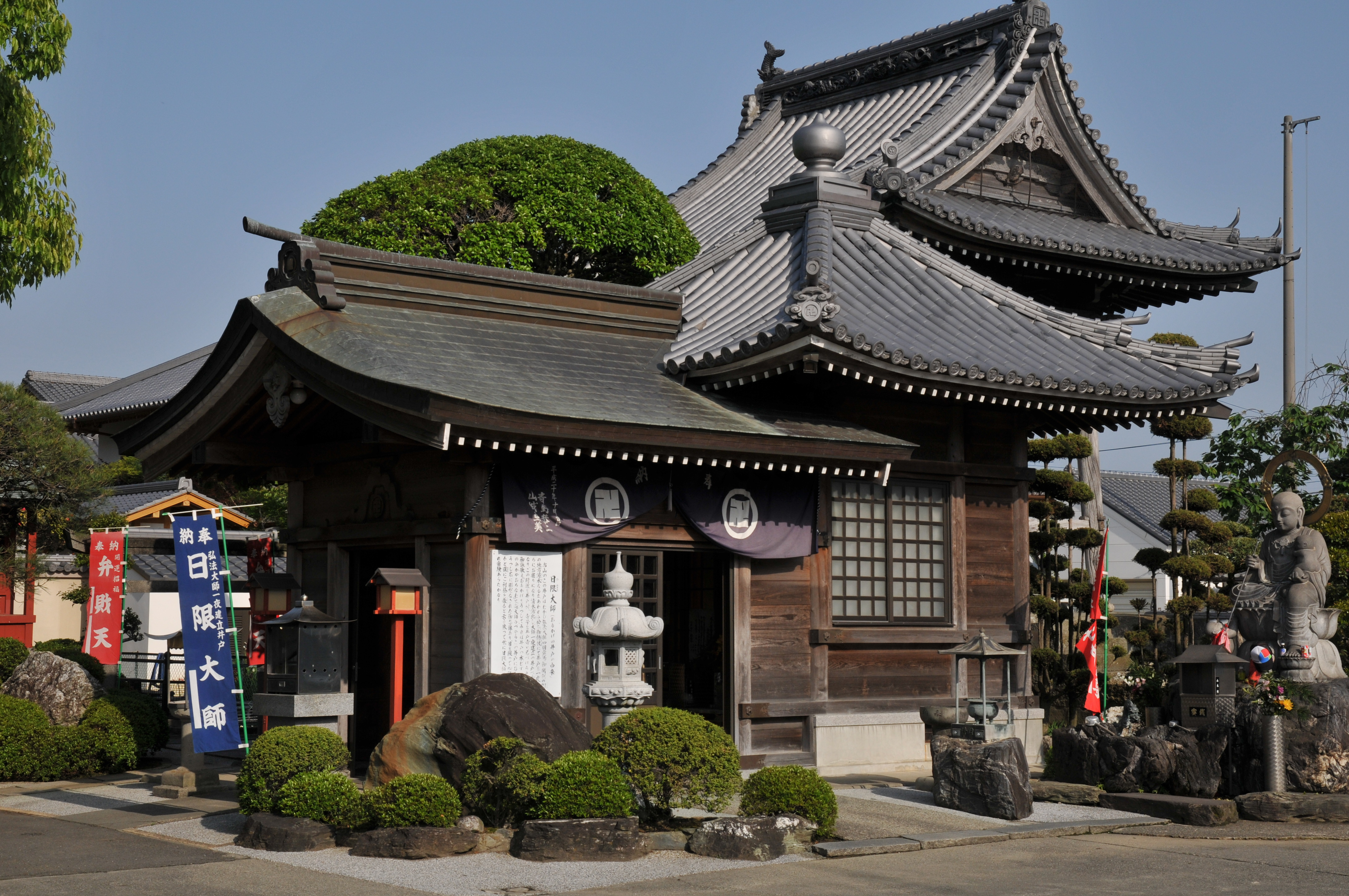
Higiri Daishi-do

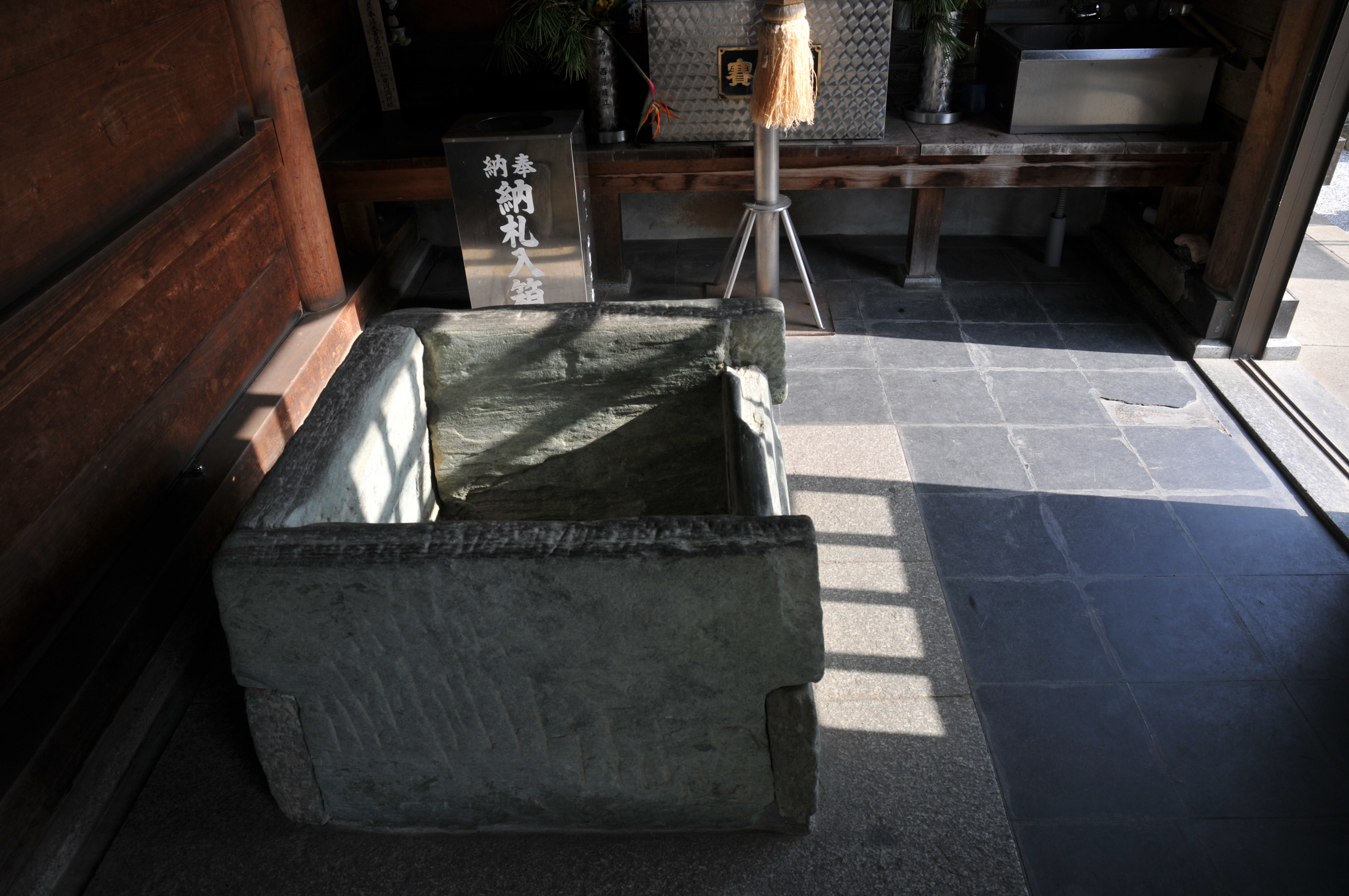
Higiri Daishi-do

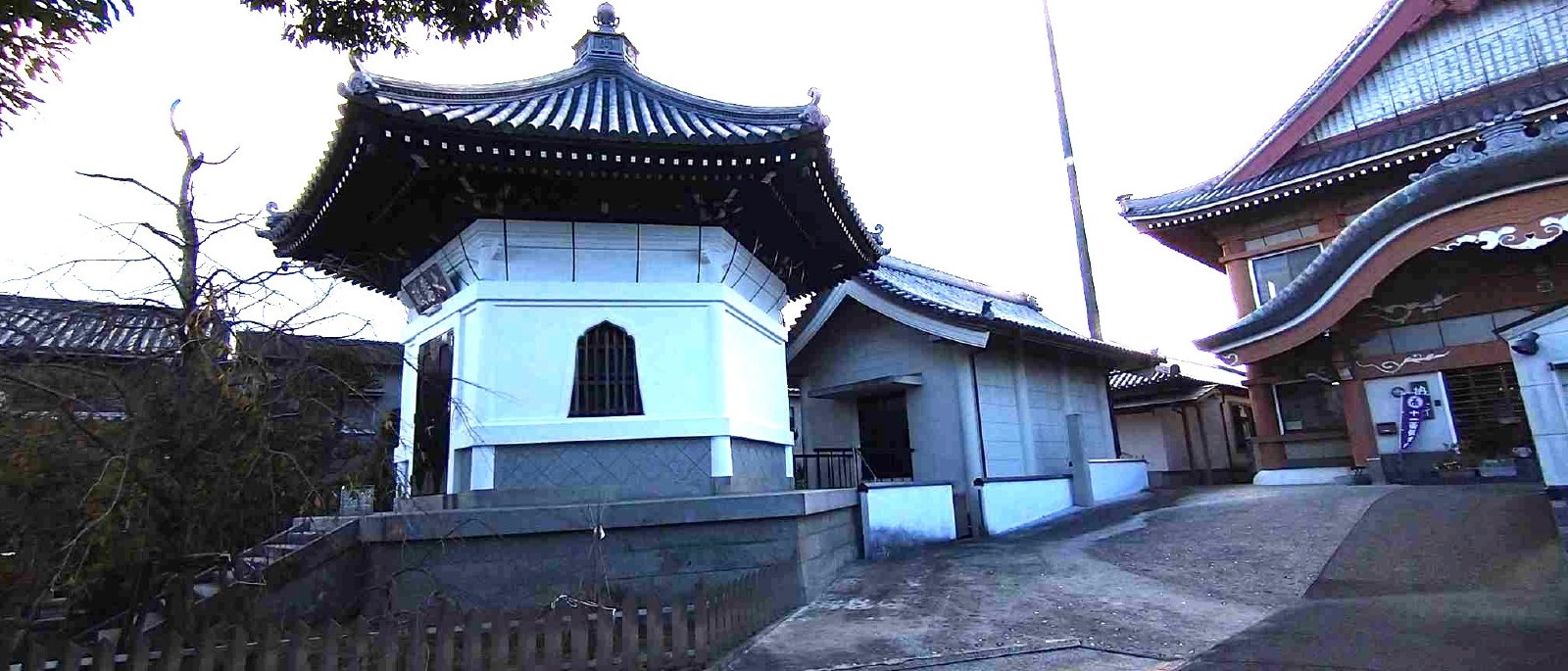
From left: Goma-do, Daihi-den, Dainichi-do, Honbo.

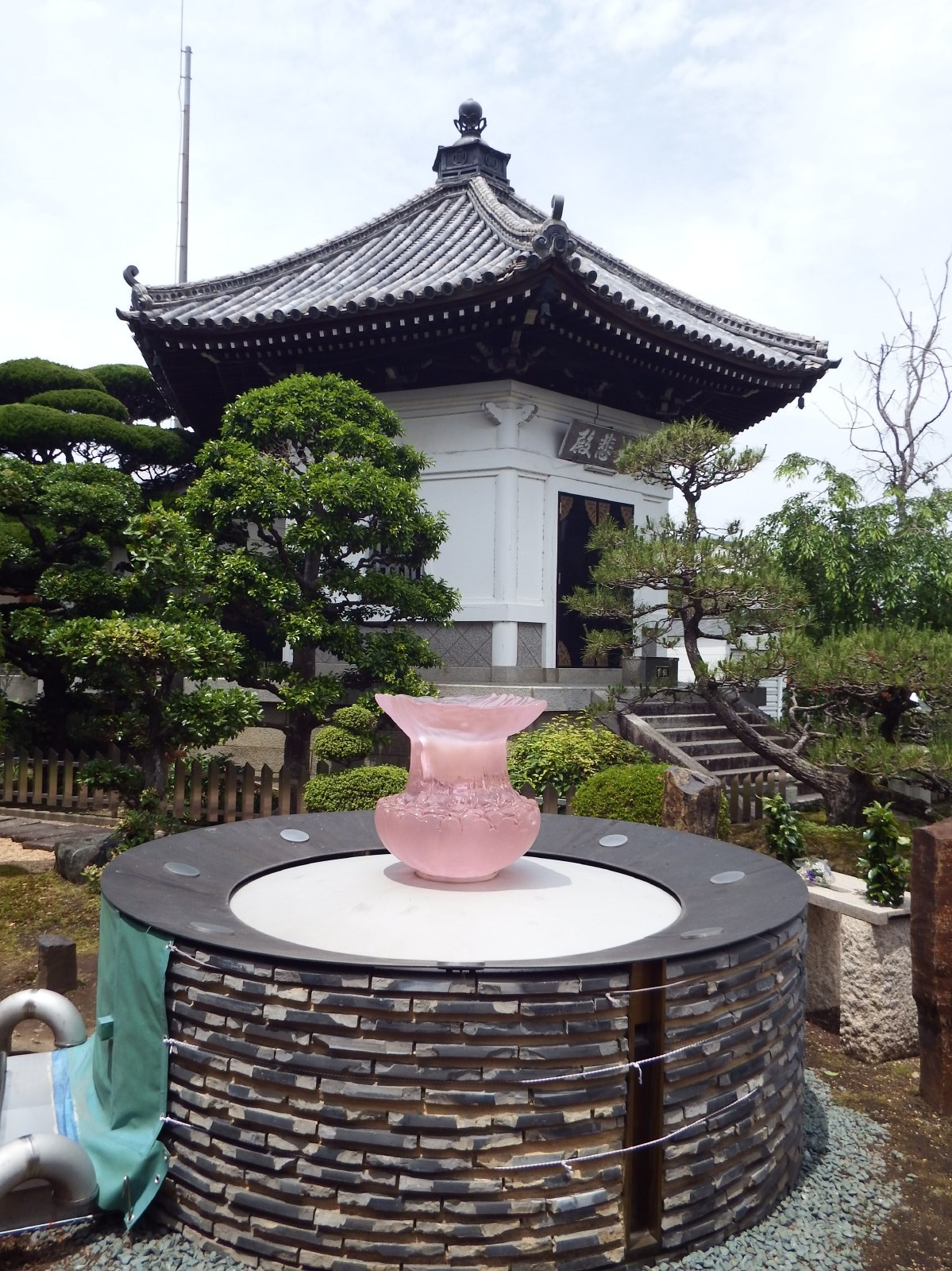
The ossuary and the Goma hall behind it.

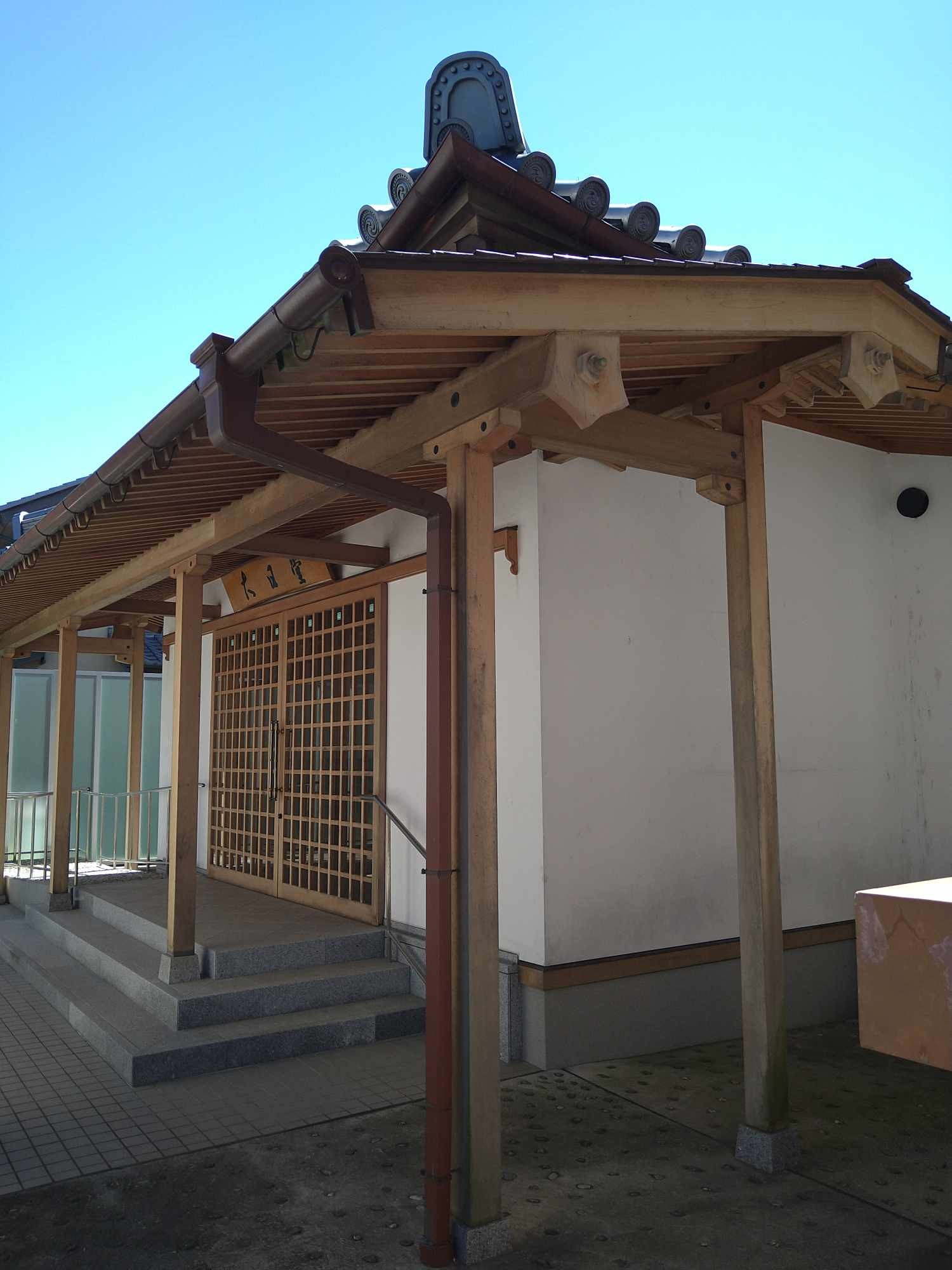
Dainichi-do

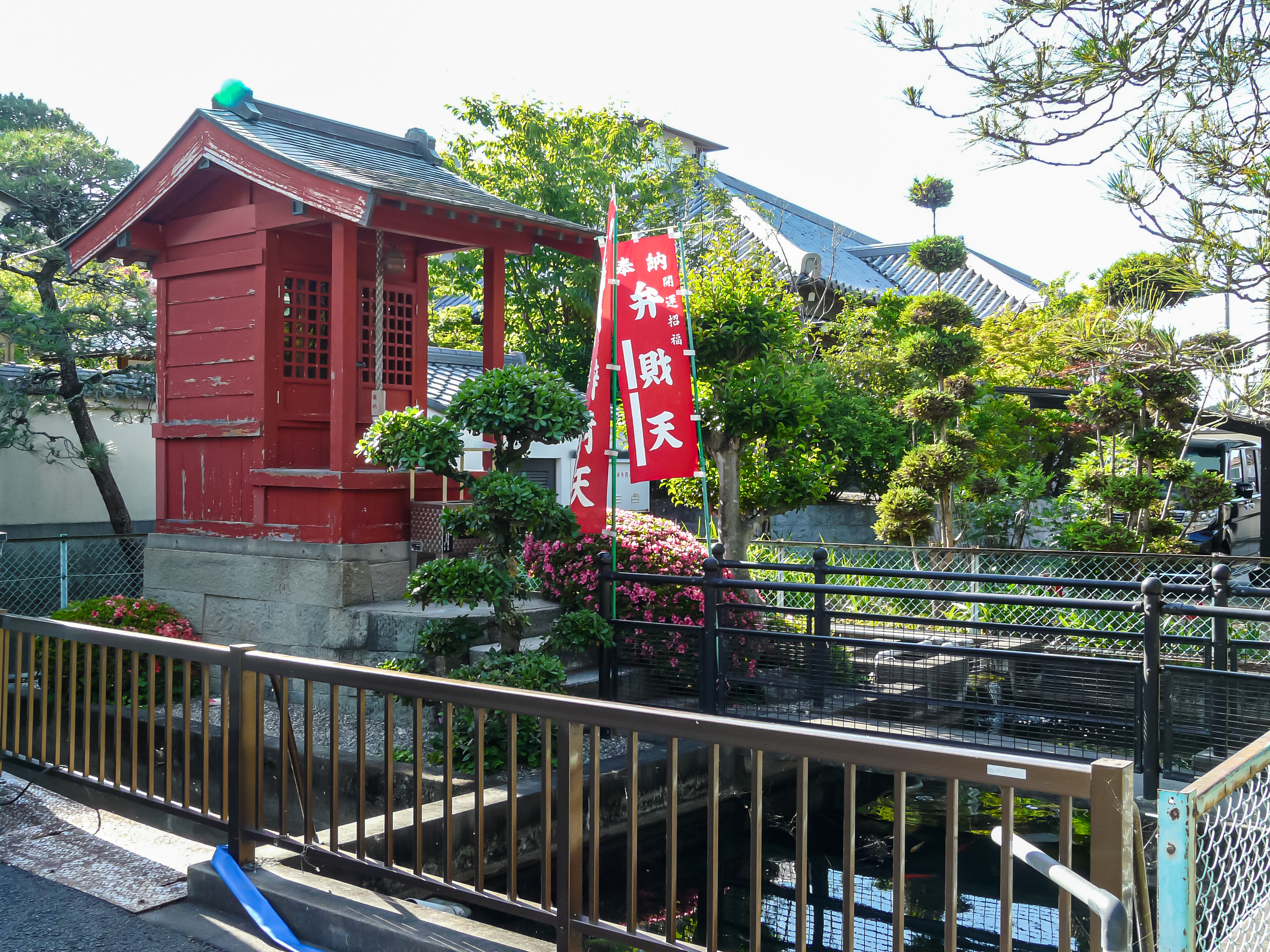
Benzaiten Shrine

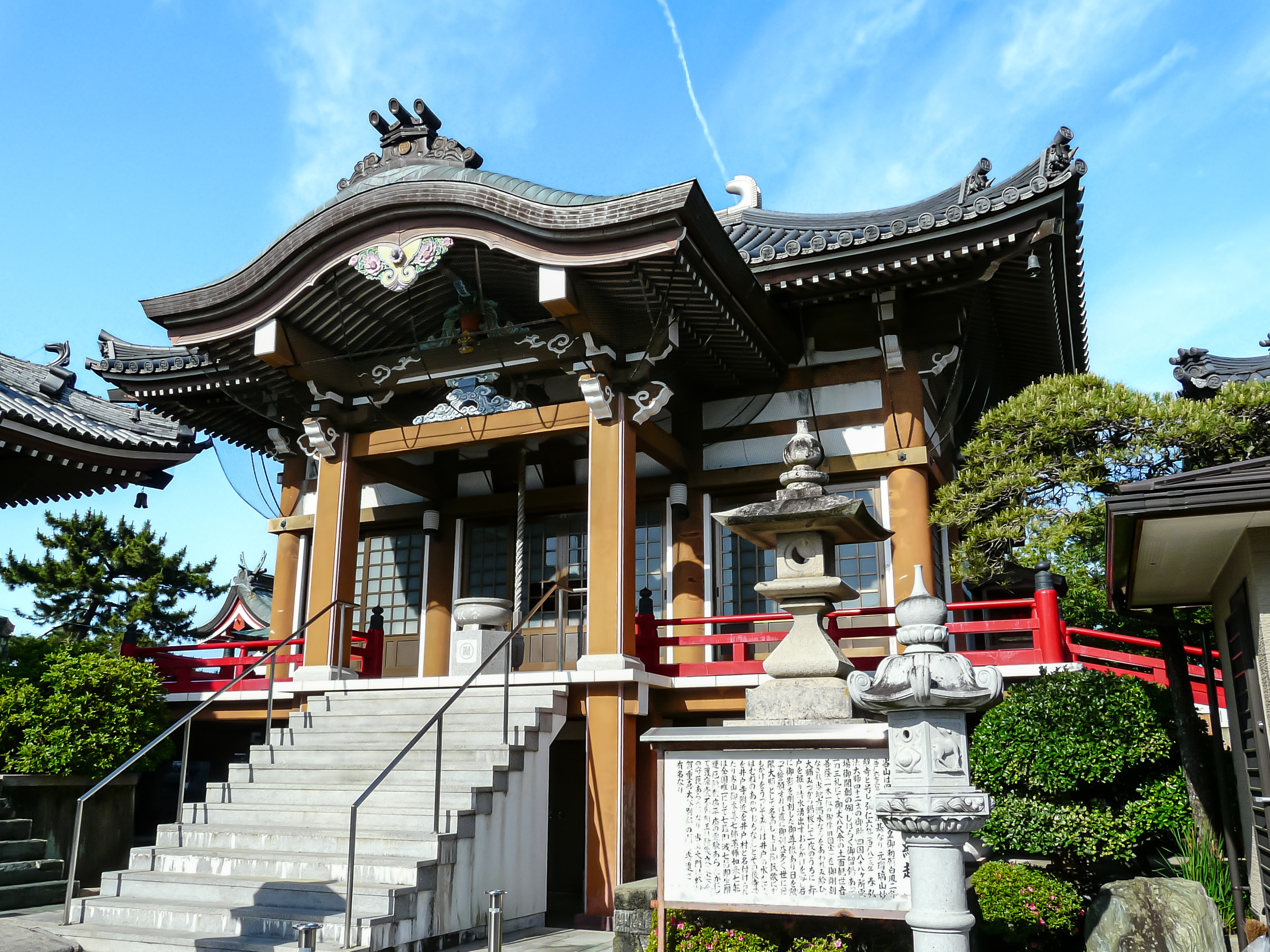
Komyo-den (Memorial Tablet Hall)

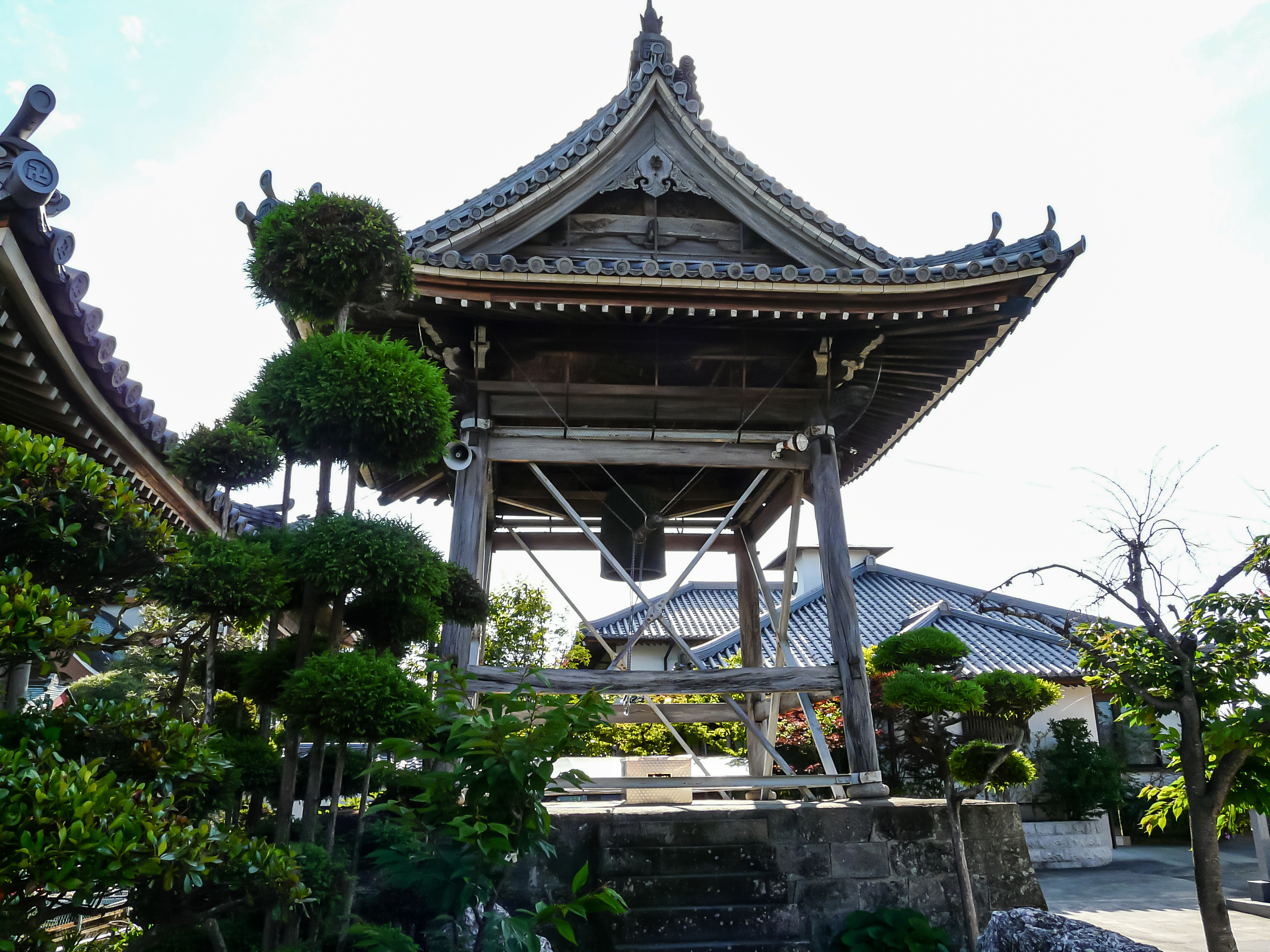
Shoro (Bell Tower)

== Cultural Properties ==
=== Important Cultural Properties ===
- Wooden Standing Statue of the Eleven-faced Kannon: Carved from a single block of kaya wood, polychrome, 197.0 cm; Early Heian Period; Designated August 9, 1911.

=== Tokushima Prefectural Designated Tangible Cultural Property ===
- Standing Statues of the Sun and Moon Bodhisattvas: Flanking deities to the Eleven-faced Kannon mentioned above; designated on July 18, 1958.
- One Hanging Scroll of the Patriarchs of the Shingon School, Ono Lineage: A polychrome painting depicting 25 patriarchs arranged in the order of their succession. Designated on February 10, 2017.

== Transportation Information ==
=== Train ===
- Shikoku Railway Company (JR Shikoku) Tokushima Line – Get off at Fuchu Station (1.5 km)

=== Bus ===
- Tokushima Bus Ryuo Housing Complex Line – Get off at "Rural Environment Improvement Center" (0.3 km)

=== Roads ===
- General Road: Prefectural Road 30, Ido (0.4 km)
- Expressway: Tokushima Expressway Aizumi IC (6.3 km), Takamatsu Expressway Itano IC (9.5 km)

== Additional Sacred Sites in the Vicinity ==
=== Hōkoku-ji Temple ===
Known as "Mine no Yakushi," this site is said to be a sacred ground where Kūkai himself entered the mountains and established Shingon Esoteric Buddhism, recognizing it as a place perfectly attuned to the "Three Mysteries" (Sanmitsu). Its inner sanctuary—Jōgon-ji Temple in Tatari-dani—is associated with a local legend identifying it as the burial site of Prince Shōtoku. Location: 2-3-2 Minamishō-machi, Tokushima City, Tokushima Prefecture (34°4′12.1″N 134°30′53.9″E)

=== Zoshu-in Temple ===
Founded during the Heian period by Shobo Rigen Daishi. It features a rare "Maimai Well"—a unique structure containing a spiral ramp that allows visitors to descend all the way to the bottom of the well. It has been designated a Tokushima City Heritage Site. Location: 3 Miyanomoto, Shibahara, Kokufu-cho, Tokushima City, Tokushima Prefecture（34°5′33.8″N 134°27′46.8″E）

== Preceding and Following Temples ==
=== Shikoku 88 Temple Pilgrimage ===
16 Kannon-ji --(2.8 km)-- 17 Ido-ji --(16.8 km)-- 18 Onzan-ji

- Note: There are multiple routes for the pilgrimage path; the distances listed above are based on the standard route.

=== Awa Saigoku 33 Kannon Pilgrimage (Eastern Region) ===
32 Kannon-ji (Kannonji, Kokufu-cho, Tokushima City) -- 33 Ido-ji—1 Kannon-ji (Semimachi, Tokushima City)

== See also ==
- Shikoku 88 temple pilgrimage

== Bibliography ==
- 四国八十八箇所霊場会 編 『先達教典』 2006年
- 宮崎建樹 著 『四国遍路ひとり歩き同行二人』地図編 へんろみち保存協力会 2007年（第8版）
