= Tatsue Station =

Railway station in Komatsushima, Tokushima Prefecture, Japan

M08 Tatsue Station 立江駅
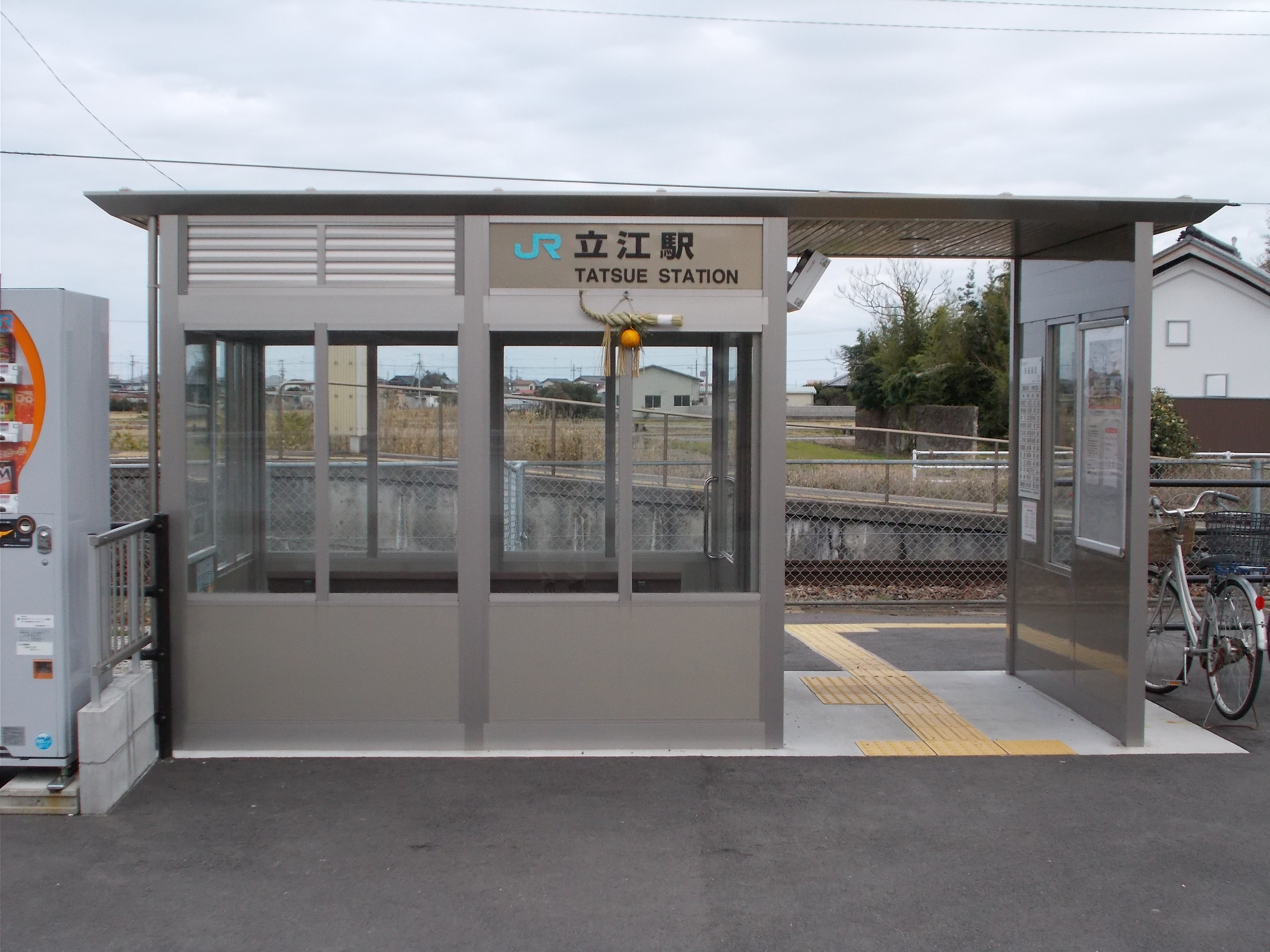
- Tatsue Station in 2019

General information
- Location: Kabuki Tatsuechō, Komatsushima-shi, Tokushima-ken 773-0017; Japan
- Coordinates: 33°58′13″N 134°36′32″E
- Operator: JR Shikoku
- Line: ■ Mugi Line
- Distance: 15.6 km from Tokushima
- Platforms: 1 island platform
- Tracks: 2

Construction
- Structure type: At grade
- Accessible: Yes - island platform accessed by level crossing and ramp

Other information
- Status: Unstaffed
- Station code: M08

History
- Opened: 15 December 1916

Passengers
- FY2019: 224
Location
- Location within Tokushima Prefecture Location within Japan

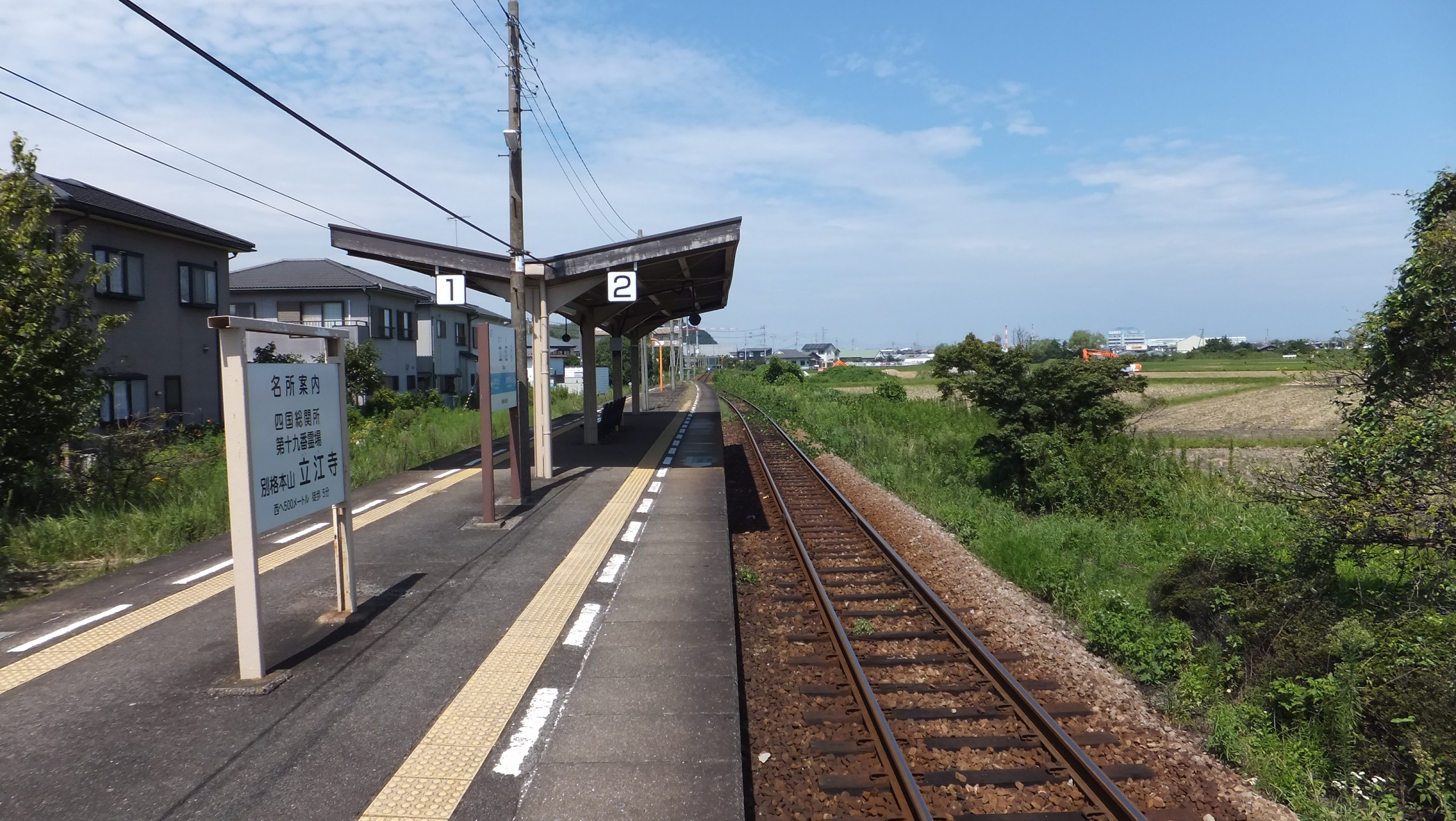
A view of the station platforms and tracks

Tatsue Station (立江駅, Tatsue-eki) is a passenger railway station located in the city of Komatsushima, Tokushima Prefecture, Japan. It is operated by JR Shikoku and has the station number "M08".

== Lines ==
Tatsue Station is served by the Mugi Line and is located 15.6 km from the beginning of the line at Tokushima. All trains stop at this station.

== Layout ==
The station consists of an island platform serving two tracks. The station building is unstaffed and serves only as a waiting room. Access to the island platform is by means of a level crossing and ramp.

=== Platforms ===
1	■ Mugi Line	for Tokushima and Takamatsu
2	■ Mugi Line	for Anan and Mugi

== Adjacent stations ==
«	Service	»
Mugi Line
Awa-Akaishi	Local	Hanoura

== History ==
Tatsue Station was opened on 15 December 1916 as an intermediate station along a stretch of track laid down by the privately run Anan Railway (阿南鉄道, Anan Tetsudo) from Chūden to Hanoura and Furushō (now closed). On 1 July 1936, the stretch of Anan Railway track from Chūden to Hanoura, including Tatsue, was nationalized. Japanese Government Railways (JGR) took over control of the station and operated it as part of the Mugi Line. On 1 April 1987, with the privatization of Japanese National Railways (JNR), the successor of JGR, control of the station passed to JR Shikoku.

== Passenger statistics ==
In fiscal 2019, the station was used by an average of 224 passengers daily.

== Surrounding area ==
- Komatsushima City Tatsue Elementary School
- Komatsushima City Tatsue Public Hall
- Tatsue-ji

== See also ==
- List of railway stations in Japan
