= Awa-Akaishi Station =

Railway station in Komatsushima, Tokushima Prefecture, Japan

M07 Awa-Akaishi Station 阿波赤石駅
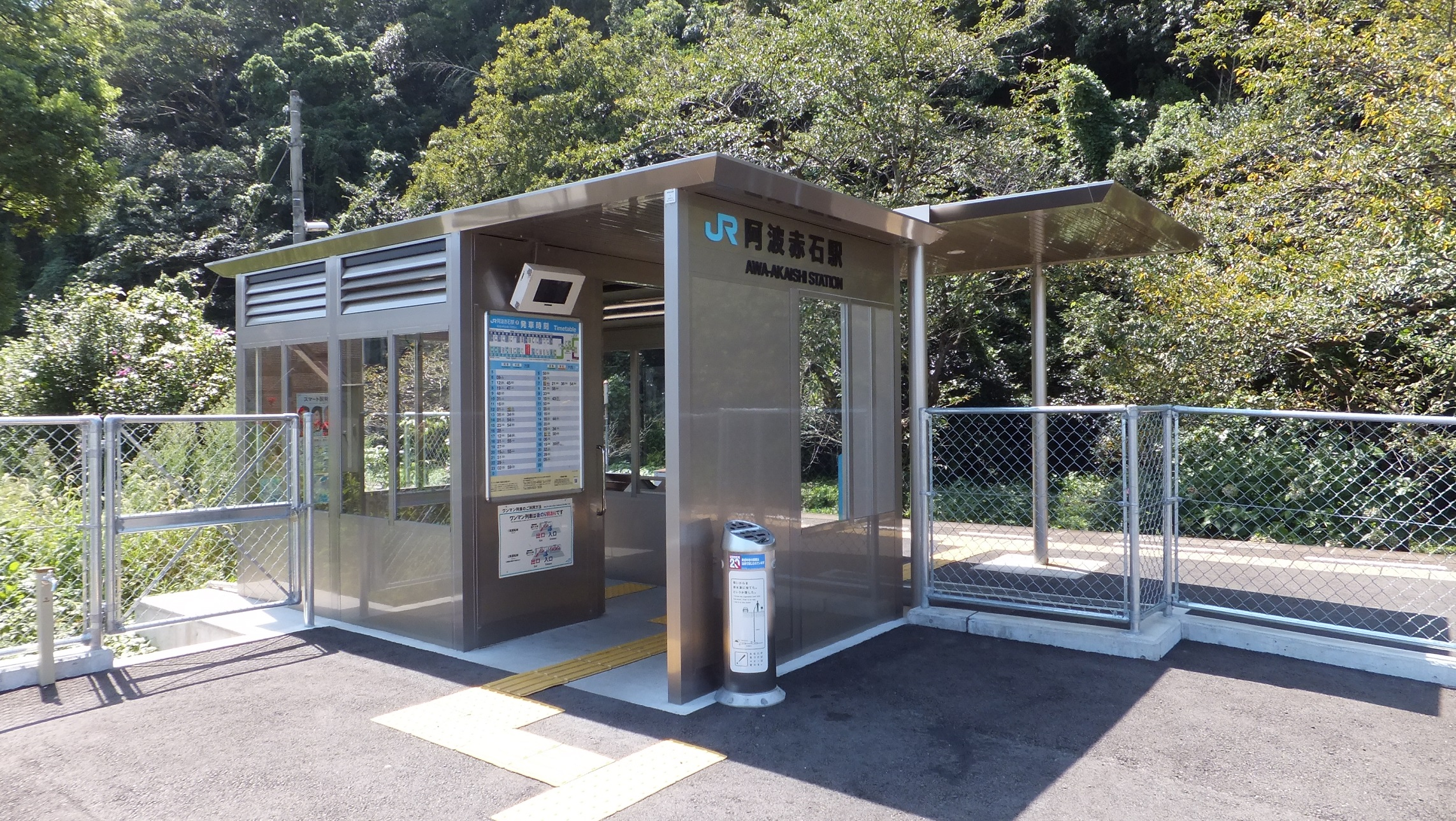
- Awa-Akaishi Station in September 2015

General information
- Location: 3 Akaishichō, Komatsushima-shi, Tokushima-ken 773-0021; Japan
- Coordinates: 33.9817°N 134.6060°E
- Operator: JR Shikoku
- Line: ■ Mugi Line
- Distance: 14.2 km from Tokushima
- Platforms: 1 side platform
- Tracks: 1

Construction
- Structure type: At grade
- Cycle facilities: Bike shed - fee required
- Accessible: Yes - no steps needed to access platform

Other information
- Status: Unstaffed but some types of tickets sold by kan'i itaku agent offsite
- Station code: M07

History
- Opened: 15 December 1916

Passengers
- FY2019: 678
Location
- Location within Tokushima Prefecture Location within Japan

Awa-Akaishi Station (阿波赤石駅, Awa-Akaishi-eki) is a passenger railway station located in the city of Komatsushima, Tokushima Prefecture, Japan. It is operated by JR Shikoku and has the station number "M07".

== Lines ==
Awa-Akaishi Station is served by the Mugi Line and is located 14.2 km from the beginning of the line at Tokushima. All trains stop at this station.

== Layout ==
The station consists of a side platform serving a single track. A simple metal structure in a modern style serves as a waiting room by the platform. A large bike shed is available outside the station but a fee is required for parking. The station is unstaffed but the staff at the shelter managing the bikeshed also sell some kinds of tickets as a kan'i itaku agent.

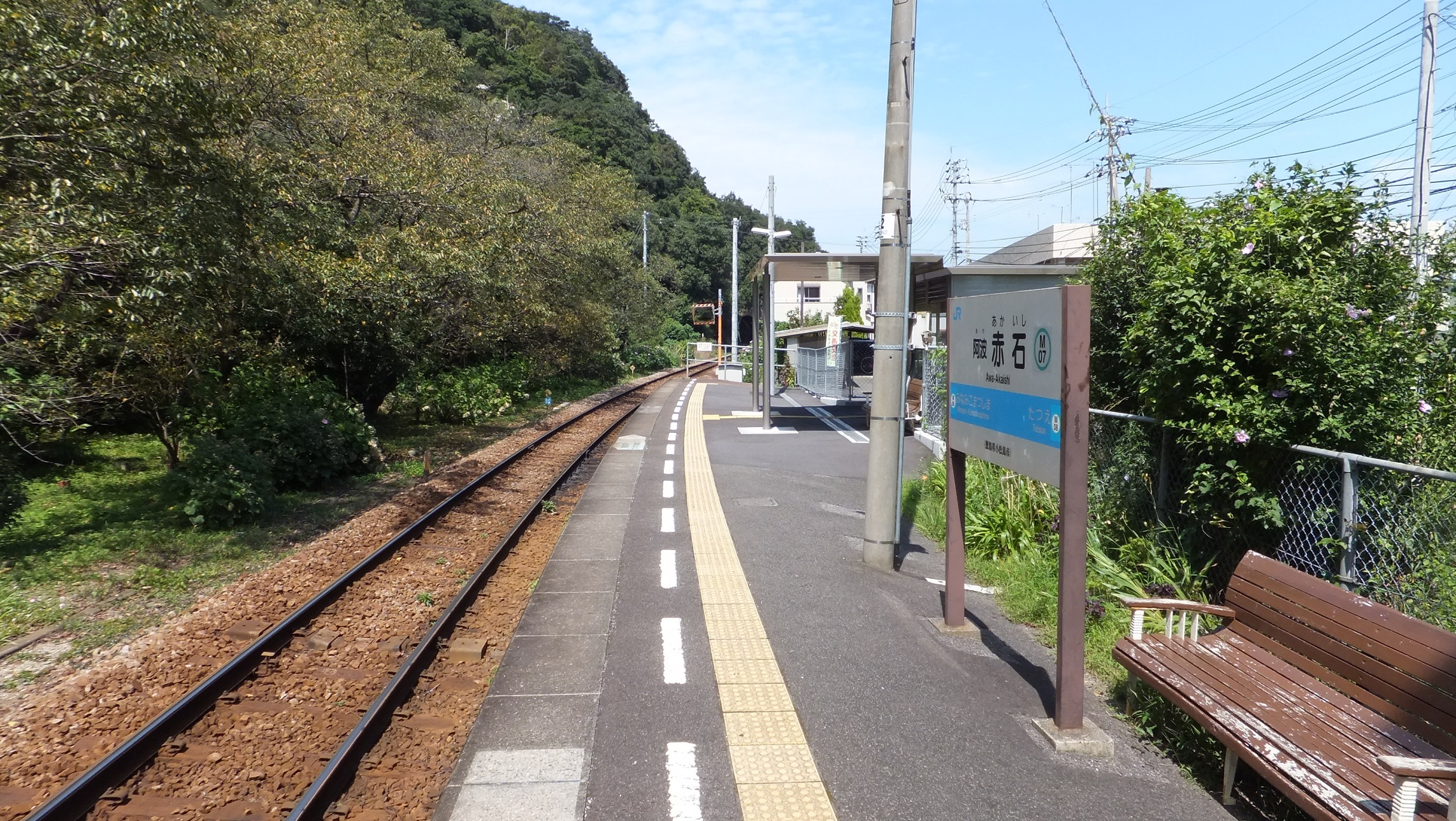
A view of the station platform in 2015.

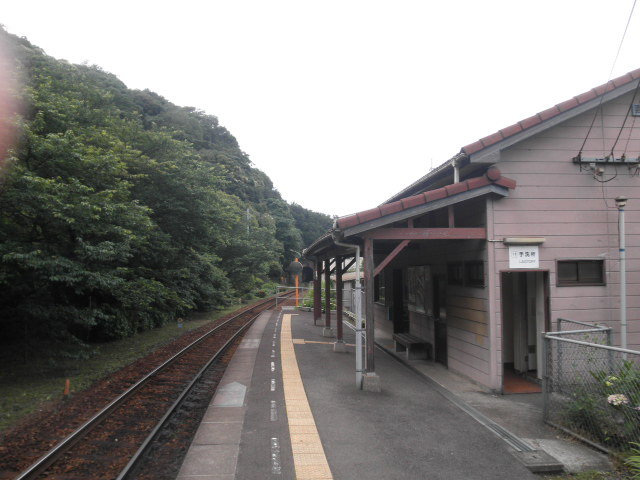
The same view but taken in 2011. This shows the older, wooden station building which has since been replaced by the modern metal structure.

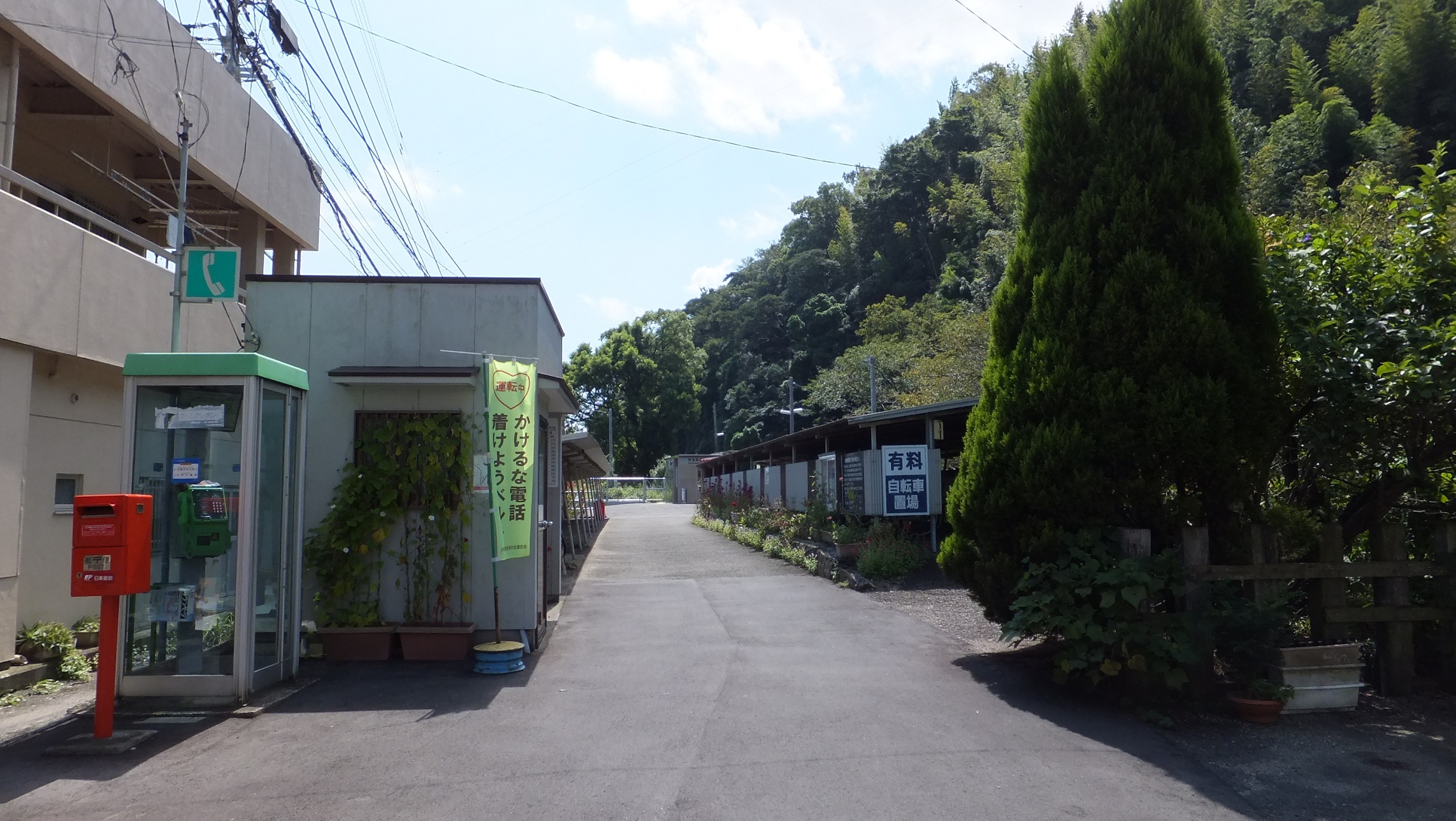
The bike shed near the station. The sign translates as "paid parking for bicycles". The station waiting room can be seen in the distance.

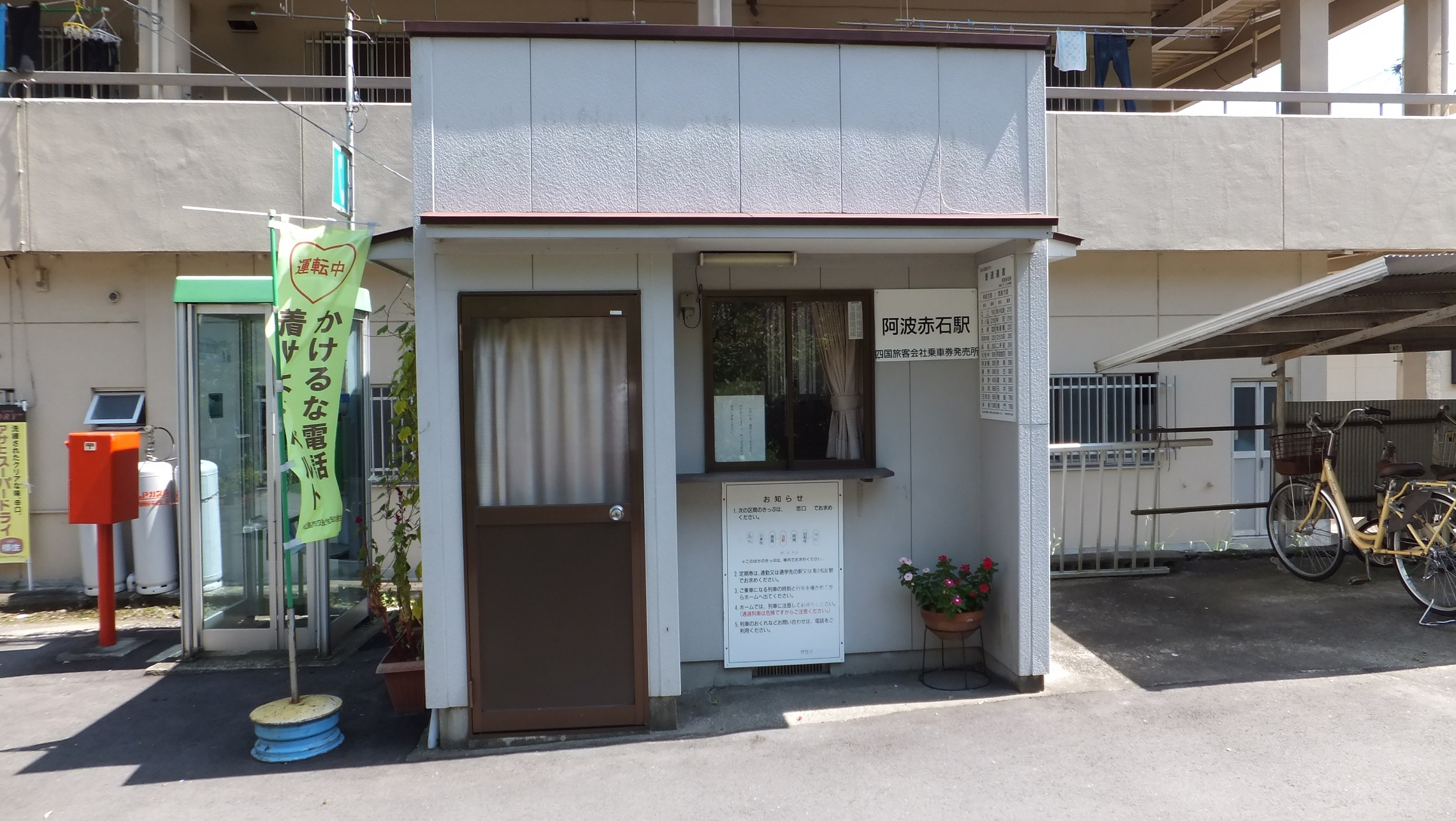
Booth managing the paid bicycle parking shed. The large sign at the top gives the station name and states that JR Shikoku passenger tickets are sold.

== Adjacent stations ==
«	Service	»
Mugi Line
Minami-Komatsushima	Local	Tatsue

== History ==
Awa-Akaishi Station was opened on 15 December 1916 as Akaishi Station. It was then an intermediate station along a stretch of track laid down by the privately run Anan Railway (阿南鉄道, Anan Tetsudo) from Chūden to Hanoura and Furushō (now closed). On 1 July 1936, the Anan Railway was nationalized. Japanese Government Railways (JGR) took over control of the station, renamed it Awa-Akaishi and operated it as part of the Mugi Line. On 1 April 1987, with the privatization of Japanese National Railways (JNR), the successor of JGR, control of the station passed to JR Shikoku.

== Passenger statistics ==
In fiscal 2019, the station was used by an average of 678 passengers daily.

== Surrounding area ==
- Komatsushima City Shinkai Elementary School
- Komatsushima City Komatsushima Minami Junior High School
- JMSDF Komatsushima Air Base

== See also ==
- List of railway stations in Japan
