= Chūden Station =

Railway station in Komatsushima, Tokushima Prefecture, Japan

M05 Chūden Station 中田駅
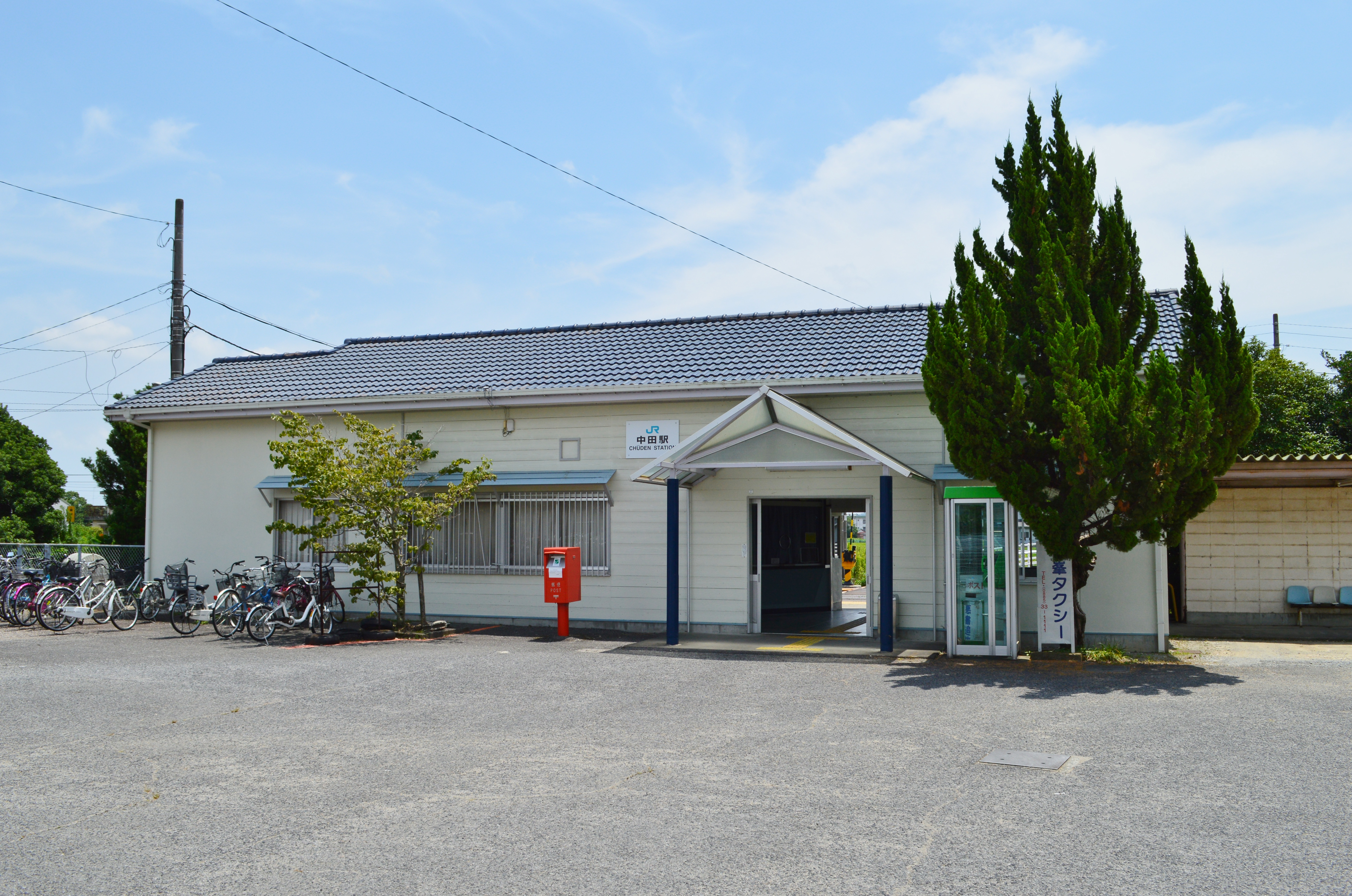
- Chūden Station in July 2016

General information
- Location: Nagate Nakanogōchō, Komatsushima-shi, Tokushima-ken 773-0016
- Coordinates: 34°00′38″N 134°34′11″E
- Operator: JR Shikoku
- Line: ■ Mugi Line
- Distance: 9.2 km from Tokushima
- Platforms: 1 island platform
- Tracks: 2 + 1 passing loop

Construction
- Structure type: At grade
- Accessible: Yes - platform accessed by ramp and level crossing

Other information
- Status: Unstaffed
- Station code: M05

History
- Opened: 15 December 1916

Passengers
- FY2021: 800
Location
- Location within Tokushima Prefecture Location within Japan

Chūden Station (中田駅, Chūden-eki) is a passenger railway station located in the city of Komatsushima, Tokushima Prefecture, Japan. It is operated by JR Shikoku and has the station number "M05".

== Lines ==
Chūden Station is served by the Mugi Line and is located 9.2 km from the beginning of the line at Tokushima. All trains stop at this station.

== Layout ==
The station consists of an island platform serving two tracks. A passing loop runs to the side of track 1 in between the platform and the station building. The station building is unstaffed and serves only as a waiting room. Access to the island platform is by means of a level crossing and ramp.

To the south of the station, the Komatsushima Line once branched off towards the railway facilities at Komatshima Port. At 1.9 km, the Komatsushima Line was the shortest line in the network of Japanese National Railways (JNR). The line was closed in 1985. The old Komatsushima Station and its environs has now been turned into a park where the station building and several steam locomotives are on display.

=== Platforms ===
1	■ Mugi Line	for Anan and Mugi
2	■ Mugi Line	for Tokushima and Takamatsu

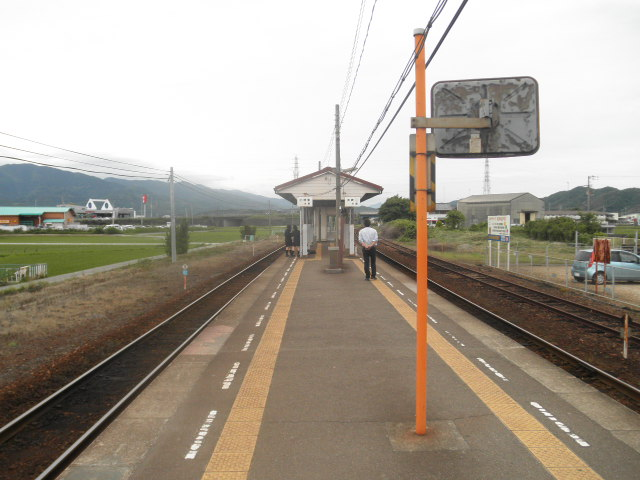
Platforms and tracks of Chūden Station. The passing loop can be seen to the right.

== Adjacent stations ==
«	Service	»
Mugi Line
Jizōbashi	Local	Minami-Komatsushima

== History ==
Chūden Station was opened on 15 December 1916 along a stretch of track laid down in 1913 by the Awa National Joint Steamship Company (阿波国共同汽船, Awa-koku kyōdō kisen) between Tokushima and the port at Komatsushima (where the rail facilities are now closed). This was to serve as a transfer station for a stretch of track built by the Anan Railway (阿南鉄道, Anan Tetsudo) from Chūden to Hanoura and Furushō (now closed).

The Awa Steamship company was nationalized on 1 September 1917, and Japanese Government Railways (JGR) took over control of the station and operated it as part of the Komatsushima Light Railway and later, the Komatsushima Line. On 1 July 1936, the Anan Railway was nationalized and became part of the Mugi Line. On 1 April 1961, the starting point of the Mugi Line was shifted to Tokushima. Chūden now became the starting point of the Komatsushima Line. On 14 March 1985, the Komatsushima Line was closed and Chūden was then served only by the Mugi Line.

On 1 April 1987, with the privatization of Japanese National Railways (JNR), the successor of JGR, JR Shikoku took over control of the station.

== Passenger statistics ==
In fiscal 2021, the station was used by an average of 800 passengers daily.

== Surrounding area ==
- Komatsushima City Chiyo Elementary School
- Tokushima Prefectural Komatsushima Nishi High School

== See also ==
- List of railway stations in Japan
