= Minami-Komatsushima Station =

Railway station in Komatsushima, Tokushima Prefecture, Japan

M06 Minami-Komatsushima Station 南小松島駅
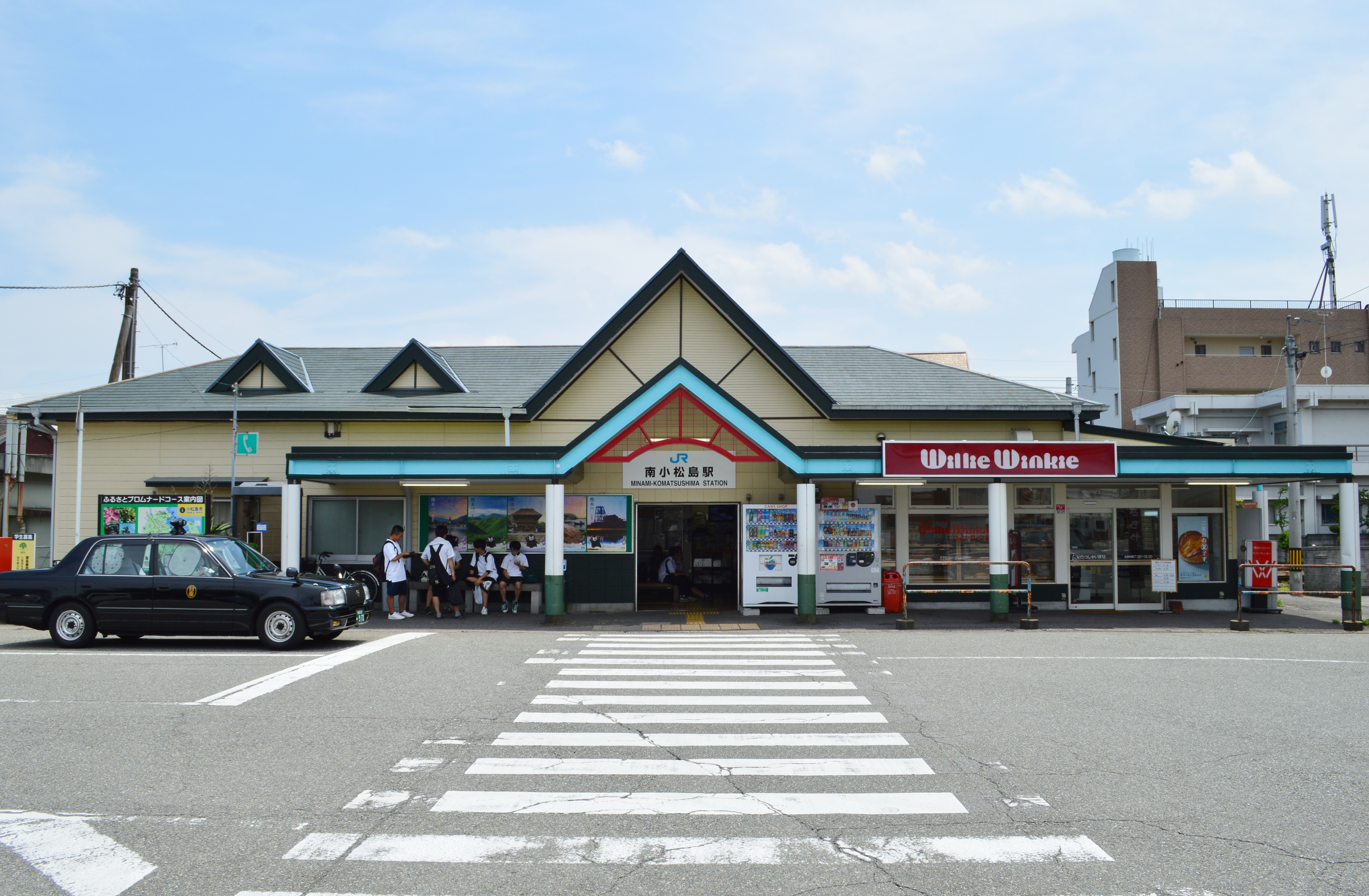
- Minami-Komatsushima Station in July 2016

General information
- Location: 7-43 Minamikomatsushimachō, Komatsushima-shi, Tokushima-ken 773-0005
- Coordinates: 34°0′20.36″N 134°35′13.2″E
- Operator: JR Shikoku
- Line: ■ Mugi Line
- Distance: 10.9 km from Tokushima
- Platforms: 1 island platform
- Tracks: 2

Construction
- Structure type: At grade
- Cycle facilities: Designated parking area for bicycles
- Accessible: Yes - platform accessed by ramp and level crossing

Other information
- Status: Staffed - JR ticket window
- Station code: M06

History
- Opened: 15 December 1916

Passengers
- FY2019: 1862
Location
- Location within Tokushima Prefecture Location within Japan

Minami-Komatsushima Station (南小松島駅, Minami-Komatsushima-eki) is a passenger railway station located in the city of Komatsushima, Tokushima Prefecture, Japan. It is operated by JR Shikoku and has the station number "M06".

== Lines ==
Minami-Komatsushima is served by the Mugi Line and is located 10.9 km from the beginning of the line at Tokushima. As of the Muroto limited express' discontinuation in March 2025, only local trains service the line. As a result, all trains stop at this station.

== Layout ==
The station consists of an island platform serving two tracks. The station building houses a waiting room and a JR ticket window (without a Midori no Madoguchi facility). Access to the island platform is by means of a level crossing and ramp. There is a designated parking area for bicycles outside the station building.

=== Platforms ===
1	■ Mugi Line	for Anan and Mugi
2	■ Mugi Line	for Tokushima and Takamatsu

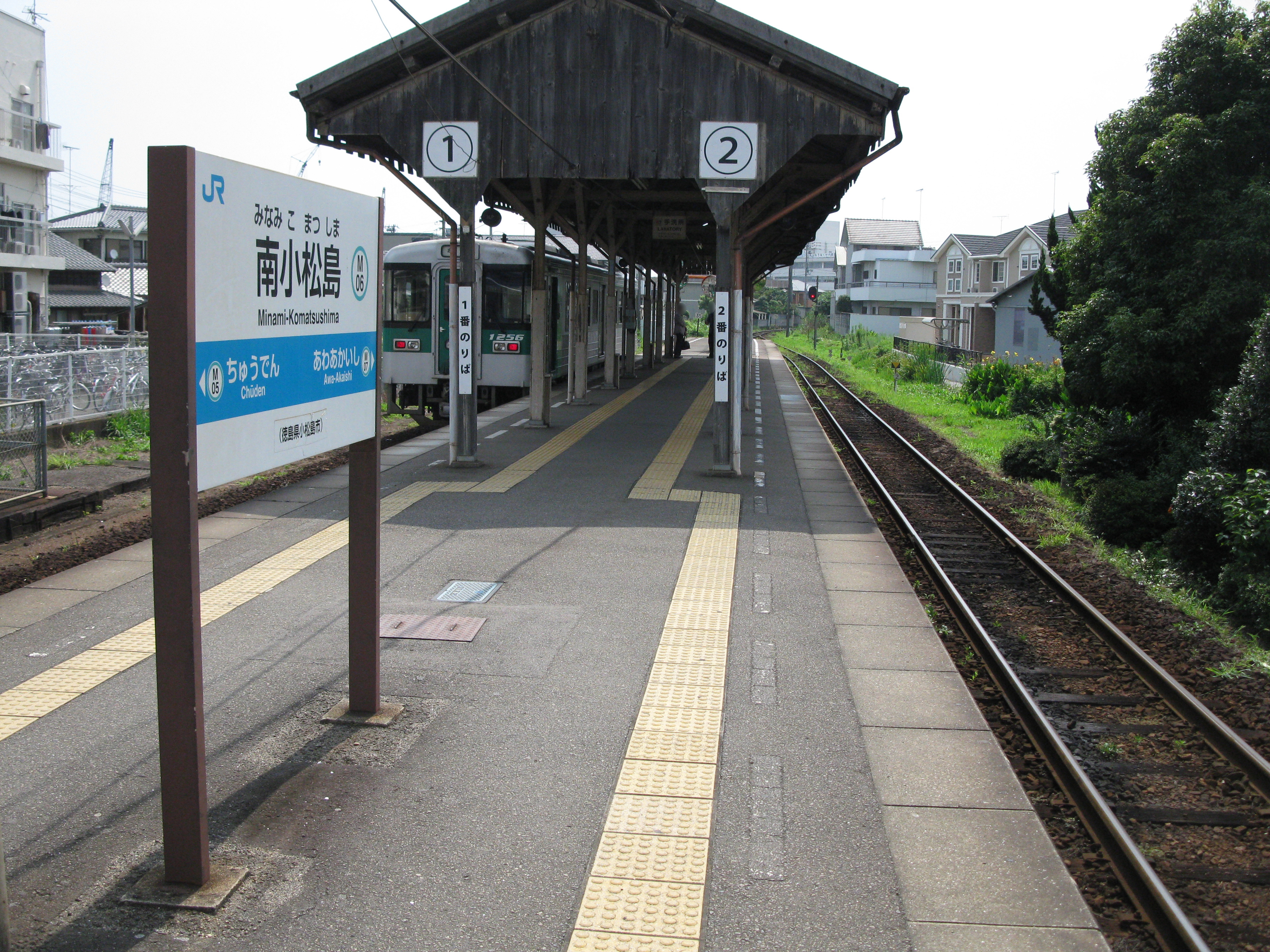
Platforms and tracks of Minami-Komatsushima Station.

== Adjacent stations ==
«	Service	»
Mugi Line
Chūden	Local	Awa-Akaishi

== History ==
Minami-Komatsushima Station was opened on 15 December 1916 as an intermediate station along a stretch of track laid down by the privately run Anan Railway (阿南鉄道, Anan Tetsudo) from Chūden to Hanoura and Furushō (now closed). On 1 July 1936, the Anan Railway was nationalized and became part of the Mugi Line, operated by Japanese Government Railways (JGR). On 1 April 1987, with the privatization of Japanese National Railways (JNR), the successor of JGR, JR Shikoku took over control of the station.

On 1 February 2012, Komatsushima City set up a tourist information centre on the premises of the station.

== Passenger statistics ==
In fiscal 2019, the station was used by an average of 1862 passengers daily.

== Surrounding area ==
- Komatsushima City Hall
- Komatsushima City Health Center
- Komatsushima City Minami Komatsushima Elementary School
- Tokushima Prefectural Komatsushima High School

== See also ==
- List of railway stations in Japan
