= Onzan-ji =

Coordinates: 33°59′9.6″N 134°34′41.7″E

Onzan-ji (Onzan Temple) (Japanese: 恩山寺) is a Koyasan Shingon temple in Komatsushima, Tokushima Prefecture, Japan. Temple # 18 on the Shikoku 88 temple pilgrimage, the main image is of Yakushi Nyorai (Bhaiṣajyaguru: "King of Medicine Master and Lapis Lazuli Light").

== History ==
- The temple was constructed during Emperor Shōmu's reign.
- In the Tenshō (天正, 1573–1592) era, the temple was destroyed by fire during Chōsokabe Motochika (長宗我部 元親) force.
- In the Edo era, the temple was rebuilt with the support of Hachisuka clan (蜂須賀氏).
- In the Bunsei (文政, 1804–1830) era, current buildings were constructed.

== Cultural Properties ==
The temple was designated Prefectural Cultural Properties in 1954.

== See also ==
- Shikoku 88 temple pilgrimage
