= Tatsue-ji (Komatsushima) =

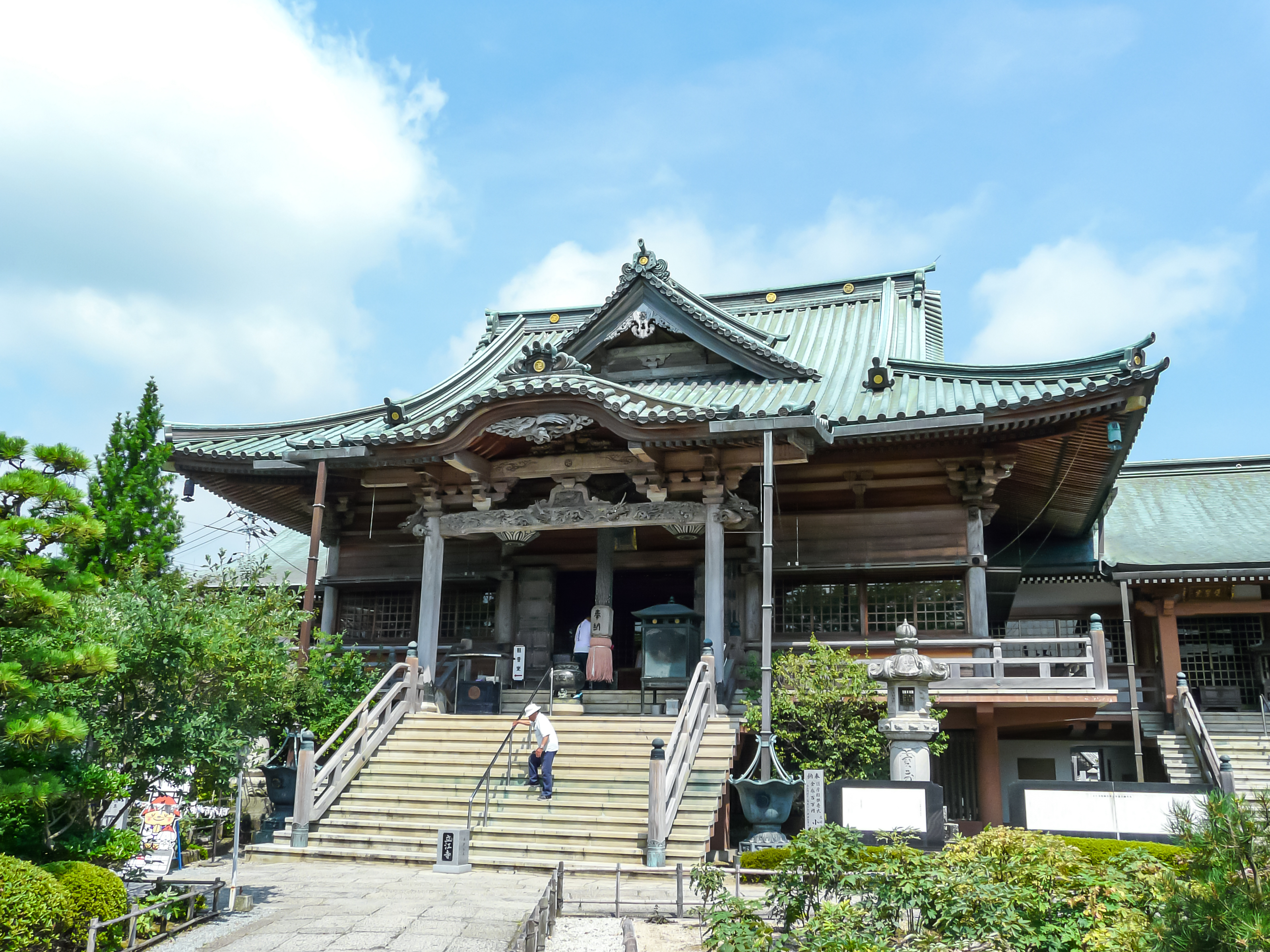

Tatsue-ji (Tatsue Temple) (Japanese: 立江寺) is a Koyasan Shingon temple in Komatsushima, Tokushima Prefecture, Japan. It is Temple # 19 on the Shikoku 88 temple pilgrimage. The main image is of Jizō Bosatsu (Ksitigarbha Bodhisattva).

== History ==
- The temple was constructed during Emperor Shōmu's reign.
- In the Tenshō (天正) era, the temple was destroyed by fire Chōsokabe Motochika (長宗我部 元親) force, but the main statue was not damaged
- In the Edo era, the temple was rebuilt with the support of Hachisuka clan (蜂須賀氏)
- In 1974, the main hall was burnt, but the main statue was not damaged. The hall was rebuilt in 1977

== See also ==
- Shikoku 88 temple pilgrimage
