= Chikuwa =

Japanese fishcake

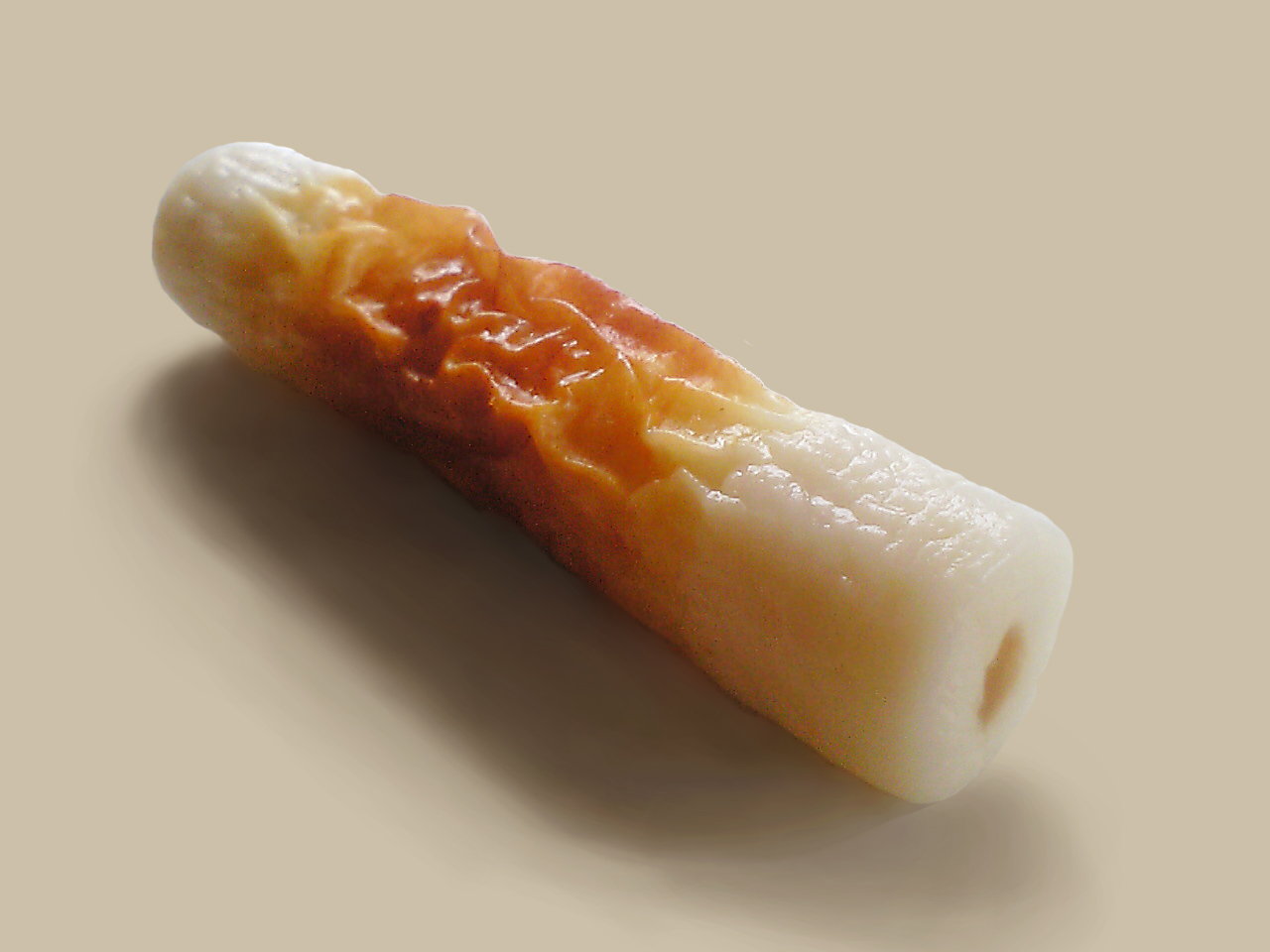
- Typical chikuwa
- Place of origin: Japan
- Associated cuisine: Japanese cuisine
- Main ingredients: Surimi

Chikuwa (竹輪) is a Japanese fishcake product made from fish surimi. After being mixed well, they are wrapped around a bamboo or metal stick and steamed or broiled. The word chikuwa ("bamboo ring") comes from the shape when it is sliced.

Variants of surimi products such as kamaboko and satsuma-age are popular. In Tottori, the per-household consumption has been the highest of all prefectures for the past 30 years, since the first year such records were kept. As it is cheap and a relatively low-fat source of protein, chikuwa is popular as a snack.

Chikuwa should not be confused with chikuwabu, which is an altogether different food product.

There exists a ryakuji kanji for chikuwa, "" which is known for its unusual double-ring shape.

== Composition ==
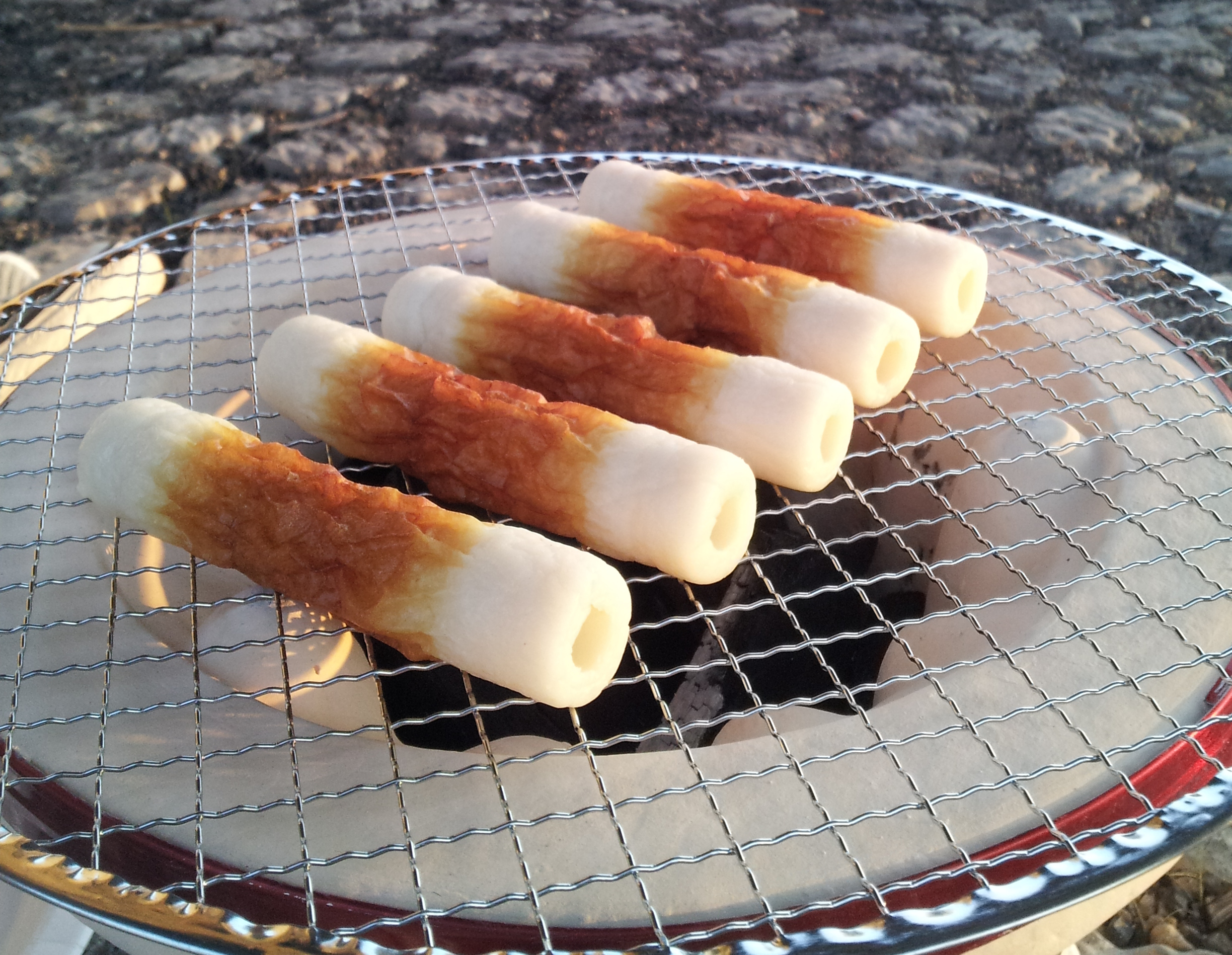
Chikuwa on a shichirin grill

Chikuwa is made of surimi, or ground white fish. Some species used include:

- Alaska pollock (Theragra chalcogramma)
- Various shark species (Selachimorpha)
- Various flying fish species (Exocoetidae)
- Okhotsk atka mackerel (Pleurogrammus azonus)
- Golden threadfin bream (Nemipterus virgatus)
- Black bass
  - Smallmouth bass (Micropterus dolomieu)
  - Largemouth bass (Micropterus salmoides)
  - Florida black bass (Micropterus floridanus)

== Use ==
Chikuwa can be eaten as-is. It is also often used as an ingredient for nimono like oden, chikuzenni, chirashizushi, udon, yakisoba, yasai-itame (vegetable stir-fry), and Japanese curry.

== Regional variation ==
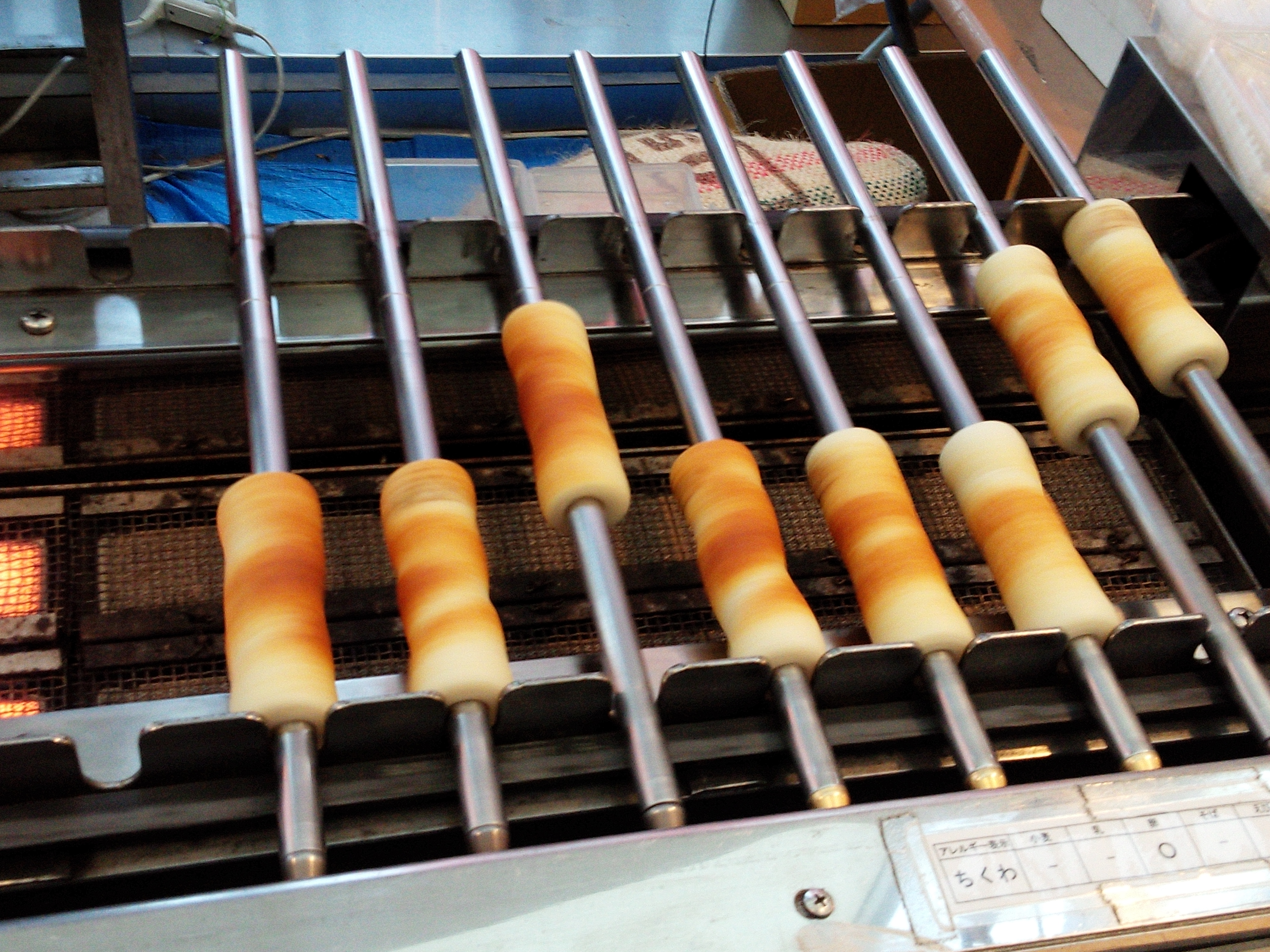
Chikuwa being made on a machine

There are several regional varieties. In the east part of Tottori and part of Nagasaki, tofu chikuwa is produced that adds tofu to surimi. Often, firm tofu is the preferred selection.

In Yawatahama, Ehime, kawa-chikuwa (literally skin chikuwa) is produced: fish skin is wrapped around the skewers and broiled. This is a by-product of regular chikuwa, however, texture and taste are different.

In Shikokuchūō, Ehime, there is ebi-chikuwa, which contains shrimp paste in surimi.

In Komatsushima, Tokushima, there is take chikuwa (literally bamboo chikuwa), which remains on the bamboo after it is broiled.

Australian sushi restaurants may stuff the hollow with cheese (processed or soft ones like Brie) and deep-fry them in tempura batter.

In Thailand, chikuwa is known as pla muek lot (Thai: ปลาหมึกหลอด, lit. 'tube squid'). Despite the name, it is not made from squid.

== Gallery ==
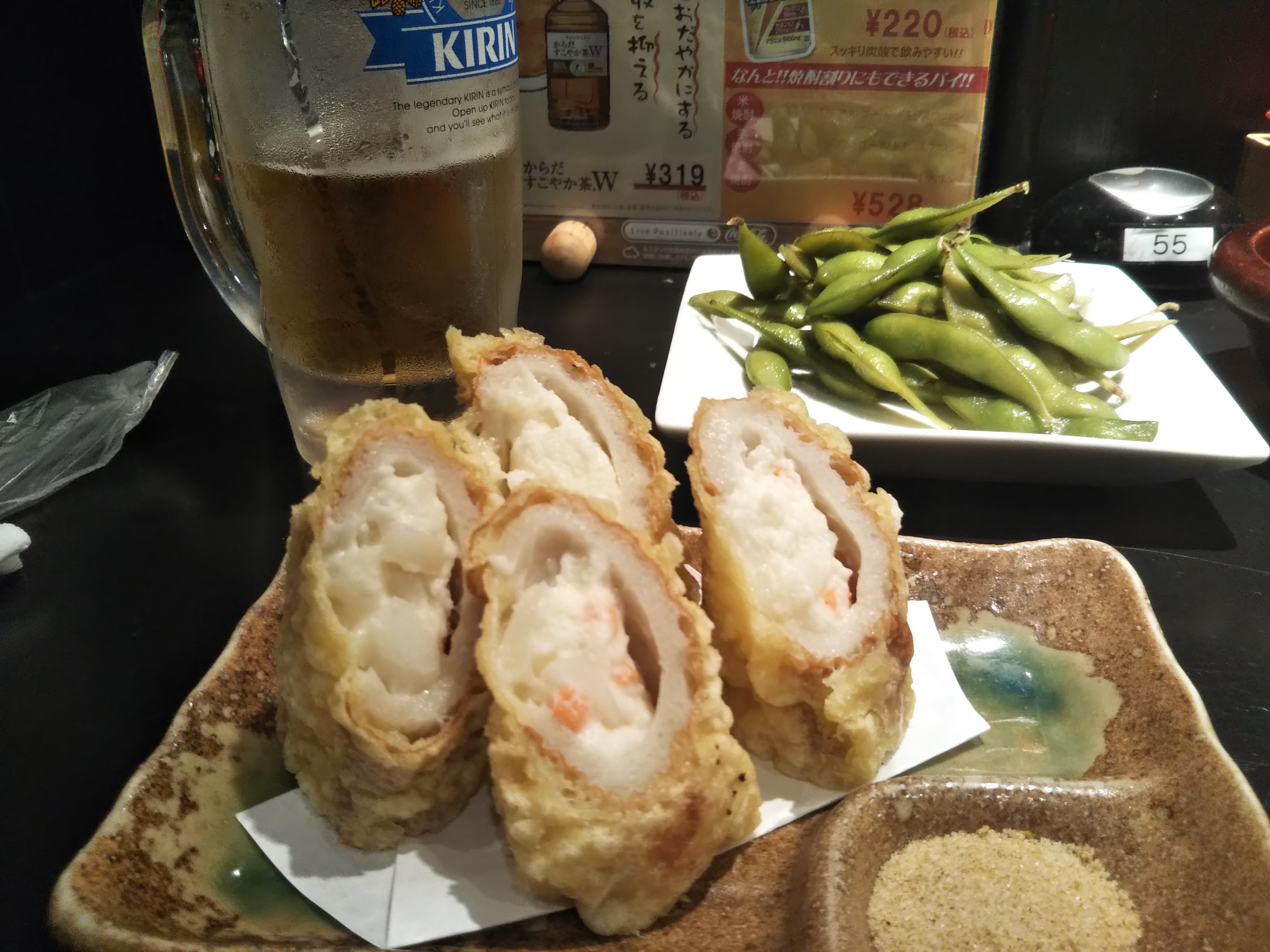
Served at an izakaya

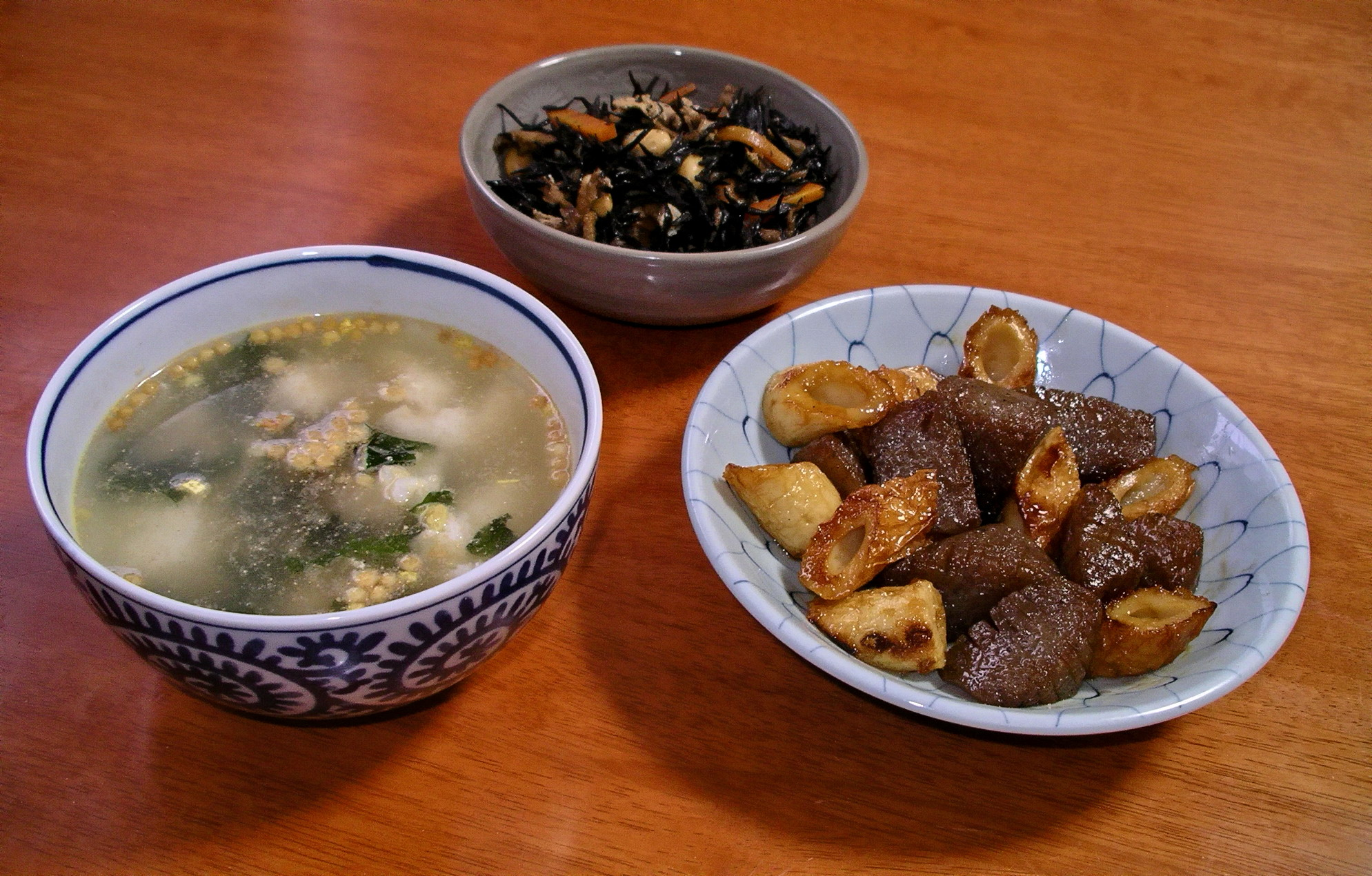
Simmered chikuwa with a bowl of ochazuke, and hijiki seaweed

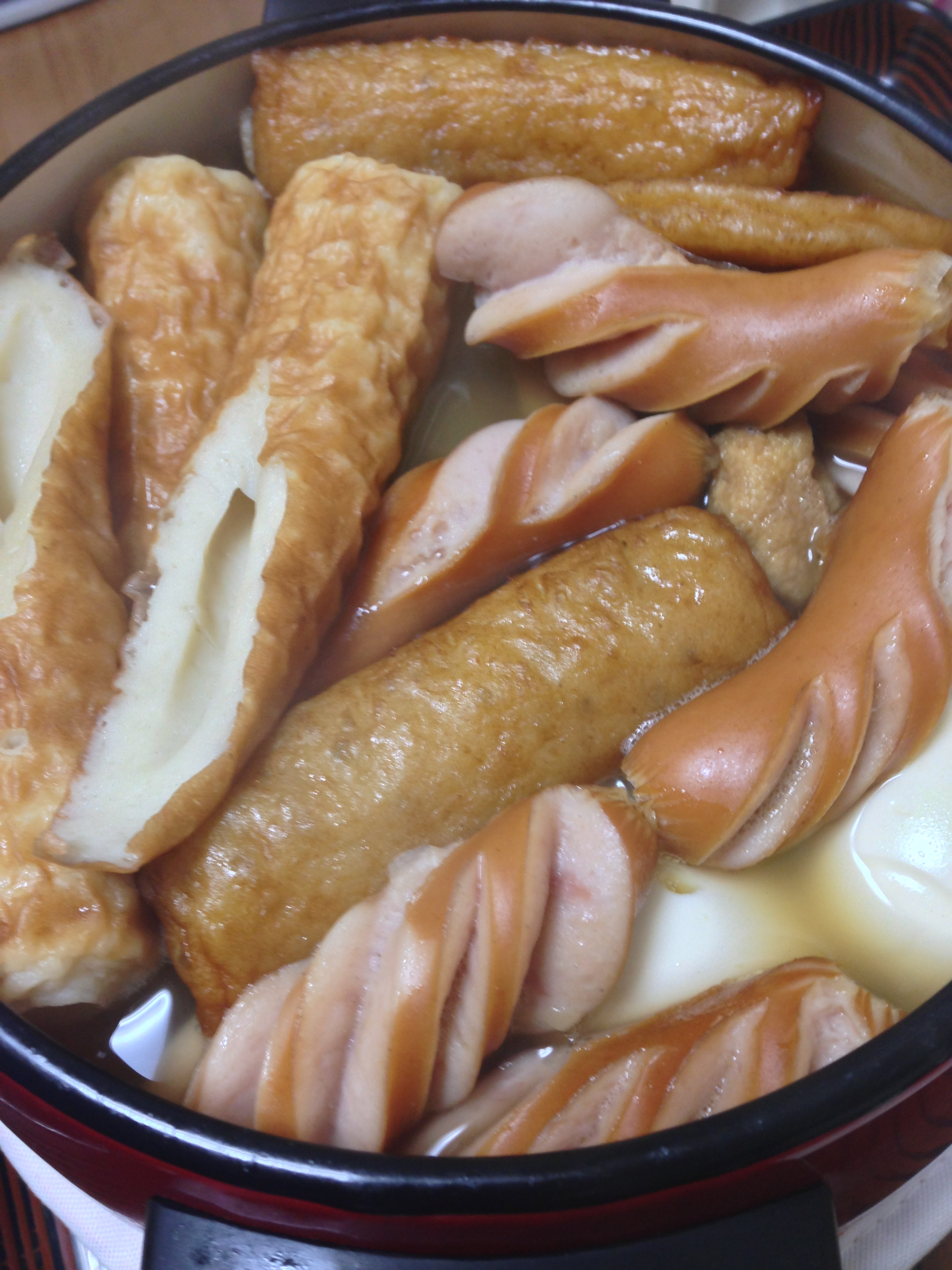
In oden

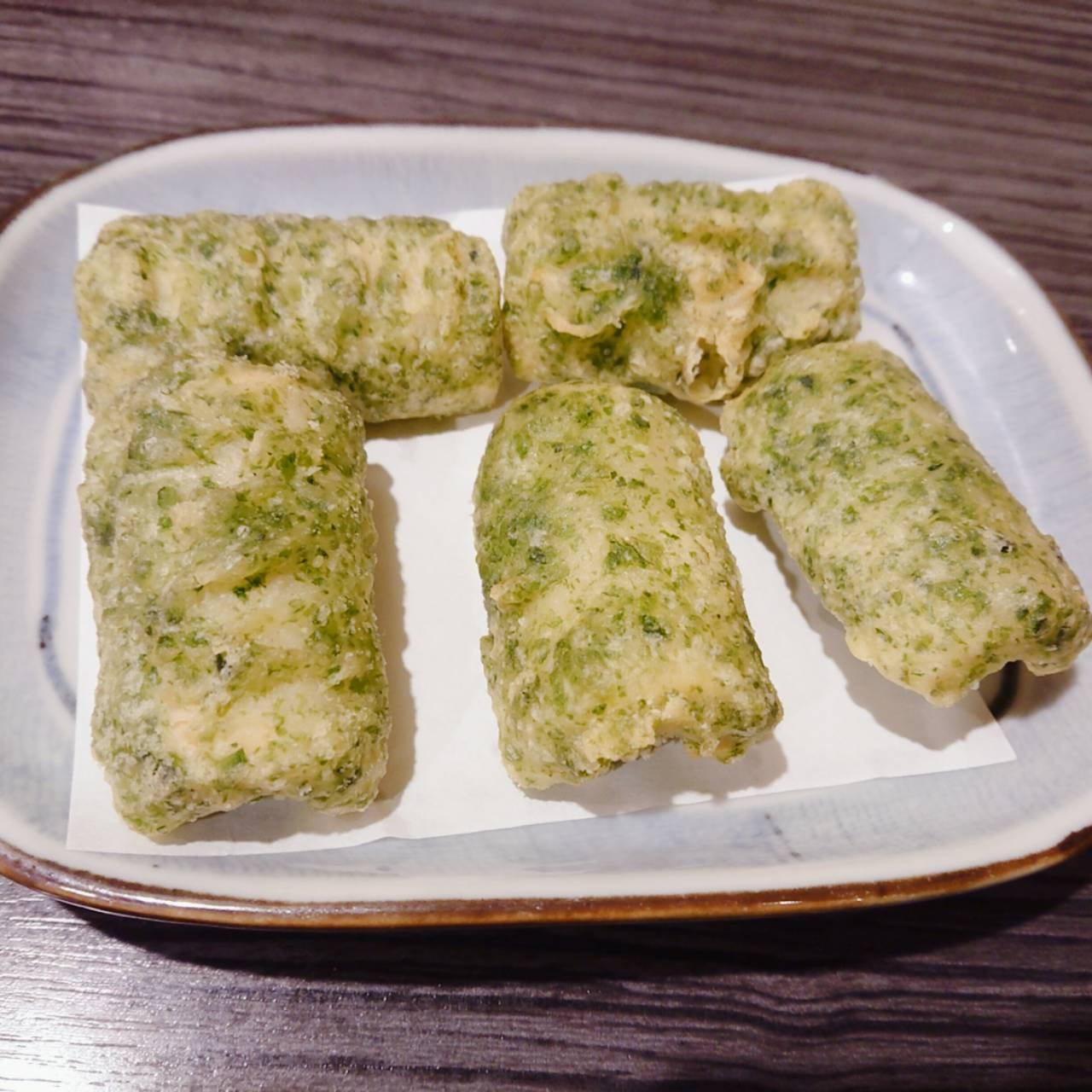
Fried with nori flakes

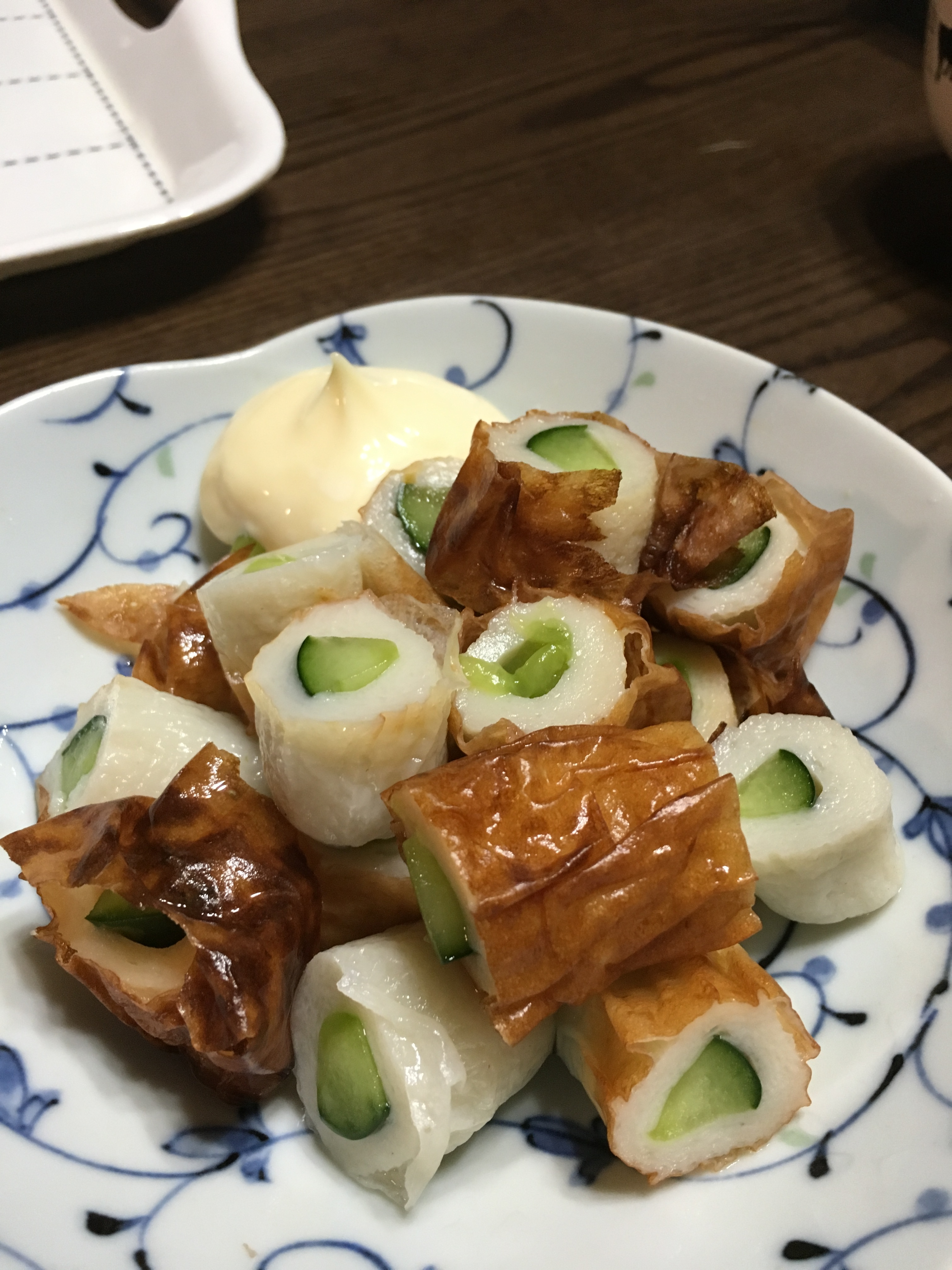
With cucumber

== See also ==
- Fish ball
