= Shizuoka oden =

Japanese food

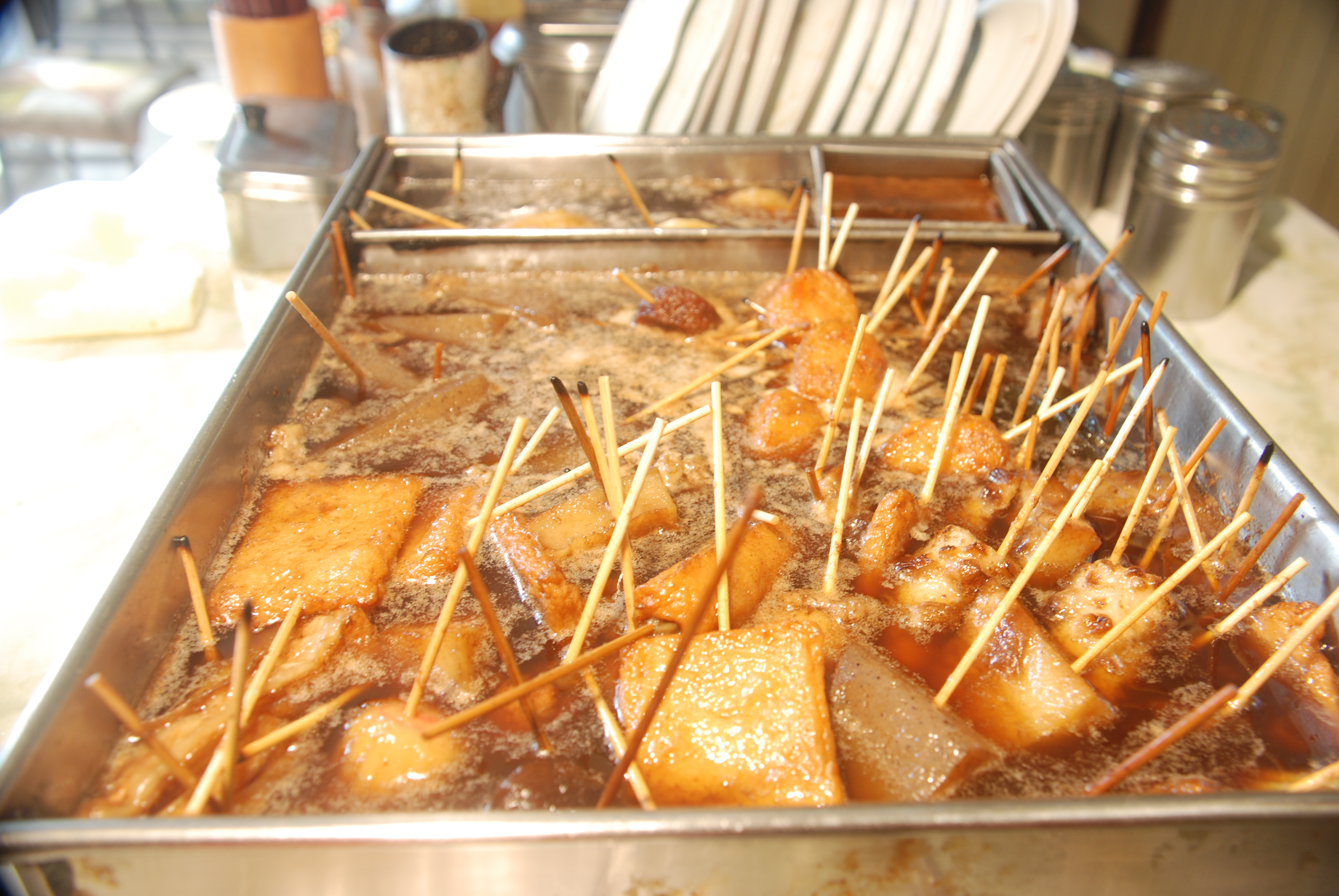
Shizuoka oden

Shizuoka oden is a variation of oden, a stew-like Japanese food consisting of fish paste cakes, boiled eggs, daikon, potatoes, kelp rolls, konnyaku, and other ingredients that are first boiled, then kept simmering in a broth until consumption.

== Overviews ==
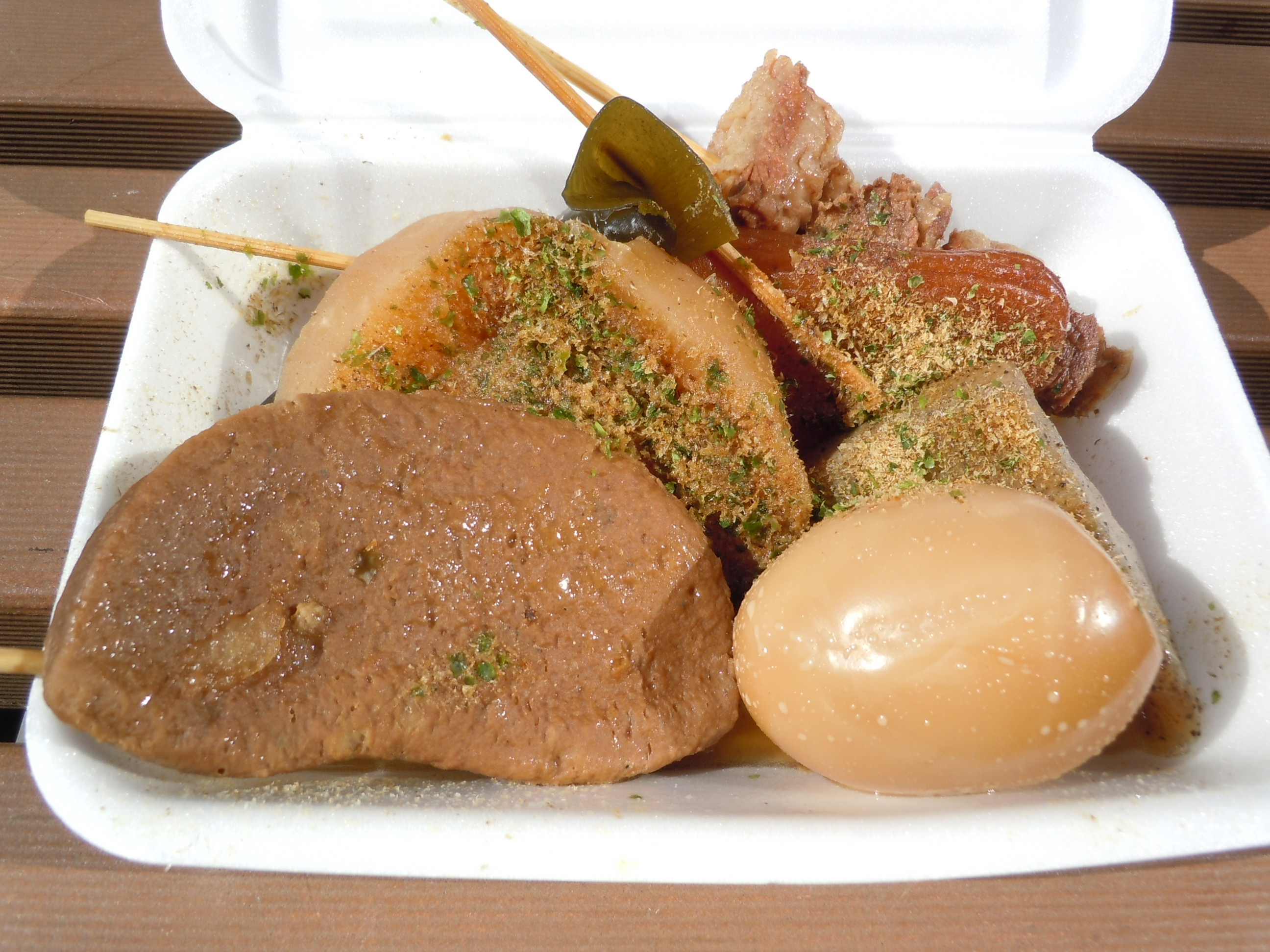
Shizuoka oden

Shizuoka oden differs from other types of oden in two ways: the preparation of the broth and the way every ingredient is skewered on a stick. The broth is made with beef sinew (instead of the dried skipjack flakes used in other types of oden) and seasoned with strong soy sauce. Because the simmering broth is only replenished rather than discarded, it takes on a very deep, brown-black color, but this process of adding new broth to old is what gives Shizuoka oden a distinctive flavor.

Like other types of oden, Shizuoka oden is particularly suitable for consumption in the colder seasons because of its warming effect, much like hot soups and stews served in other countries with cold seasons. Shizuoka oden is best eaten and paired with spicy karashi mustard.

== History ==
Originating in the 14th century during the Muromachi period, shizuoka oden initially began as a dish called dengaku, which consisted of grilled tofu skewered topped with miso sauce. It is believed that oden was created to make use of the leftover fish and vegetables. The name was eventually shortened to “den” with an honorific “o” at the beginning, creating the name “oden”. During the Edo period, tofu stew was mainly cooked with a robust soy sauce and a soup made from a blend of konbu (seaweed), whale meat, and beef tendons, but later on, whale meat was not used anymore. After the Meiji period, people started adding ingredients like konnyaku and eggs into the mix. Shizuoka oden is a popular dish at festivals and stalls throughout Japan. Oden was initially offered at street stalls, but nowadays it can be found in izakaya, restaurants, convenience stores, and canned products in vending machines.

== Broth ==
Although different regions of Japan say they all have unique ways of making shizuoka oden broth, variations could be divided into 3 main categories:

1. In the Kansai region or Western Japanese, the broth is more likely to be seen as light.
2. In the Nagoya area, oden is served with miso soup.
3. In the Kanto region or Eastern Japan, oden is cooked in a dark broth.

=== East versus West ===
Shizuoka oden is a traditional Japanese dish that is popular in both West and East Japan. The main difference between the two versions is the ingredients and broth used. In West Japan, the stew is seasoned with light soy sauce with mirin and salt, and left to lightly simmer in the pot. It is common to see people use more meat in oden in the West, like beef tendon and octopus. In eastern Japan, the broth is more sweet and savory with the dark soy sauce, sugar, and sake that is used. The broth is left to simmer for a longer time and the most popular ingredient included in their broth is fish cake.

The broth is best cooked slowly over low to medium-low heat because if it starts boiling, it might cause ingredients like the eggs to break, which will ruin the clarity of the soup. Simmering the broth for several hours will allow the flavors to develop and will create a richer and more flavorful broth. Additionally, adding ingredients like mushrooms and other vegetables can enhance the flavor of the broth.

== Ingredients ==
Top 10 favorite ingredients and their popularity:

1. Boiled egg: 28.3%
2. Radish (daikon): 27.2%
3. Beef tendon (gyusuji): 8.4%
4. Mochi purse (Kinchaku): 5.9%
5. Hanpen:5.5%
6. Atsuage: 4.6%
7. Chikuwabu: 4.2%
8. Konjac (Konnyaku): 3.6%
9. Ganmodoki: 3.4%
10. Others: 3.2%

Alternative ingredients:

1. Boiled egg (chicken or quail)
2. Firm tofu
3. Potato
4. Carrots
5. Tsukune (Japanese chicken meatball)
6. Tsumire (Japanese fishball)
7. Rolled cabbage (seasoned pork wrapped in cabbage)
8. Boiled octopus
9. Hot dog sausage

== Shizuoka Oden Food Alley ==
Aoba Koen Park Street used to be lined with food stands that served oden and drinks from the afternoon into the morning time. It is an excellent way to enjoy a unique Japanese dish while enjoying the park street atmosphere. Since the hygiene law in the 1960s were passed, these stands were forced to move indoor and eventually becoming the Aoba Oden Alley. This alley is a popular street food area that's known to serve traditional Japanese dish, consisting of various ingredients that are simmered in dashi broth. The Aoba Oden Alley is great place to visit for those looking for a unique and tasty snack. Each shop is able to seat about 6-9 customers at a time and many customers are regulars, meaning they eat at the shop often. In the oden alley, some serve oden and others serve a more homemade type of food. Usually when the owner retires, a younger person looking to start a small business or a former customer will take over the business.

=== Shizuoka Festival ===
Every year in mid-February, a Shizuoka Oden Festival is held in Aoba Koen and Gofuku-cho area where adults and children all come together for fun. The festival included traditional music and dance performances, food stalls, fireworks, and other activities. The festival is aimed at promoting the region's culture and tourism, and is attended by thousands of people from all around the country. People come to enjoy the food and entertainment at the festival, as well as to mingle with the locals and experience the culture of Shizuoka.

== See also ==
- List of Japanese soups and stews
- List of soups
