= Chikuwabu =

Japanese food

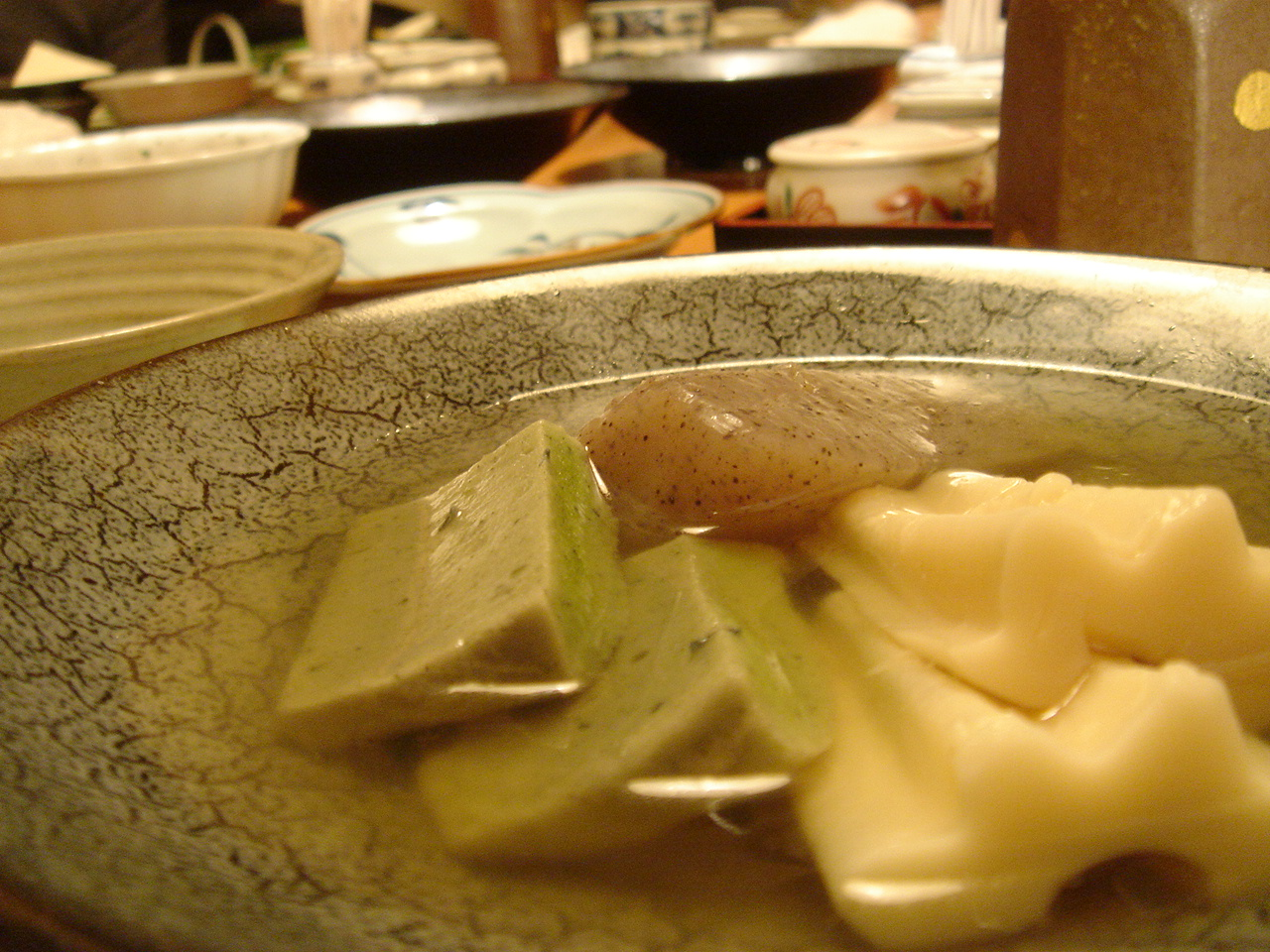
A bowl of oden containing chikuwabu

Chikuwabu (ちくわぶ) is a wheat-based Japanese food item that is frequently eaten as an ingredient in oden. Similar to the process used to make udon, dough is made by kneading flour with salt and water and then formed into a thick cylindrical shape with a hollow tube through its center and steamed. It is particularly popular as an ingredient in Tokyo, but it can generally be found across Japan in supermarkets and specialty stores.

Amongst non-Japanese, Chikuwabu is sometimes confused with the fish-based chikuwa, as they are similar in shape and name and are both common ingredients in oden. Unlike chikuwa, chikuwabu is rarely eaten on its own.

== See also ==
- Hanpen, another oden ingredient
- Konnyaku, another oden ingredient
