= Chikuzenni =

Japanese dish

Chikuzen-ni
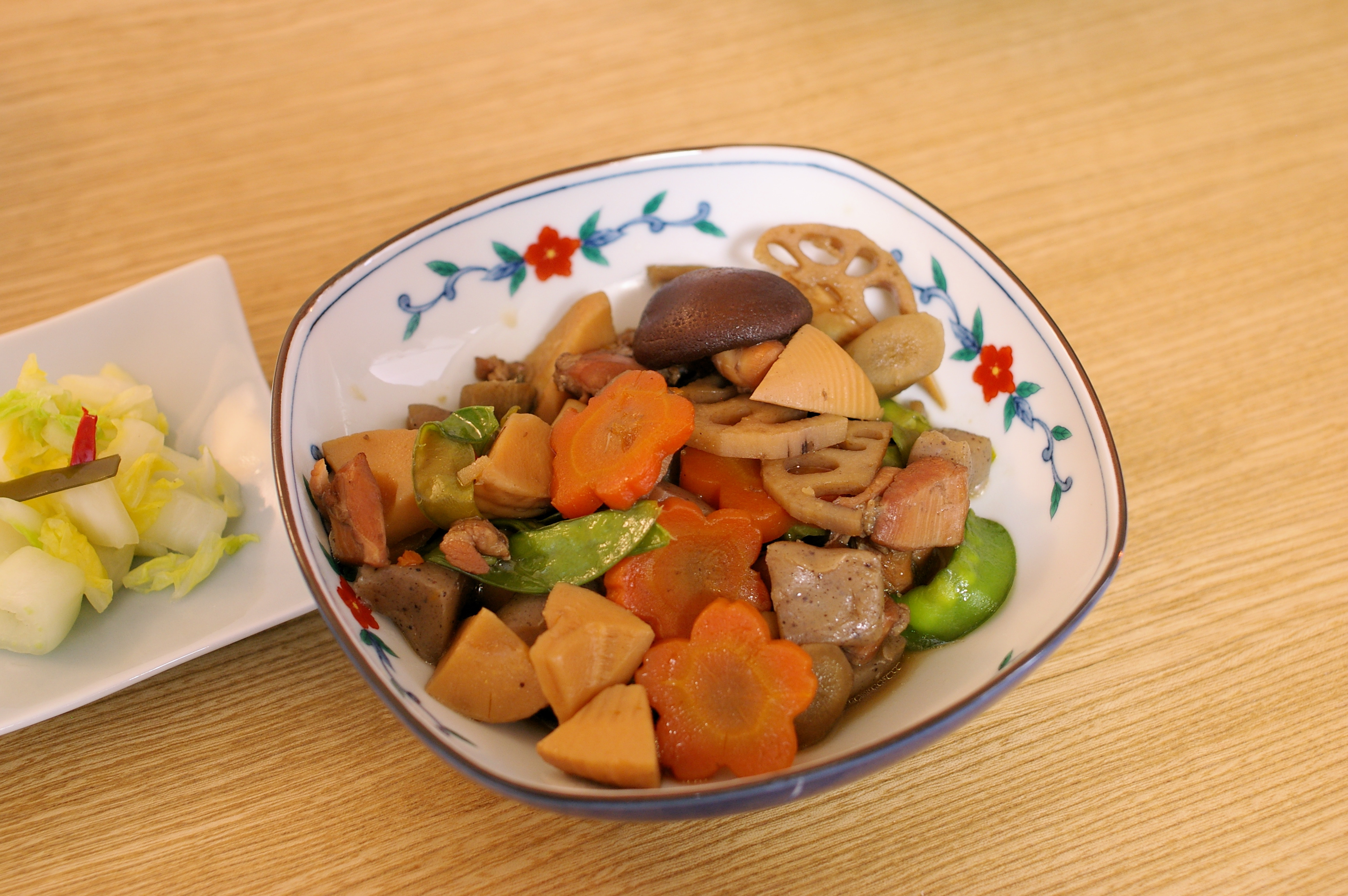
- Chikuzen-ni
- Alternative names: Game-ni
- Place of origin: Japan
- Region or state: Kyushu
- Main ingredients: dashi, shiitake, lotus root, burdock root, carrots, snap peas, chicken

Chikuzenni (筑前煮, chikuzen-ni) is a dish that originated from northern Kyushu, Japan, made of braised chicken and vegetables. It is often eaten when bringing in the new year in Japan.

== History and etymology ==
Chikuzen-ni was named after the historical Chikuzen Province (now Fukuoka Prefecture). The dish was originally called game-ni (がめ煮), perhaps a derivation from the Hakata dialectal verb "gamekurikomu", meaning "to collect" (because of how the ingredients were gathered and cooked together).

An alternative theory holds that Japanese soldiers stationed in Korea during the Japanese invasions of Korea used turtles called dobugame (どぶがめ) instead of chicken, and called the dish game-ni (がめ煮), where game is short for dobugame.

Today, chicken is used instead of turtle meat. According to the Ministry of Public Management, Home Affairs, Posts and Telecommunications of Japan, chicken and burdock root are consumed the most in Fukuoka, Japan; believed to be due to the high number of households that make chikuzen-ni.

== Preparation and serving ==
The ingredients are sautéd in oil and then cooked in broth. Sometimes, snap peas are added after the vegetables are completely cooked.
