= Oden =

Japanese hot pot dish

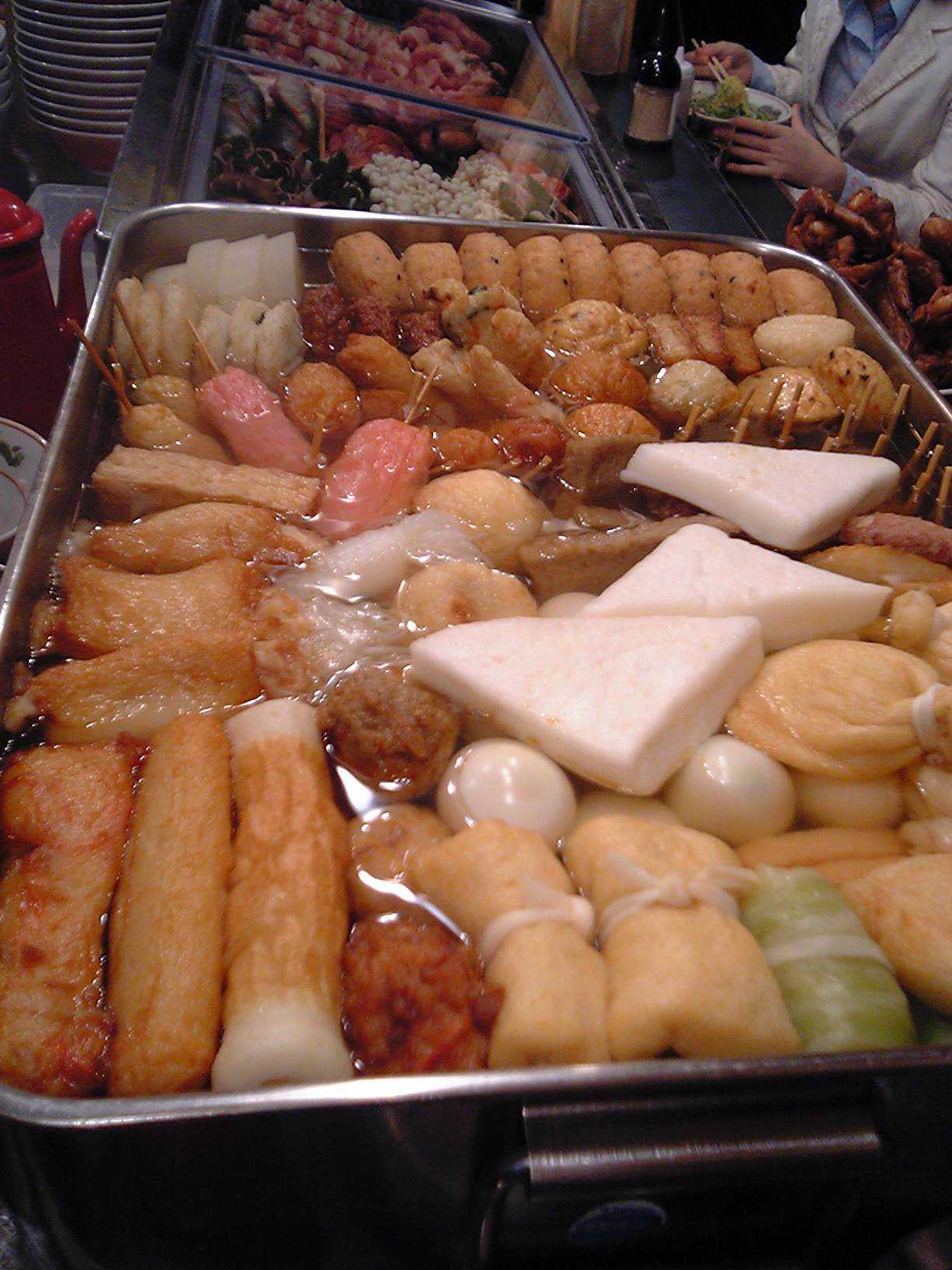
- Oden stewing at an oden stall
- Type: Soup
- Place of origin: Japan
- Main ingredients: Boiled eggs, daikon, konjac, fishcakes, soy-flavored dashi broth

Various oden stewing in broth

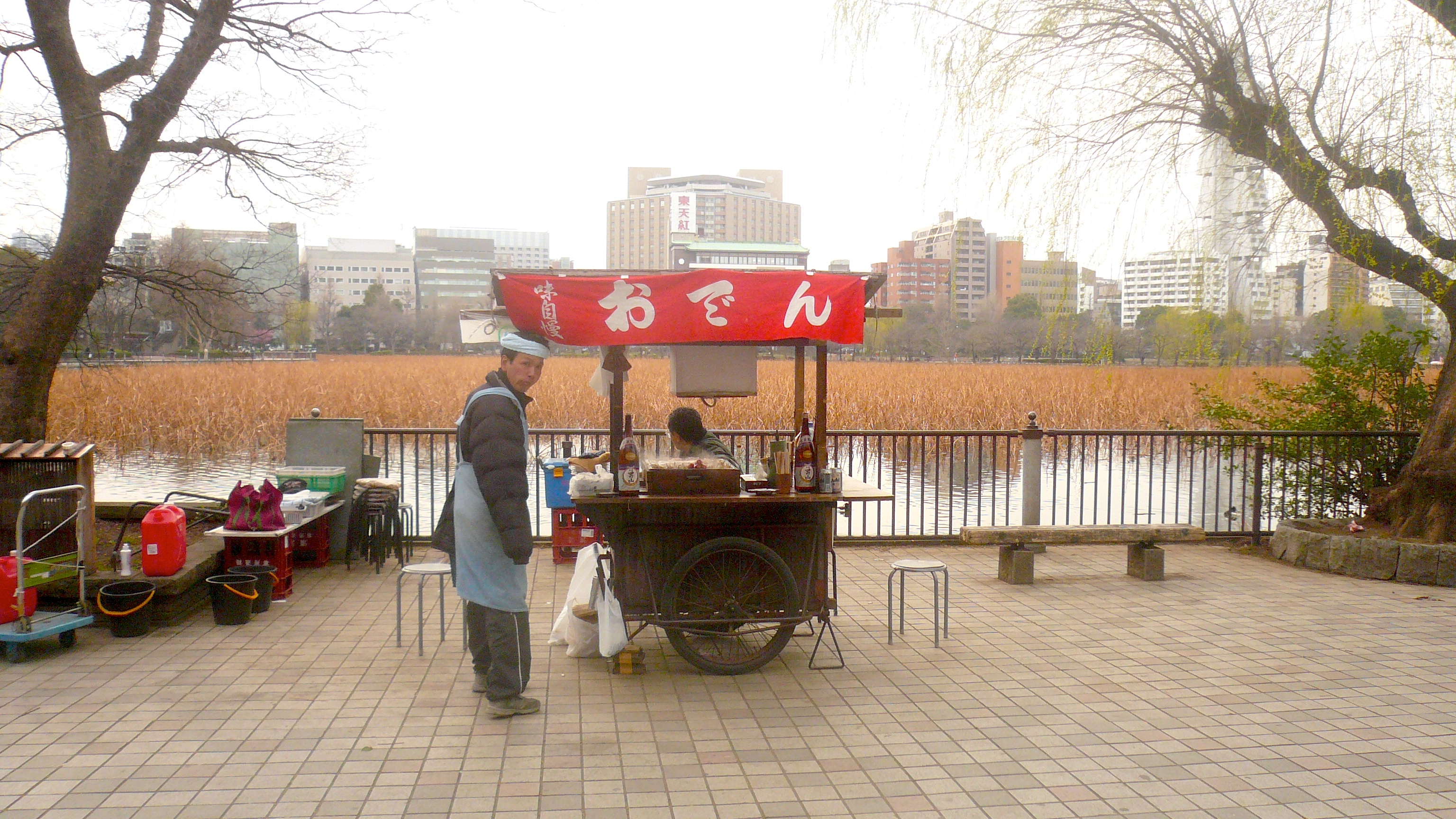
A man selling oden from a yatai food cart in Ueno Park, 2007

Oden (おでん or 御田) is a type of nabemono (Japanese one-pot dishes) consisting of several ingredients such as boiled eggs, daikon or konjac, and processed fish balls stewed in a light, soy-flavored dashi broth.

Oden was originally what is now commonly called miso dengaku or simply dengaku; konjac or tofu was boiled and eaten with miso. Later, instead of using miso, ingredients were cooked in dashi, and oden became popular. Ingredients vary according to region and between each household. Karashi is often used as a condiment.

Oden is often sold from food carts, though some izakayas and several convenience store chains also serve it, and dedicated oden restaurants exist. Many different varieties are sold, with single-ingredient dishes sometimes as cheap as 100 yen. While it is usually considered a winter food, some carts and restaurants offer oden year-round. Many of these restaurants keep their broth as a master stock, replenishing it as it simmers to let the flavor deepen and develop over many months and years.

Oden is represented in Unicode as an emoji at code point U+1F362: 🍢

== Regional variations ==
=== Japan ===
In Nagoya, oden retains its original meaning of a miso-based stew, and Tokyo-style dashi-based oden is referred to as Kantō-ni (関東煮; lit. 'Kantō stew')) instead. Soy sauce is used as a dipping sauce.

Miso oden is simmered in hatchō miso broth, which tastes lightly sweet. Konjac and tofu are common ingredients.

In the Kansai area, this dish is sometimes called Kanto-daki (関東炊き) and tends to be more strongly flavored than the lighter Kantō version.

Shizuoka oden uses a dark-colored broth flavored with beef stock and dark soy sauce, and all ingredients are skewered. Dried and ground fish (sardine, mackerel, or katsuobushi) and aonori powder are sprinkled on top before eating.

Udon restaurants in Kagawa Prefecture in Shikoku almost always offer oden as a side dish, to be eaten with sweet miso while waiting for udon.

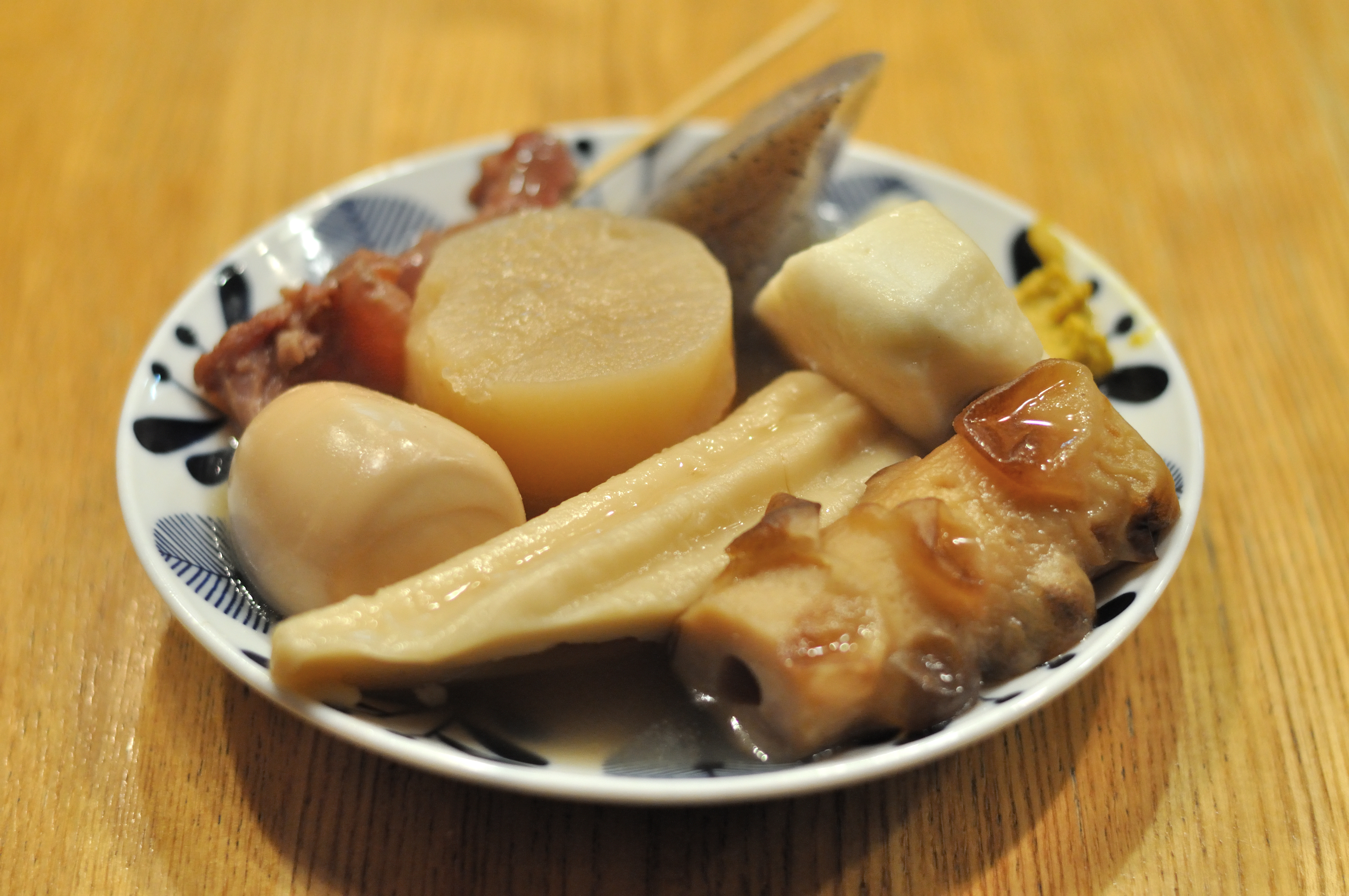
Typical oden ingredients

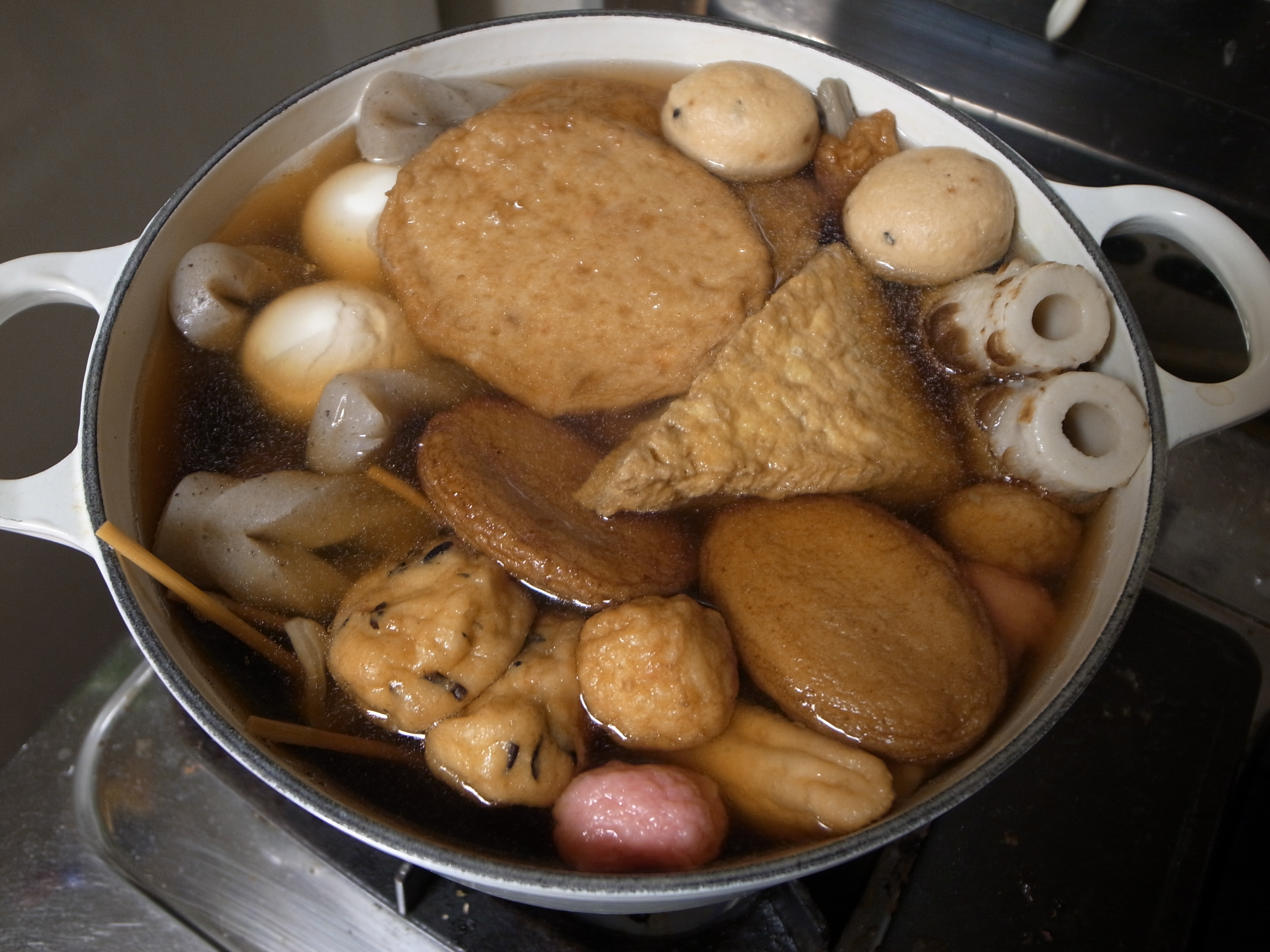

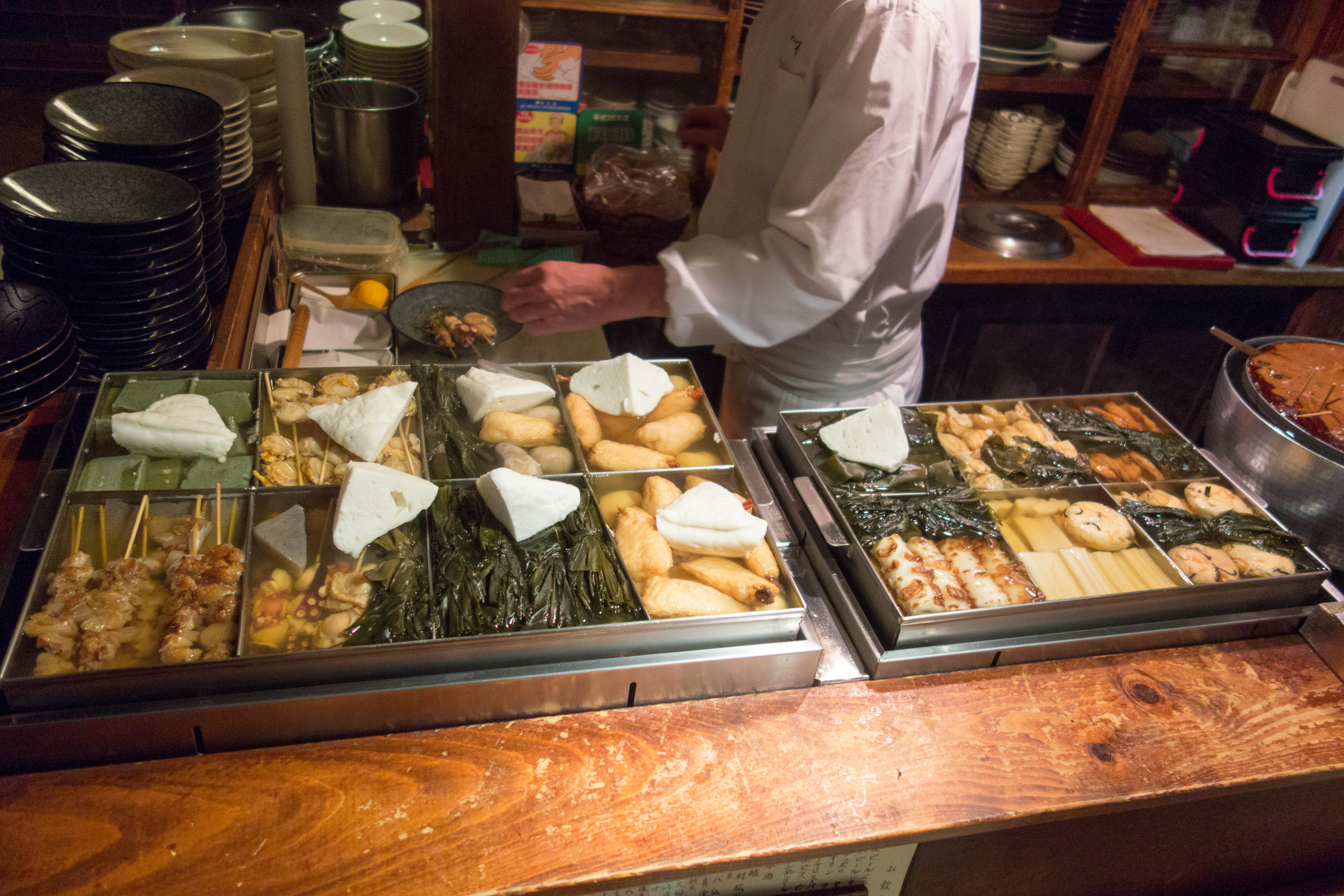

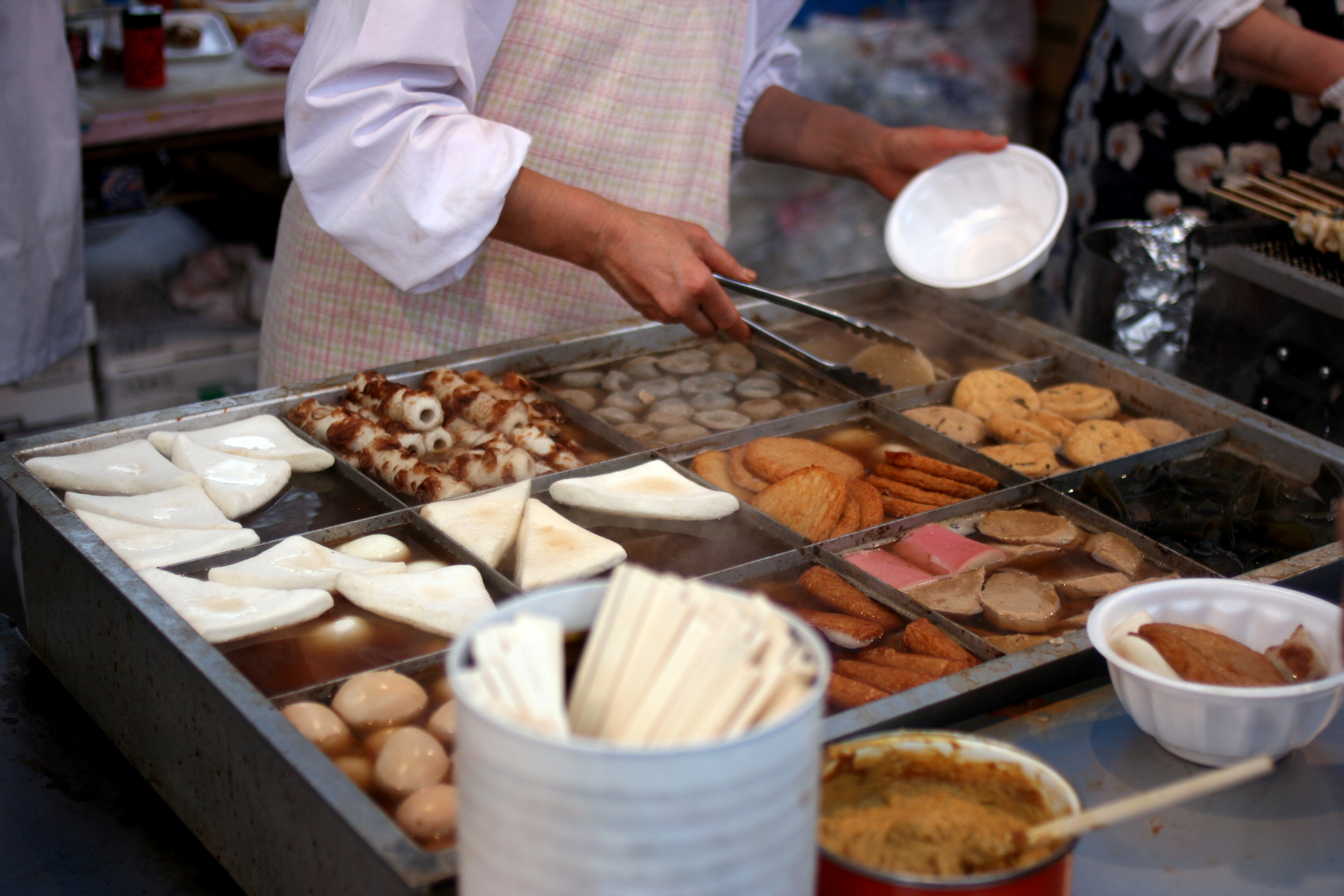

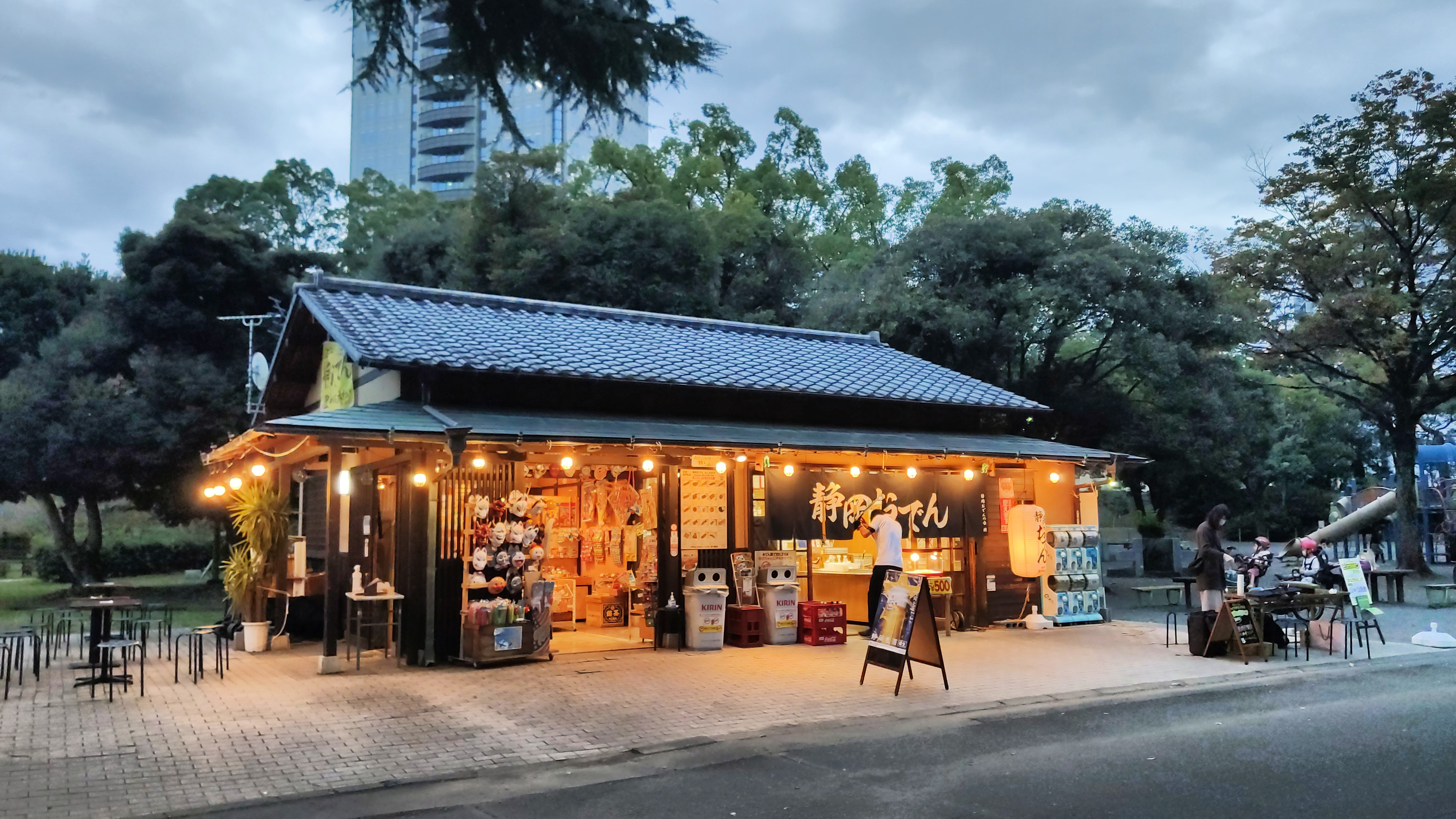
Oden store at Sunpu Castle Park in Shizuoka City

=== Outside Japan ===
==== China ====
In China, 7-Eleven markets oden as hǎodùn (好炖) a word play on 'good pot'.

==== South Korea ====
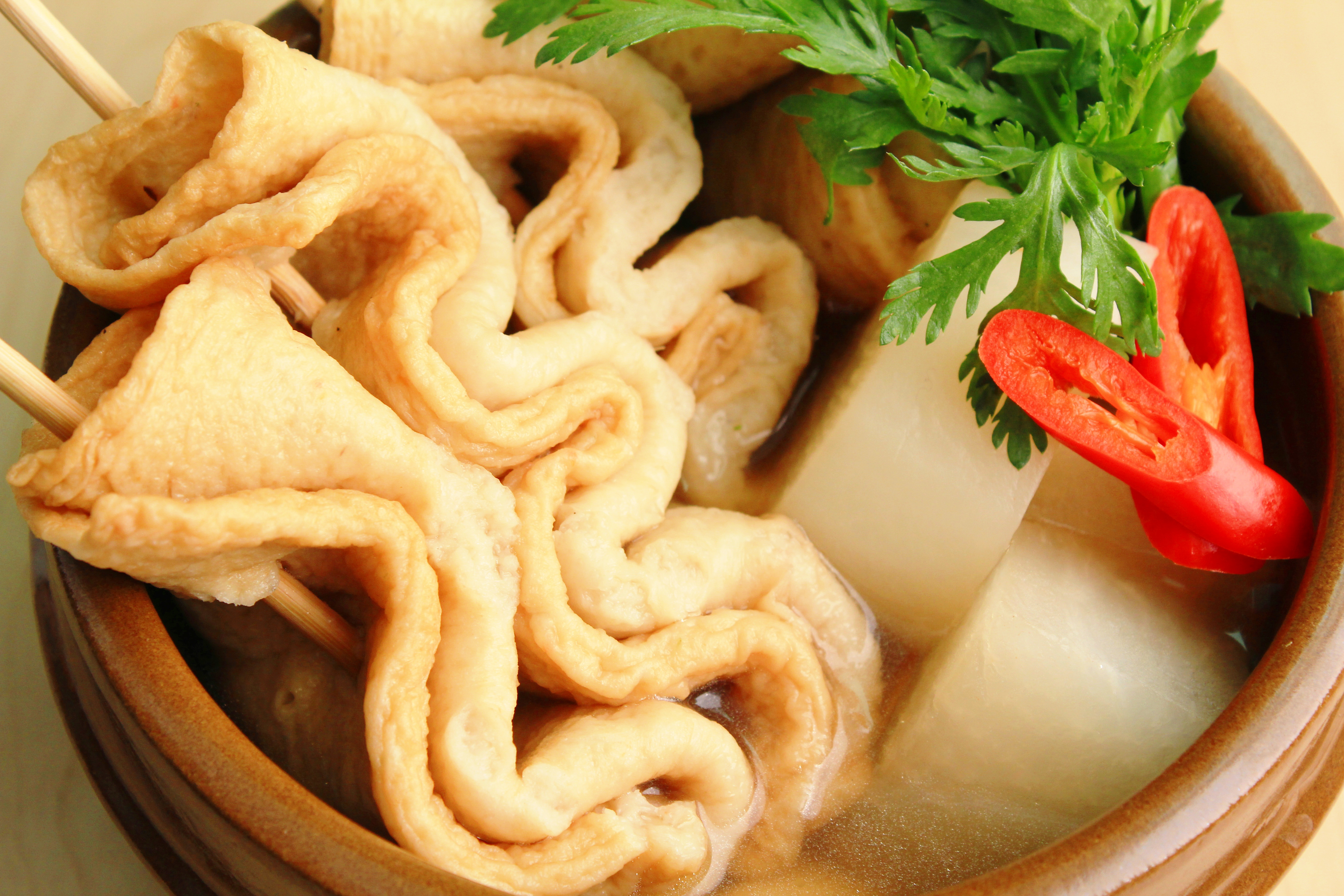
Eomuk-tang or odeng-tang (Korean fish cake soup)

In South Korea, the loanword odeng (오뎅) borrowed from Japanese oden is a synonym of eomuk (fishcakes). The boiled dish consisting of fishcakes is called by the names such as odeng-tang (오뎅탕) or eomuk-jeongol (어묵전골), with the words such as tang ('soup') or jeongol ('hot pot') attached to the ingredient name. The street food version is sold from small carts and is usually served with a spicy soup. It is very common on the streets of South Korea and there are many restaurants that have it on the menu or specialize in it.

==== Taiwan ====
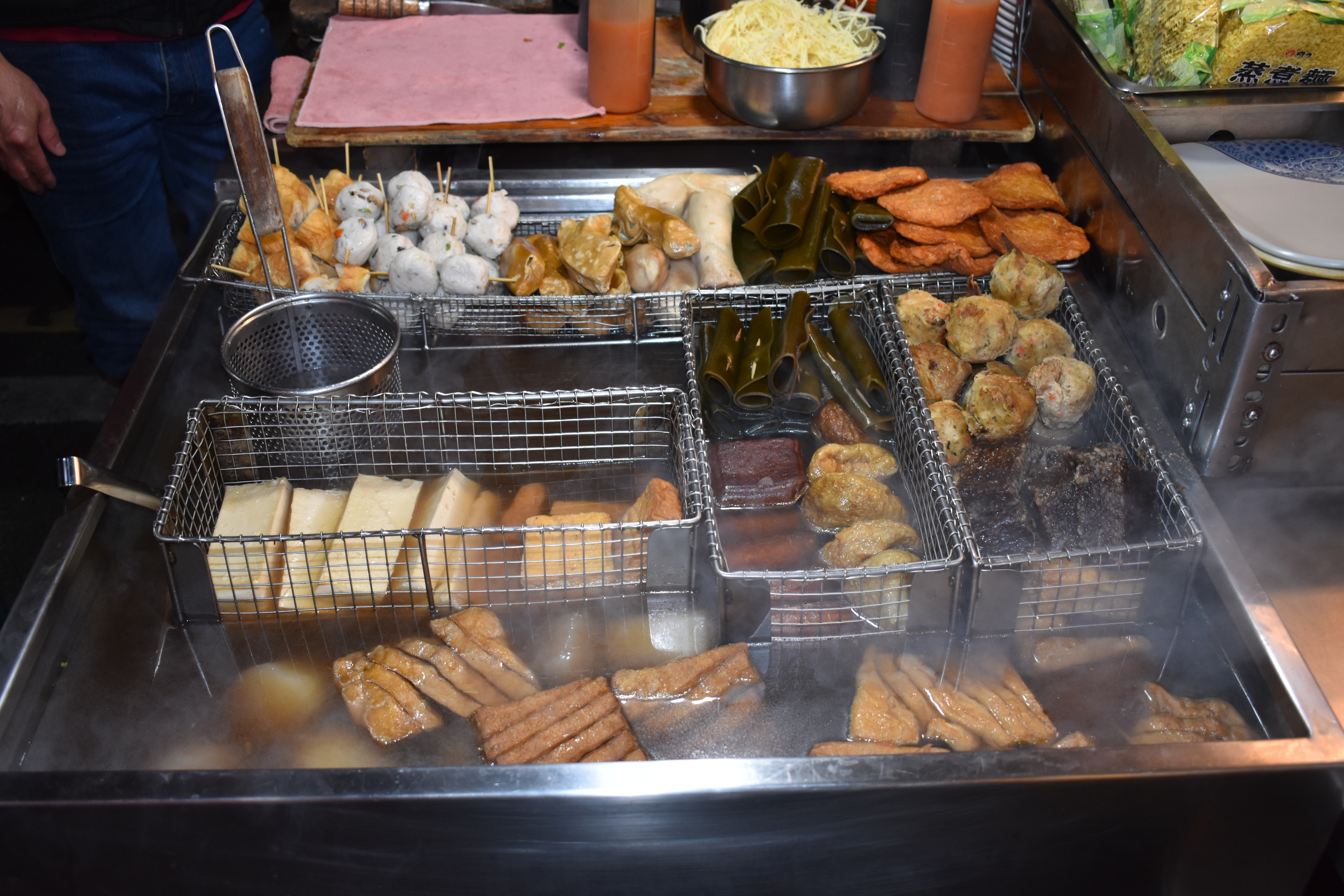
Taiwanese-style oden in a night market in Keelung

Oden was introduced to Taiwanese cuisine during Japanese rule and is referred to in Taiwanese Hokkien as olen (Chinese: 烏輪; Pe̍h-ōe-jī: o͘-lián), which has been further loaned into Taiwanese Mandarin as hēilún (Chinese: 黑輪). Tianbula (Chinese: 甜不辣; pinyin: tiánbùlà; lit. 'sweet, not spicy') is a common ingredient for oden and is a popular snack at night markets. Tianbula is actually Japanese satsuma-age and was introduced to Taiwan by people from Kyushu (where satsuma-age is commonly known as tempura) when Taiwan was under Japanese rule. Besides the more traditional ingredients, the Taiwanese olen also uses many local ingredients, such as pork meatballs and blood puddings. More recently, oden is offered in convenience stores where it is sold as guāndōngzhǔ (關東煮), the Mandarin reading of the Japanese characters for Kantō-ni.

== See also ==
- List of Japanese soups and stews
- List of soups
- Shabu-shabu
